= List of Helloween members =

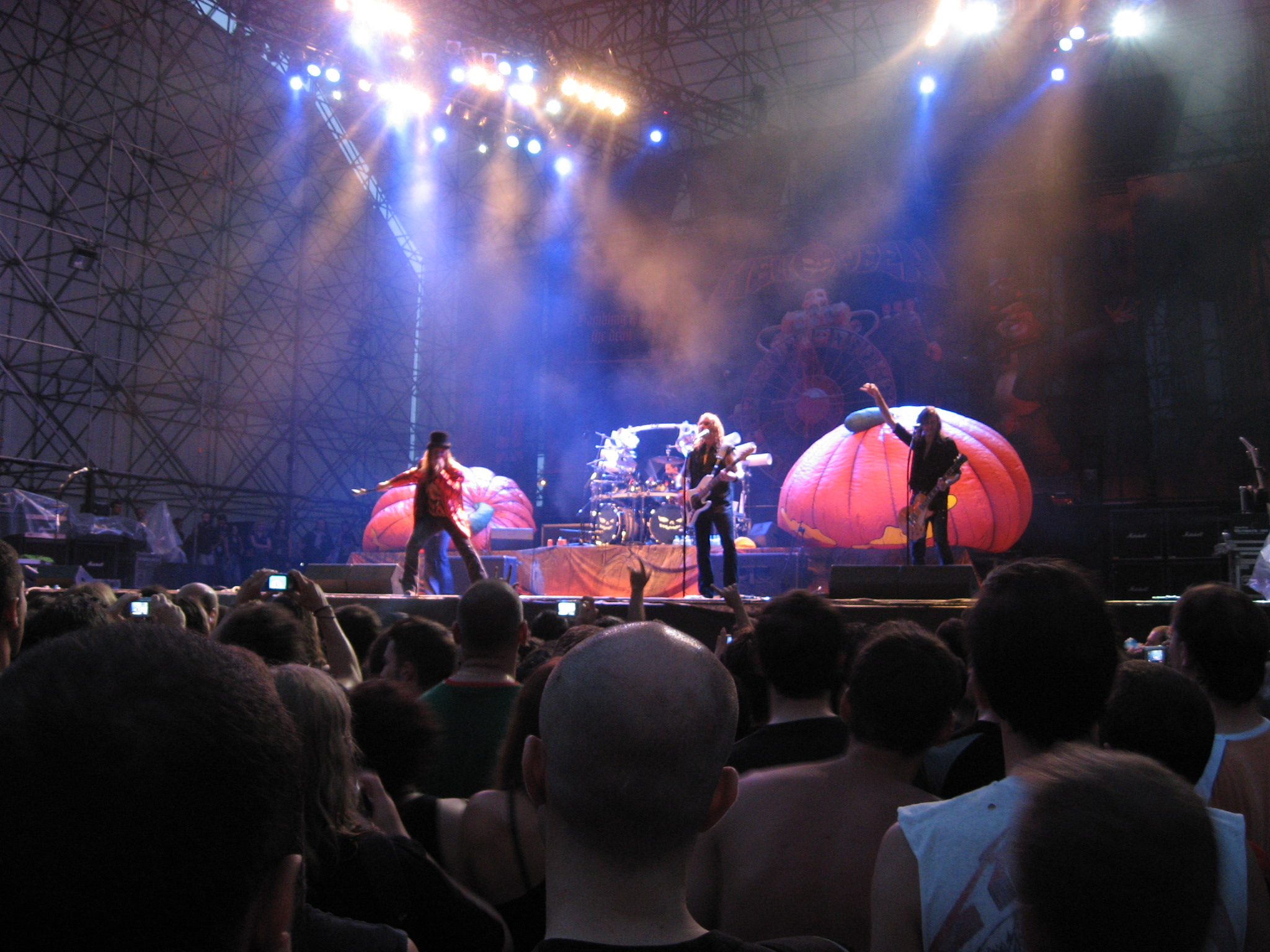
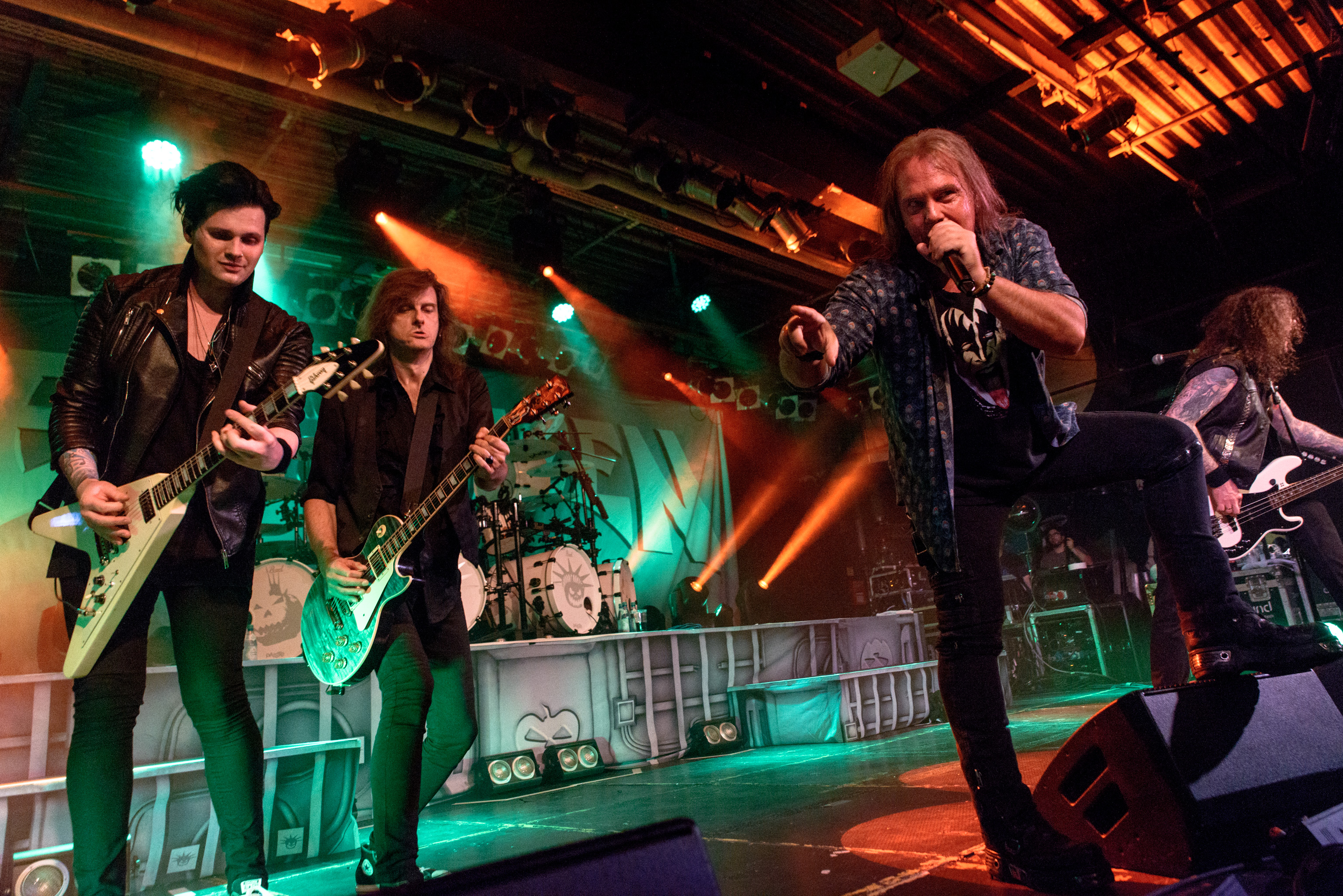
Helloween performing live in 2008 (top) and 2016 (bottom)

Helloween are a German power metal band from Hamburg. Formed in 1984, the group was originally a quartet featuring Kai Hansen on lead vocals and guitar, Michael Weikath on guitar and backing vocals, Markus Grosskopf on bass and backing vocals, and Ingo Schwichtenberg on drums. The band's current lineup includes constant members Weikath and Grosskopf, alongside Hansen (who rejoined in 2016 after leaving in 1989), co-lead vocalists Michael Kiske (from 1986 to 1993, and since 2016) and Andreas "Andi" Deris (since 1994), rhythm guitarist and backing vocalist Sascha Gerstner (since 2002), and drummer Daniel "Dani" Löble (since 2005).

== History ==
=== 1984–1994 ===
Helloween were formed in 1984 by Kai Hansen, Michael Weikath, Markus Grosskopf and Ingo Schwichtenberg. The band signed with German heavy metal label Noise Records before the end of the year and released their self-titled debut EP in April 1985. After the group issued their debut full-length album Walls of Jericho later the same year, Hansen decided to step back from the role of lead vocalist to focus on his guitar playing. After a lengthy process of trying to find a replacement, in November the role was filled by Michael Kiske. Keeper of the Seven Keys: Parts I and II followed in 1987 and 1988, respectively, before Hansen left completely on New Year's Day 1989 due to "the ever-increasing stress of touring". He was quickly replaced by Roland Grapow and the band returned to touring.

With new guitarist Roland Grapow, the band released two studio albums – Pink Bubbles Go Ape in 1991 and Chameleon in 1993 – before more lineup changes occurred. During the 1993 tour in promotion of Chameleon, Schwichtenberg was fired due to drug addiction and mental health issues, with Riad "Ritchie" Abdel-Nabi taking his place for the rest of the shows. By the end of the year, Kiske had also been fired after growing tensions between the two members had led Weikath to refuse to work with the vocalist. Schwichtenberg would later commit suicide in 1995. These changes resulted in several lineup changes within Helloween.

=== 1994–2003 ===
After firing two members in late 1993, Helloween returned early the following year with new vocalist Andreas "Andi" Deris and drummer Ulrich "Uli" Kusch. This lineup remained stable for several years, issuing a string of commercially successful albums. However, in August 2001 it was announced that both Kusch and guitarist Roland Grapow had parted ways with Helloween. In a statement issued the day after the official announcement, the dismissals were credited to "differences in priority", with a spokesman for the band adding that "It was felt Roland and Uli were paying too much time and attention to their solo projects. After a very successful tour behind The Dark Ride album Michael, Markus and Andi felt quite rightly that the focus of Helloween members must be 100% on Helloween."

In early September, Kusch's replacement was announced as former Metalium drummer Mark Cross. Helloween remained without a second guitarist until August 2002, when it was announced that Sascha Gerstner, who had left Freedom Call a year earlier, had joined the band. Recording subsequently began for the group's next album, however Cross was forced to sit out after contracting mononucleosis, with Mikkey Dee of Motörhead taking his place in the studio. In February 2003, Cross was officially replaced by former U.D.O. and Accept drummer Stefan Schwarzmann.

=== Since 2003 ===
Within two years of joining, drummer Stefan Schwarzmann had left Helloween, with Daniel "Dani" Löble taking his place in February 2005. The lineup remained stable for more than ten years, before it was announced in November 2016 that founding member Kai Hansen and former vocalist Michael Kiske would be returning to Helloween for the Pumpkins United World Tour starting the following year. At the start of the tour, the newly expanded group released the single "Pumpkins United", featuring Kiske, Hansen and continuing vocalist Andi Deris on vocals. Following the touring cycle, the seven-piece incarnation of Helloween remained in place, for the 2021 studio album Helloween.

== Official members ==
=== Current ===
Image	Name	Years active	Instruments	Release contributions
	Michael Weikath	1984–present	guitars; backing vocals	all Helloween releases
	Markus Grosskopf	1984–present	bass; backing vocals	all Helloween releases
	Kai Hansen	1984–1989; 2016–present	guitars; lead and backing vocals	all Helloween releases from Helloween (1985) to Live in the U.K. (1989); United Alive in Madrid (2019); Helloween (2021); Giants & Monsters (2025)
	Michael Kiske	1986–1993; 2016–present	lead and backing vocals	all Helloween releases from Keeper of the Seven Keys: Part I (1987) to Chameleon (1993); United Alive in Madrid (2019); Helloween (2021); Giants & Monsters (2025)
	Andreas "Andi" Deris	1994–present	lead and backing vocals	all Helloween releases from Master of the Rings (1994) onwards
	Sascha Gerstner	2002–present	guitars; occasional keyboards; backing vocals	all Helloween releases from Rabbit Don't Come Easy (2003) onwards
	Daniel "Dani" Löble	2005–present	drums	all Helloween releases from Keeper of the Seven Keys: The Legacy (2005) onwards

=== Former ===
Image	Name	Years active	Instruments	Release contributions
	Ingo Schwichtenberg	1984–1993 (died 1995)	drums	all Helloween releases from Helloween (1985) to Chameleon (1993)
	Roland Grapow	1989–2001	guitars; backing vocals	all Helloween releases from Pink Bubbles Go Ape (1991) to The Dark Ride (2000)
	Ulrich "Uli" Kusch	1994–2001	drums; backing vocals	all Helloween releases from Master of the Rings (1994) to The Dark Ride (2001)
	Mark Cross	2001–2003	drums	Rabbit Don't Come Easy (2003) – two tracks each only
	Stefan Schwarzmann	2003–2005	drums	Rabbit Don't Come Easy (2003) – two tracks each only

== Backup musicians ==
=== Session ===
Image	Name	Years active	Instruments	Release contributions
	James Hardaway	1985	synthesisers	Walls of Jericho (1985)
	Peter Iversen	1990	keyboards	Pink Bubbles Go Ape (1991)
	Phil Nicholas	1990	keyboards	Pink Bubbles Go Ape (1991)
	Corinna Wolke	1992	backing vocals	Chameleon (1993) – one track only
	Lenny Wolf	1992	backing vocals	Chameleon (1993) – one track only
	Jutta Weinhold	1997	backing vocals	Better Than Raw (1998)
	Ralf Maurer	1997	backing vocals	Better Than Raw (1998)
	Christina Hahne	1997	backing vocals	Better Than Raw (1998)
	Billy King	2000; 2004–2015	backing vocals	The Dark Ride (2000); all Helloween releases from Keeper of the Seven Keys: The Legacy (2005) to My God-Given Right (2015)
	Rolf Köhler	2000 (died 2007)	backing vocals	The Dark Ride (2000)
	Mikkey Dee	2002–2003	drums	Rabbit Don't Come Easy (2003)
	Olaf Senkbeil	2004–2015	backing vocals	all Helloween releases from Keeper of the Seven Keys: The Legacy (2005) to My God-Given Right (2015)
	Oliver Hartmann	2004–2005	backing vocals	Keeper of the Seven Keys: The Legacy (2005)
	Friedel Amon	2004–2005	keyboards	Keeper of the Seven Keys: The Legacy (2005)
	Matthias Ulmer	2007–present	keyboards	all Helloween releases from Gambling with the Devil (2007) to Giants & Monsters (2025)

=== Touring ===
Image	Name	Years active	Instruments	Release contributions
	Jørn Ellerbrock	1988–2003	keyboards; programming	Live in the U.K. (1989); all Helloween releases from Master of the Rings (1994) to The Dark Ride (2000)
	Ritchie Abdel-Nabi	1993	drums	none – live performances only

== Lineups ==
Period	Members	Releases
1984 – November 1986	Kai Hansen – lead vocals, guitar; Michael Weikath – guitar, backing vocals; Markus Grosskopf – bass, backing vocals; Ingo Schwichtenberg – drums	Helloween (1985); Walls of Jericho (1985); "Judas" (1986)
November 1986 – January 1989	Kai Hansen – guitar, backing vocals; Michael Weikath – guitar, backing vocals; Markus Grosskopf – bass, backing vocals; Ingo Schwichtenberg – drums; Michael Kiske – lead vocals	Keeper of the Seven Keys: Part I (1987); Keeper of the Seven Keys: Part II (1988); Live in the U.K. (1989)
January 1989 – late 1993	Michael Weikath – guitar, backing vocals; Markus Grosskopf – bass, backing vocals; Ingo Schwichtenberg – drums; Michael Kiske – lead vocals; Roland Grapow – guitar, backing vocals; Ritchie Abdel-Nabi – drums (touring in fall – late 1993)	Pink Bubbles Go Ape (1991); Chameleon (1993)
Early 1994 – August 2001	Michael Weikath – guitar, backing vocals; Markus Grosskopf – bass, backing vocals; Roland Grapow – guitar, backing vocals; Andi Deris – lead vocals; Uli Kusch – drums, backing vocals	Master of the Rings (1994); The Time of the Oath (1996); High Live (1996); Better Than Raw (1998); Metal Jukebox (1999); The Dark Ride (2000)
September 2001 – August 2002	Michael Weikath – guitar, backing vocals; Markus Grosskopf – bass, backing vocals; Andi Deris – lead vocals; Mark Cross – drums	none – writing and rehearsals only
August 2002 – February 2003	Michael Weikath – guitar, backing vocals; Markus Grosskopf – bass, backing vocals; Andi Deris – lead vocals; Mark Cross – drums; Sascha Gerstner – guitar, backing vocals	Rabbit Don't Come Easy (2003) (Cross appears on two tracks only)
February 2003 – February 2005	Michael Weikath – guitar, backing vocals; Markus Grosskopf – bass, backing vocals; Andi Deris – lead vocals; Sascha Gerstner – guitar, backing vocals; Stefan Schwarzmann – drums	Rabbit Don't Come Easy (2003) (two special edition bonus tracks only)
February 2005 – November 2016	Michael Weikath – guitar, backing vocals; Markus Grosskopf – bass, backing vocals; Andi Deris – lead vocals; Sascha Gerstner – guitar, backing vocals; Dani Löble – drums	Keeper of the Seven Keys: The Legacy (2005); Live in Sao Paulo (2007); Gambling with the Devil (2007); Unarmed: Best of 25th Anniversary (2009); 7 Sinners (2010); Burning Sun (2012); Straight Out of Hell (2013); My God-Given Right (2015)
November 2016 – present	Michael Weikath – guitar, backing vocals; Markus Grosskopf – bass, backing vocals; Andi Deris – lead vocals; Sascha Gerstner – guitar, backing vocals; Dani Löble – drums; Kai Hansen – guitar, backing and lead vocals; Michael Kiske – lead vocals	"Pumpkins United" (2017); United Alive in Madrid (2019); Helloween (2021); Giants & Monsters (2025)
