= Helloween discography =

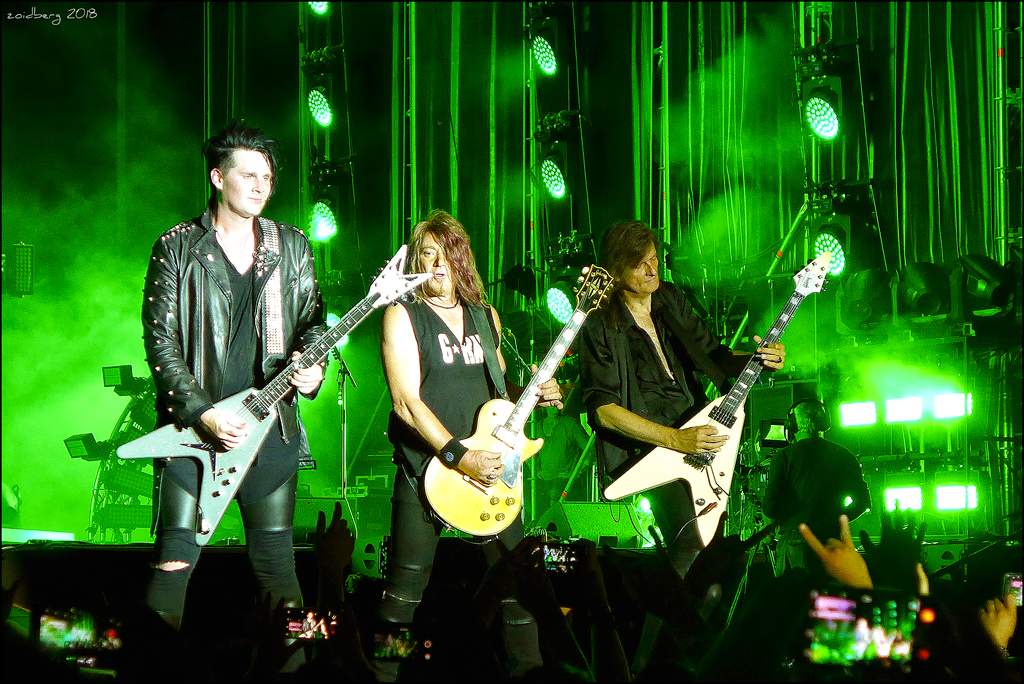
- Studio albums: 16
- Live albums: 5
- Compilation albums: 8
- Singles: 36
- Video albums: 7
- Music videos: 46

The following is a discography of Helloween, an influential German heavy metal band, credited as the "fathers" of the power metal subgenre.

== Albums ==
=== Studio albums ===
Year	Album details	Peak chart positions											Sales
Year	Album details	GER	AUT	FIN	FRA	JPN	NOR	SPA	SWE	SWI	UK	US	Sales
1985	Helloween (EP): Released: April 1985; Label: Noise; Format: cassette, LP	—	—	—	—	—	—	—	—	—	—	—	
1985	Walls of Jericho: Released: November 1985; Label: Noise; Format: CD, cassette, LP	—	—	—	—	—	—	—	—	—	—	—	
1987	Keeper of the Seven Keys: Part I: Released: May 1987; Label: Noise; Format: CD, cassette, LP	15	—	—	—	—	—	—	42	18	—	104	GER: Gold
1988	Keeper of the Seven Keys: Part II: Released: August 1988; Label: Noise; Format: CD, cassette, LP	5	9	—	—	27	12	—	7	6	24	108	GER: Gold
1991	Pink Bubbles Go Ape: Released: March 1991; Label: EMI; Format: CD, cassette, LP	32	28	—	—	31	14	—	14	20	41	—	
1993	Chameleon: Released: May 1993; Label: EMI; Format: CD, cassette, LP	35	—	—	—	8	—	—	35	30	—	—	
1994	Master of the Rings: Released: August 1994; Label: Castle; Format: CD, cassette, LP	23	34	—	—	6	—	—	26	22	—	—	JPN: Gold
1996	The Time of the Oath: Released: March 1996; Label: Castle; Format: CD, cassette, LP	31	33	14	—	6	—	—	26	30	—	—	JPN: Gold
1998	Better Than Raw: Released: March 1998; Label: Castle; Format: CD, cassette, LP	19	36	7	—	9	—	—	35	42	—	—	JPN: Gold
2000	The Dark Ride: Released: October 2000; Label: Nuclear Blast; Format: CD	26	—	19	—	11	—	—	38	68	—	—	
2003	Rabbit Don't Come Easy: Released: May 2003; Label: Nuclear Blast; Format: CD	26	—	23	119	11	—	—	12	93	—	—	
2005	Keeper of the Seven Keys: The Legacy: Released: October 2005; Label: SPV/Steamhammer; Format: CD, LP	28	—	28	89	22	—	—	24	61	—	—	
2007	Gambling with the Devil: Released: October 2007; Label: SPV/Steamhammer; Format: CD	38	—	34	103	17	44	59	34	88	—	—	
2010	7 Sinners: Released: 31 October 2010; Label: Sony Music; Format: CD	25	57	16	65	18	—	51	40	38	—	—	
2013	Straight Out of Hell: Released: 18 January 2013; Label: Sony Music; Format: CD	4	22	4	50	11	21	46	6	12	—	97	
2015	My God-Given Right: Released: 29 May 2015; Label: Nuclear Blast; Format: CD	8	30	5	44	9	37	21	22	14	—	—	
2021	Helloween: Released: 18 June 2021; Label: Nuclear Blast; Format: CD, LP, cassette	1	3	2	15	6	36	1	3	2	24	35	
2025	Giants & Monsters: Released: 29 August 2025; Label: Reigning Phoenix Music; Format: CD, LP, cassette	3	5	7	—	15	51	—	6	3	16	—	
"—" denotes an album did not chart in that country.

=== Live albums ===
Year	Title	Peak chart positions				Label
Year	Title	GER	US	UK	JPN	Label
1989	Live in the U.K.	14	123	26	23	Noise Records
1996	High Live	89	—	—	45	Castle Communications
2007	Keeper of the Seven Keys – The Legacy World Tour 2005/2006	58	—	—	156	Steamhammer
2019	United Alive in Madrid	4	—	—	29	Nuclear Blast
2024	Live at Budokan	14	—	—	—	Reigning Phoenix Music

=== Compilation albums ===
Year	Title	Peak chart positions		Label
Year	Title	GER	JPN	Label
1989	Pumpkin Tracks	—	—	Noise Records
1991	The Best, the Rest, the Rare	—	15	Noise Records
1998	Karaoke Remix Vol.1	—	1	Victor Entertainment
1998	Karaoke Remix Vol.2	—	24	Victor Entertainment
1998	Pumpkin Box	—	—	Victor Entertainment
1999	Metal Jukebox	—	—	Castle Music
2002	Treasure Chest	—	62	Sanctuary Records
2006	The Singles Box 1985–1992	—	—	Castle Music
2009	Unarmed – Best of 25th Anniversary	—	8	Sony Music
2016	Ride the Sky – The Very Best of the Noise Years 1985–1998	—	—	Noise Records
2017	Sweet Seductions – Best Of	—	—	Victor Entertainment
2025	March of Time – The Best of 40 Years	10	38	Noise Records

== Singles ==
Year	Title	Peak chart positions	
Year	Title	UK	JPN
1986	"Judas"	—	—
1987	"Future World"	—	—
1988	"Dr. Stein"	57	81
1988	"I Want Out"	69	—
1991	"Kids of the Century"	56	—
1992	"Number One"	—	—
1993	"Windmill"	—	—
1993	"When the Sinner"	—	—
1993	"Step Out of Hell"	—	—
1993	"I Don't Wanna Cry No More"	—	—
1994	"Mr. Ego"	—	67
1994	"Perfect Gentleman"	—	—
1994	"Where the Rain Grows"	—	—
1995	"Sole Survivor"	—	—
1996	"Power"	—	40
1996	"The Time of the Oath"	—	—
1996	"Forever and One"	—	—
1998	"I Can"	—	54
1998	"Hey Lord!"	—	—
1999	"Lay All Your Love on Me"	—	—
2000	"If I Could Fly"	—	82
2000	"Mr. Torture"	—	—
2003	"Just a Little Sign"	—	133
2005	"Mrs. God"	—	50
2005	"Run (In the Name of Your Enemy)"	—	—
2006	"Light the Universe"	—	—
2007	"As Long as I Fall"	—	154
2010	"Are You Metal?"	—	284
2010	"Dr. Stein"	—	—
2012	"Burning Sun"	—	—
2013	"Nabataea"	—	—
2015	"Battle's Won"	—	—
2015	"Lost in America"	—	—
2017	"Pumpkins United"	—	—
2021	"Skyfall"	—	—
2021	"Fear of the Fallen"	—	—
2025	"This Is Tokyo"	—	—
2025	"Universe (Gravity for Hearts)"	—	—

== Videography ==
Year	Title
1994	The Pumpkin Video
1996	High Live
2004	Hellish Videos
2007	Live on 3 Continents
2017	Sweet Seductions - Best Of
2019	United Alive
2024	Live at Budokan

== Music videos ==
- 1.- "Halloween" (1987) From the album "Keeper of the Seven Keys, Part I"
- 2.- "I Want Out" (1988) From the album "Keeper of the Seven Keys, Part II"
- 3.- "Kids Of The Century" (1991) From the album "Pink Bubbles Go Ape"
- 4.- "When The Sinner" (1993) From the album "Chameleon"
- 5.- "Mr. Ego (Take Me Down)" (1994) From the album "Master of the Rings"
- 6.- "Perfect Gentleman" (1994) From the album "Master of the Rings"
- 7.- "Where The Rain Grows" (1994) From the album "Master of the Rings"
- 8.- "Power" (1996) From the album "The Time of the Oath"
- 9.- "The Time Of The Oath" (1996) From the album "The Time of the Oath"
- 10.- "Forever And One (Neverland)" (1996) From the album "The Time of the Oath"
- 11.- "I Can" (1998) From the album "Better Than Raw"
- 12.- "Hey Lord!" (1998) From the album "Better Than Raw"
- 13.- "If I Could Fly" (2000) From the album "The Dark Ride"
- 14.- "Just A Little Sign" (2003) From the album "Rabbit Don't Come Easy"
- 15.- "Mrs. God" (2005) From the album "Keeper of the Seven Keys - The Legacy"
- 16.- "Light The Universe" (2006) From the album "Keeper of the Seven Keys - The Legacy"
- 17.- "As Long As I Fall" (2007) From the album "Gambling with the Devil"
- 18.- "Paint A New World" (2008) From the album "Gambling with the Devil"
- 19.- "Dr. Stein" (2009) From the album "Unarmed"
- 20.- "Are You Metal?" (2010) From the album "7 Sinners"
- 21.- "Nabataea" (2012) From the album "Straight Out of Hell"
- 22.- "Waiting For The Thunder" (Official Live Video - Studio Audio) (2013) From the album "Straight Out of Hell"
- 23.- "Straight Out Of Hell" (Official Live Video - Studio Audio) (2014) From the album "Straight Out of Hell"
- 24.- "Battle's Won" (Lyric Video) (2015) From the album "My God-Given Right"
- 25.- "My God-Given Right" (2015) From the album "My God-Given Right"
- 26.- "Lost in America" (Official Live Video - Studio Audio) (2015) From the album "My God-Given Right"
- 27.- "Heroes" (Official Live Video) (2016) From the album "My God-Given Right"
- 28.- "Before The War" (Official Live Video) (2016) From the album "The Time Of The Oath"
- 29.- "Pumpkins United" (Lyric Video) (2017) From the album "Helloween"
- 30.- "Halloween" (2019) From the album DVD "United Alive"
- 31.- "Dr. Stein" (2019) From the album DVD "United Alive"
- 32.- "Perfect Gentleman" (2019) From the album DVD "United Alive"
- 33.- "Forever And One (Neverland)" (2019) From the album DVD "United Alive"
- 34.- "How Many Tears" (2019) From the album DVD "United Alive"
- 35.- "Invitation / Eagle Fly Free" (2019) From the album DVD "United Alive"
- 36.- "Future World" (2019) From the album DVD "United Alive"
- 37.- "I Want Out" (2019) From the album DVD "United Alive"
- 38.- "Pumpkins United" (2019) From the album DVD "United Alive"
- 39.- "Skyfall" (2021) From the album "Helloween"
- 40.- "Fear of the Fallen" (Lyric Video) (2021) From the album "Helloween"
- 41.- "Best Time" (Lyric Video) (2021) From the album "Helloween"
- 42.- "Angels" (Lyric Video) (2021) From the album "Helloween"
- 43.- "Rise Without Chains" (Lyric Video) (2021) From the album "Helloween"
- 44.- "Mass Pollution" (Lyric Video) (2021) From the album "Helloween"
- 45.- "Indestructible" (Lyric Video) (2021) From the album "Helloween"
- 46.- "Robot King" (Lyric Video) (2021) From the album "Helloween"
- 47.- "Cyanide" (Lyric Video) (2021) From the album "Helloween"
- 48.- "Skyfall" (Lyric Video) (2021) From the album "Helloween"
- 49.- "Out For The Glory" (2021) From the album "Helloween"
- 50.- "Down In The Dumps" (Lyric Video) (2022) From the album "Helloween"
- 51.- "Best Time" (Official Videoclip) (2022) From the album "Helloween"
- 52.- "Best Time" (2024) From the album "Live At Budokan"
- 53.- "Eagle Fly Free" (2024) From the album "Live At Budokan"
- 54.- "Save Us" (2024) From the album "Live At Budokan"
- 55.- "Forever And One" (2024) From the album "Live At Budokan"
- 56.- "Future World" (2025) From the album "Live At Budokan"
- 57.- "This Is Tokyo" (2025) From the album "Giants & Monsters"
- 58.- "Universe (Gravity for Hearts)" (2025) From the album "Giants & Monsters"
- 59.- "A Little Is A Little Too Much" (2025) From the album "Giants & Monsters"
- 60.- "Twilight Of The Gods" (Official Live Video) (2026) From the album "Keeper Of The Seven Keys Part I"
