= Keeper of the Seven Keys =

Keeper of the Seven Keys may refer to the following albums by German band Helloween:

- Keeper of the Seven Keys: Part I, the band's second full-length album, released in 1987.
- Keeper of the Seven Keys: Part II, the follow up album, released in 1988.
- Keeper of the Seven Keys: The Legacy, the band's eleventh album, released in 2005.
- Keeper of the Seven Keys – The Legacy World Tour 2005/2006, the band's third live album, released in 2007.
