= Unarmed – Best of 25th Anniversary =

Unarmed - Best of 25th Anniversary

Compilation album by Helloween
- Released: 23 December 2009 (Japan, Southeast Asia); 29 January 2010
- Recorded: 2009
- Genres: Symphonic metal, acoustic rock, jazz
- Length: 62:38
- Labels: Victor Entertainment, Sony Music
- Producer: Charlie Bauerfeind

Helloween chronology
Gambling with the Devil (2007)	Unarmed - Best of 25th Anniversary (2009)	7 Sinners (2010)

Singles from Unarmed – Best of 25th Anniversary
- 1. "Dr. Stein (Unarmed Version)" Released: 29 January 2010

Professional ratings
Review scores
Source	Rating
AllMusic	2/5 stars
Consequence of Sound	4/5 stars
Metal Storm	8/10 stars
Sputnikmusic	2/5 stars

Unarmed – Best of 25th Anniversary is the sixth compilation album by German power metal band Helloween. It is a compilation in celebration of the band's 25th anniversary, which contains re-recorded versions of Helloween songs in an acoustic/symphonic style. It includes a 70-piece Prague Symphony Orchestra performing "The Keeper's Trilogy", a 17-minute medley consisting of the songs "Halloween", "Keeper of the Seven Keys" and "The King for a 1000 Years". Many guest musicians are featured on the tracks.

Commenting on the album on 2011, the bass guitarist Markus Grosskopf said:

It's just like we've been asked what to do [regarding their 25th anniversary], if we're going to do fine remakes or re-masters, but then sell the old stuff people get at home anyway just a slightly different sound, it wouldn't make any sense to us so we just wanted to give people something new. [...] It was interesting and fun to play a bass like this that you can hear on that record because I never did this.

The vocalist Andi Deris, however, panned the album in a 2015 interview, saying he never liked the idea of doing it and that the record company "raped" the band to do it. He commented:

You know, if I would like to have an acoustic album, I would have bought an acoustic guitar in the first place. What did I buy? An electric guitar. So what is this for me? Rape. I didn't like it at all. It was nice to sing this shit and actually show myself that I'm capable of doing that, not hiding behind the metal music but being the main instrument with the voice and front of everybody else. But that's it, that's it. I don't like the idea of being a metal band and then put out acoustic versions of your music. I would have done that in the first place if that would have been my intention of the music my heart beats for, but it's not.

== Track listing ==
No.	Title	Length
1.	"Dr. Stein" (from Keeper of the Seven Keys: Part II, 1988)	3:59
2.	"Future World" (from Keeper of the Seven Keys: Part I, 1987)	4:13
3.	"If I Could Fly" (from The Dark Ride, 2000)	3:28
4.	"Where the Rain Grows" (from Master of the Rings, 1994)	5:09
5.	"The Keeper's Trilogy"	17:06
6.	"Eagle Fly Free" (from Keeper of the Seven Keys: Part II, 1988)	3:50
7.	"Perfect Gentleman" (from Master of the Rings, 1994)	4:18
8.	"Forever And One (Neverland)" (from The Time of the Oath, 1996)	4:25
9.	"I Want Out" (from Keeper of the Seven Keys: Part II, 1988)	4:22
10.	"Fallen to Pieces" (from Gambling with the Devil, 2007)	3:28
11.	"A Tale that Wasn't Right" (from Keeper of the Seven Keys: Part I, 1987)	4:46
12.	"Why?" (from Master of the Rings, 1994)	3:34
Total length:		62:38

== Credits ==
- Andi Deris – vocals
- Michael Weikath – guitar (tracks 1–5, 7–11)
- Sascha Gerstner – guitar
- Markus Grosskopf – bass guitar (tracks 1–5, 7–11)
- Dani Löble – drums (tracks 1–5, 7–11)
- Prague Symphony Orchestra (tracks 5, 11)
- Gero Drnek (Fury in the Slaughterhouse) – accordion
- Andreas Becker (Peter Maffay) – guitar (tracks 2, 4, 7, 9)
- Albie Donnelly (Supercharge) – saxophone (track 1)
- Matthias Ulmer – piano (tracks 1, 3, 5, 10, 11)
- Nippy Noya – percussion (tracks 1–4, 6, 7, 9, 10)
- Harriet Ohlsson (Hellsongs) – duet vocals, arrangement (track 6)
- Kalle Karlsson (Hellsongs) – guitar, arrangement (track 6)
- Johan Bringhed (Hellsongs) – piano, arrangement (track 6)
- Richard Naxton, Johnny Clucas, Dan Hoadley, Chris Tickner, Richard Collier, Gerry O'Beime, Gunther Laudahn, Lawrence White, Jan-Eric Kohrs, Rob Fardell (Gregorian) – choir
- Charlie Bauerfeind – producer (tracks 1–5, 7–11)
- Petter Ericsson – producer (track 6)

== Charts ==
Chart (2009-10)	Peak position
German Albums (Offizielle Top 100)	39
Greek Albums (IFPI)	4
Italian Albums (FIMI)	87
