= Million-Dollar Haircuts on Ten-Cent Heads =

Studio album by Andi Deris and the Bad Bankers
- Released: 22 November 2013
- Genre: Hard rock, heavy metal
- Label: earMUSIC

Andi Deris solo discography chronology
| Done by Mirrors (1999) | Million-Dollar Haircuts on Ten-Cent Heads (2013) |

Million-Dollar Haircuts on Ten-Cent Heads is the third solo studio album by German singer Andi Deris of Helloween fame. It was recorded at Mi Sueño Studios, Tenerife, with the help of three local musicians, all of them members of a band called "The White Omelette".

It was released on 13 November 2013 on Japan, on 22 November in Europe, and on 21 January in the rest of the world.

In the album, Andi criticizes the financial crisis and the globalism:

Obviously we despise everything around banks, managers and bankers who are clearly responsible for the shit that goes on nowadays (and most certainly in our future), so it felt very good to vocally tell them what we think about them. Sure, therefore it's highly explicit but hey ... who gives a fuck. That's what they deserve ...

According to Deris, the title of the album means that there are many people whose heads are worth 10 cents but they actually afford million-dollar haircuts.

== Track listing ==
| No. | Title | Length |
|---|---|---|
| 1. | "Cock" | 2:54 |
| 2. | "Will We Ever Change" | 4:17 |
| 3. | "Banker's Delight (Dead or Alive)" | 3:45 |
| 4. | "Blind" | 4:48 |
| 5. | "Don't Listen to the Radio" | 3:07 |
| 6. | "Who Am I" | 6:20 |
| 7. | "Must Be Dreaming" | 3:36 |
| 8. | "The Last Days of Rain" | 3:27 |
| 9. | "EnAmoria" | 3:44 |
| 10. | "This Could Go on Forever" | 4:11 |
| 11. | "I Sing Myself Away" | 2:30 |
| 12. | "The Time of My Life (Bonus Track for Japan)" |

Bonus tracks (demos)
| No. | Title | Length |
|---|---|---|
| 12. | "Behind Dead Eyes" | 2:30 |
| 13. | "Little Lies" | 4:35 |
| 14. | "TWOTW 1938 (Don't Listen to the Radio)" | 3:05 |
| 15. | "Must Be Dreaming" | 3:50 |
| 16. | "EnAmoria" | 3:22 |

== Personnel ==
- Andi Deris - vocals, guitars
- Nico Martin - guitars
- Jezoar Marrero - bass
- Nasim López-Palacios - drums

== Notes ==
- "Must Be Dreaming" was originally written and recorded for Brazilian band Scelerata for its album "The Sniper".
- "Enamoria" was written for cancer help foundation project Lady's Voice.
