= High Live =

Live album by Helloween
- Released: 6 September 1996
- Recorded: Milan, Italy, 21 May 1996; Pamplona, Spain, 31 May 1996; Girona, Spain, 1 June 1996
- Genre: Power metal
- Length: 89:14
- Label: Raw Power (worldwide); Victor (Japan)
- Producer: Tommy Hansen

Helloween chronology
The Time of the Oath (1996)	High Live (1996)	Better Than Raw (1998)

Professional ratings
Review scores
Source	Rating
Allmusic	4/5 stars
Allmusic	(DVD)

High Live is the second live album by German power metal band Helloween, released in video and audio formats in 1996. The video was re-released on DVD in 2002 by Sanctuary Records.

== Track listing ==
=== Disc one ===
No.	Title	Writer(s)	Length
1.	"We Burn"	Andi Deris	4:12
2.	"Wake Up the Mountain"	Uli Kusch, Deris	5:22
3.	"Sole Survivor"	Michael Weikath, Deris	5:23
4.	"The Chance"	Roland Grapow	3:56
5.	"Why?"	Deris	4:43
6.	"Eagle Fly Free"	Weikath	5:17
7.	"The Time of the Oath"	Grapow, Deris	8:00
8.	"Future World"	Kai Hansen	5:45
9.	"Dr. Stein"	Weikath	5:01

=== Disc two ===
No.	Title	Writer(s)	Length
1.	"Before the War"	Deris	6:10
2.	"Mr. Ego (Take Me Down)"	Grapow	6:14
3.	"Power"	Weikath	6:54
4.	"Where the Rain Grows"	Weikath, Deris	7:30
5.	"In the Middle of a Heartbeat"	Deris, Weikath	3:09
6.	"Perfect Gentleman"	Deris	3:40
7.	"Steel Tormentor"	Weikath, Deris	7:58

== Credits ==
- Andi Deris - Vocals
- Michael Weikath - Guitars
- Roland Grapow - Guitars
- Markus Grosskopf - Bass
- Uli Kusch - Drums

== Charts ==
Chart (1996)	Peak position
Finnish Albums (Suomen virallinen lista)	23
German Albums (Offizielle Top 100)	89
Japanese Albums (Oricon)	45
