= Helloween (album) =

Studio album by Helloween
- Released: 18 June 2021
- Recorded: 2019–2020
- Studio: Mi Sueño Studio, Tenerife, Spain
- Genre: Power metal
- Length: 64:57
- Label: Nuclear Blast
- Producer: Charlie Bauerfeind, Dennis Ward

Helloween chronology
United Alive in Madrid (2019)	Helloween (2021)	Live at Budokan (2024)

Singles from Helloween
- 1. "Pumpkins United" Released: October 13, 2017; 2. "Skyfall" Released: April 2, 2021; 3. "Fear of the Fallen" Released: May 21, 2021

Helloween is the sixteenth studio album by German power metal band Helloween, released on 18 June 2021. The album is the first released with the "Pumpkins United" line-up, which marked the return of original member Kai Hansen on guitars and vocals and Michael Kiske on vocals in 2016, in addition to the five-member line-up active since 2005.

Helloween is the first album to feature Hansen since 1988's Keeper of the Seven Keys: Part II and the first one with Kiske since 1993's Chameleon. Released six years after its predecessor My God-Given Right (the longest gap between two albums from the band), the album is also the first to feature more than one singer, as Hansen, Kiske and Andi Deris, all of whom had performed as sole lead vocalist on previous albums, share lead vocal duties. The album reached top ten positions in several international music charts.

== Background ==
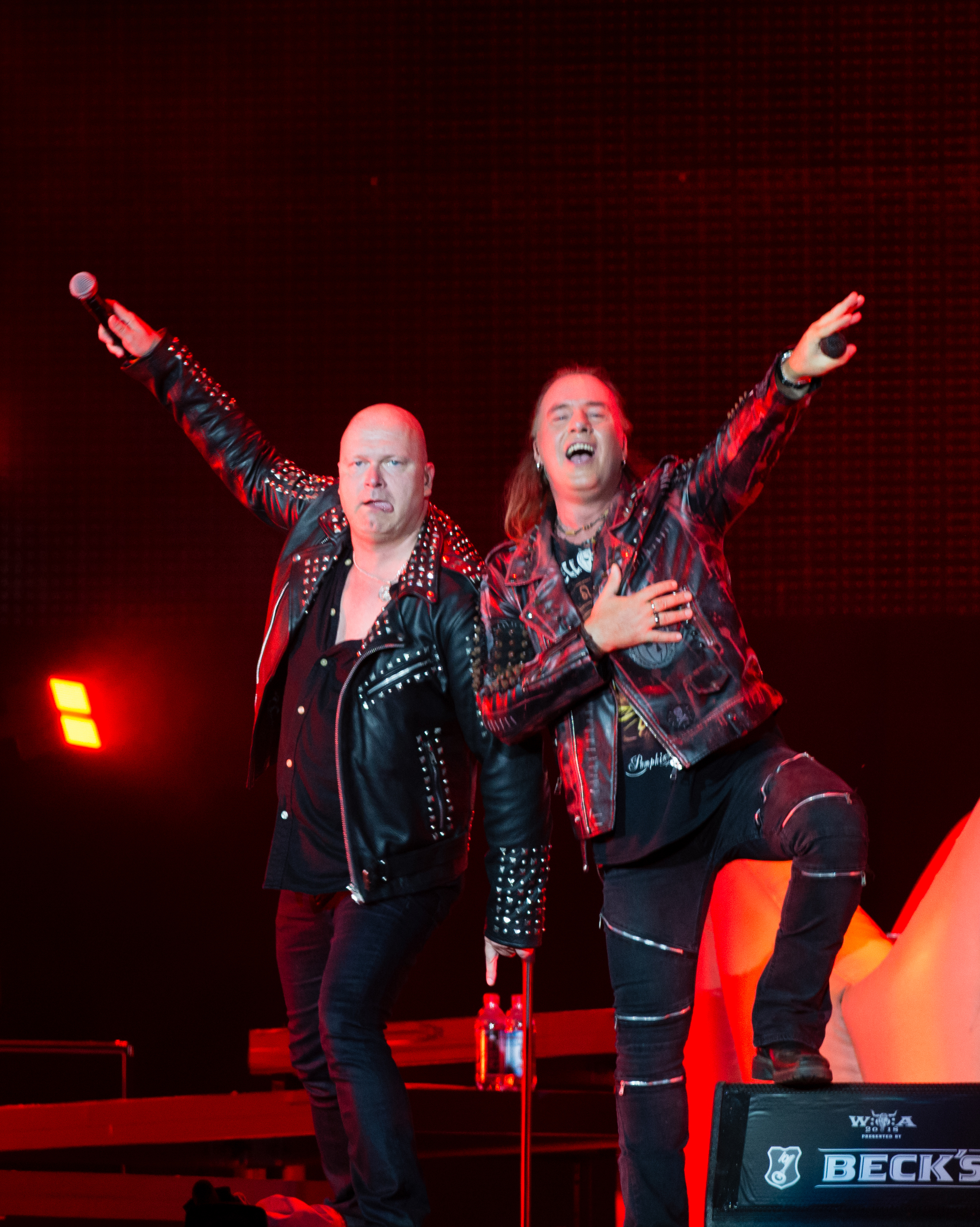
Helloween performing at Wacken Open Air in 2018. From left to right: Michael Kiske and Andi Deris.

In January 1989, guitarist Kai Hansen left Helloween and founded Gamma Ray, with whom he has played and recorded ever since. Vocalist Michael Kiske did the same in 1993 and focused on a solo career, aside from taking part in projects such as Avantasia. While Hansen remained in good terms with both the band and Kiske, the latter had not spoken to the remaining Helloween members for decades.

In 2013, guitarist Michael Weikath approached Kiske in the backstage of a festival and asked him: "what did I do that you can't forgive me?"; such question made Kiske realize he had already forgiven Weikath but failed to notice it. Following some encouragement from Hansen, by that time his bandmate at Unisonic, he agreed to join them for the Pumpkins United Tour.

Former guitarist Roland Grapow and drummer Uli Kusch were not asked to re-join, with Grosskopf stating "it would be too many people". This new line-up released an original song, "Pumpkins United", on 13 October 2017 on which Deris, Hansen, and Kiske all share lead vocals. The Pumpkins United World Tour started in Monterrey, Mexico on 19 October 2017.

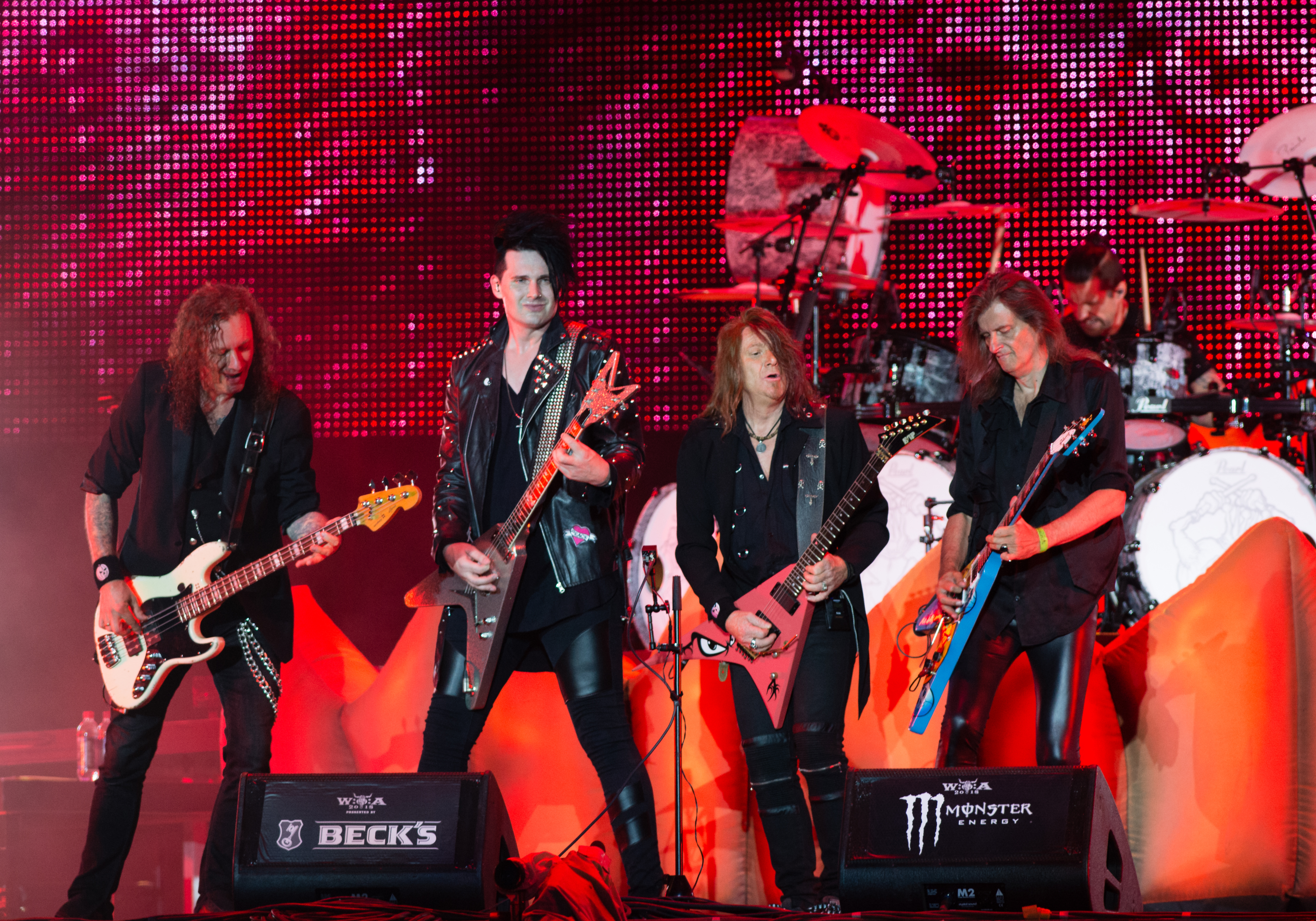
Helloween performing at Wacken Open Air in 2018. From left to right: Markus Grosskopf, Sascha Gerstner, Kai Hansen, Michael Weikath, and Daniel Löble.

About a potential studio album under the new line-up, Deris stated in March 2018: "We certainly have lots and lots of talks [about it]. This summer, if the chemistry goes on like this, then everything is possible. After recording that particular "Pumpkins United" song, we realized that it's easy working together. [...] Yeah, it was no problem at all, as if we would have worked together for decades already. So, I could see an upcoming album for the future. If the chemistry stays the way it is now, I definitely would say 99 percent yes, we're going for it." When they were interviewed together in June, Weikath stated: "We don't really feel like starting with it because it's going to be a lot of work and it's going to take a lot of time and right now, we are kind of comfy with what we are doing, so to say", while Hansen stated "There's a lot of ideas in the room for what we do next and so on. But, nothing is kind of decided. Nothing is ripe for the decision. We leave that open, kind of." Kiske was initially apprehensive about working with Deris, but was relieved to find that they had an "instant connection", and later said that sharing and assigning vocal duties was "very easy", because they were able to "very quickly hear what works best".

On 21 August 2018, the band announced that, at the request of their label Nuclear Blast, they would all remain together and that a new studio album would be recorded later in 2018 for a planned 2020 release, with Weikath, Hansen and Deris acting as a "songwriting trio". In March 2021, the album's title and release date was announced.

== Recording ==
In March 2019, Deris stated that he had written two duets between him and Kiske for the upcoming album. "Skyfall" was originally written by Hansen for himself to sing, but was eventually convinced to let Kiske and Deris sing it.

On 26 November 2019, the band published a video in which they shared that they had begun recording their next album in Hamburg (where they had previously recorded four successive albums in the 1990s, from 1993's Chameleon to 1998's Better Than Raw), and that they were planning to resume touring in late 2020. On 1 June 2020, Helloween confirmed that they had "decided to shift the release" of their new album to early next year, with Ronald Prent mixing it.

Most of the album was recorded before the COVID-19 pandemic; Kiske got back from his recording sessions in Tenerife in April 2020, shortly before flights in Europe were brought to a halt. Weikath, on the other hand, was caught in the middle of strict lockdowns and even had to spend one night at the studio.

Some of the drums of the album were recorded using former drummer Ingo Schwichtenberg's original white kit, which was used on Keeper of the Seven Keys: Part II; the band purchased the kit back from a fan after the fan approached Kiske to get the snare drum signed. The band also utilized the same effect units used when they recorded Master of the Rings, The Time of the Oath and Better Than Raw.

=== Cover art ===
The cover art was painted by hand by Eliran Kantor and selected against a number of digitally created images. Markus Staiger (founder of Nuclear Blast) was initially against it and tried to convince the band to choose another one, but the musicians' opinion prevailed.

== Reception ==
Professional ratings
Review scores
Source	Rating
AllMusic	4/5 stars
Blabbermouth.net	8/10
Sonicperspectives.com	9/10
Heavy Mag	positive
Rock Hard	9/10
Metal Hammer (Germany)	6.5/7

Writing for Blabbermouth.net, Jason Roche wrote that "The Deris and Kiske duo has tremendous chemistry" and "Hansen's axe capabilities are seamlessly interwoven alongside those of the existing duo". Writing for Sonicperspectives.com, Jonathan Smith wrote that " it's certainly up there in the short list of the best material this band has ever produced", giving the album a rating of 9/10.

Writing for Heavy Mag, Carl Neumann summarized the album as "essentially a mix of all Helloween albums in one. You have classic power metal, hard rock, speed metal and good ‘ol rock n roll all mixed into 12 songs within a duration of 65 minutes. It would be impossible for 'Helloween' to be a flop. It has EVERYTHING that is Helloween. Therefore it is aptly titled."

Sebastian Kessler, from the German edition of Metal Hammer, praised the album for not offering "flat copies of past masterpieces or denying sound and style developments of the last decades". He also considered it a good merge of Walls of Jericho, Keeper of the Seven Keys (both) and Better Than Raw.

Jens Peters, from Rock Hard, said Helloween was "THE album that every Teutonic Metal fan has been waiting for since the big split in the late eighties / early nineties". He also said that the members "work their way through the phases of their own history" and that "all the pieces have in common that you can clearly hear their respective main authors".

Writing for BraveWords, Paul Stenning offered "Huge credit must also go to Dennis Ward and Charlie Bauerfeind for their work in balancing the combination of singers and performers," and described how it is "hard to choose standout songs here as they are all classic Helloween - sometimes they recall the eighties, sometimes the early 90s and others the 2000s."

Helloween was elected by Loudwire as the 8th best rock/metal album of 2021. The publication also elected "Skyfall" as the 13th best metal song of the year.

== Track listing ==
No.	Title	Writer(s)	Vocalist(s)	Length
1.	"Out for the Glory"	Michael Weikath	Kiske, Hansen	7:18
2.	"Fear of the Fallen"	Andi Deris	Deris, Kiske	5:38
3.	"Best Time"	Sascha Gerstner, Deris	Kiske, Deris, Hansen	3:35
4.	"Mass Pollution"	Deris	Deris	4:14
5.	"Angels"	Gerstner	Kiske, Deris	4:42
6.	"Rise Without Chains"	Deris	Deris, Kiske	4:56
7.	"Indestructible"	Markus Grosskopf	Kiske, Deris, Hansen	4:42
8.	"Robot King"	Weikath	Deris, Kiske	7:07
9.	"Cyanide"	Deris	Deris	3:29
10.	"Down in the Dumps"	Weikath	Kiske, Deris, Hansen	6:01
11.	"Orbit"	Kai Hansen	Instrumental	1:04
12.	"Skyfall"	Hansen	Kiske, Deris, Hansen	12:11
Total length:				64:57

Bonus tracks
No.	Title	Writer(s)	Vocalist(s)	Length
13.	"Golden Times"	Gerstner	Kiske	4:47
14.	"Save My Hide"	Deris	Deris	3:11
15.	"Pumpkins United"	Hansen, Deris, Weikath	Kiske, Deris, Hansen	6:21
16.	"We Are Real"	Grosskopf	Hansen, Deris	4:24
Total length:				83:40

== Personnel ==
Helloween

- Michael Kiske – lead vocals
- Andi Deris – lead vocals
- Kai Hansen – guitars, lead vocals
- Michael Weikath – guitars
- Sascha Gerstner – guitars
- Markus Grosskopf – bass
- Daniel Löble – drums

Additional musicians

- Matthias Ulmer – keyboards
- Jens Johansson – keyboards on "Skyfall"
- Tim Hansen – guitar solo on "Skyfall"
- Dennis Ward – bass on "Robot King"
- Xavier Russell – narration on "Out for the Glory"

Production

- Charlie Bauerfeind, Dennis Ward – production, mixing
- Ronald Prent – mixing at Valhalla Studios (New York City)
- Eliran Kantor – cover artwork

== Charts ==
The album topped German and Spanish charts and also reached number one in sales in other countries. It also reached the highest rank a Helloween album ever reached at the Billboard, peaking at 35th.

=== Weekly charts ===
Weekly chart performance for Helloween
Chart (2021)	Peak position
Austrian Albums (Ö3 Austria)	3
Belgian Albums (Ultratop Flanders)	11
Belgian Albums (Ultratop Wallonia)	5
Czech Albums (ČNS IFPI)	5
Dutch Albums (Album Top 100)	12
Finnish Albums (Suomen virallinen lista)	2
German Albums (Offizielle Top 100)	1
Hungarian Albums (MAHASZ)	17
Italian Albums (FIMI)	14
Japanese Albums (Oricon)	6
Norwegian Albums (VG-lista)	36
Polish Albums (ZPAV)	13
Portuguese Albums (AFP)	5
Scottish Albums (OCC)	4
Spanish Albums (PROMUSICAE)	1
Swedish Albums (Sverigetopplistan)	3
Swiss Albums (Schweizer Hitparade)	2
UK Albums (OCC)	24
UK Independent Albums (OCC)	4
UK Rock & Metal Albums (OCC)	1
US Billboard 200	35

=== Year-end charts ===
Year-end chart performance for Helloween
Chart (2021)	Position
German Albums (Offizielle Top 100)	35
Swiss Albums (Schweizer Hitparade)	91
