= Keeper of the Seven Keys – The Legacy World Tour 2005/2006 =

Live album by Helloween
- Released: 23 February 2007 (UK)
- Recorded: 2005/2006
- Genre: Power metal
- Length: 1:58:08
- Label: SPV/Steamhammer

Helloween chronology
Keeper of the Seven Keys: The Legacy (2005)	Keeper of the Seven Keys – The Legacy World Tour 2005/2006 (2007)	Gambling with the Devil (2007)

Professional ratings
Review scores
Source	Rating
Allmusic	3.5/5 stars
Sputnikmusic	3/5 stars

Keeper of the Seven Keys – The Legacy World Tour 2005/2006 is the third live album by German power metal band Helloween, released in February 2007. It was recorded in São Paulo (Brazil), Sofia (Bulgaria) and Tokyo (Japan). The album contains the CD Live In São Paulo and the DVD Live On 3 Continents.

== CD ==
=== Track listing ===
==== Disc one ====
No.	Title	Writer(s)	Length
1.	"Intro"		2:07
2.	"The King for a 1000 Years"	Andi Deris, Sascha Gerstner, Markus Grosskopf, Dani Löble, Michael Weikath	13:17
3.	"Eagle Fly Free"	Weikath	5:49
4.	"Hell Was Made in Heaven"	Deris, Grosskopf	6:35
5.	"Keeper of the Seven Keys"	Weikath	13:32
6.	"A Tale That Wasn't Right"	Weikath	5:19
7.	"Mr. Torture"	Uli Kusch	4:29
8.	"If I Could Fly"	Deris	4:09
9.	"Power"	Weikath	3:48

==== Disc two ====
No.	Title	Writer(s)	Length
1.	"Future World"	Kai Hansen	10:04
2.	"The Invisible Man"	Gerstner	8:38
3.	"Mrs. God"	Deris	2:55
4.	"I Want Out"	Hansen	5:34
5.	"Dr. Stein"	Weikath	7:49
6.	"Occasion Avenue (bonus)"	Deris	10:24
7.	"Halloween (bonus)"	Hansen	13:39

== DVD ==
=== Track listing ===
==== Disc one ====
1. "Intro" (São Paulo)
2. "The King For A 1000 Years" (São Paulo)
3. "Eagle Fly Free" (São Paulo)
4. "Hell Was Made In Heaven" (São Paulo)
5. "Keeper Of The Seven Keys" (São Paulo - alternative view Sofia)
6. "A Tale That Wasn't Right" (São Paulo - alternative view Sofia)
7. "Drum Solo" (Edit from São Paulo, Sofia and Tokyo)
8. "Mr. Torture" (São Paulo - alternative view Tokyo)
9. "If I Could Fly" (São Paulo)
10. "Guitar Solo" (Edit from São Paulo, Sofia and Tokyo)
11. "Power" (São Paulo)
12. "Future World" (São Paulo)
13. "The Invisible Man" (São Paulo)
14. "Mrs. God" (São Paulo)
15. "I Want Out" (São Paulo - alternative view Sofia)
16. "Dr. Stein" (São Paulo - alternative view Tokyo)
17. "Outro" (São Paulo)

==== Disc two ====
1. "Occasion Avenue" (Tokyo)
2. "Halloween" (Masters Of Rock, Vizovice CZ)
3. Roadmovie
4. Interviews
5. "Mrs. God" (Video Clip)
6. "Light The Universe" (Video Clip)

== Credits ==
- Andi Deris - Vocals
- Michael Weikath - Guitars
- Sascha Gerstner - Guitars
- Markus Grosskopf - Bass
- Dani Löble - Drums
