= Giants & Monsters =

Studio album by Helloween
- Released: 29 August 2025
- Recorded: 2024–2025
- Studio: Streetlife (Fürth); Mi Sueño (Tenerife); Hansen (Košice); Shockhouse (Hamburg); Pace Arts (Berlin)
- Genre: Power metal
- Length: 50:35
- Label: Reigning Phoenix
- Producer: Charlie Bauerfeind; Dennis Ward

Helloween chronology
Live at Budokan (2024)	Giants & Monsters (2025)

Singles from Giants & Monsters
- 1. "This Is Tokyo" Released: 13 June 2025; 2. "Universe (Gravity for Hearts)" Released: 25 July 2025; 3. "A Little Is a Little Too Much" Released: 29 August 2025

Giants & Monsters is the seventeenth studio album by German power metal band Helloween, released on 29 August 2025. It is the second studio album recorded by the "Pumpkins United" lineup and the band's first studio album released on Reigning Phoenix Music.

It was preceded by three singles: "This Is Tokyo", released on 13 June 2025; "Universe (Gravity for Hearts)", released on 25 July 2025; and "A Little Is a Little Too Much", released with the whole album on 29 August 2025.

Giants & Monsters was released as an earbook with a bonus CD, digipak CD with a bonus track, jewel case CD, double LP gatefold, picture double LP with a bonus track and on digital platforms.

== Background and recording ==
The band started working on the album as early as March 2023 and entered the studio in mid-2024. The songs were worked as demos for 5-6 months until an online meeting in which the members decided on the tracklist. According to vocalist Michael Kiske, the band wrote over 20 songs that they considered "great" and the next album was, therefore, already written. Vocalist Andi Deris told Billboard Brasil that they created a total of 23 songs, 10 of which were picked by the management staff for the album.

Recording took up to five more months and mixing was done at Wisseloord Studios. Drummer Daniel Löble used three different drum kits in the album.

In an interview for Finnish magazine Chaoszine, Deris said he didn't feel any pressure when preparing the album because he believes the band "proved itself" in the previous album. Both him and guitarist and vocalist Kai Hansen agreed that the album sounds "more focused and direct" than the predecessor. Kiske endorsed that in an interview for Sonic Perspectives, saying that things were "much easier. Because it's like when we did the last one, everything was new.[...] This time it was way more relaxed and everything seemed to fall into place very naturally. And I think the album is more organic. … The previous one, I personally thought, was a bit overloaded. This was much easier to listen to."

Kiske reinforced his opinion in an interview for Roadie Crew, claiming the band is "more in harmony" now, while for the first album everybody was "getting to know each other". He even said the previous album was "a bit overloaded, I'd say, for my taste. It is a bit exaggerated, it has too much information". Kiske then clarified he was referring to the solos and instrumental parts in general.

== Music and themes ==
Bassist Markus Grosskopf described Giants & Monsters as "a great heavy rock album", with a "pop rock attitude and some long, epic or progressive songs". The lyrics deal with reincarnation, cosmic unity and human struggle, with Kiske linking this to "a shared spiritual outlook among the members. [...] We see the darkness. It's not that we make ourselves blind to it, but we believe in good. And we believe that you have to feed that. … And that's why it sometimes seems almost like it's a concept album, but it isn't. There was no talking before. We didn't make any plans. It just naturally fell into place."

=== Title ===
According to Deris, the album refers to "the giants we could be and the monsters we have to fight against in our lives again and again and again". In an interview to Metal Hammer Greece's TV War, Deris elaborated on the meaning of the "giants" when describing the opening track "Giants on the Run" (see below); Hansen added that "you have to fight the monsters. [...] the demons you have to fight and everyday struggle. Then you could go to the Anunnaki, the return of the gods from outer space, giant people and so on. There's a lot of room for fantasy, I think." Deris added that it could be traced back to the Bible, as well.

=== Cover art ===
The album cover art was revealed on 6 June, once again designed by Eliran Kantor, who commented that "with the previous album cover giving the spotlight to the Keeper, I wanted this one to allow Jack O' to get the focus. With uplifting lyrics about mankind's positive inner potential, Jack O' manifests an everflowing fountain of water ushering a flood that's drowning the monsters. The style of the painting itself is a tip of the hat to the video games I grew up on, those were the superheroes that had an impact on me, and I still reach out to those playfull instincts when approaching creativity."

== Song information ==
According to Deris, the opening track "Giants on the Run" was written by him and then Hansen added "a whole new song" in the middle, and he thought it was "perfect". Its lyrics discuss a conspiracy theory according to which people are deliberately "put down" in society so as to not fully express their dreams and ideas.

Regarding "Savior of the World", songwriter and guitarist Michael Weikath said that "someone out there is maybe taking everything upon him what we can't do. And I am telling myself I am too old and I would mess it up anyway, hopefully someone else is taking it on."

"A Little Is a Little Too Much" talks about how small excesses can lead to big trouble, like the last drop that makes a cup overflow. Deris, who penned it, based it on his earliest teenage experiences, including sex, but claims the message stretches out to the concept of small things getting out of control; he got the initial inspiration to write it during a walk to the beach, which he believes he would have enjoyed more if he had his mind free of "this a little, little, just too much". Kiske saw Scorpions influences on the song, which prompted him to add harmonies to make the song even more Scorpions-esque. Guitarist Sascha Gerstner conceived the video and says he wanted to bring back the spirit of videos of old songs such as "I Want Out".

Regarding "We Can Be Gods", songwriter Hansen said that "We are trapped in our lives due to circumstances, the world outside and own decisions and there might be moments in our lives where we really take our destiny in our own hands and then we actually can be gods. Making things big and being determined. Do something big for ourselves and our surrounding."

"Into the Sun" is a re-recorded version of the song, which had originally been recorded for the previous album, but ended up removed from the final track listing because the band wasn't happy with its post-production work. For Giants & Monsters, four different versions were released: the standard one, featuring both Deris and Kiske; two versions with each of them singing solo; and a classical version. Its lyrics are about reincarnation, but were originally about an orgasm, but Deris changed the subject after deciding to make it a duet with Kiske. Weikath compared its verses to Queen's "The Show Must Go On", besides hailing it as "the best ballad ever written" by Deris.

"This Is Tokyo" was released as the album's first single. According to Deris, he "always wanted to write this song" since "Japan plays a special role in my life because I had my first big successes there". The decision to name it after the city rather than the country was purely because he thought the former sounds better than the latter, but the city represents the whole country in the song. Deris also thought both singles are more "pop metal" and help "loosen a bit the tension of the album".

About the second single "Universe (Gravity for Hearts)", songwriter Gerstner commented that "everything in the universe is connected, and what looks like infinite stars could in reality be moments, hearts, and choices. He was inspired to write it after looking at the night sky and conceiving the idea that each star represents a "heart that's counting". "Hand of God", also written by Gerstner, is related to death and how people reflect on their lives as the end comes near. According to him, "it could be from a religious point of view but it could be generally about all the decisions you've made in life."

"Under the Moonlight" was written by Weikath about acquiring all the things one yearns for but still feeling the same as before, while also discussing "habits. Some people do strange or forbidden things in the backrooms and think they are great and need to get more and more and more..." Deris saw Queen influences on this track, as well.

The closing track "Majestic" was described as having elements of UFO's "Love to Love" (in its intro) and Queensrÿche's "Queen of the Reich". It was originally written by Hansen for his other band Gamma Ray, but it remained unfinished. It is inspired by ancient astronauts beliefs and he says the chorus ("here we are, the majestic, the masters") could be about the band itself ("masters of power metal"), but he prefers to leave it for the listeners to interpret.

== Reception ==
Professional ratings
Review scores
Source	Rating
Classic Rock	4/5 stars
Angry Metal Guy	3.5/5.0
Zware Metalen	85/100
My Global Mind	8/10
Rock Hard	9,0
Metal.de	8/10

Writing for Echoes and Dust, Geoff Topley praised the album, production and performance-wise, and called it "a brilliant album that makes no apologies for the sounds therein. The band are unashamed in not taking themselves too seriously and just enjoy creating music they love, and their fans can appreciate. Superbly polished and produced and not a note wasted, it packs a lot into the run time. [...] Giants & Monsters is a cracking metal album bursting with big tunes [...]."

Classic Rock's Dave Everley compared Giants & Monsters favorably to its predecessor, citing that the latter was "an obvious desire to not reignite past acrimonies lent it an air of cautiousness". He denied it as a power metal album, classifying it as a "thoroughly modern melodic metal album", as concluded by saying that "this bulked-out line-up could easily have tripped over their own feet, but they've avoided it. 'The masters we are!' Kiske sings on closing mini-epic Majestic. He's not singing about Helloween, but he might as well be."

Steel Druhm wrote on Angry Metal Guy that "Giants and Monsters is a weird collection of styles, and it's only a power metal album about 30% of the time. [...] There's a looseness to the writing, suggesting that the group has become more comfortable working together, and as a result, you get a wide-ranging set of songs covering everything from classic power metal to hair metal and stadium rock". He praised the vocals and guitar work, said there are "are no duds present, and every song has its weird charms and endearing quirks. At 52 minutes, Giants and Monsters avoids feeling long despite the presence of multiple 8-minute epics." He finished by calling it a "stronger, more refined album overall" than Helloween.

Michiel Hoogkamer, at Zware Metal, also compared it favorably to the previous album, saying the overall sound "feels far more consistent, and the album flows more naturally as a unified listening experience." He also praised the "balanced" production and mix for allowing most songs to "hold their own impressively". On the other hand, he criticized "This Is Tokyo" and "Hand of God" as "a bit too simplistic and repetitive". He praised the three-guitar, three-vocal work, commented that "Helloween still sounds best when they go all out: full speed, full variety, full epic grandeur—in both vocals and guitar work" and concluded by saying that "by occasionally pulling back on certain fronts, the band is likely to keep fans from all eras on board".

Sam Jones, writing for The Razor's Edge, said the seven-men line-up of the band "has also aided Helloween in championing this massive soundscape where every member gets their due across every song so there's hardly a time where you'll feel something is being neglected or waylaid for another track". He said "their riffs feel more accentuated, organised, whereby the band strengthen that impact". He also praised the "cristal clean" production, because of which "everything regarding Helloween is on fullest display", and commended the band for "restraining" in some moments instead of delivering full power from start to finish. He concluded by saying that the band "blow any naysayers out of the water to deliver a massive-sounding, triumphant record".

My Global Mind's Travis Green called Giants & Monsters "an excellent album overall" and analyzed that is had more "experimental" tracks than its predecessor, sometimes falling into "hard rock and melodic metal territory", commenting that "this is one of the band's most varied albums in quite some time". He praised the guitar and vocal work, but thought that "this is a noticeable step back into more 'normal' quality" compared to Helloween, also noticing what he saw as "inconsistency" among the tracks. He concluded by calling the album "a bit of a frustrating release, but also one which sums up Helloween as a whole pretty well".

Rock Hard, via Jens Peters, named Giants & Monsters "their best album this side of the millennium" and said the band "succeeded brilliantly" in making the album reflect their 42-year history. Jürgen Fenske discussed at Metal.de how much Giants & Monsters could be seen as a "Helloween Part II", and concluded that "it all depends on the perspective [...]. There's more mainstream music on "Giants & Monsters" than on "Helloween." However, what the pumpkin heads almost consistently achieve is delivering a cohesive LP. [...] Ultimately, there is once again a top genre representative that is somewhat more focused on consensus and the mass market than its predecessor from 2021".

== Track listing ==
Giants & Monsters track listing
No.	Title	Writer(s)	Vocalist(s)	Length
1.	"Giants on the Run"	Andi Deris, Kai Hansen	Deris, Hansen	6:21
2.	"Savior of the World"	Michael Weikath	Kiske	4:14
3.	"A Little Is a Little Too Much"	Deris	Kiske, Deris	3:30
4.	"We Can Be Gods"	Hansen	Hansen, Kiske, Deris	5:11
5.	"Into the Sun"	Deris	Kiske, Deris	3:40
6.	"This Is Tokyo"	Deris	Deris, Kiske	4:14
7.	"Universe (Gravity for Hearts)"	Sascha Gerstner	Kiske, Hansen	8:24
8.	"Hand of God"	Gerstner	Deris	3:45
9.	"Under the Moonlight"	Weikath	Kiske	3:08
10.	"Majestic"	Hansen	Hansen, Kiske, Deris	8:08

Limited edition bonus tracks
No.	Title	Writer(s)	Vocalist(s)	Length
11.	"Out of Control"	Markus Grosskopf	Hansen	4:43
12.	"Into the Sun (Deris version)"	Deris	Deris	3:40
13.	"Into the Sun (Kiske version)"	Deris	Kiske	3:40
14.	"Into the Sun (duet acoustic version)"	Deris	Kiske, Deris	3:40

== Personnel ==
Credits adapted from the album's liner notes.

=== Helloween ===
- Andi Deris – vocals
- Michael Kiske – vocals
- Michael Weikath – guitars
- Kai Hansen – vocals, guitars
- Markus Grosskopf – bass
- Sascha Gerstner – guitars
- Daniel Löble – drums

=== Additional contributors ===
- Charlie Bauerfeind – production, recording, mixing
- Dennis Ward – production, recording, mixing, background vocals
- Sascha "Busy" Bühren – mastering
- Laura "Zauberdame" Morina – mastering
- Matthias Ulmer – keyboards, keyboard arrangement
- William Billy King – background vocals
- Maria Valiskova – background vocals
- Andrew Skrabutenas – orchestral arrangement and programming on "Into the Sun"
- Nicolo Fragile – additional keyboards on "Out of Control"
- Oliver Hartmann – acoustic guitar on "Into the Sun"
- Eliran Kantor – cover artwork
- Mathias Bothor – band photography
- Thomas Ewerhard – artwork, design
- Marcos Moura – pumpkin sketches

== Charts ==
Chart performance for Giants & Monsters
Chart (2025)	Peak position
Austrian Albums (Ö3 Austria)	5
Belgian Albums (Ultratop Flanders)	32
Belgian Albums (Ultratop Wallonia)	21
Czech Albums (ČNS IFPI)	51
Dutch Albums (Album Top 100)	35
Finnish Albums (Suomen virallinen lista)	7
French Albums (SNEP)	55
French Rock & Metal Albums (SNEP)	5
German Albums (Offizielle Top 100)	3
German Rock & Metal Albums (Offizielle Top 100)	1
Greek Albums (IFPI)	7
Hungarian Physical Albums (MAHASZ)	11
Italian Albums (FIMI)	43
Japanese Albums (Oricon)	15
Japanese Combined Albums (Oricon)	16
Japanese Download Albums (Billboard Japan)	15
Japanese Top Albums Sales (Billboard Japan)	14
Norwegian Albums (IFPI Norge)	51
Polish Albums (ZPAV)	3
Portuguese Albums (AFP)	75
Scottish Albums (Official Charts)	20
Spanish Albums (PROMUSICAE)	11
Swedish Albums (Sverigetopplistan)	6
Swedish Hard Rock Albums (Sverigetopplistan)	1
Swiss Albums (Schweizer Hitparade)	3
UK Albums Sales (OCC)	16
UK Independent Albums (Official Charts)	8
UK Rock & Metal Albums (Official Charts)	4
US Top Album Sales (Billboard)	49
