= Daniel Löble =

Swiss-German drummer

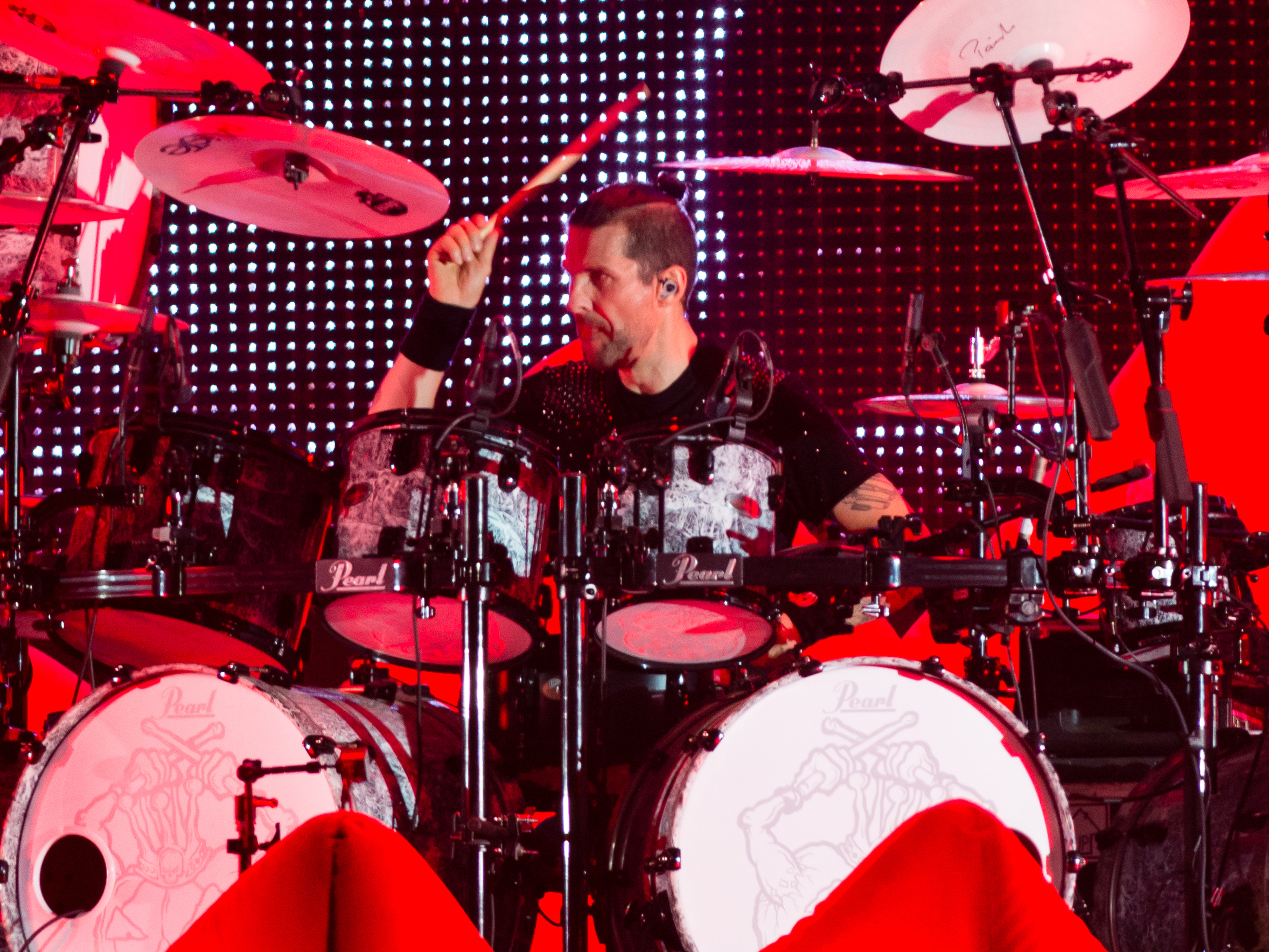
- Löble performing with Helloween in 2018

Background information
- Born: 22 February 1973 (age 53); Zürich, Switzerland
- Genres: Power metal, speed metal, heavy metal
- Occupation: Drummer
- Instrument: Drums
- Years active: 1978–present
- Website: www.helloween.org

Daniel "Dani" Löble (born 22 February 1973) is a Swiss-German drummer, who has been a member of German power metal band Helloween since 2005.

== Biography ==
Dani began his career with Rawhead Rexx, a band that he helped form but departed due to his new commitments to Helloween. He was also a touring drummer for Blaze Bayley from October 2004 to December 2005. He lives in Steißlingen.

Regarding his role in Helloween when compared to his two predecessors, Ingo Schwichtenberg and Uli Kusch, Dani was quoted as saying: "I view my style as a symbiosis of Schwichtenberg and Kusch. I'm not as straightforward as Ingo but not as technical as Uli. I have my own style."

In August 2008, Dani signed an endorsement deal with Paiste and states being extremely happy with his new cymbal setup, which features the new Signature Reflector Heavy Full Crash models and describes them as being warm, full, and 'sounding straight as an arrow' with a silvery shimmer.

== Discography ==
=== Höllenhunde ===
- Alptraum (1994)

=== Element 58 ===
- April Fools' Day (2000)

=== Rawhead Rexx ===
- Rawhead Rexx (AFM Records, 2002)
- Diary In Black (AFM Records, 2004)

=== Helloween ===
- Keeper of the Seven Keys: The Legacy (2005)
- Keeper of the Seven Keys – The Legacy World Tour 2005/2006 (2007)
- Gambling with the Devil (2007)
- Unarmed – Best of 25th Anniversary (2009)
- 7 Sinners (2010)
- Straight Out of Hell (2013)
- My God-Given Right (2015)
- United Alive in Madrid (2019)
- Helloween (2021)
- Live at Budokan (2024)
- Giants & Monsters (2025)

=== DVDs ===
- Keeper Of The Seven Keys - The Legacy: Live On 3 Continents (2007)
- United Alive in Madrid (2019)
- Live at Budokan (2024)
