= Andi Deris =

German singer (born 1964)

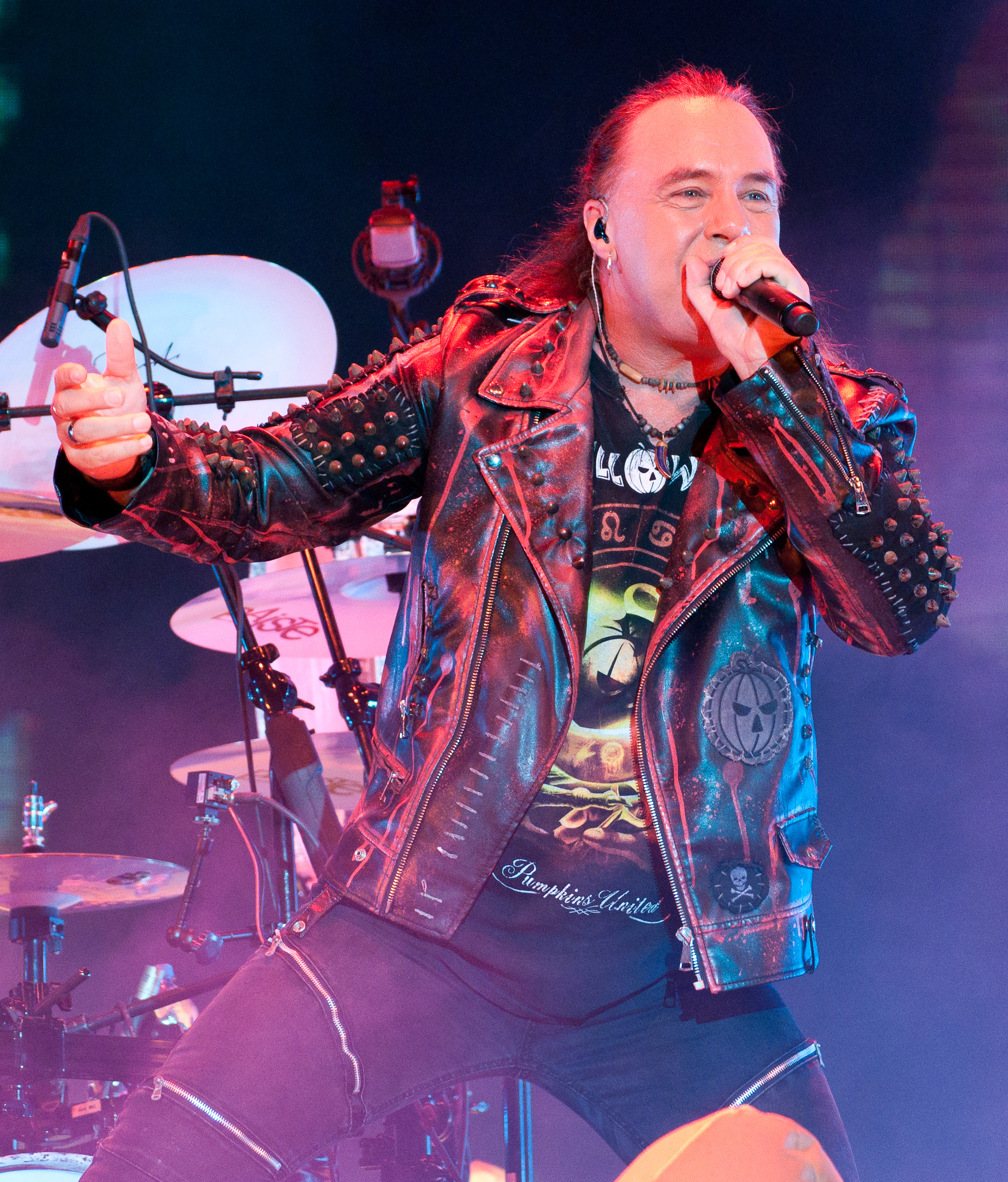
- Deris at Masters of Rock 2018

Background information
- Born: Andreas Deris; 18 August 1964 (age 61); Karlsruhe, West Germany
- Genres: Power metal, heavy metal, speed metal, hard rock
- Occupations: Singer, songwriter, musician
- Instruments: Vocals, guitar (early)
- Years active: 1979–present
- Member of: Helloween
- Formerly of: Pink Cream 69

Andreas "Andi" Deris (born 18 August 1964) is a German singer, best known as one of the three co-lead vocalists of the power metal band Helloween, and co-founder and former lead singer of the metal band Pink Cream 69.

== Singing style ==
Deris has a high baritone type voice and possesses an almost 4 octave vocal range, with a melodic and aggressive vocal, always using the voice mix.

== Biography ==
=== First bands (1979–1987) ===
Deris was born in Karlsruhe and started to sing in his first band, Paranoid, when he was 15. Two years later, they changed the band's name to Nameless. In Nameless, Deris stayed along with his school friend, drummer Ralf Maurer, who also played on both Deris' solo albums. In late 1984, Deris joined a band called Dragon with the two brothers Bruno and Oscar Di Blasio ("Di Blasio BrOs") on guitar, and Bernd and Stefan Lüddemann (bass and drums).

After playing live concerts in the Karlsruhe area, they went to Edo Zanki's studio in Karlsdorf and to Arco Studio, Munich, to record their first demo with producer Tony Monn. The following songs were recorded: "I Was Made to Be With You", "Call Me Up", "Woman", "I Hear the Angels Singing", "Ballade of Glory", and "Rock Your Body Down". During the production of the demo, drummer Bodo Schopf (ex-Michael Schenker Group) recorded some drum-parts. In 1986, when Bruno and Oscar Di Blasio, together with Deris (who had just finished military service), met Italian bass player Daniel De Niro, Kymera was born. Ralf Maurer alias "Ralph Mason" was again recruited as the new drummer of the band.

Soon after, Kymera went to the Katapult-Tonstudio in Karlsruhe to record new songs for Francis, Day and Hunter GmbH Publishing. The following songs were recorded: "Hello U.S.A.", "Hot Looking Romeo", "Send Me a Letter", and rearranged versions of "I Was Made to Be with You", "Call Me Up", and "Woman". After a few concerts, Maurer quit Kymera to go to university and was replaced by a young Kosta Zafiriou, and the line-up of Kymera was complete again. Soon, the band went to a studio in Mainz to record "Shadows Are Falling", "Lonely Would Be Loving You", and a new version of "Ballade of Glory", and played many live dates in Germany until the end of 1986. In the beginning of 1987, Deris and Kosta Zafiriou left Kymera to form the band Pink Cream 69.

Deris was hired for the recording sessions for No Mercy, a band-project based in Appenweier/Offenburg in South Germany, founded by three locals: Bobby Benz (bass), Rüdiger Föll (drums), and Uwe Ulm (lead guitar). He also played two gigs with No Mercy. On the second and last gig, Pink Cream 69 played as a support band for No Mercy; on that evening Deris was the lead singer for both bands and hit the stage twice, opening with the very first lineup of Pink Cream 69.

=== Pink Cream 69 (1987–1993) ===
In 1987, when Deris was 22, Pink Cream 69 was officially formed, with the original lineup of Dennis Ward, Kosta Zafiriou, Alfred Koffler and Deris. The band signed with CBS (now known as Sony Music). Pink Cream toured in Europe, America and Japan, and recorded three albums with Deris on vocal duties. In 1992, they released a live video titled Size It up – Live in Japan.

=== Helloween and solo career (1993–present) ===
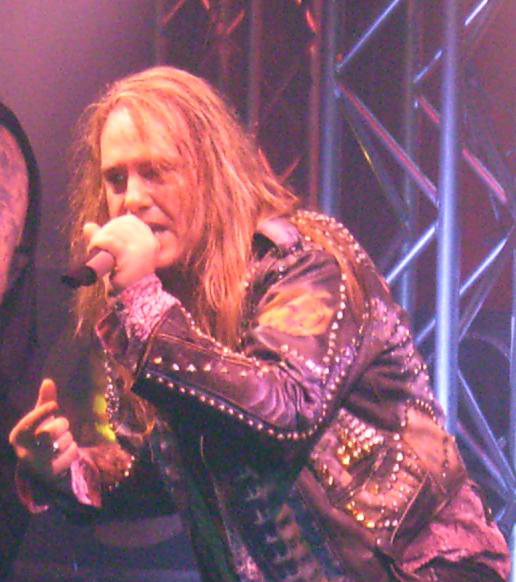
Deris performing with Helloween in 2006

In 1993, Helloween was undergoing lineup changes. Gone was Ingo Schwichtenberg, replaced by ex-Gamma Ray drummer Uli Kusch, and Michael Kiske, replaced by Deris. The new lineup recorded Master of the Rings. Deris immediately became a songwriter for the band, resulting in tunes like "Why?", "Perfect Gentleman" and "In the Middle of a Heartbeat". The Time of the Oath in 1996 further lifted up the band's album sales, culminating in a world tour and a concert DVD along with double-CD live album, High Live, set from three concerts in Spain and Italy. While Helloween would go on a break, Deris would record his first solo album, Come In from the Rain. Deris sang and played guitar, accompanied by Peter Idera (guitar), Ralph Maison (drums and backing vocals), and Gisbert Royder (bass).

In 1998, Helloween recorded Better Than Raw in Tenerife, Spain, where he currently lives.

In 1999, Helloween released the cover album Metal Jukebox and Deris' second solo album, Done by Mirrors (released in Japan; released 2000 in other parts of the world due to record company conflicts), featuring Deris once again on vocals and guitars, Don Pupillo on lead guitar, Maison and Royder. Helloween's The Dark Ride also came in 2000.

After the supporting tour for The Dark Ride, Helloween fired Roland Grapow and Uli Kusch. Rabbit Don't Come Easy would be released in 2003, featuring the band's first tour in the United States since 1989. In 2005, Keeper of the Seven Keys: The Legacy was released. The first single and video was Deris' song "Mrs. God". For the first time in the band's history, there was a duet, with Candice Night of Blackmore's Night, in the song "Light the Universe". It was the second single and the second video for the album. A live double-DVD video with documentary and live double-CD was released in February 2007.

Helloween completed their twelfth studio album Gambling with the Devil, released on 23 October 2007. "As Long as I Fall", the first single, was released in early September and available only via download (save for Japan, where it was released on CD). Since then, Helloween also released Unarmed – Best of 25th Anniversary (2009), 7 Sinners (2010), Straight Out of Hell (2013), and My God-Given Right (2015). A new solo album was also released, called Million-Dollar Haircuts on Ten-Cent Heads, in November 2013.

== Personal life ==
Deris has a son born in 1990 or 1991. Since 1996, he has resided in Tenerife, Canary Islands, Spain.

== Discography ==
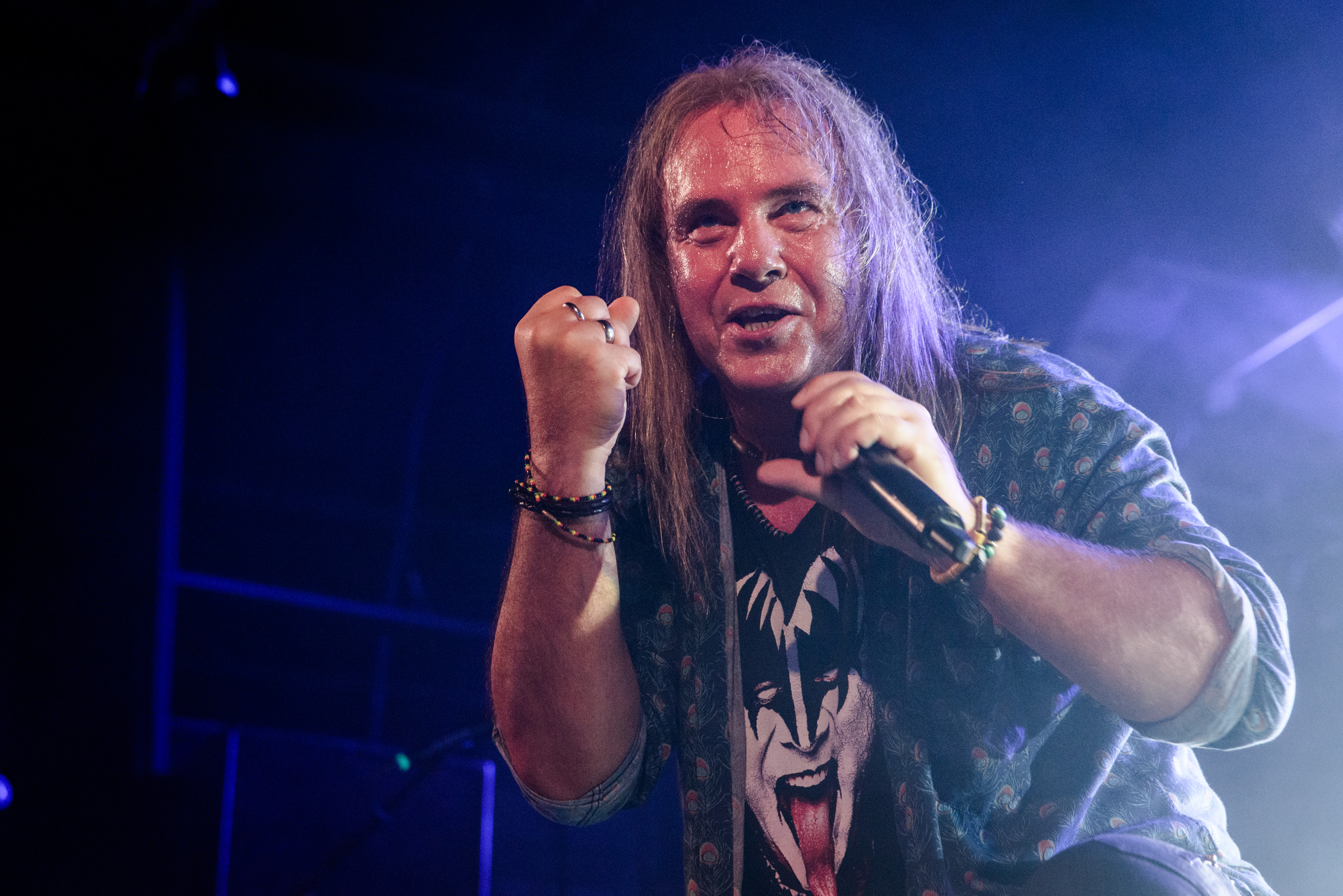
Deris performing in 2016

Studio albums:

- Come in from the Rain (1997)
- Done by Mirrors (1999)
- Million-Dollar Haircuts on Ten-Cent Heads (2013)

=== Helloween ===
Studio albums:

- Master of the Rings (1994)
- The Time of the Oath (1996)
- Better Than Raw (1998)
- The Dark Ride (2000)
- Rabbit Don't Come Easy (2003)
- Keeper of the Seven Keys – The Legacy (2005)
- Gambling with the Devil (2007)
- 7 Sinners (2010)
- Straight Out of Hell (2013)
- My God-Given Right (2015)
- Helloween (2021)
- Giants & Monsters (2025)

Live albums:

- High Live (1996)
- Keeper of the Seven Keys – The Legacy World Tour 2005/2006 (2007)
- United Alive in Madrid (2019)
- Live at Budokan (2024)

=== Pink Cream 69 ===
Studio albums:

- Pink Cream 69 (1989)
- One Size Fits All (1991)
- Games People Play (1993)

=== No Mercy ===
- No Mercy (1987)

== See also ==
- List of Ayreon guest musicians
