= Helloween (EP) =

EP by Helloween
- Released: 29 April 1985
- Recorded: January–February 1985
- Studio: Musiclab Studio, Berlin, Germany
- Genre: Speed metal
- Length: 26:22
- Label: Noise
- Producer: Helloween

Helloween chronology
Helloween (1985)	Walls of Jericho (1985)

Professional ratings
Review scores
Source	Rating
AllMusic	4/5 stars
Collector's Guide to Heavy Metal	6/10
Metal Forces	9/10

Helloween is the debut EP by German power metal band Helloween. It was released on 29 April 1985 on Noise Records.

== Background ==
Although it is a speed metal rather than a power metal album, the record is significant as the first effort by the group that would redefine the power metal genre. Helloween was followed up later that same year by the band's first full-length album, Walls of Jericho.

== Track listing ==
All tracks are written by Kai Hansen, except where noted.

No.	Title	Writer(s)	Length
1.	"Starlight"	Michael Weikath • Hansen	5:17
2.	"Murderer"		4:26
3.	"Warrior"		4:00
4.	"Victim of Fate"		6:37
5.	"Cry for Freedom"	Weikath • Hansen	6:02
Total length:			26:22

1986 12" Picture Disc Vinyl Bonus Tracks
No.	Title	Writer(s)	Length
6.	"Surprise Track" (White Christmas/I'll Be Your Santa Claus)	Traditional	2:08

1996 Korean Bonus Tracks
No.	Title	Writer(s)	Length
6.	"Reptile"	Weikath	3:44
7.	"Phantoms of Death"		6:34
8.	"Oernst of Life" (From the 1984 Death Metal compilation)	Weikath	4:46

== Notes ==
- The "Happy Happy Halloween" intro piece from "Starlight" is taken from the 1982 horror film Halloween III: Season of the Witch.
- The surprise track on the picture disc re-release features vocalist Michael Kiske, which is his first recording with Helloween. The EP was released in December 1986 in conjunction with his introduction in the band. The "White Christmas" piece features Kiske, Michael Weikath and Kai Hansen on vocals, while the "I'll Be Your Santa Claus" piece features only Kiske on vocals.
- A 1997 unofficial cassette release by Moon Records titles the album as Judas with a different album cover, and features the songs "How Many Tears", "Perfect Gentleman" and "Steel Tormentor".
- A 1998 unofficial CD release by Agat Company contains the 1996 single "Power".
- A 2017 Malaysian CD release features the songs "Don't Run for Cover" and "Judas", from Walls of Jericho.

== Personnel ==
Helloween

- Kai Hansen – vocals, guitar
- Michael Weikath – guitar
- Markus Grosskopf – bass
- Ingo Schwichtenberg – drums

Additional personnel

- Helloween – production, cover concept
- Harris Johns – engineering, mixing
- Uwe Karczewski – cover design
