= Michael Weikath =

German guitarist (born 1962)

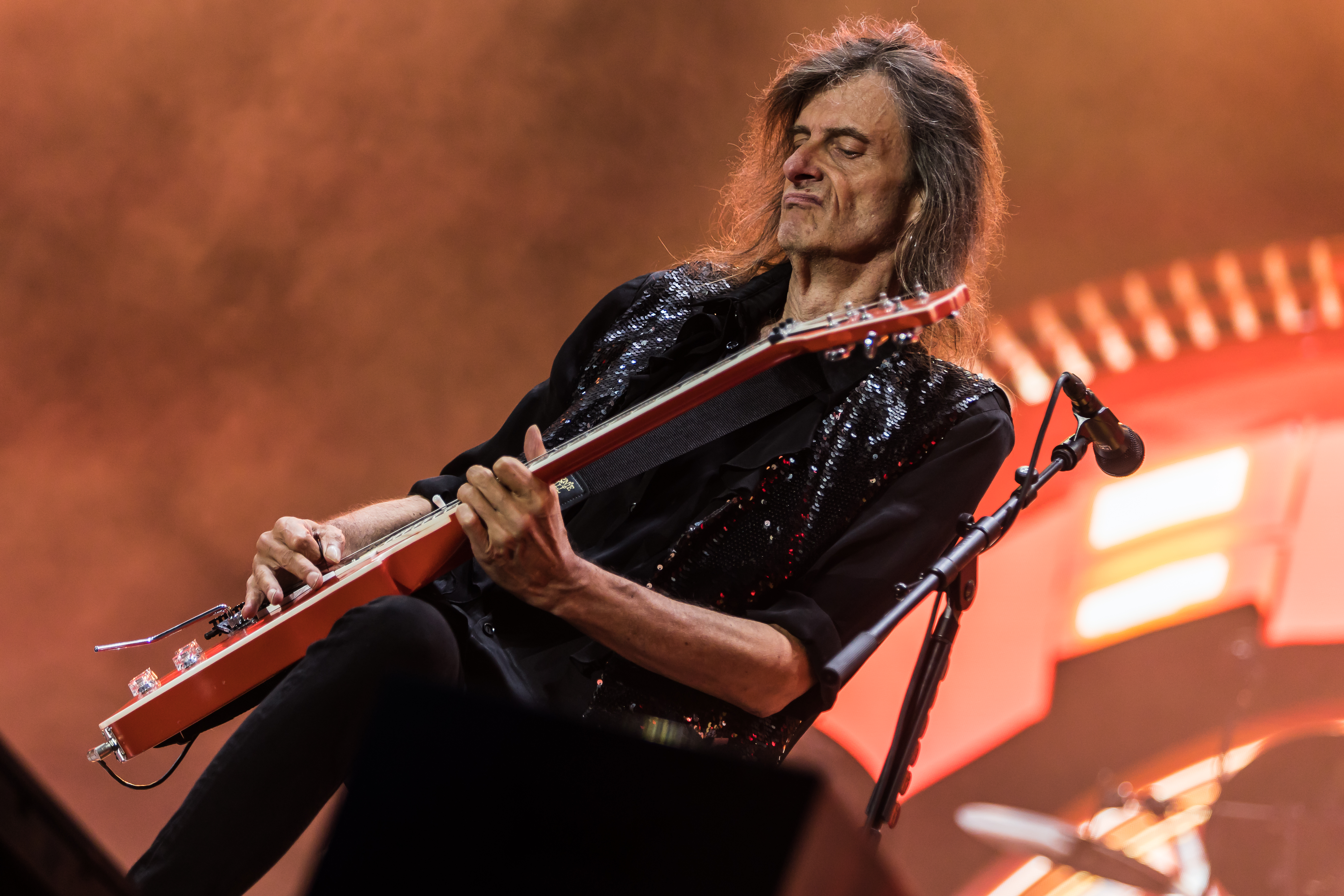
- Weikath performing in 2026

Background information
- Also known as: Weiki
- Born: Michael Ingo Joachim Weikath; 7 August 1962 (age 64); Hamburg, West Germany
- Genres: Power metal; speed metal
- Occupations: Guitarist
- Years active: 1978–present
- Member of: Helloween
- Formerly of: Powerfool

Michael Ingo Joachim "Weiki" Weikath (born 7 August 1962) is a German musician, best known as a founding member and one of the guitarists of pioneering power metal band Helloween.

== Biography ==
Weikath was born in Hamburg and was musical from a very early age. As a four to five-year-old, he would lie in the grass, looking at the sky, and come up with melodies in his head. He began taking a serious interest in music in 1971 and spent much of his time as a child at the tube stereo set of his parents, listening to all the stations available at the time. The first album he owned was 1962–1966 by The Beatles.

In 1974, Weikath started playing the guitar and later on began rehearsing with his friends. He formed his first band, Powerfool, in 1978. Prior to forming Helloween, he worked for a record mail order company. In 1982, he served heavy social duty as an alternative to military service. The main bands that have had an influence on him are The Beatles, Deep Purple, Scorpions, UFO, Van Halen, Led Zeppelin, the Sex Pistols, and Wishbone Ash. The guitarists that influenced him when he started playing were Eric Clapton, Jimi Hendrix, Ritchie Blackmore, Uli Jon Roth, and Eddie Van Halen.

Weikath is one of the founding members of Helloween, along with Kai Hansen (vocals/guitar), Markus Grosskopf (bass), and Ingo Schwichtenberg (drums). He had been one of only two original members still active in the band, the other being Markus Grosskopf, until Kai Hansen and Michael Kiske rejoined in 2016. Weikath integrated the first Helloween line up in 1982. By 1984, the band had signed a deal with Noise Records and recorded two songs for a Noise compilation record called Death Metal. On that album, he was responsible for the song "Oernst of Life."

In a 1998 interview with Weikath, Chaotic Critiques webzine pointed out the occasional spiritual themes and uplifting melodies on songs such as "Hey Lord!" and asked if the band was somewhat spiritual. Weikath replied that all the band, except Uli Kusch, were Christian. Weikath stated that he himself is Catholic. Today, he resides in Puerto de la Cruz, Tenerife, Canary Islands, Spain.

== Discography ==
- Helloween (1985)
- Walls of Jericho (1985)
- Keeper of the Seven Keys: Part I (1987)
- Keeper of the Seven Keys: Part II (1988)
- Pink Bubbles Go Ape (1991)
- Chameleon (1993)
- Master of the Rings (1994)
- The Time of the Oath (1996)
- Better Than Raw (1998)
- Metal Jukebox (1999)
- The Dark Ride (2000)
- Rabbit Don't Come Easy (2003)
- Keeper of the Seven Keys: The Legacy (2005)
- Gambling with the Devil (2007)
- Unarmed – Best of 25th Anniversary (2009)
- 7 Sinners (2010)
- Straight Out of Hell (2013)
- My God-Given Right (2015)
- Helloween (2021)
- Live at Budokan (2024)
- Giants & Monsters (2025)

== Equipment ==
- Div and 1973 Marshall amplifier (50-watt)
- Div and 1982 Marshall amplifier (100-watt)
- Div ENGL amplifiers
- DigiTech GSP1101 Guitar Multi Effects Processor
- Vox AC30 Orange Overdrive amplifier
- 1990 Gibson Les Paul black
- 1990 Gibson Les Paul white
- 1990 Gibson Flying V white
- 2012 Gibson Flying V custom
- 2015 Gibson Les Paul Standard trans blue
- 2016 Gibson Flying V T soaring rock tones
- 2018 Epiphone Limited Edition Flying V Custom
- Gibson Explorer custom black/white
- 1976 Gibson L6-S
- 1974/75/79 Fender Stratocasters
- Gibson Les Paul Goldtop

Like fellow Helloween guitarist Sascha Gerstner, Weikath is using a DigiTech GSP1101 preamp with a Marshall JVM410H amplifier for live performances.
