= Sascha Gerstner =

German guitarist

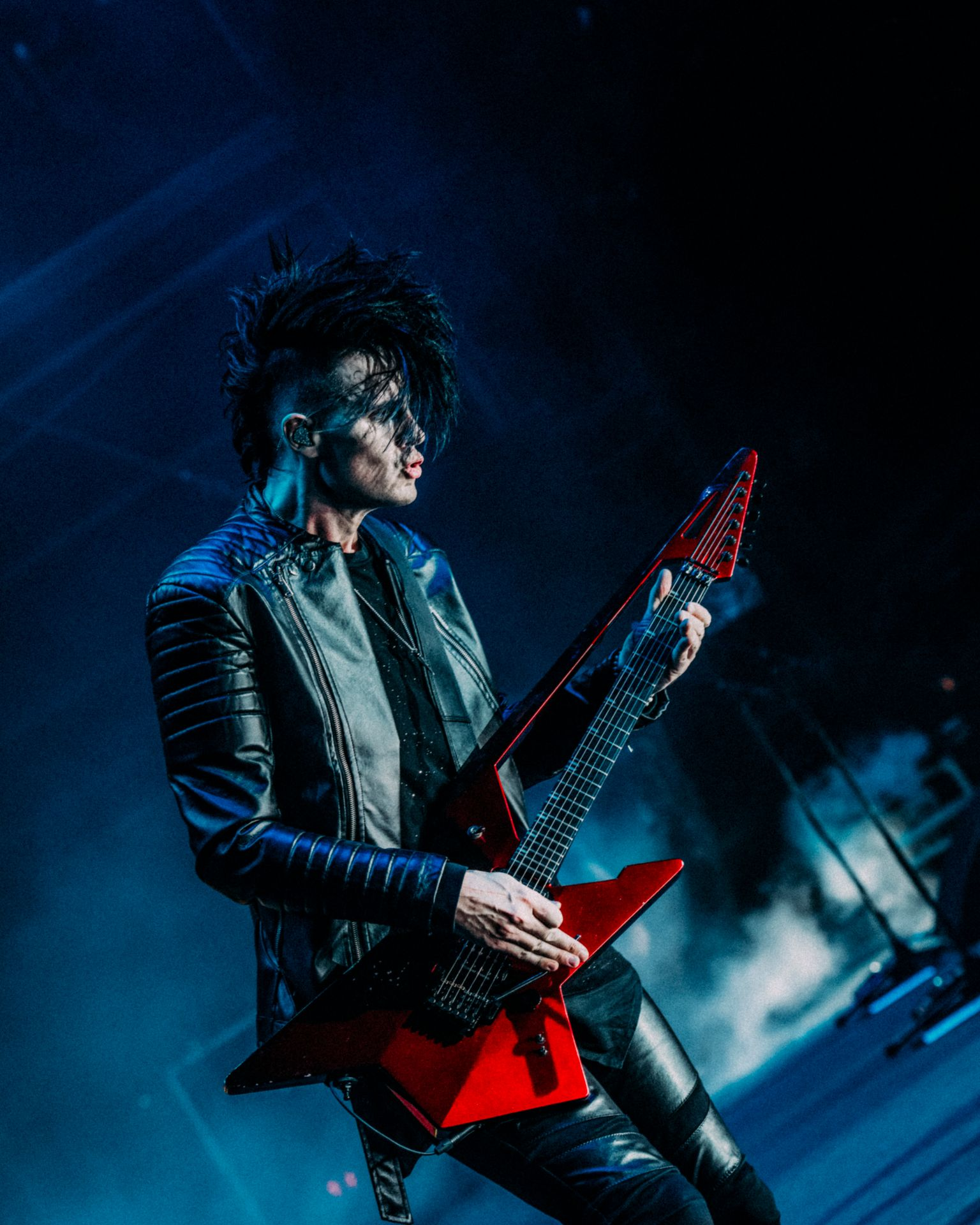
- Gerstner in 2023

Background information
- Born: 2 April 1977 (age 48); Stuttgart, West Germany
- Genres: Power metal, speed metal, heavy metal
- Occupations: Guitarist

Sascha Gerstner (born 2 April 1977) is a German musician who has been one of the guitarists and backing vocalists of power metal band Helloween since 2002. He is also a former member of Freedom Call.

== Biography ==
Starting as a keyboard player at age 6, Gerstner explored the 80s new wave and pop scenes. At 13, he shifted to the guitar, influenced by Michael Schenker Group and Steve Lukather.

In 1998, he joined the metal band Freedom Call, contributing to their first two albums and touring extensively. In 2002, he connected with Michael Weikath of Helloween.

Since then, Gerstner has been a guitarist and songwriter for Helloween, recording seven studio albums and earning commercial success. His guitar skills earned recognition in the power metal scene.

Beyond Helloween, Gerstner started the electronic rock solo project PALAST in 2015. He's also involved in Berlin's fashion and photography scenes, leaving his mark with a distinct artistic vision.

Gerstner endorses Dean Guitars and Blackstar Amplifiers.

== Discography ==
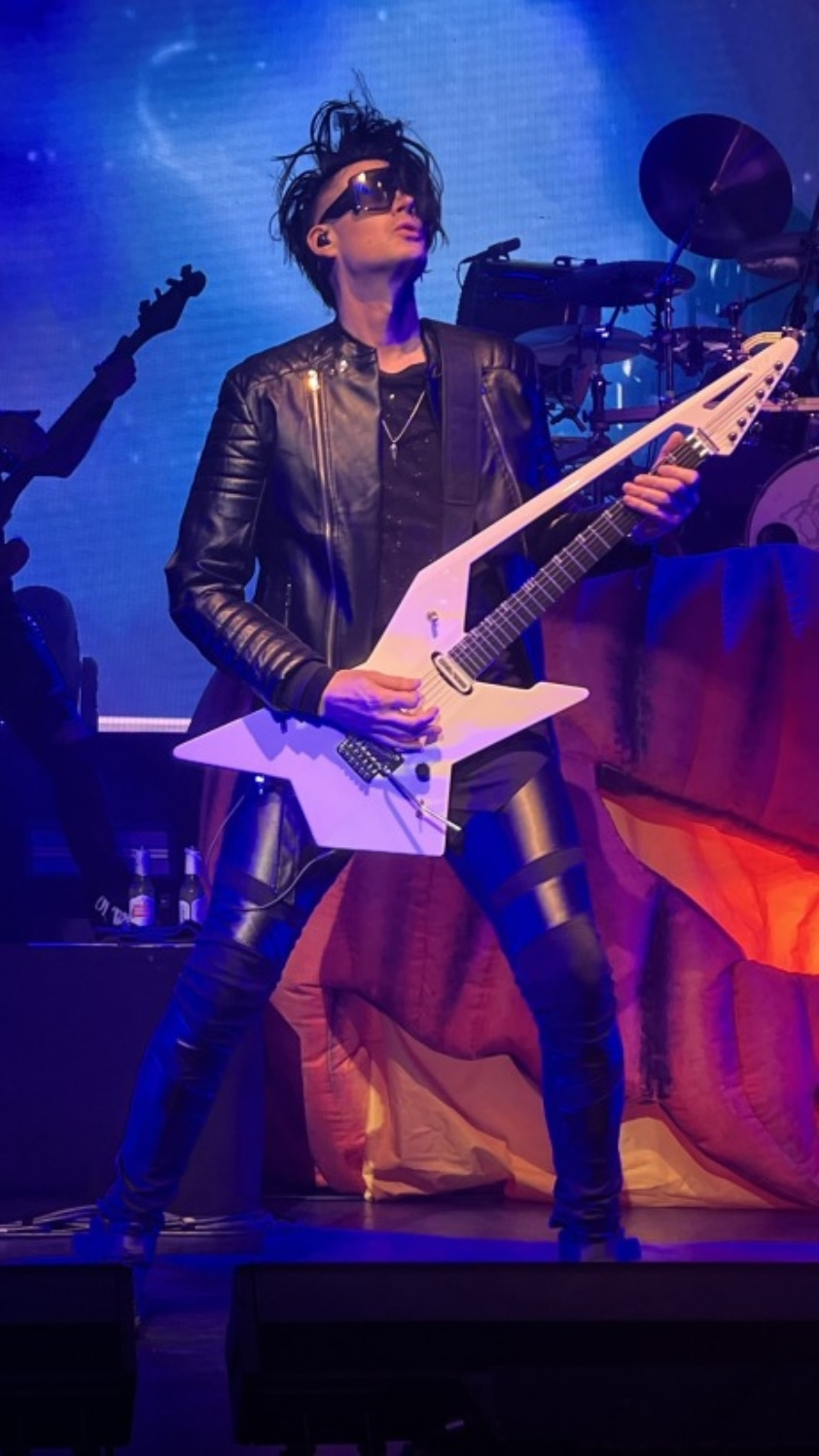
Gerstner in 2023

=== Freedom Call ===
- Stairway to Fairyland (1999)
- Taragon – EP (1999)
- Crystal Empire (2001)

=== Helloween ===
- Rabbit Don't Come Easy (2003)
- Keeper of the Seven Keys: The Legacy (2005)
- Keeper of the Seven Keys – The Legacy World Tour 2005/2006
- Gambling with the Devil (2007)
- Unarmed – Best of 25th Anniversary (2009)
- 7 Sinners (2010)
- Straight Out of Hell (2013)
- My God-Given Right (2015)
- Helloween (2021)
- Live at Budokan (2024)
- Giants & Monsters (2025)

=== Palast ===
- Hush – EP (2016)
- Palast (album) (2017)

Preceded by Roland Grapow	Helloween guitarist 2002 – present	Incumbent
