= The Dark Ride =

Studio album by Helloween
- Released: 30 October 2000
- Recorded: 2000
- Studios: Mi Sueño Studio, Tenerife, Spain
- Genre: Power metal
- Length: 52:41
- Label: Nuclear Blast
- Producers: Roy Z and Charlie Bauerfeind

Helloween chronology
Metal Jukebox (1999)	The Dark Ride (2000)	Rabbit Don't Come Easy (2003)

Singles from The Dark Ride
- 1. "Mr. Torture" Released: October 2000; 2. "If I Could Fly" Released: October 2000

Professional ratings
Review scores
Source	Rating
AllMusic	4/5 stars
Sputnikmusic	4/5 stars

The Dark Ride is the ninth studio album by German power metal band Helloween, released in 2000. The album's style was quite different from Better Than Raw as it had a much darker sound, drop-tuned guitars, and gruffer vocals. The album was produced by Roy Z and Charlie Bauerfeind. It is the last studio album to feature Master of the Rings-era lineup with the dismissal of guitarist Roland Grapow and drummer Uli Kusch after completion of the supporting tour for the album. They went on to form the band Masterplan.

The album contains two singles, which are "If I Could Fly" and "Mr. Torture".

In later interviews, bassist Markus Grosskopf commented on the album, saying: "The Dark Ride was kind of constructed, all the people were telling us try this, let's do this, you know, it's a good album but it's a very difficult way to do records when there's somebody always going on your nerves all the time", and that the album "sounded like it did because certain people wanted us to work with other certain people. We let people come in and mess with the arrangements, and re-work the lyrics, and generally do just what they wanted. They wanted us to work like that, and we agreed. If they wanted us to do it that way, then we were willing to give it a try and see what happened with it."

== Track listing ==
No.	Title	Writer(s)	Length
1.	"Beyond the Portal"	Andi Deris	0:45
2.	"Mr. Torture"	Uli Kusch	3:27
3.	"All Over the Nation"	Michael Weikath	4:55
4.	"Escalation 666"	Roland Grapow	4:24
5.	"Mirror, Mirror"	Deris	3:43
6.	"If I Could Fly"	Deris	4:09
7.	"Salvation"	Weikath	5:43
8.	"The Departed (Sun Is Going Down)"	Kusch	4:37
9.	"I Live for Your Pain"	Deris	3:59
10.	"We Damn the Night"	Deris	4:07
11.	"Immortal"	Deris	4:04
12.	"The Dark Ride"	Grapow	8:48
Total length:			52:41

Bonus tracks: Japanese edition
No.	Title	Writer(s)	Length
13.	"The Madness of the Crowds"	Deris	4:12

Bonus tracks: special edition
No.	Title	Writer(s)	Length
13.	"The Madness of the Crowds"	Deris	4:12
14.	"Deliver Us from Temptation"	Markus Grosskopf, Weikath	4:54
15.	"If I Could Fly (Single Edit)"	Deris	3:30

On some copies of "The Dark Ride" and "Rabbit Don't Come Easy" (as a special two for the price of one cd) the disc has "Mr. Torture" and "All Over the Nations" in reverse order so this way the latter is track #2. The tracks are also flipped on the Japanese version of the CD. Also on copies of the special two for one cd, there is a listing for track #13, "Far Away" on Rabbit Don't Come Easy, which does not exist on the CD and is a misprint on the back label.

== Personnel ==
- Andi Deris – vocals
- Michael Weikath – guitar
- Roland Grapow – guitar
- Markus Grosskopf – bass
- Uli Kusch – drums

== Charts ==
Chart (2000)	Peak position
Finnish Albums (Suomen virallinen lista)	19
German Albums (Offizielle Top 100)	26
Italian Albums (Musica e Dischi)	43
Japanese Albums (Oricon)	11
Swedish Albums (Sverigetopplistan)	38
Swiss Albums (Schweizer Hitparade)	68
