= Gambling with the Devil =

Studio album by Helloween
- Released: 24 October 2007
- Recorded: 2007 at Mi Sueño Studio, Tenerife, Spain
- Genre: Power metal
- Length: 57:32
- Label: SPV/Steamhammer
- Producer: Charlie Bauerfeind

Helloween chronology
Keeper of the Seven Keys - The Legacy World Tour 2005/2006 (2007)	Gambling with the Devil (2007)	Unarmed – Best of 25th Anniversary (2009)

Singles from Gambling with the Devil
- 1. "As Long as I Fall" Released: 28 September 2007

Gambling with the Devil is the twelfth studio album by German power metal band Helloween, released in Japan on 24 October 2007, and in Europe on 26 October. The single "As Long as I Fall" is download-only and was released in late September. Biff Byford made an appearance, with spoken vocals on "Crack the Riddle".

When asked about the album, bassist Markus Grosskopf commented:

It was an album without any concept, but still we had that concept with that little game on it, that little "Crack the Riddle". [...] And then, that was nice, it was a great piece of work and when you do such an output like Keeper III it's like you've got to open your head and empty it at first, close it and then start thinking new for Keeper thing you know, but then it's very, very hard work. You've got to think very different from what you do when you just write the songs so to say, just like writing a normal metal song or rock song, it's very different. But that's what we did with the Gambling with the Devil and I feel very good just doing proper decent songs. You cannot do always like this concept thing. [...] It's never easy, but once you got an idea you don't have to think about "Oh, that's five minutes missing" you know. What do I put in to make it fit for the concept? Fit it to make it fit in the concept of something, it's just like if there's a song of five minutes or four minutes and it's cool, you don't have to think about how is it fitting in the concept, if the song's good the song's good, it goes on the record.

== Track listing ==
No.	Title	Writer(s)	Length
1.	"Crack the Riddle (intro)"	Lyrics: Andi Deris / Music: Deris, Michael Weikath, Sascha Gerstner, Dani Löble, Markus Grosskopf	0:56
2.	"Kill It"	Deris	4:13
3.	"The Saints"	Weikath	7:06
4.	"As Long as I Fall"	Deris	3:41
5.	"Paint a New World"	Lyrics: Gerstner, Weikath / Music: Gerstner	4:27
6.	"Final Fortune"	Grosskopf	4:46
7.	"The Bells of the 7 Hells"	Deris	5:22
8.	"Fallen to Pieces"	Deris	5:52
9.	"I.M.E."	Deris	3:46
10.	"Can Do It"	Weikath	4:30
11.	"Dreambound"	Lyrics: Gerstner, Weikath / Music: Gerstner	5:57
12.	"Heaven Tells No Lies"	Grosskopf	6:56
Total length:			57:32

Bonus track
No.	Title	Writer(s)	Length
1.	"We Unite" (Japanese bonus track)	Grosskopf	4:34

Disc 2 (special edition only)
No.	Title	Writer(s)	Length
1.	"Find My Freedom" (European version)	Grosskopf	6:30
2.	"See the Night"	Grosskopf	6:04
3.	"Never Surrender'" (USA Tour special edition)	Gerstner	4:50
4.	"As Long As I Fall (Radio Edit)" (Japanese version)	Deris	3:45
5.	"As Long as I Fall (Enhanced Video)"
6.	"Trailer" (Enhanced)"

== Critical reception ==
Professional ratings
Review scores
Source	Rating
AllMusic	2/5 stars
Sputnikmusic	3.5/5 stars
About.com	4/5 stars

The album has received mostly positive reviews, with critics hailing it as one of the band's strongest efforts in quite a while. Andi Deris' vocals on the album also got praise for their power, range and emotion.

== Personnel ==
Band members

- Andi Deris – lead vocals
- Michael Weikath – guitar
- Sascha Gerstner – guitar, backing vocals
- Markus Grosskopf – bass
- Dani Löble – drums

Guests

- Biff Byford – spoken vocals on "Crack the Riddle"
- Matthias Ulmer – keyboards

== Charts ==
Chart (2007)	Peak position
Czech Republic Albums Chart	10
Finnish Albums (Suomen virallinen lista)	34
French Albums (SNEP)	103
German Albums (Offizielle Top 100)	38
Hungarian Albums (MAHASZ)	18
Italian Albums (FIMI)	49
Japanese Albums (Oricon)	17
Swedish Albums (Sverigetopplistan)	34
Swiss Albums (Schweizer Hitparade)	88
UK Rock & Metal Albums (OCC)	18
