= Rabbit Don't Come Easy =

Studio album by Helloween
- Released: 12 May 2003
- Studios: Mi Sueño Recording Studios, Tenerife, Spain
- Genre: Power metal
- Length: 61:00
- Label: Nuclear Blast
- Producer: Charlie Bauerfeind

Helloween chronology
The Dark Ride (2000)	Rabbit Don't Come Easy (2003)	Keeper of the Seven Keys: The Legacy (2005)

Singles from Rabbit Don't Come Easy
- 1. "Just a Little Sign" Released: 7 April 2003

Professional ratings
Review scores
Source	Rating
AllMusic	4/5 stars
Sputnikmusic	3.5/5 stars

Rabbit Don't Come Easy is the tenth studio album by German power metal band Helloween, released in 2003. It is the first Helloween album to feature Sascha Gerstner on guitars, who replaced Roland Grapow. No drummer is listed in the band line-up for this album. Mark Cross was hired for the position before recording, but only managed to complete two tracks ("Don't Stop Being Crazy" and "Listen to the Flies") before being forced to leave due to illness. Mikkey Dee of Motörhead played on the rest of the songs on a session basis. The Japanese version contains a cover of Accept's "Fast as a Shark", with the band's new drummer, Stefan Schwarzmann.

Commenting on Dee's performance, bassist Markus Grosskopf said:

"We really challenged him. Last time he played stuff something like that was when he played in King Diamond in the 80's and this type of double bass playing with that kind of stuff we're doing is not just like very easy to play and he had to recall all this stuff. But then he was, once he tried a little then he was back on the track really fast."

About the album title, bassist Markus Grosskopf explained in 2003 that "It's based on that English saying, pulling a rabbit out of the hat. Pulling this rabbit [the album] out of this hat [in reference to recent line up changes] wasn't that easy this time. That gave us the idea of just calling the album Rabbit Don't Come Easy. [Laughs] It's not to be taken too seriously. We were joking that statement around, and then I suggested we actually call the album that".

About the recording of the album, singer Andi Deris said in 2003 that producer Charlie Bauerfeind "shows on this new record that he is the biggest fan of our genre of music because he knows how to separate the frequencies and knows where the power has to be. You have to imagine that this type of music is so packed with frequencies that it is nearly impossible to mix because it is so overloaded and you have to single out all of the instruments so you can hear them all".

After the controversial release of The Dark Ride, according to Grosskopf, "The record company also wanted us to show that we are back. This song "Just a Little Sign" represents the more typical side of Helloween, and that's what we wanted to make clear. You can't really represent a whole album with one track, but this shows exactly where the album actually goes. It's more of that 'happy happy Helloween' direction. It shows that this album is not a sequel to 'The Dark Ride'".

== Track listing ==
All lyrics written by Andi Deris, except where noted.

No.	Title	Lyrics	Music	Length
1.	"Just a Little Sign"		Deris	4:25
2.	"Open Your Life"		Deris, Sascha Gerstner	4:30
3.	"The Tune"	Michael Weikath	Weikath	5:35
4.	"Never Be a Star"		Deris	4:10
5.	"Liar"		Deris, Gerstner, Markus Grosskopf	4:55
6.	"Sun 4 the World"		Gerstner	3:57
7.	"Don't Stop Being Crazy"		Deris	4:21
8.	"Do You Feel Good"	Weikath	Weikath	4:22
9.	"Hell Was Made in Heaven"		Grosskopf	5:33
10.	"Back Against the Wall"		Deris, Weikath	5:44
11.	"Listen to the Flies"		Deris, Gerstner	4:54
12.	"Nothing to Say"	Weikath	Weikath	8:29
Total length:				60:55

Bonus tracks
No.	Title	Writer(s)	Length
1.	"Far Away" (Limited edition bonus track)	Grosskopf	4:18
2.	"Fast as a Shark" (Japanese bonus track; Accept cover)	Wolf Hoffmann, Stefan Kaufmann, Udo Dirkschneider, Peter Baltes	3:38
3.	"Sheer Heart Attack" (Queen cover)	Roger Taylor	3:31

== Personnel ==
Helloween

- Andi Deris - vocals
- Michael Weikath - guitar
- Sascha Gerstner - guitar
- Markus Grosskopf - bass

Additional musicians

- Mark Cross - drums on tracks 7, 11
- Mikkey Dee - drums on tracks 1–6, 8–10, 12
- Stefan Schwarzmann - drums on tracks 13–15 (bonus tracks)

== Charts ==
Chart (2003)	Peak position
Finnish Albums (Suomen virallinen lista)	23
French Albums (SNEP)	119
German Albums (Offizielle Top 100)	26
Hungarian Albums (MAHASZ)	31
Italian Albums (FIMI)	73
Japanese Albums (Oricon)	11
Swedish Albums (Sverigetopplistan)	12
Swiss Albums (Schweizer Hitparade)	93
