= Metal Jukebox =

Studio album by Helloween
- Released: 9 November 1999
- Recorded: 1999
- Studio: Fixitinthemix and Crazy Cat Studio in Hamburg, Germany and Mi Sueno Studio in Tenerife, Spain
- Genre: Heavy metal
- Length: 51:54
- Label: Castle Communications
- Producer: Helloween

Helloween chronology
| Better Than Raw (1998) | Metal Jukebox (1999) | The Dark Ride (2000) |

Singles from Metal Jukebox
- 1. "Lay All Your Love On Me" Released: 25 August 1999

Professional ratings
Review scores
| Source | Rating |
|---|---|
| Allmusic | 3/5 stars |

Metal Jukebox is a cover album by German power metal band Helloween. The song "Lay All Your Love on Me" was released as a single in Japan. Each member of the band recorded their instruments independently (and in different countries and studios) of each other and was later brought together at Andi Deris' Tenerife studio.

== Track listing ==
| No. | Title | Writer(s) | Length |
|---|---|---|---|
| 1. | "He's a Woman - She's a Man" (Scorpions cover) | Klaus Meine, Herman Rarebell, Rudolf Schenker | 3:13 |
| 2. | "Locomotive Breath" (Jethro Tull cover) | Ian Anderson | 3:56 |
| 3. | "Lay All Your Love on Me" (ABBA cover) | Benny Andersson, Björn Ulvaeus | 4:36 |
| 4. | "Space Oddity" (David Bowie cover) | David Bowie | 4:51 |
| 5. | "From Out of Nowhere" (Faith No More cover) | Roddy Bottum, Billy Gould, Mike Patton | 3:19 |
| 6. | "All My Loving" (The Beatles cover) | John Lennon, Paul McCartney | 1:44 |
| 7. | "Hocus Pocus" (Focus cover) | Jan Akkerman, Thijs van Leer | 6:43 |
| 8. | "Faith Healer" (The Sensational Alex Harvey Band cover) | Alex Harvey, Ted McKenna | 7:08 |
| 9. | "Juggernaut" (Frank Marino cover) | Frank Marino | 4:50 |
| 10. | "White Room" (Cream cover) | Pete Brown, Jack Bruce | 5:46 |
| 11. | "Mexican" (Babe Ruth cover) | Alan Shacklock | 5:48 |
| Total length: | | | 51:54 |

Japanese release only
| No. | Title | Writer(s) | Length |
|---|---|---|---|
| 12. | "Rat Bat Blue" (Deep Purple cover) | Ritchie Blackmore, Ian Gillan, Roger Glover, Jon Lord, Ian Paice | 5:30 |

== Personnel ==
- Andi Deris - vocals
- Michael Weikath - guitar
- Roland Grapow - guitar
- Markus Grosskopf - bass
- Uli Kusch - drums

== Charts ==
| Chart (1999) | Peak position |
|---|---|
| Finnish Albums (Suomen virallinen lista) | 31 |
| German Albums (Offizielle Top 100) | 49 |
| Japanese Albums (Oricon) | 28 |
| Swedish Albums (Sverigetopplistan) | 51 |
| UK Rock & Metal Albums (OCC) | 40 |
