= Better Than Raw =

Studio album by Helloween
- Released: 4 March 1998
- Recorded: 1997
- Studio: Chateau du Pape and Crazy Cat Studios, Hamburg, Germany and Mi Sueño Studio, Tenerife, Spain
- Genre: Power metal
- Length: 54:46
- Label: Castle Communications
- Producer: Tommy Hansen, Helloween

Helloween chronology
High Live (1996)	Better Than Raw (1998)	Metal Jukebox (1999)

Singles from Better Than Raw
- 1. "I Can" Released: April 1998; 2. "Hey Lord!" Released: April 1998

Professional ratings
Review scores
Source	Rating
AllMusic	4/5 stars

Better Than Raw is the eighth studio album by German power metal band Helloween, released in 1998. The album spawned the singles "I Can" and "Hey Lord!".

The album was recorded at Chateau du Pape and Crazy Cat Studios in Hamburg and at Mi Sueño Studio in Tenerife. It was produced and mixed by Tommy Hansen at Chateau du Pape and mastered by Ian Cooper at Metropolis, London.

== Track listing ==
No.	Title	Lyrics	Music	Length
1.	"Deliberately Limited Preliminary Prelude Period in Z"	instrumental	Uli Kusch	1:45
2.	"Push"	Andi Deris, Kusch, Michael Weikath	Kusch	4:45
3.	"Falling Higher"	Deris, Weikath	Weikath	4:45
4.	"Hey Lord!"	Deris	Deris	4:07
5.	"Don't Spit on My Mind"	Deris	Deris, Markus Grosskopf	4:24
6.	"Revelation"	Deris	Kusch	8:21
7.	"Time"	Deris	Deris	5:43
8.	"I Can"	Weikath	Deris, Weikath	4:38
9.	"A Handful of Pain"	Deris	Kusch	4:49
10.	"Lavdate Dominvm"	Weikath	Weikath	5:10
11.	"Midnight Sun"	Weikath	Weikath	6:19
Total length:				54:46

Expanded Edition bonus tracks
No.	Title	Lyrics	Music	Length
1.	"Back on the Ground"	Deris	Kusch	4:40
2.	"A Game We Shouldn't Play"	Deris	Deris	3:38
3.	"Perfect Gentleman" (live bootleg version)	Deris, Weikath	Deris	3:27
4.	"Moshi Moshi~Shiki No Uta" (live drum solo & original song)	instrumental	Moshi~Moshi: Kusch, Roland Grapow, Shiki no Uta: T. Araki	6:53

- M - 2 also appears on the "I Can" single.
- M - 3,4 also appears on the "Hey Lord!" single.

== Personnel ==
=== Helloween ===
- Andi Deris – lead and backing vocals
- Michael Weikath – guitar, backing vocals
- Roland Grapow – guitar, backing vocals
- Markus Grosskopf – bass, backing vocals
- Uli Kusch – drums

=== Others ===
- Jorn Ellerbrock – keyboards
- Tommy Hansen (producer) – keyboards
- Jutta Weinhold, Ralf Maurer, Christina Hahne – backing vocals

== Trivia ==
- Hanson have been known to use the album introduction as an entrance to their concerts.
- "Lavdate Dominvm" (read as Laudate Dominum, Classical Latin for "Praise the Lord") was written as a tribute for the band's dedicated fans in Spain, South America, and other Catholic and Christian countries and regions.
- "Midnight Sun" is about the ending of a bad relationship.
- The cover was inspired by The Smurfs, with Gargamel changed for the witch and the Smurfs for pumpkins.
- As opposed to the more benign-looking pumpkin used on previous albums, a sinister-looking pumpkin is used to represent the "o" in the "Helloween" logo. Albeit with a few minor tweaks, it was in use up until the 2021 album Helloween.

== Charts ==
Chart (1998)	Peak position
Austrian Albums (Ö3 Austria)	36
Finnish Albums (Suomen virallinen lista)	7
German Albums (Offizielle Top 100)	19
Japanese Albums (Oricon)	9
Swedish Albums (Sverigetopplistan)	35
Swiss Albums (Schweizer Hitparade)	42
UK Independent Albums (OCC)	21
UK Rock & Metal Albums (OCC)	14

== Certifications ==
Region	Certification	Certified units/sales
Japan (RIAJ)	Gold	100,000^{^}
^{^} Shipments figures based on certification alone.
