= Keeper of the Seven Keys: The Legacy =

Studio album by Helloween
- Released: 28 October 2005
- Recorded: December 2004 – June 2005 at Mi Sueño Studio, Tenerife, Spain; House Of Music Studios, Winterbach, Germany; Cove Studios, U.S.
- Genre: Power metal
- Length: 77:26
- Label: Steamhammer
- Producer: Charlie Bauerfeind

Helloween chronology
Rabbit Don't Come Easy (2003)	Keeper of the Seven Keys: The Legacy (2005)	Keeper of the Seven Keys – The Legacy World Tour 2005/2006 (2007)

Singles from Keeper of the Seven Keys: The Legacy
- 1. "Mrs. God" Released: 5 September 2005; 2. "Light the Universe" Released: 7 November 2006

Professional ratings
Review scores
Source	Rating
AllMusic	3.5/5 stars

Keeper of the Seven Keys: The Legacy is the eleventh studio album by German power metal band Helloween, released in 2005. It is the first album with new and current drummer Dani Löble and a continuation of their 1987 and 1988 albums Keeper of the Seven Keys, Parts I and II. The album is a double CD with nearly 80 minutes playing time and comes in a digipack with 6 flaps. It was produced by Charlie Bauerfeind (Blind Guardian, Halford, Rage) and features Blackmore's Night singer Candice Night on the track "Light The Universe". The album's opening track, “The King for a 1000 Years” is, to date, the longest song released by the band.

When asked about what inspired them to make a third Keeper album, bassist Markus Grosskopf said:

Actually there was somebody from the Japanese record company who told Weiki [Michael Weikath, guitarist] how happy he is with the new line up. He said something like 'That line up is really strong, with that line up you can make A KEEPER album' just to say how strong that line up is, that's the explanation. And the record company started thinking 'Why don't you do so?'. [...] then we thought 'Well, why don't we try it with that line up?' But then we decided to do it very different and not to copy, the actual thing was not to copy that old stuff, the good old stuff, but doing something new. [...] And it deserves the name, even if some people think it doesn't.

The intro of the song "Occasion Avenue" uses samples from "Halloween", "Eagle Fly Free" and "Keeper of the Seven Keys" with Michael Kiske on vocals. One of the samples is a clip from a previously unreleased live version of "Keys" with Kiske singing the first part of the chorus and the crowd joining in.

== Track listing ==
=== Disc one ===
No.	Title	Lyrics	Music	Length
1.	"The King for a 1000 Years"	Andi Deris	Deris • Michael Weikath • Sascha Gerstner • Markus Grosskopf • Dani Löble	13:54
2.	"The Invisible Man"	Gerstner	Gerstner	7:17
3.	"Born on Judgment Day"	Weikath	Weikath	6:14
4.	"Pleasure Drone"	Gerstner	Gerstner	4:08
5.	"Mrs. God"	Deris	Deris	2:55
6.	"Silent Rain"	Deris	Gerstner	4:21

=== Disc two ===
All tracks are written by Deris, except where noted.

No.	Title	Lyrics	Music	Length
1.	"Occasion Avenue"			11:04
2.	"Light the Universe" (feat. Candice Night)			5:00
3.	"Do You Know What You Are Fighting For"	Weikath	Weikath	4:45
4.	"Come Alive"			3:20
5.	"The Shade in the Shadow"			3:24
6.	"Get It Up"	Weikath	Weikath	4:13
7.	"My Life for One More Day"		Grosskopf	6:51

Bonus track
No.	Title	Lyrics	Music	Length
8.	"Revolution" (Korean and Japanese bonus track)	Grosskopf	Grosskopf	5:06

== Personnel ==
- Andi Deris – vocals, additional keyboards
- Michael Weikath – guitar
- Sascha Gerstner – guitar, additional keyboards
- Markus Grosskopf – bass
- Dani Löble – drums

Guest musicians

- Friedel Amon – keyboards
- Backing vocals by Oliver Hartmann and Olaf Senkbeil
- Candice Night – guest vocal on "Light the Universe"
- Michael Kiske – cameo vocals on "Occasion Avenue"

Production

- Produced by Charlie Bauerfeind
- Recorded, engineered, mixed & mastered by Charlie Bauerfeind at Mi Sueno Studio in Tenerife, Spain
- Backing vocals recorded by Charlie Bauerfeind at House of Music Studios in Winterbach, Germany
- Vocals of Candice Night recorded at Cove Studios by Pat Regan
- Design and cover artwork by Martin Häusler
- Photography by Mathias Bothor

== Charts ==
Chart (2005)	Peak position
Finnish Albums (Suomen virallinen lista)	28
French Albums (SNEP)	89
German Albums (Offizielle Top 100)	28
Italian Albums (FIMI)	37
Japanese Albums (Oricon)	22
Spanish Albums (PROMUSICAE)	59
Swedish Albums (Sverigetopplistan)	24
Swiss Albums (Schweizer Hitparade)	61
