= The Time of the Oath =

Studio album by Helloween
- Released: 29 February 1996 (Japan); 5 March 1996 (USA); 11 March 1996 (UK)
- Recorded: 1995 at Chateau du Pape, Hamburg, Germany
- Genre: Power metal
- Length: 61:29 (w/o bonus tracks); 91:45 (w/ bonus tracks)
- Labels: Victor Entertainment; Castle Communications; Raw Power
- Producer: Tommy Hansen

Helloween chronology
Master of the Rings (1994)	The Time of the Oath (1996)	High Live (1996)

Singles from The Time of the Oath
- 1. "Power" Released: 16 January 1996; 2. "The Time of the Oath" Released: 2 May 1996; 3. "Forever and One (Neverland)" Released: 4 September 1996

Professional ratings
Review scores
Source	Rating
Allmusic	3/5 stars

The Time of the Oath is the seventh studio album by German power metal band Helloween, released in 1996.

== Album description ==
The Time of the Oath is a concept album. According to Andi Deris, it is based on the prophecies of Nostradamus, referring to the prophecies made for the years 1994 to 2000. Nostradamus' interpreters believe that he predicted a third World War followed by a millennium of peace if humans made the right choices. The album is meant to reflect the choices of humanity. The Keeper that appears on this album, having returned from the first two Keeper of the Seven Keys albums and later to return on the third, could represent God, or the stupidity of humanity in the form of the seventh trooper in the song "Before the War." Instead of a space scene as on the cover of Keeper of the Seven Keys: Part I, the area under the Keeper's hood is filled with stars and a line of golden rings, in the fashion of Master of the Rings' artwork. The track "The Time of the Oath" reflects on Act V of Faust Part Two, written by Johann Wolfgang von Goethe. Andi Deris plays the part of Mephistopheles, reclaiming the soul of doctor Faust, whereas the Choir of the Orchestra "Johann Sebastian Bach", Hamburg, (conducted by Axel Bergstedt) sings the Dies irae from the traditional requiem, representing the angels rescuing Faust's lost soul.

The album contains three singles: "Power", "The Time of the Oath", and "Forever And One (Neverland)". The latter has a different track listing for the German release, which is titled "Forever And One Live". "Power" reached number 40 on the Japanese singles chart.

== Track listing ==
The Time of the Oath tracklist
No.	Title	Lyrics	Music	Length
1.	"We Burn"	Andi Deris	Deris	3:04
2.	"Steel Tormentor"	Deris	Michael Weikath	5:40
3.	"Wake Up the Mountain"	Deris	Uli Kusch	5:01
4.	"Power"	Weikath	Weikath	3:28
5.	"Forever and One (Neverland)"	Deris	Deris	3:54
6.	"Before the War"	Deris	Deris	4:33
7.	"A Million to One"	Deris, Kusch	Kusch	5:11
8.	"Anything My Mama Don't Like"	Deris	Deris, Kusch	3:46
9.	"Kings Will Be Kings"	Weikath	Weikath	5:09
10.	"Mission Motherland"	Weikath	Weikath, Helloween	9:00
11.	"If I Knew"	Weikath	Weikath	5:30
12.	"The Time of the Oath"	Deris	Roland Grapow	6:58
Total length:				61:29

Japanese version bonus tracks
No.	Title	Lyrics	Music	Length
13.	"Still I Don't Know"	Deris	Markus Grosskopf	4:13
14.	"Take It to the Limit"	Deris	Kusch	4:04

Expanded edition
No.	Title	Lyrics	Music	Length
1.	"Still I Don't Know"	Deris	Grosskopf	4:13
2.	"Take It to the Limit"	Deris	Kusch	4:04
3.	"Electric Eye" (Judas Priest Cover)	Glenn Tipton, Rob Halford, K. K. Downing	Tipton, Halford, Downing	4:06
4.	"Magnetic Fields" (Jean Michel Jarre cover)	Jarre	Jarre	3:41
5.	"Rain" (Status Quo cover)	Rick Parfitt	Parfitt	4:33
6.	"Walk Your Way"	Grosskopf	Grosskopf	4:56
7.	"Light in the Sky"	Deris	Deris	2:35
8.	"Time Goes By"	Deris	Deris	2:24

- M - 3,4 also appears on "The Time of the Oath" single.
- M - 5,6 also appears on the "Power" single.
- M - 7,8 also appears on the "Forever and One" single.

== Personnel ==
- Andi Deris - vocals
- Michael Weikath - guitar
- Roland Grapow - guitar
- Markus Grosskopf - bass
- Uli Kusch - drums

== Charts ==
Chart (1996)	Peak position
Austrian Albums (Ö3 Austria)	33
Finnish Albums (Suomen virallinen lista)	14
German Albums (Offizielle Top 100)	31
Japanese Albums (Oricon)	6
Swedish Albums (Sverigetopplistan)	26
Swiss Albums (Schweizer Hitparade)	30
UK Rock & Metal Albums (Official Charts)	28

== Certifications ==
Region	Certification	Certified units/sales
Japan (RIAJ)	Gold	100,000^{^}
^{^} Shipments figures based on certification alone.
