= Master of the Rings =

Studio album by Helloween
- Released: 26 August 1994 (Japan); 30 August 1994 (UK & Europe); 8 July 1995 (USA)
- Recorded: 1994
- Studio: Chateau du Pape, Hamburg, Germany
- Genre: Power metal
- Length: 50:12; 84:49 (with bonus tracks)
- Label: Victor Entertainment; Castle Communications/Raw Power; Castle Records
- Producer: Tommy Hansen and Helloween

Helloween chronology
Chameleon (1993)	Master of the Rings (1994)	The Time of the Oath (1996)

Singles from Master of the Rings
- 1. "Mr. Ego" Released: 22 July 1994; 2. "Where the Rain Grows" Released: 3 August 1994; 3. "Perfect Gentleman" Released: 28 September 1994; 4. "Sole Survivor" Released: 5 October 1995

Professional ratings
Review scores
Source	Rating
AllMusic	3/5 stars
Collector's Guide to Heavy Metal	8/10

Master of the Rings is the sixth studio album by German power metal band Helloween, released in 1994. It is the first to feature new members Andi Deris and Uli Kusch.

This album contains four singles, which are "Where the Rain Grows", "Mr. Ego (Take Me Down)", "Perfect Gentleman", and "Sole Survivor", with corresponding videos for the first three. "Mr. Ego" was dedicated to the band's former singer, Michael Kiske, and was released as an EP in Europe.

== Context and recording ==
Helloween and vocalist Michael Kiske had reached the end of the road during the touring of 1993's "Chameleon". Michael Kiske's replacement was Andi Deris, formerly with Pink Cream 69.

After an alcohol and drug-related incident in Japan, drummer and co-founder of the band Ingo Schwichtenberg was replaced first by the session-drummer Richie Abdel-Nabi, then on a more permanent basis by former Gamma Ray drummer Uli Kusch, who only arrived when most of the album was already written.

After two highly controversial studio projects and a live album, Helloween parted company with EMI records, aligning themselves with the more modestly sized Raw Power (an imprint of Castle Communications). Nevertheless, the effect of Deris and Kusch was to re-energize their collective fortunes. In Japan, "Master of The Rings" sold more than 120,000 copies.

Commenting on the recording sections for the album, bassist Markus Grosskopf said:

"It was very quick because there was a couple of songs Weiki [Michael Weikath, guitarist] did and Roland [Grapow, second guitarist] had a couple of stuff and then combined with the stuff Andi brought into the band you know it was very functioning and amazing because it went all so quick. We had like three months to rehearse and then the studio was booked and... That was a very quick session and I kind of liked that. There was also a drummer change because we got Uli Kusch in but we still did all that within like three months."

According to Roland Grapow's comments in the liner notes, the lyrics for "Take Me Home" were written by his wife Silvia. The song is simply credited to "Grapow" in the album.

== Track listing ==
No.	Title	Lyrics	Music	Length
1.	"Irritation (Weik Editude 112 in C)"	instrumental	Michael Weikath	1:14
2.	"Sole Survivor"	Andi Deris, Weikath	Weikath	4:33
3.	"Where the Rain Grows"	Deris	Weikath	4:47
4.	"Why?"	Deris	Deris	4:11
5.	"Mr. Ego (Take Me Down)"	Roland Grapow	Grapow	7:02
6.	"Perfect Gentleman"	Deris, Weikath	Deris	3:53
7.	"The Game Is On"	Weikath	Weikath	4:40
8.	"Secret Alibi"	Weikath	Weikath	5:49
9.	"Take Me Home"	Silvia Grapow	Grapow	4:25
10.	"In the Middle of a Heartbeat"	Deris, Weikath	Deris	4:30
11.	"Still We Go"	Grapow	Grapow	5:09
Total length:				50:12

Japanese edition bonus tracks
No.	Title	Lyrics	Music	Length
12.	"Can't Fight Your Desire"	Deris	Deris	3:45
13.	"Grapowski's Malmsuite 1001 (In D Doll)"	Grapow	Grapow	6:33

=== Expanded edition (disc 2) track listing ===
No.	Title	Writer(s)	Length
1.	"Can't Fight Your Desire"	Deris	3:45
2.	"Star Invasion"	Music: Weikath, Lyrics: Deris, Weikath	4:47
3.	"Cold Sweat" (Thin Lizzy cover)	Phil Lynott, John Sykes	3:46
4.	"Silicon Dreams"	Markus Grosskopf	4:10
5.	"Grapowski's Malmsuite 1001 (In D Doll)"	Grapow	6:33
6.	"I Stole Your Love" (Kiss cover)	Paul Stanley	3:23
7.	"Closer to Home" (Grand Funk Railroad cover)	Mark Farner	8:13

- M – 1 and 2 also appear on the "Mr. Ego" and "Where The Rain Grows" singles.
- M – 3, 4 and 5 also appear on the "Perfect Gentleman" single.
- M – 6 and 7 also appear on the "Sole Survivor" single.

== Personnel ==
=== Helloween ===
- Andi Deris – vocals
- Michael Weikath – guitar
- Roland Grapow – guitar, lead vocals on "Closer to Home"
- Markus Grosskopf – bass
- Uli Kusch – drums

=== Others ===
- George Chin – photography
- Ian Cooper – mastering
- Jorn Ellerbrock – programming
- Tommy Hansen – production, mixing, programming
- Michael Tibes – sound engineering

== Charts ==
Chart (1994)	Peak position
Austrian Albums (Ö3 Austria)	34
Finnish Albums (The Official Finnish Charts)	7
German Albums (Offizielle Top 100)	23
Japanese Albums (Oricon)	6
Swedish Albums (Sverigetopplistan)	26
Swiss Albums (Schweizer Hitparade)	22

== Certifications ==
Region	Certification	Certified units/sales
Japan (RIAJ)	Gold	100,000^{^}
^{^} Shipments figures based on certification alone.
