= Gamma Ray discography =

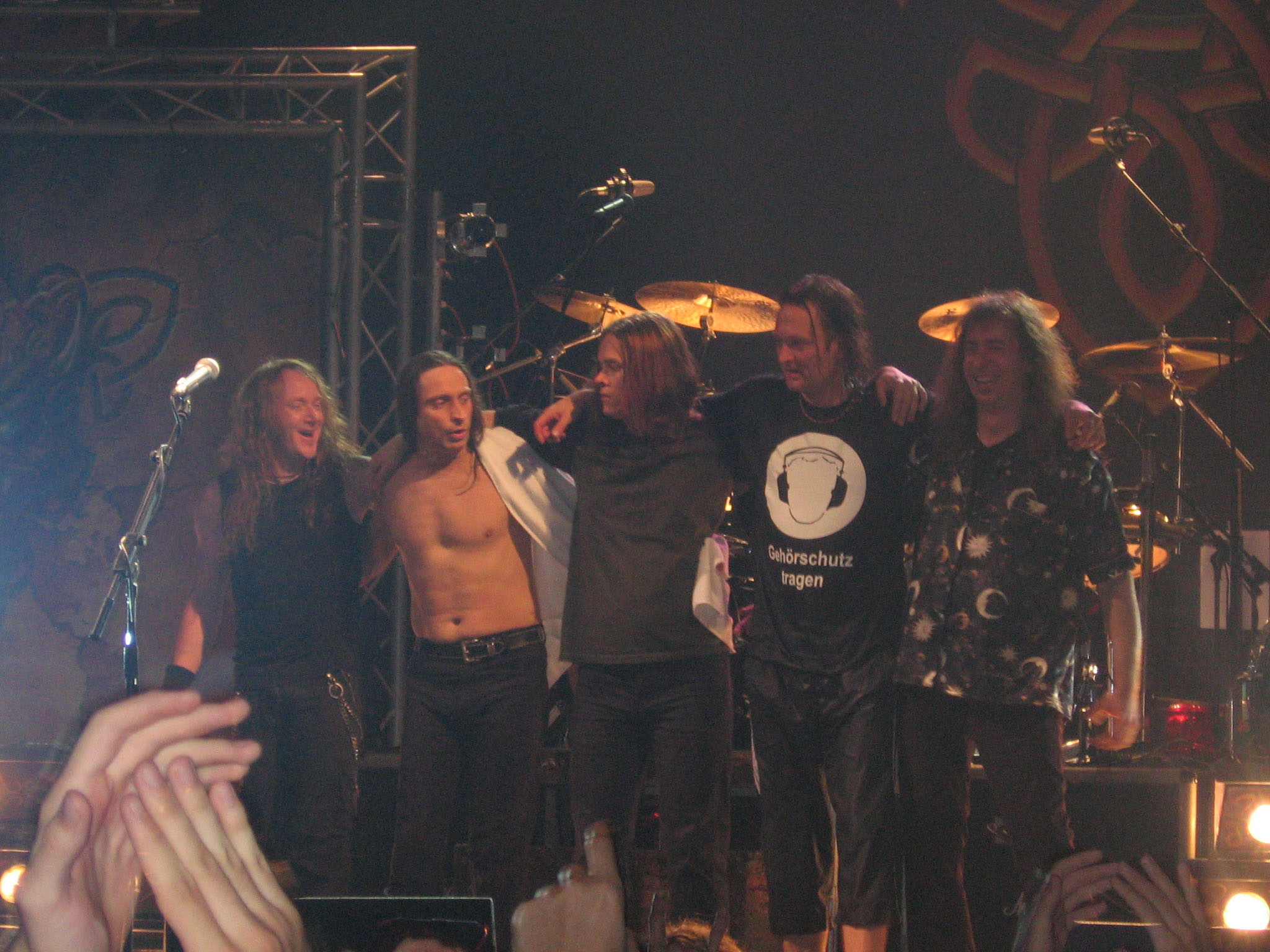
- Gamma Ray after a show in Spain, 2005
- Studio albums: 11
- Live albums: 4
- Compilation albums: 2
- Singles: 7
- Video albums: 3
- Music videos: 8

This is a discography of Gamma Ray, a German heavy metal band formed in Hamburg in 1988. They have released eleven studio albums, four live albums, two compilation albums, seven singles, and eight music videos.

== Albums ==
=== Studio albums ===
Year	Album details	Peak chart positions												
Year	Album details	AUT	BEL	CH	CRO	CZE	SPA	FIN	FRA	GER	GRE	ITA	JPN	SWE
1990	Heading for Tomorrow: Released: February 1990; Label: Noise Records	—	—	29	—	—	—	—	—	31	—	—	24	45
1991	Sigh No More: Released: September 1991; Label: Noise Records	—	—	—	—	—	—	—	—	—	—	—	12	—
1993	Insanity and Genius: Released: September 1993; Label: Noise Records	—	—	—	—	—	—	—	—	93	—	—	9	—
1995	Land of the Free: Released: May 1995; Label: Noise Records	—	—	—	—	—	—	—	—	70	—	—	17	—
1997	Somewhere Out in Space: Released: August 1997; Label: Noise Records	—	—	—	—	—	—	17	—	39	—	—	22	59
1999	Power Plant: Released: March 1999; Label: Sanctuary Records	45	—	—	—	—	—	32	—	25	—	—	31	51
2001	No World Order: Released: October 2001; Label: Sanctuary Records	—	—	—	—	—	—	19	70	23	—	55	13	27
2005	Majestic: Released: September 2005; Label: Sanctuary Records	—	—	—	—	33	—	28	169	39	—	66	37	20
2007	Land of the Free II: Released: November 2007; Label: SPV GmbH	—	—	—	—	—	—	—	194	54	—	—	30	57
2010	To the Metal!: Released: January 2010; Label: earMUSIC	—	94	55	4	17	78	31	96	24	2	59	31	25
2014	Empire of the Undead: Released: March 2014; Label: earMUSIC	46	71	21	—	5	—	12	89	13	—	—	52	26
"—" denotes releases that did not chart or were not released in that country.

== EPs ==
- Heaven Can Wait (1990)
- Rebellion in Dreamland (1995)
- Silent Miracles (1996)
- Valley of the Kings (1997)
- Skeletons & Majesties (2011)
- Master of Confusion (2013)

=== Live albums ===
- Alive '95 (1996)
- Skeletons in the Closet (2003)
- Hell Yeah! The Awesome Foursome (2008)
- Skeletons & Majesties Live (2012)
- Heading for the East (2015, recorded 1990)
- Lust for Live (2016, recorded 1994)
- 30 Years Live Anniversary (2021)

=== Compilation albums ===
- The Karaoke Album (1997)
- Blast from the Past (2000)
- Alright! 20 Years of Universe (2010)
- The Best (Of) (2015)

== Singles ==
- "Heaven Can Wait/Mr. Outlaw" (1989)
- "Who Do You Think You Are?" (1990)
- "Future Madhouse" (1993)
- "Heaven or Hell" (2001)
- "Wannabees / One Life*" (2010)
- "Avalon" (2014)
- "Pale Rider" (2014)
- "I Wil Return" (2014)
- "Time for Deliverance" (2014)

== Videos and DVDs ==
- Heading for the East (1990 VHS, 1991 Laserdisc, 2003 DVD)
- Lust for Live (1994 VHS, 1994 Laserdisc, 2003 DVD)
- Hell Yeah – The Awesome Foursome (And the Finnish Keyboarder Who Didn't Want to Wear His Donald Duck Costume) Live in Montreal (2008)
- To The Metal - Limited Edition Bonus DVD The Making of To The Metal (2009)
- Skeletons & Majesties Live (2012)
- Empire of the Undead - CD/DVD Deluxe Edition (2014)
- 30 Years of Amazing Awesomeness (2021)

== Music videos ==
- "Space Eater" (1990)
- "One with the World" (1991)
- "Gamma Ray" (1993)
- "Rebellion in Dreamland" (1995)
- "Send Me a Sign" (1999)
- "Heart of the Unicorn" (2001)
- "Eagle" (2001)
- "Into the Storm" (2007)
- "To the Metal" (2010)
- "Rise" (2010)
- "Empathy" (2010)
- "Master of Confusion" (2013)
- "Hellbent" (2014)
