= The Best Of (Gamma Ray album) =

The Best (of)

Compilation album by Gamma Ray
- Released: 30 January 2015
- Recorded: 1990–2014
- Genre: Power metal, speed metal, heavy metal
- Length: 2:33:16
- Label: EarMusic
- Producer: Various

The Best (Of) is a compilation album of German power metal band Gamma Ray, released on 30 January 2015.

The Best (Of) has been released as 2-disc Standard Edition, 4-vinyl-Gatefold, and a high-quality 2-disc Limited Edition in an elaborate and exclusive leather-style package. All tracks were remastered in 2014 by Eike Freese.

== Tracklisting ==
Disc 1
No.	Title	Writer(s)	Original album (Year)	Length
1.	"Armageddon"	Kai Hansen	Powerplant (1999)	8:45
2.	"Heaven Can Wait"	Hansen	Heading for Tomorrow (1990)	4:30
3.	"Hellbent"	Kai Hansen	Empire of the Undead (2014)	5:23
4.	"Dream Healer" (From "Blast from the Past" (2000), sung by Kai Hansen)	Hansen, Ralf Scheepers	Sigh No More (1991)	7:35
5.	"Land of the Free"	Hansen	Land of the Free (1995)	4:39
6.	"To the Metal"	Hansen	To the Metal (2010)	5:30
7.	"Somewhere out in Space"	Hansen	Somewhere out in Space (1997)	5:28
8.	"Real World"	Kai Hansen	Land of the Free II (2008)	5:42
9.	"Induction"	Hansen	No World Order (2001)	0:58
10.	"Dethrone Tyranny"	Daniel Zimmermann	No World Order (2001)	4:14
11.	"Rebellion in Dreamland" (From "Blast from the Past" (2000), sung by Kai Hansen)	Hansen	Land of the Free (1995)	8:47
12.	"Heading for Tomorrow" (From "Blast from the Past" (2000), sung by Kai Hansen)	Hansen	Heading for Tomorrow (1990)	14:18

Disc 2
No.	Title	Writer(s)	Original album (Year)	Length
1.	"Eagle"	Hansen	No World Order (2001)	6:07
2.	"Avalon"	Hansen	Empire of the Undead (2014)	9:22
3.	"Man on a Mission"	Kai Hansen	Land of the Free (1995)	5:50
4.	"The Spirit" (Sung by Ralf Scheepers)	Hansen, Uwe Wessel, Scheepers	Sigh No More (1991)	4:18
5.	"Tribute to the Past" (Sung by Scheepers)	Hansen, Jan Rubach	Insanity and Genius (1993)	5:04
6.	"Empathy"	Hansen	To the Metal (2010)	5:02
7.	"Valley of the Kings"	Hansen	Somewhere out in Space (1997)	3:51
8.	"Lust for Life" (From "Blast from the Past" (2000), sung by Kai Hansen)	Hansen	Heading for Tomorrow (1990)	5:27
9.	"Master of Confusion" (2013 EP version)	Hansen	Empire of the Undead (2014)	4:55
10.	"Blood Religion"	Hansen	Majestic (2005)	6:55
11.	"Time to Break Free" (Sung by Michael Kiske)	Hansen	Land of the Free (1995)	4:39
12.	"Insurrection"	Hansen	Land of the Free II (2008)	11:34
13.	"Send me a Sign"	Henjo Richter	Power Plant (1999)	4:07
