= Hell Yeah! The Awesome Foursome =

Hell Yeah!!! The Awesome Foursome

Live album by Gamma Ray
- Released: 24 October 2008
- Recorded: 6 May 2006 (Montreal, Canada); 15 January 2008 (Barcelona, Spain)
- Genre: Power metal, speed metal
- Length: 124:01
- Label: SPV

Gamma Ray live chronology
Skeletons in the Closet (2003)	Hell Yeah!!! The Awesome Foursome (2008)

Professional ratings
Review scores
Source	Rating
Allmusic	3.5/5 stars
Lords of Metal	85/100

Hell Yeah!!! The Awesome Foursome (subtitled "And the Finnish keyboarder who didn't want to wear his Donald Duck costume: Live in Montreal")) is a live album from the German power metal band Gamma Ray, released in 2008.

== Track listing ==
Disc 1

1. "Welcome" (from Heading for Tomorrow)
2. "Gardens of the Sinner" (from Power Plant)
3. "New World Order" (from No World Order)
4. "Man On A Mission" (from Land of the Free)
5. "Fight" (from Majestic)
6. "Blood Religion" (from Majestic)
7. "Heavy Metal Universe" (†) (from Power Plant)
8. "Dream Healer" (from Sigh No More)
9. "The Heart Of The Unicorn" (from No World Order)
10. "Fairytale" (from Land of the Free)
11. "The Silence" (from Heading for Tomorrow)

Disc 2

1. "Beyond The Black Hole" (from Somewhere Out in Space)
2. "Valley Of The Kings" (from Somewhere Out in Space)
3. "Somewhere Out In Space" (from Somewhere Out in Space)
4. "Land Of The Free" (from Land of the Free)
5. "Rebellion In Dreamland" (from Land of the Free)
6. "I Want Out" (from Keeper of the Seven Keys, Pt. 2 by Helloween)
7. "Send Me A Sign" (from Power Plant)

Bonus Tracks:

1. "Into The Storm" (from Land of the Free II)
2. "Empress" (from Land of the Free II)
3. "From The Ashes" (from Land of the Free II)
4. "Real World" (from Land of the Free II)

† Includes some snippets from Deep Purple songs like "Woman from Tokyo" and the Made in Japan version of "Strange Kind of Woman"

== Credits ==
- Lead Vocals & Guitars: Kai Hansen
- Guitars & Vocals: Henjo Richter
- Bass & Vocals: Dirk Schlächter
- Drums & Vocals: Dan Zimmermann

Special Guest:

- Keyboards & Vocals: Eero Kaukomies

== Charts ==
Chart (2008)	Peak position
German Albums (Offizielle Top 100)	79
Japanese Albums (Oricon)	172
