= Skeletons in the Closet (Gamma Ray album) =

Live album by Gamma Ray
- Released: 25 August 2003
- Recorded: Barcelona on 31 October 2002; Strasbourg on 2 November 2002
- Genre: Power metal, speed metal
- Length: 103:19
- Label: Sanctuary Records

Gamma Ray live chronology
Alive '95 (1996)	Skeletons in the Closet (2003)	Hell Yeah! The Awesome Foursome (2008)

Skeletons in the Closet is a live album from the German power metal band Gamma Ray, released in 2003. It mostly featured songs that the band had never played live before. The setlist was voted by fans on the band's official website.

== Track listing ==
Disc 1

1. "Welcome" (Hansen) - 1:07 (from Heading for Tomorrow)
2. "Gardens of the Sinner" (Hansen, Zimmermann) - 5:48 (from Power Plant)
3. "Rich and Famous" (Hansen) - 5:13 (from Sigh No More)
4. "All of the Damned" (Hansen) - 5:00 (from Land of the Free)
5. "No Return" (Hansen) - 4:13 (from Insanity and Genius)
6. "Armageddon" (Hansen) - 9:24 (from Power Plant)
7. "Heavy Metal Universe" (Hansen) - 7:43 (from Power Plant)
8. "One with the World" (Hansen, Wessel) - 4:50 (from Sigh No More)
9. "Dan's Solo" (Zimmermann) - 5:21

Disc 2

1. "Razorblade Sigh" (Hansen) - 5:00 (from Power Plant)
2. "Heart of the Unicorn" (Hansen) - 4:41 (from No World Order)
3. "Last Before the Storm" (Hansen) - 4:38 (from Insanity and Genius)
4. "Victim of Fate" (Hansen) - 7:00 (from Helloween's self-titled debut EP Helloween)
5. "Rising Star/Shine On" (Hansen, Schlächter) - 7:52 (from Somewhere Out in Space)
6. "The Silence" (Hansen) - 6:44 (from Heading for Tomorrow)
7. "Heaven or Hell" (Hansen) - 4:16 (from No World Order)
8. "Guardians of Mankind" (Richter) - 5:21 (from Somewhere Out in Space)
9. "New World Order" (Hansen) - 8:22 (from No World Order)

== Credits ==
- Lead Vocals & Guitars: Kai Hansen
- Guitars & Vocals: Henjo Richter
- Bass & Vocals: Dirk Schlächter
- Drums & Vocals: Daniel Zimmermann
- Keyboards & Vocals: Axel Mackenrott

== Charts ==
Chart (2003)	Peak position
French Albums (SNEP)	141
German Albums (Offizielle Top 100)	56
