= Rebellion in Dreamland =

Rebellion In Dreamland

EP by Gamma Ray
- Released: 3 May 1995
- Genre: Power metal
- Length: 23:03
- Label: Noise Records
- Producer: Kai Hansen

Gamma Ray EP chronology
Future Madhouse (1993)	Rebellion In Dreamland (1995)	Silent Miracles (1996)

Rebellion In Dreamland was an EP released in 1995 by the German power metal band Gamma Ray, prior to the release of their album Land of the Free. This is the first release with Kai Hansen on vocals since the departure of Ralf Scheepers.

== Track listing ==
1. "Rebellion in Dreamland" – 8:43 (Hansen)
2. "Land of the Free" – 4:37 (Hansen)
3. "Heavy Metal Mania" (Holocaust cover) – 4:49 (Mortimer)
4. "As Time Goes By" – 4:54 (Hansen/Sielck)
- "Rebellion in Dreamland" and "Land of the Free" also appear on the album Land of the Free.
- "As Time Goes By" also appears on the album Sigh No More.

== Lineup ==
- Kai Hansen - vocals, guitar
- Dirk Schlächter - guitar
- Jan Rubach - bass
- Thomas Nack - drums
