= Heading for the East =

Video by Gamma Ray
- Released: December 1990 (VHS); 2003 (DVD); 2015 (CD)
- Recorded: Shibuya Kokaido & Shiba Mielparque Hall, Tokyo, November 8–9, 1990
- Genre: Power metal

Gamma Ray chronology
Heading for Tomorrow (1990)	Heading for the East (1990)	Sigh No More (1991)

Heading for the East was recorded in 1990 by the German power metal band Gamma Ray following the release of their album Heading for Tomorrow.

== Critical reception ==
Metal.de said the sound isn't too artificial despite the remastering and said the live atmosphere comes across well. Powermetal.de praised Scheepers' vocals on "Lust for Life", "Heaven Can Wait", and "Heading for Tomorrow". Kaaoszine gave a rating of eight out of ten and highlighted "Heaven Can Wait" as the standout track.

== Track listing ==
1. "Opening Titles"
2. "Lust for Life"
3. "Heaven Can Wait"
4. "Space Eater"
5. "Band Documentary"
6. "Freetime"
7. "Who Do You Think You Are"
8. "The Silence"
9. "Save Us"
10. "Band Interview"
11. "I Want Out"
12. "Ride the Sky"
13. "Documentary"
14. "Hold Your Ground"
15. "Money"
16. "Band Interview 2"
17. "Heading for Tomorrow"
18. "End Credits"

== Information ==
- Release date: 1990 (VHS), 2003 (DVD), 2015 (CD)
- Recorded live: 1990
- Cover: Henni Hell
- Photography: Götz Kühnemund / Boggie Kopac
- Producer: Peter Ernst
- Executive producer: Mike Smith
- Director: Steve Payne
- Running time: approximately 90:00
- DVD extra: introduction and track-by-track audio review from journalist Malcolm Dome

== Personnel ==
- Ralf Scheepers – vocals
- Kai Hansen – vocals, guitar
- Dirk Schlächter – guitar, bass, backing vocals
- Uwe Wessel – bass, guitar, backing vocals
- Uli Kusch – drums, backing vocals
- Jorn Ellerbrock – keyboards, piano
