= Master of Confusion =

EP by Gamma Ray
- Released: 15 March 2013
- Genre: Power metal
- Length: 55:24
- Label: earMUSIC

Gamma Ray chronology
Skeletons & Majesties Live (2012)	Master of Confusion (2013)	Empire of the Undead (2014)

Master of Confusion is Gamma Ray's third EP, released on 15 March 2013. The EP contains 10 songs split into 3 sides, with the A Side containing two new studio tracks, the B Side containing 2 studio covers and the C Side containing six live songs from the April 28, 2011, Bochum gig. "Empire of the Undead" and "Master of Confusion" are set to take part on the new Gamma Ray album, Empire of the Undead.

== Track listing ==
A Side
No.	Title	Lyrics	Music	Length
1.	"Empire of the Undead"	Kai Hansen, Piet Sielck	Hansen, Sielck	4:25
2.	"Master of Confusion"	Hansen	Hansen	4:56
Total length:				9:21

B Side
No.	Title	Lyrics	Music	Length
3.	"Death or Glory" (Holocaust cover)	John Mortimer	Mortimer	3:46
4.	"Lost Angels" (Sweet cover)	Sweet	Sweet	4:00
Total length:				7:46

C Side
No.	Title	Lyrics	Music	Length
5.	"The Spirit" (live)	Hansen, Ralf Scheepers	Hansen, Uwe Wessel	4:22
6.	"Wings of Destiny" (live)	Henjo Richter	Richter	6:18
7.	"Gamma Ray" (live, Birth Control cover)	Bruno Frenzel	Frenzel	4:44
8.	"Farewell" (live)	Dirk Schlächter	Schlächter	5:45
9.	"Time to Break Free" (live)	Hansen	Hansen	4:56
10.	"Insurrection" (live)	Hansen	Hansen	12:12
Total length:				38:17

== Personnel ==
Gamma Ray

- Kai Hansen – Lead vocals (all but 9), rhythm guitar
- Henjo Richter – Lead guitar, backing vocals, keyboards
- Dirk Schlächter – Bass, backing vocals
- Michael Ehré – Drums (1–4)

Additional and guest musicians

- Dan Zimmermann – Drums (5–10)
- Michael Kiske – Lead vocals (9)
