= Valley of the Kings (EP) =

EP by Gamma Ray
- Released: 21 May 1997
- Genre: Power metal; speed metal
- Length: 21:57
- Label: Noise Records
- Producer: Kai Hansen, Dirk Schlächter

Gamma Ray EP chronology
Silent Miracles (1996)	Valley of the Kings (1997)

Valley of the Kings is an EP released in 1997 by the German power metal band Gamma Ray prior to the release of their album Somewhere Out in Space. This was the first release from Gamma Ray featuring Henjo Richter on guitar and Dan Zimmermann on drums.

== Track listing ==
1. "Valley of the Kings" – 3:50 (Hansen)
2. "Somewhere out in Space" – 5:28 (Hansen)
3. "Watcher in the Sky" – 5:18 (Sielck/Hansen)
4. "Victim of Changes" (Judas Priest cover) – 7:21 (Atkins, Downing, Halford, Tipton)
- "Valley of the Kings" and "Somewhere Out in Space" also appears on the album Somewhere Out in Space.
- "Watcher in the Sky" appears on both Somewhere Out in Space and Iron Savior's self-titled album.
- "Victim of Changes" also appears on Legends of Metal - A Tribute to Judas Priest Volume I, and in the 2003 reissue of Somewhere Out in Space.

== Personnel ==
- Kai Hansen - vocals, guitar
- Henjo Richter - guitar
- Dirk Schlächter - bass
- Dan Zimmerman - drums
