= Silent Miracles =

EP by Gamma Ray
- Released: 7 February 1996
- Genre: Power metal
- Length: 23:16
- Label: Noise Records
- Producers: Kai Hansen & Dirk Schlächter

Gamma Ray EP chronology
Rebellion In Dreamland (1995)	Silent Miracles (1996)	Valley of the Kings (1997)

Silent Miracles was an EP released in 1996 by the German power metal band Gamma Ray following the release of their album Land of the Free.

== Track listing ==
1. "Miracle" - 7:18 (Hansen / Hansen)
2. "Farewell" - 5:10 (Schlächter / Schlächter)
3. "The Silence" - 6:30 (Hansen / Hansen)
4. "A While In Dreamland" - 4:18 (Schlächter / Hansen)
- "Miracle" is a slow and epic version of "Man On a Mission" from Land of the Free
- "Farewell" also appears on the album Land of the Free.

== Lineup ==
- Kai Hansen - vocals, guitar
- Dirk Schlächter - guitar
- Jan Rubach - bass
- Thomas Nack - drums
