= Heaven Can Wait (Gamma Ray EP) =

EP by Gamma Ray
- Released: October 1990
- Recorded: January – February 1990
- Genre: Power metal
- Length: 23:06
- Label: RCA Records
- Producer: Kai Hansen and Piet Sielck

Gamma Ray EP chronology
Heaven Can Wait (1990)	Who Do You Think You Are? (1990)

Heaven Can Wait was an EP released by German power metal band Gamma Ray in 1990, following the release of their debut album Heading for Tomorrow.

It is notable as Dirk Schlächter makes his first appearance as a full member of the band. He would go on to appear on every Gamma Ray record to date. Also making his first appearance with the band was Uli Kusch, who would later go on to Helloween, and later will form Masterplan with former Helloween member Roland Grapow.

The Japanese version only has four tracks, leaving off "Who Do You Think You Are?". It also has a blue background rather than a black background on the cover, as well as a full-color figure instead of the yellow shadow pictured. "Sail On", "Mr. Outlaw", and "Lonesome Stranger" are bonus tracks on the 2003 remaster of Heading for Tomorrow, while "Who Do You Think You Are?" is a bonus track on the 2003 remaster of Sigh No More.

The Japanese version of the EP contains the same version of "Heaven Can Wait" as the Heading for Tomorrow album. The European EP contains the so-called "band version" of the song, i.e. with Dirk Schlächter on guitar and Uli Kusch on drums. The "band version" can also be found on the Who Do You Think You Are EP.

== Track listing ==
1. "Heaven Can Wait" – 4:28 - European version only; the original recording of the song appears on the Japanese EP.
2. "Who Do You Think You Are?" – 5:07 - European version only
3. "Sail On" – 4:25
4. "Mr. Outlaw" – 4:09
5. "Lonesome Stranger" – 4:57

== Personnel ==
- Ralf Scheepers — lead vocals
- Kai Hansen — guitars
- Dirk Schlächter — guitars
- Uwe Wessel — bass
- Uli Kusch — drums

=== Guest musicians ===
- Tommy Newton — backing vocals
- Fernando Garcia — backing vocals
- Piet Sielck — backing vocals and keyboards on "Sail On"
- Mischa Gerlach — piano on "Heaven Can Wait" and keyboards on "Lonesome Stranger"
- Mathias Burchard — drums on "Sail On", "Mr. Outlaw", "Lonesome Stranger"

== Production ==
- Produced by Kai Hansen
- "Heaven Can Wait" & "Who Do You Think You Are?" co-produced by Piet Sielck
- Recorded and mixed at Karo-Music Studios, Brackel in June 1990
- Mixed and engineered by Piet Sielck & Kalle Trapp
- "Sail On", "Mr. Outlaw" & "Lonesome Stranger" recorded at Horus Studio, Hannover, Jan/Feb 1990
- Engineered by Ralf Krause and Piet Sielck
- Mixed by Tommy Newton and Piet Sielck
