= Skeletons & Majesties =

EP by Gamma Ray
- Released: April 8, 2011
- Recorded: November 2010 – February 2011
- Genres: Power metal; speed metal
- Label: EarMusic
- Producer: Eike Freese

Skeletons & Majesties is an EP of German power metal band Gamma Ray released on 8 April 2011. It was recorded between November 2010 and February 2011 at Hammer Recording Studios Hamburg. Engineered, mixed and mastered by Eike Freese.

Skeletons:

Number	Song	Composer
1	Hold Your Ground	Kai Hansen
2	Brothers	Dirk Schlächter, Ralf Scheepers, Kai Hansen

Majesties:

Number	Song	Composer
3	Send me a Sign (Acoustic)	Henjo Richter
4	Rebellion in Dreamland (Acoustic)	Kai Hansen

Bonus tracks:

Number	Song	Composer
5	Wannabees	Dan Zimmermann
6	Brothers (Extended)	Dirk Schlächter, Ralf Scheepers, Kai Hansen
7	Rebellion in Dreamland (Acoustic, Karaoke)	Kai Hansen
