= Skeletons & Majesties Live =

Live album by Gamma Ray
- Released: 30 November 2012
- Recorded: Live at Z7, Pratteln (Switzerland)
- Genre: Heavy metal, power metal, speed metal
- Length: 114:24
- Label: earMUSIC/Edel Music
- Producer: Kai Hansen

Gamma Ray chronology
To the Metal! (2010)	Skeletons & Majesties Live (2012)	Master of Confusion (2013)

Skeletons & Majesties Live is the fourth live album of the metal band Gamma Ray. The album was recorded during Gamma Ray's 2011 concert in Pratteln (Switzerland) and contains acoustic renditions of the songs Rebellion in Dreamland and Send Me a Sign as well as the guest appearance of then ex-Helloween and Unisonic vocalist Michael Kiske on 3 tracks.

It was released both as an audio CD as well as a DVD on 30 November 2012.

== Track listing ==
=== Disc one ===
1. "Welcome (Intro)" – 2:32
2. "Anywhere In The Galaxy" – 6:13
3. "Men, Martians And Machines" – 3:51
4. "The Spirit" – 4:23
5. "Wings Of Destiny" – 6:23
6. "Farewell" – 5:43
7. "Gamma Ray (Birth Control cover)" – 4:47
8. "Money" – 3:53
9. "Time to Break Free (featuring Michael Kiske)" – 5:16
10. "Rebellion in Dreamland (Acoustic)" – 9:55
11. "Send Me a Sign (Acoustic)" – 4:49

=== Disc two ===
1. "Induction" – 0:57
2. "Dethrone Tyranny" – 4:17
3. "Watcher in the Sky" – 5:27
4. "Hold Your Ground" – 5:07
5. "A While in Dreamland" (featuring Michael Kiske) – 4:28
6. "Rise" – 5:01
7. "Brothers" – 8:34
8. "Insurrection" – 12:45
9. "Future World" (featuring Michael Kiske) – 10:03

== Credits ==
=== Band members ===
- Kai Hansen – Lead vocals (all but 1.9, 2.9), guitars, co-lead vocals (2.5)
- Henjo Richter – Guitar, keyboards
- Dirk Schlächter – Bass, keyboards, guitars
- Dan Zimmermann – Drums

=== Guest musicians ===
- Michael Kiske – lead vocals (1.9, 2.9), co-lead vocals (2.5)
- Corvin Bahn – keyboards
