= Blast from the Past (album) =

Remix album by Gamma Ray
- Released: 20 June 2000
- Studio: Hansen Studio, Hamburg, Germany
- Genre: Power metal; speed metal; heavy metal
- Length: 61:03 (CD 1); 60:26 (CD 2)
- Label: Sanctuary
- Producer: Kai Hansen and Dirk Schlächter

Gamma Ray chronology
Power Plant (1999)	Blast from the Past (2000)	No World Order (2001)

Professional ratings
Review scores
Source	Rating
Allmusic	link
Lords of Metal	90/100
Sputnikmusic	4.5/5 stars

Blast from the Past is a two-CD compilation album that contains re-recordings of older Gamma Ray material from the Ralf Scheepers era, with Kai Hansen singing the vocals, and remasters of more recent tracks. All instruments for old songs were also re-recorded, with new arrangements, by the then current members of the band.

The songs from each era to be included in the compilation were chosen by the band's fans.

== Track listing ==
CD 1
No.	Title	Lyrics	Music	Length
1.	"Welcome"	-	Hansen	0:57
2.	"Lust for Life"	Hansen	Hansen	5:26
3.	"Heaven Can Wait"	Hansen	Hansen	4:30
4.	"Heading for Tomorrow"	Hansen	Hansen	14:59
5.	"Changes"	Hansen, Wessel	Hansen, Scheepers, Schlächter, Wessel	5:29
6.	"Rich & Famous" (Japanese Bonus Track)	Hansen	Hansen	4:52
7.	"One With the World"	Hansen	Hansen, Wessel	4:50
8.	"Dream Healer"	Hansen, Scheepers	Hansen	7:35
9.	"Tribute to the Past"	Hansen	Hansen, Rubach	4:46
10.	"Last Before the Storm"	Hansen	Hansen	4:57
11.	"Heal Me"	Hansen, Schlächter	Schlächter	7:34

CD 2
No.	Title	Lyrics	Music	Length
1.	"Rebellion in Dreamland"	Hansen	Hansen	8:46
2.	"Man On a Mission"	Hansen	Hansen	5:44
3.	"Land of the Free"	Hansen	Hansen	4:38
4.	"The Silence" (('95 version))	Hansen	Hansen	6:29
5.	"Beyond the Black Hole"	Hansen	Hansen, Zimmermann, Schlächter	6:00
6.	"Somewhere Out in Space"	Hansen	Hansen	5:27
7.	"Valley of the Kings"	Hansen	Hansen	3:50
8.	"Anywhere in the Galaxy"	Hansen	Hansen	6:36
9.	"Send Me a Sign"	Richter	Richter	4:06
10.	"Armageddon"	Hansen	Hansen	8:50

Note: All tracks on CD 1 and tracks 1–3 on CD 2 are completely new recordings from the year 2000. Tracks 4–10 on CD2 are remastered versions of the original recordings.

== Personnel ==
- Kai Hansen - vocals, guitar
- Henjo Richter - guitar, keyboards
- Dirk Schlächter - bass
- Dan Zimmermann - drums

=== Production ===
- Mixed at: Hansen Studio, Hamburg, Germany
- Engineered by: Dirk Schlächter, Kai Hansen

== Credits ==
- Cover Art by: Derek Riggs
- Digital Artwork and Booklet Design by: Henjo Richter
