= Alive '95 =

Live album by Gamma Ray
- Released: 28 May 1996
- Recorded: October–November 1995
- Venue: Milan, Paris, Madrid, Pamplona and Erlangen
- Genre: Power metal
- Length: 64:37 (original EU edition); 70:51 (Japanese edition); 101:07 (2 CD edition)
- Label: Sanctuary Records

Gamma Ray live chronology
Alive '95 (1996)	Skeletons in the Closet (2003)

Alive '95 was the first live album by Kai Hansen's Gamma Ray. It was released in May 1996, following the live concerts in Milan, Paris, Madrid, Pamplona and Erlangen, during the band's "Men on a Tour" European tour.

== Track listing ==
All music and lyrics by Kai Hansen except where noted:

=== Disc 1 ===
1. "Land of the Free" – 5:29
2. "Man on a Mission" – 5:54
3. "Rebellion in Dreamland" – 8:24
4. "Space Eater" – 4:45
5. "Fairytale" – 0:44
6. "Tribute to the Past" (music: Kai Hansen & Jan Erik Rubach, words: Hansen) – 4:48
7. "Heal Me" (music: Dirk Schlächter, words: Schlächter, Hansen) – 7:27
8. "The Saviour" – 1:30
9. "Abyss of the Void" – 5:54
10. "Ride the Sky" (Helloween cover) – 5:57
11. "Future World" (Helloween cover) – 7:28
12. "Heavy Metal Mania" (Holocaust cover) (music & words: Edmund Ryczard Trevor Arthur Dudley & John Grant Mortimer) – 6:27
13. "Lust for Life" (Non-European Bonus) – 6:14

=== Disc 2 - Reissue Bonus (Live in 1993) ===
1. "No Return" – 4:03
2. "Changes" (music: Hansen, Ralf Scheepers, Schlächter, Uwe Wessel; words: Hansen & Wessel) – 5:23
3. "Insanity and Genius" (music: Rubach, words: Thomas Nack) – 4:09
4. "Last Before the Storm" – 4:11
5. "Future Madhouse" (music: Hansen, words: Hansen & Scheepers) – 4:10
6. "Heading for Tomorrow" (music: Hansen, words: Hansen & Scheepers) – 8:17

== Credits ==
- Lead Vocals: Kai Hansen (CD1); Ralf Scheepers (CD2)
- Guitars: Kai Hansen
- Guitars & Keyboards: Dirk Schlächter
- Bass Guitars: Jan Rubach
- Drums: Thomas Nack
