= Dirk Schlächter =

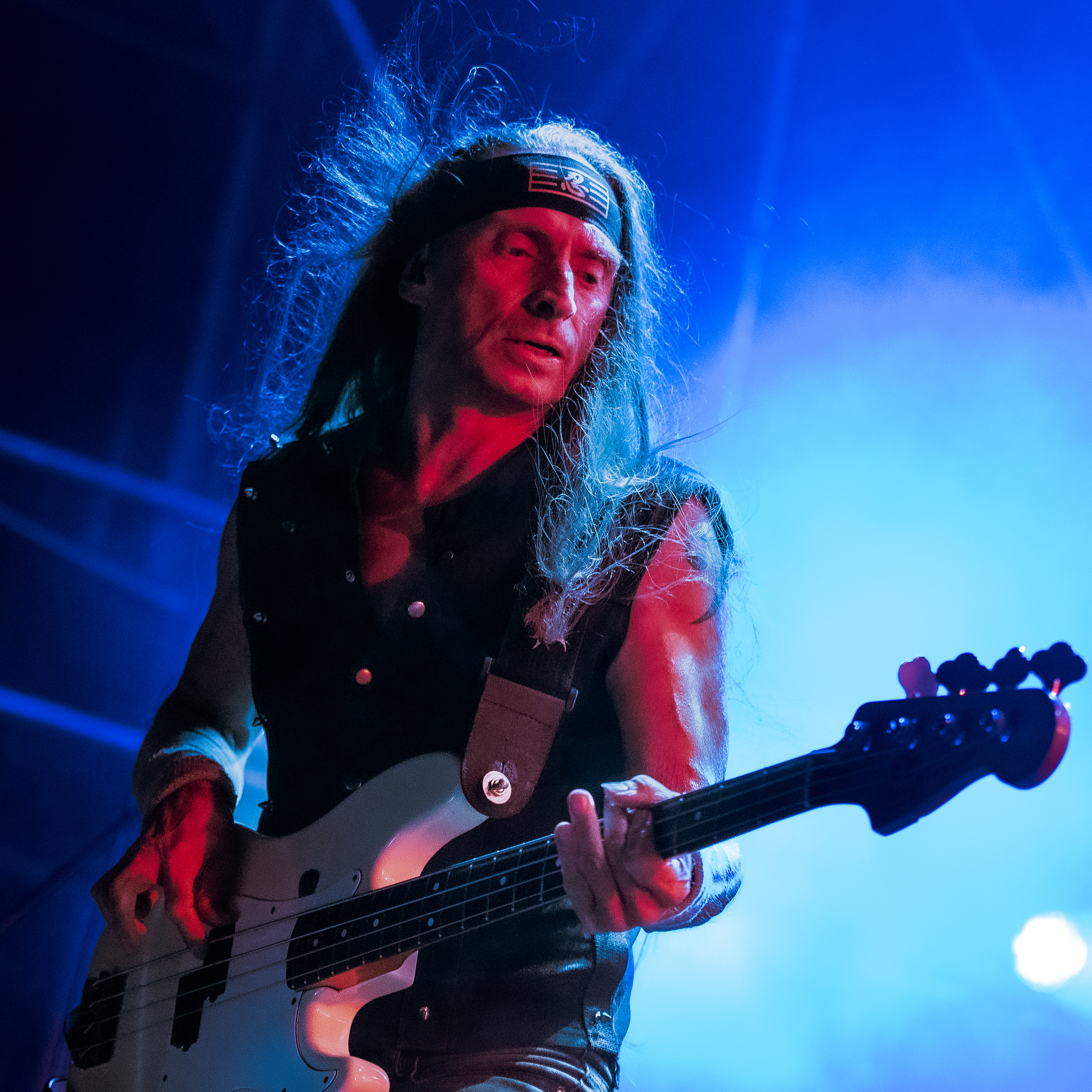
- Dirk Schlächter performing live in July 2024

Background information
- Birth name: Dirk Schlächter
- Born: 15 February 1965 (age 60); Bad Nauheim, West Germany
- Genres: Power metal, speed metal, heavy metal
- Occupation: Musician
- Instrument(s): Guitar, bass, vocals, keyboards, piano
- Years active: 1985–present
- Labels: Sanctuary

Dirk Schlächter (born 15 February 1965, in Bad Nauheim, West Germany) is the bassist of the power metal band Gamma Ray.

== History ==
Dirk got in touch with music for the first time joining a music school at the age of 8. At the age of 11 he got his first acoustic guitar followed by an electric guitar at the age of 15. At the age of 19 he turned to bass guitar. During this time he played in bands called Blue Life, Sold Out, Louis Glover House Band and Drivin' Force.

Dirk appeared as a guest musician on Gamma Ray's first album, Heading For Tomorrow, playing bass on the track "Money" and parts of the track "The Silence". The rest of the bass-parts on the album were recorded by Uwe Wessel. Schlächter was hired to play bass with Gamma Ray for their first tour, but as Uwe Wessel's former band split up at this point Schlächter replaced him. Schlächter was then offered the job of second guitarist.

From this point on Schlächter became Gamma Ray's permanent second guitarist. He played guitar on the albums Sigh No More, Insanity and Genius and Land of the Free. After the Land of the Free album Schlächter was supposed to swap positions with bassist Jan Rubach, but instead Rubach quit the band. Schlächter took over the position of bassist and Henjo Richter became the band's new guitarist. The release of the album Somewhere Out In Space marked Schlächter's return to playing bass, a job he has had ever since.

Schlächter is also the producer of Gamma Ray albums since Insanity and Genius, along with the band's mainman Kai Hansen.

In 2013, he joined German symphonic metal band Neopera.

From 2018 to 2022 he was the bassist of the Spanish band Avalanch.

== Discography ==
=== Gamma Ray ===
==== Studio albums ====
- Heading for Tomorrow (1990) (as a guest musician, playing bass on two tracks)
- Sigh No More (1991)
- Insanity and Genius (1993)
- Land of the Free (1995)
- Somewhere Out in Space (1997)
- Power Plant (1999)
- No World Order (2001)
- Majestic (2005)
- Land of the Free II (2007)
- To The Metal (2010)
- Empire Of The Undead (2014)

==== Live albums ====
- Alive '95 (1996)
- Skeletons in the Closet (2003)
- Hell Yeah! The Awesome Foursome (2008)
- Skeletons & Majesties Live (2012)

==== Extended plays (EPs) ====
- Heaven Can Wait (1990)
- Who Do You Think You Are? (1990)
- Future Madhouse (1993)
- Rebellion In Dreamland (1995)
- Silent Miracles (1996)
- Valley of the Kings (1997)
- Heaven Or Hell (2001)
- Master of Confusion (2013)

==== Compilation albums ====
- The Karaoke Album (1997)
- Hansen Worx (1998)
- Blast from the Past (2000)
- Alright! 20 Years Of Universe (2010)
- The Best (Of) (2015)

==== Videos and DVDs ====
- Heading for the East (1990)
- Lust for Live (1993)
- Hell Yeah! The Awesome Foursome (2008)
- Skeletons & Majesties Live (2012)

=== Neopera ===
==== Studio albums ====
- Destined Ways (2014)

==== Singles ====
- The Marvel of Chimera (2013)

=== Avalanch ===
- Avalanch - The Secret (2019)
- Avalanch - El Secreto (2019)

=== As a guest ===
- Heavens Gate - Hell for Sale! (1992)
- Angra - Angels Cry (1993)
- Lanzer - Under a Different Sun (1995)
- Iron Savior - Iron Savior (1997)
- Freedom Call - Taragon (EP) (1999)
- Brainstorm - Ambiguity (2000)
- Stormwarrior - Stormwarrior (2002)
- Stormwarrior - Heavy Metal Fire (EP) (2003)
- Bassinvaders - Hellbassbeaters (2008)
- Flashback of Anger - Splinters of Life (2009)
- Black Hawk - Straight to Hell (2010)
- In Arkadia - Wasteland Chronicles (2010)
