= Land of the Free (Gamma Ray album) =

Studio album by Gamma Ray
- Released: 29 May 1995
- Recorded: November 1994 – January 1995
- Studio: Hansen Studio, Hamburg; R.A.S.H. Studio, Gelsenkirchen, Germany (drums)
- Genre: Power metal
- Length: 56:43
- Label: Noise
- Producer: Kai Hansen, Dirk Schlächter

Gamma Ray chronology
Insanity and Genius (1993)	Land of the Free (1995)	Somewhere Out in Space (1997)

Land of the Free is the fourth studio album by German power metal band Gamma Ray, released in 1995. It is considered a concept album, telling a story of rebellion of Good against Evil. Continuing a trend that would conclude with the band's fifth studio release, the lineup for the album was different from the previous one, as Land of the Free was the first Gamma Ray album to be released since the departure of Ralf Scheepers, leaving guitarist and founder Kai Hansen to take up lead vocals. While not his first stint as a vocalist (Hansen had sung lead for Helloween until 1987 and had also recorded lead vocals on "Heal Me" from Insanity and Genius), it would be the first time he had performed lead vocals exclusively in 8 years.

Additionally, bassist Jan Rubach was to swap positions with guitarist Dirk Schlächter. Rubach initially agreed, but then resisted making the move. Rubach and drummer Thomas Nack instead decided to leave Gamma Ray. Rubach left towards the tail end of Men on a Tour; Schlächter took over the bass duties and Henjo Richter took over as the second guitarist. Nack would complete the tour and then leave, with both Rubach and Nack rejoining their former band Anesthesia.

Michael Kiske (ex-Helloween) and Hansi Kürsch (Blind Guardian) were featured on the album as guest vocalists.

The track "Afterlife" was written as a tribute to Ingo Schwichtenberg, Kai Hansen's former bandmate in Helloween, who committed suicide some 11 weeks before that album's release.

Along with most of the band's past catalogue, the album was re-released in 2003 with a different cover and expanded track list which featured three tracks that had either appeared as bonuses on various editions of the album (namely "Heavy Metal Mania", which was a Japanese bonus track on the original release) or were unreleased tracks.

== Reception ==
Professional ratings
Review scores
Source	Rating
AllMusic	4.5/5 stars
Classic Rock	6/10 stars
Collector's Guide to Heavy Metal	7/10
Rock Hard	9.5/10
Sputnikmusic	5/5

In a contemporary review by the German magazine Rock Hard, Land of the Free was elected Album of the Month and described as "the best, heaviest and most polished Gamma Ray album since Heading for Tomorrow".

Modern critics praised the album, with Antti J. Ravelin of AllMusic stating that it served "the definition of power metal well and is indeed one of the most metal albums of the late '90s". Mike Stagno of Sputnikmusic wrote that "if there was ever an essential power metal album, Land of the Free would be that album" and noticed how "Gamma Ray took their songwriting to a new level", putting "an emphasis on speed and melody, but also aggression and power". Canadian journalist Martin Popoff was less enthusiastic and stated that Land of the Free was too similar to a Helloween album for his taste, remarking how speed metal was more "insistent and persistent than in the past." Jerry Ewing of Classic Rock lamented the absence of Ralf Scheepers' vocals and defined the material on the album as "merely adequate".

The album was ranked fourth by Loudwire in their list "Top 25 Power Metal Albums of All Time" and at fifth in a similar list by Metal Hammer in 2019. ThoughtCo also named it in their list "Essential Power Metal Albums."

== Track listing ==
All music and lyrics written by Kai Hansen, except where indicated

No.	Title	Lyrics	Music	Length
1.	"Rebellion in Dreamland"			8:44
2.	"Man on a Mission"			5:49
3.	"Fairytale"			0:50
4.	"All of the Damned"			5:00
5.	"Rising of the Damned"			0:43
6.	"Gods of Deliverance"		Jan Rubach	5:01
7.	"Farewell"	Dirk Schlächter	Schlächter	5:11
8.	"Salvation's Calling"	Rubach	Rubach	4:36
9.	"Land of the Free"			4:38
10.	"The Saviour"			0:40
11.	"Abyss of the Void"			6:04
12.	"Time to Break Free"			4:40
13.	"Afterlife"		Rubach	4:46

2003 release bonus tracks
No.	Title	Lyrics	Music	Length
14.	"Heavy Metal Mania" (Holocaust cover)	John Mortimer	Mortimer	4:49
15.	"As Time Goes By" (pre-production version)	Hansen, Piet Sielck	Hansen, Sielck	4:53
16.	"The Silence '95"			6:29

- "Heavy Metal Mania" and "As Time Goes By (pre-production version)" also appear on the Rebellion in Dreamland EP.
- "The Silence '95" also appears on the Silent Miracles EP.

=== Anniversary Edition bonus disc ===
No.	Title	Length
1.	"Heavy Metal Mania"	4:49
2.	"As Time Goes By" (pre-production version)	4:53
3.	"The Silence '95"	6:29
4.	"Dream Healer" (instrumental - live at Chameleon Studios 2017)	8:23
5.	"Tribute to the Past" (instrumental - live at Chameleon Studios 2017)	4:57
6.	"Heaven Can Wait" (instrumental - live at Chameleon Studios 2016)	4:48
7.	"Valley of the Kings" (instrumental - live at Chameleon Studios 2016)	3:45
Total length:		38:04

== Personnel ==
Gamma Ray

- Kai Hansen – lead vocals (all but track 12), backing vocals, guitars, producer, engineer, mixing on tracks 4, 7, 9
- Dirk Schlächter – guitars, keyboards, producer, engineer, mixing on tracks 4, 7, 9
- Jan Rubach – bass
- Thomas Nack – drums, backing vocals

Guest musicians

- Sascha Paeth – keyboards and programming
- Hansi Kürsch – co-lead vocals on track 7, backing vocals on tracks 9 and 11
- Michael Kiske – lead vocals on track 12, co-lead and backing vocals on track 9
- Hacky Hackmann, Catharina Boutari, Axel Naschke – backing vocals

Production

- Charlie Bauerfeind – mixing at Horus Sound Studio, Hannover
- Ralf Lindner – mastering

== Charts ==
Chart (1993)	Peak position
German Albums (Offizielle Top 100)	70
Japanese Albums (Oricon)	17
