= Holocaust (band) =

Scottish heavy metal band

- Origin: Edinburgh, Scotland
- Genres: Heavy metal; New wave of British heavy metal
- Years active: 1978–1983, 1984, 1988–present
- Labels: Phoenix Record and Filmworks / Edgy Records / Sleazy Rider Records
- Members: John Mortimer (Guitar/Vocals); Scott Wallace (Drums); Steve Walker (Guitar); Jonny Hall (Guitar); Craig Shortel (Bass)
- Past members: Ed Dudley; Gary Lettice; Robin Begg; Paul Collins; Steven Cowen; Graham Hall; Iain McKenzie; John McCullim; David Rosie; Nicky Arkless; Ron Levine; Bryan Bartley; Raymond Marciano; Graham Cowen; Mark McGrath; Danny McGrath; Andy Colliar
- Website: Holocaust on Facebook

Holocaust are a Scottish heavy metal band founded in 1978 and based in Edinburgh.

The band's lineup is John Mortimer (Guitar/Vocals), Scott Wallace (Drums), Steve Walker (Guitar), Jonny Hall (Guitar) and Craig Shortel (Bass). The original lineup featured guitarists John Mortimer and Ed Dudley, vocalist Gary Lettice, bassist Robin Begg and drummer Nick Brockie. In 1983, guitar player Ed Dudley left the band, forming and releasing an album under the moniker Hologram. Holocaust was one of the Scottish bands in the new wave of British heavy metal scene in the late 1970s and early 1980s, deviating from the more commercial new wave music of the day, and combining earlier metal with the tempo and attitude of punk rock. The name alludes to a nuclear holocaust; Mortimer felt that "when someone hears us, it should be like a nuclear bomb going off".

The John Mortimer-led Holocaust incorporated many progressive metal, thrash metal and post-punk influences into its sound, releasing complex pieces such as the "Sound of Souls" EP and concept album Covenant. The band's three-piece lineup has remained the same since 2003, releasing the EP "Expander" and the album Predator in 2015, and most recently the album "Elder Gods" in 2019.

Holocaust's song, "The Small Hours", was covered by Metallica in 1987 and released on their The $5.98 E.P. - Garage Days Re-Revisited EP, and reappeared on their 1998 compilation album Garage Inc.

In 1996, Holocaust recorded a cover of Metallica's "Master of Puppets" for the compilation Metal Militia: A Tribute To Metallica II.

== Discography ==
=== Albums ===
- The Nightcomers (1981)
- Steal the Stars (1983) released under the name 'Hologram'
- No Man's Land (1984)
- The Sound of Souls (1989)
- Hypnosis of Birds (1992)
- Spirits Fly (1996)
- Covenant (1997)
- The Courage to Be (2000)
- Primal (2003)
- Predator (2015)
- Elder Gods (2019)
- Luna (T.B.C)

=== Live albums ===
- Live (Hot Curry & Wine) (1983)

=== EPs and singles ===
- "Heavy Metal Mania" (1980, 7-inch, 12-inch)
- "Smokin' Valves" (1980, 7-inch, 12-inch)
- Live from the Raw Loud 'n' Live Tour (1981, 7-inch)
- Comin' Through (1982, 12-inch)
- Heavy Metal Mania '93 (1993, CD)
- Expander (2013, CD)

=== Compilations ===
- NWOBHM '79 Revisited (1990)
- Metal Militia: A Tribute To Metallica II (1996)
- Smokin' Valves: The Anthology (2003)

=== Videos ===
- Live from the Raw Loud 'n' Live Tour (1981, VHS; 2004, DVD)

== Cover versions ==
- Metallica covered the song "The Small Hours" (as above).
- Gamma Ray covered the song "Heavy Metal Mania" on their 1996 live album Alive '95. There was also a studio version released as a bonus song with their 1995 album Land of the Free. In 2013, Gamma Ray recorded the song "Death or Glory" for their EP "Master of Confusion".
- Six Feet Under covered the song "Death or Glory" from The Nightcomers album on their 1997 Warpath record.

== See also ==
- List of new wave of British heavy metal bands
