= Empire of the Undead =

Studio album by Gamma Ray
- Released: 28 March 2014
- Recorded: at Hammer Studios, Hamburg, Germany (partially)
- Genre: Power metal
- Length: 56:46
- Label: earMUSIC
- Producer: Eike Freese and Dirk Schlächter

Gamma Ray chronology
Master of Confusion (2013)	Empire of the Undead (2014)

Professional ratings
Review scores
Source	Rating
About.com	4/5 stars
AllMusic	3/5 stars
Blabbermouth.net	8.5/10 stars
Metal Hammer	6/7 stars
Metal Storm	8/10 stars

Empire of the Undead is the eleventh studio album by German power metal band Gamma Ray, released on 28 March 2014. It was their first album to feature new drummer Michael Ehré following Dan Zimmermann's departure in 2012.

== Background ==
Kai Hansen revealed in an interview with Metal Blast in April 2013 that their upcoming album, Empire of the Undead, to be released in 2014, would have a "more thrashy" sound. In the same interview, Dirk Schlächter announced that the band would do a headlining tour following its release, in March or April 2014.

== Track listing ==
Credits via the album's liner notes.

No.	Title	Lyrics	Music	Length
1.	"Avalon"	Kai Hansen	Hansen	9:21
2.	"Hellbent"	Hansen	Hansen	5:22
3.	"Pale Rider"	Hansen	Michael Ehré	4:23
4.	"Born to Fly"	Henjo Richter	Richter	4:31
5.	"Master of Confusion"	Hansen	Hansen	4:54
6.	"Empire of the Undead"	Hansen	Hansen	4:25
7.	"Time for Deliverance"	Dirk Schlächter, Hansen	Schlächter	5:10
8.	"Demonseed"	Hansen	Schlächter	6:38
9.	"Seven"	Hansen	Hansen	5:07
10.	"I Will Return"	Richter	Richter	6:55
Total length:				56:46

Japanese bonus track
No.	Title	Writer(s)	Length
11.	"Someday"	Hansen	3:59

European bonus track
No.	Title	Lyrics	Music	Length
11.	"Built a World"	Hansen	Andy Portmann, Hansen	4:22

CD/DVD Digipack bonus tracks
No.	Title	Length
12.	"Avalon" (live from the final studio sessions)	9:52
13.	"The Spirit" (live from the final studio sessions)	4:19
14.	"Empire of the Undead" (live from the final studio sessions)	4:27

== Personnel ==
- Kai Hansen – lead guitar, lead vocals
- Henjo Richter – rhythm guitar, backing vocals, keyboards
- Dirk Schlächter – bass, backing vocals
- Michael Ehré – drums

== Charts ==
Chart (2014)	Peak position
Austrian Albums (Ö3 Austria)	46
Belgian Albums (Ultratop Flanders)	104
Belgian Albums (Ultratop Wallonia)	71
Czech Album Charts	5
Finnish Albums (Suomen virallinen lista)	12
French Albums (SNEP)	89
German Albums (Offizielle Top 100)	13
Japanese Albums (Oricon)	52
Swedish Albums (Sverigetopplistan)	26
Swiss Albums (Schweizer Hitparade)	21
UK Independent Albums (OCC)	38
UK Rock & Metal Albums (OCC)	15
