= Neopera =

German metal band

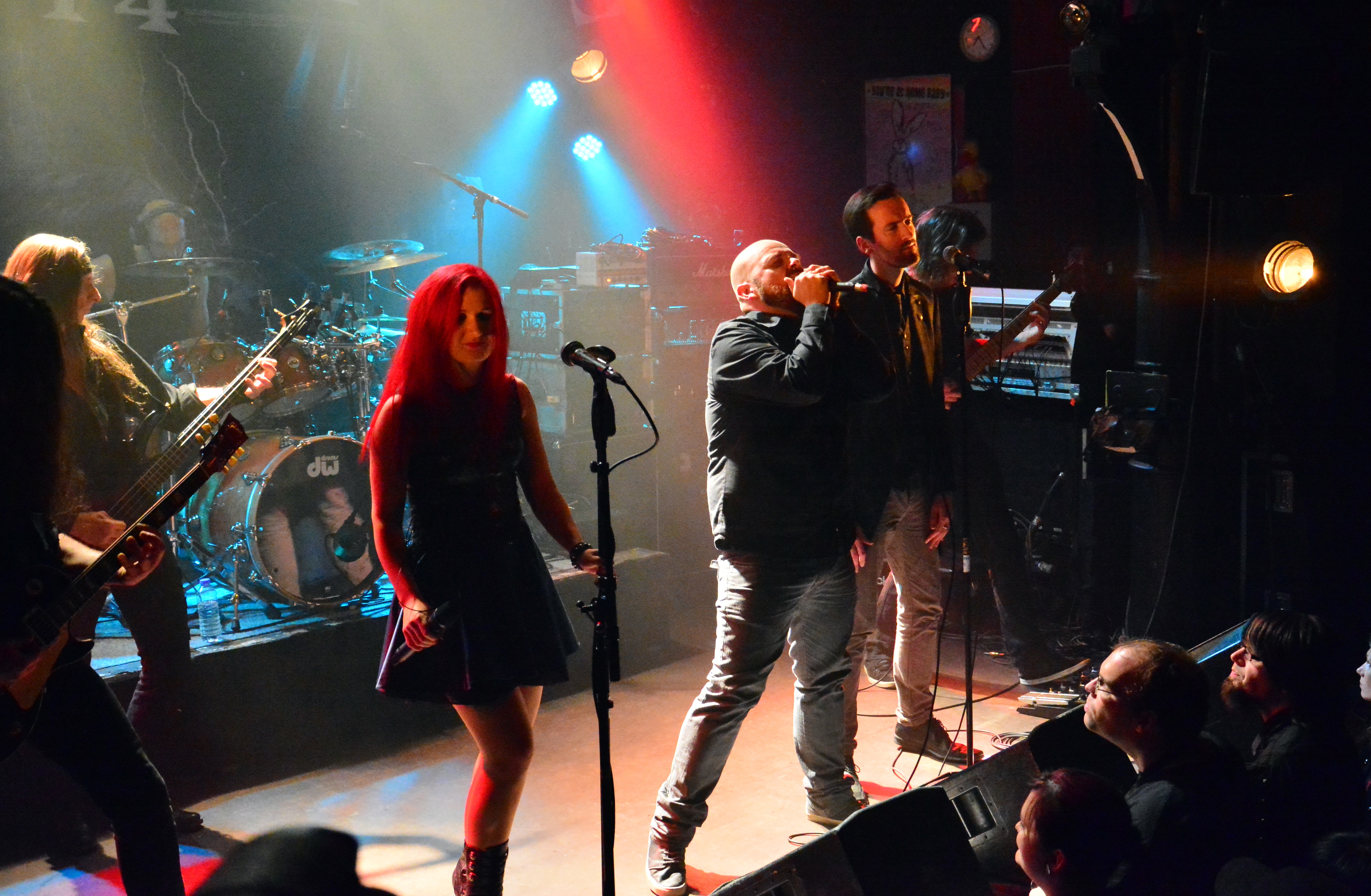
- Neopera band members

Background information
- Origin: Hamburg, Germany
- Genres: Symphonic metal
- Years active: 2011–present
- Members: Jasmin Gajewski; Wiebke Krull; Thorsten Schuck; Dawid Wieczorek; Vincenzo Vic M. Mussolino; Denis Filimonov; Florian Karbaum; Jörn Schubert
- Past members: Dirk Schlächter; Mirko Gluschke; Nina Jiers; Thorsten Harnitz; Ole Buuck; Tom Lutschke; Nino Helfrich
- Website: neopera.com

Neopera is a German band which combines symphonic metal music with light electronic music, operatic vocals and death growls. The band was formed in 2011 in Hamburg.

== History ==
Jörn Schubert always wanted to combine heavy metal music with classical music. For this purpose, he sought suitable musicians, eventually finding the soprano Nina Jiers and the baritone Thorsten Schuck. At that time, Jiers had no experience with metal. Mirko Gluschke, who is a good friend of Schubert, became the growling vocalist. Dirk Schlächter became the band's bass guitarist. In addition, during the recording of the demo, Corvin Bahn, André Schumann and Guiomar Espineira helped, to release the first demo, "Destined Ways" in mid-2011, in collaboration with the producer Elke Freese.

On 29 May 2012, Schubert signed a contract with the record company earMUSIC which asked him to record an entire album. The recordings for the album Destined Ways began in June 2012 and were finished in November 2012. It was released in Germany on 29 August 2014 and internationally on 18 July 2014. The two-year time gap between the completion of the album and its release was explained by the search for a suitable sample space and new members. Schumann and Espineira were only intended for the studio recordings, and Bahn was not available at that time for live performances. Therefore, the band searched for new live musicians. Eventually, Mikis Trimborn became the second guitarist, while Thorsten Harnitz became the drummer.

On 1 August 2014, Neopera made their second appearance at Wacken Open Air.

This was followed by a long break for health reasons.

In 2020, the band released the EP In Memoriam (which was produced back in 2015). Their new single "An Eternal Night" marked their comeback.

During the recording of "Destined Ways", Schubert fell ill with muscular dystonia in his left hand and from then on could only make music to a very limited extent. He took the title of the debut album "Destined Ways" literally and tackled the path that had been predetermined for him with a firm step. After years of therapy, the path with Neopera continues. Schubert will no longer be seen on stage. As a composer, however, he is more active than ever.

He follows the predetermined path together with Schuck, who has accompanied him since the beginning of Neopera, and a complete new line-up: Jasmin Gajewski (soprano singer), Nino Helfrich (guitarist), and Denis Filimonov (bassist and growler).

"Neopera combines metal with elements of classical music. Dominant guitars, shouts and driving rhythms combine with classical singing and orchestral arrangements. Everything, of course, in harmony with the texts, which immerse the listener in various stories. – Jörn Schubert"

== Discography ==
Studio albums

- 2014: Destined Ways
- 2025: Eternal Source

Singles and EPs

- 2013: The Marvel of Chimera
- 2020: In Memoriam
- 2021: An Eternal Night
- 2021: Verge of War
- 2022: Tuba Mirum

Music videos

- 2013: "The Marvel of Chimera"
- 2014: "Destined Ways"
- 2014: "Error"
- 2021: "An Eternal Night"
- 2021: "Verge of War"
- 2022: "Tuba Mirum"
- 2022: "Side by Side"
- 2022: "A New God"

== Line-up ==
Current members

- Jasmin Gajewski – soprano vocals
- Wiebke Krull – soprano vocals
- Thorsten Schuck – baritone vocals
- Dawid Wieczorek – guitar
- Vincenzo Vic M. Mussolino – guitar
- Denis Filimonov – bass/growled vocals
- Florian Karbaum – drums
- Jörn Schubert – composer and founder

Previous members

- Dirk Schlächter — bass guitar
- Mirko Gluschke — growled vocals
- Nina Jiers — soprano vocals
- Thorsten Harnitz — drums
- Ole Buuck — drums
- Tom Lutschke — guitar
- Nino Helfrich – guitar

Guest/session members

- André Schumann – drums
- Corvin Bahn – keyboards, orchestrations
- Guiomar Espineira – western concert flute
- Mikis Trimborn – guitars
