= To the Metal! =

Studio album by Gamma Ray
- Released: 29 January 2010
- Recorded: at High Gain Studio, Hamburg, Germany
- Genre: Power metal
- Length: 48:22
- Label: earMUSIC
- Producers: Dirk Schlächter and Kai Hansen

Gamma Ray chronology
| Land of the Free II (2007) | To the Metal! (2010) | Skeletons & Majesties Live (2012) |

To the Metal! is the tenth full-length studio album by Gamma Ray. It was released on 29 January 2010. To promote the album, the band did a tour with Freedom Call and Secret Sphere. The album was recorded in Kai's own studio in Hamburg in autumn 2009. The band has recorded 12 songs. Ten of them were featured on the regular album release, while the other two were bonus tracks appearing on the different editions of the album. The band described some of the songs on the official website, revealing that there would be a full-throttle number called "Rise", a rhythmic and melodically diverse song called "Time To Live", and a multilayered anthem titled "All you need to know", featuring ex-Helloween frontman Michael Kiske. Other songs mentioned are "No Need to Cry", a song written by Dirk Schlächter about the death of his father, "To The Metal", a song they played on various festivals before the album release and the atmospheric and dense "Empathy". It is the last album featuring drummer Dan Zimmermann.

== Track listing ==
| No. | Title | Writer(s) | Length |
|---|---|---|---|
| 1. | "Empathy" | Hansen | 5:04 |
| 2. | "All You Need to Know" (featuring Michael Kiske) | Hansen | 4:00 |
| 3. | "Time to Live" | Richter | 4:48 |
| 4. | "To the Metal" | Hansen | 5:29 |
| 5. | "Rise" | Zimmermann | 5:05 |
| 6. | "Mother Angel" | Hansen | 5:20 |
| 7. | "Shine Forever" | Schlächter | 3:53 |
| 8. | "Deadlands" | Hansen | 4:23 |
| 9. | "Chasing Shadows" | Richter | 4:23 |
| 10. | "No Need to Cry" | Schlächter | 5:56 |

Bonus tracks on Japanese pressing and Collector's Edition
| No. | Title | Writer(s) | Length |
|---|---|---|---|
| 11. | "One Life" | Hansen | 5:07 |
| 12. | "Wannabees" | Zimmermann | 3:48 |

== Album versions ==
1. Regular jewel case CD
2. Limited edition featuring an additional Bonus DVD (including the making-of and interview with Kai Hansen)
3. Red vinyl in gatefold packaging
4. Collectors' edition featuring CD and 7" vinyl with 2 bonus tracks, completely hand-signed

== Critical reception ==
Professional ratings
Review scores
| Source | Rating |
|---|---|
| Allmusic | 4/5 stars |
| Gears of Rock | 3.5/5 stars |
| BurnYourHears | 8.5/10 stars |
| BW&BK | 8/10 stars |

The critical reception to this album has been mostly positive, with some critics praising the musicianship and the drumming in particular. Others have praised the band for their consistency and for remaining 'one of heavy metal's most unsung heroes'.

== Personnel ==
- Kai Hansen - lead vocals, guitar
- Henjo Richter - guitar, keyboards
- Dirk Schlächter - bass, lead vocals (10)
- Dan Zimmermann - drums

Guest musician

- Michael Kiske - lead vocals (2)

=== Technical personnel ===
- Dirk Schlächter, Kai Hansen — production and engineering
- Hervé Monjeaud — cover painting

== Charts ==
| Chart (2010) | Peak position |
|---|---|
| Belgian Albums (Ultratop Wallonia) | 94 |
| Finnish Albums (Suomen virallinen lista) | 31 |
| French Albums (SNEP) | 96 |
| German Albums (Offizielle Top 100) | 24 |
| Greek Albums (IFPI) | 2 |
| Italian Albums (FIMI) | 59 |
| Japanese Albums (Oricon) | 31 |
| Swedish Albums (Sverigetopplistan) | 25 |
| Swiss Albums (Schweizer Hitparade) | 55 |
| UK Rock & Metal Albums (Official Charts) | 36 |
