= Henjo Richter =

German guitarist

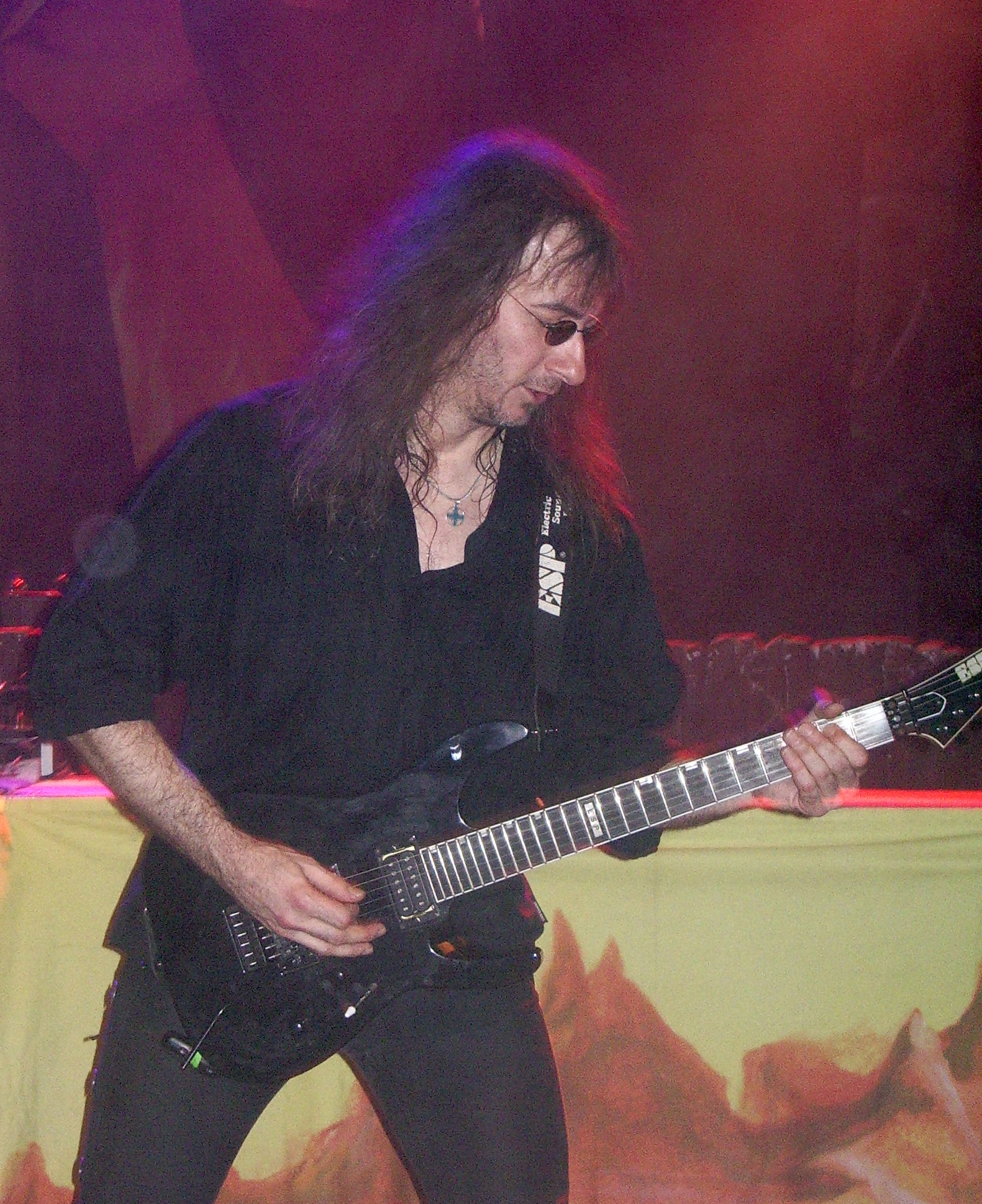
- Richter performing in 2008

Background information
- Birth name: Henjo Oliver Richter
- Born: 24 November 1963 (age 61); Hamburg, West Germany
- Genres: Power metal, heavy metal
- Occupation(s): Musician, songwriter
- Instrument(s): Guitar, keyboards
- Years active: 1980–present
- Member of: Gamma Ray, The Unity
- Formerly of: Avantasia, Rampage

Henjo Oliver Richter (born 24 November 1963) is a German guitarist and keyboardist best known as a member of the power metal band Gamma Ray.

== Biography ==
Richter is a self-taught musician and started playing at the age of 13. He is a veteran of the German heavy metal scene, but Gamma Ray is his first major band. He joined them as a replacement for guitarist Dirk Schlächter (who had switched instrument to bass) on Somewhere Out in Space (1997). However, in the mid-1980s, Henjo was a member of the heavy metal band Rampage, replacing Roland Grapow. Coincidentally, Michael Weikath considered Richter to join Helloween. Had this happened, he would have replaced Grapow just like he did in Rampage.

In 2001, Richter was hired by Tobias Sammet to be the guitarist of his metal opera project Avantasia.

In 2005, Richter was forced to miss part of Gamma Ray's tour for their album Majestic after injuring himself falling down a set of stairs on the ferry going between Sweden and Finland. In March 2010, Kasperi Heikkinen replaced Richter for shows in Germany and Czech Republic because Henjo was hospitalized on 16 March 2010 due to retinal detachment.

In 2017, it was announced on Gamma Ray's website that the debut album of The Unity, which Richter founded together with Michael Ehré, was to be released in spring 2017.

== Discography ==
=== With Rampage ===
- Love Lights Up the Night (1983)

=== With Gamma Ray ===
- Somewhere Out in Space (1997)
- Power Plant (1999)
- Blast from the Past (compilation album) (2000)
- No World Order (2001)
- Skeletons in the Closet (live album) (2003)
- Majestic (2005)
- Land of the Free II (2007)
- Hell Yeah! The Awesome Foursome (live album) (2008)
- To the Metal (2010)
- Skeletons & Majesties (EP) (2011)
- Skeletons & Majesties Live (live album) (2012)
- Empire of the Undead (2014)
- The Best (Of) (compilation album) (2015)

=== With Avantasia ===
- The Metal Opera (2000)
- The Metal Opera Part II (2002)

=== With The Unity ===
- The Unity (2017)
- Rise (2018)

=== As a guest ===
- Freedom Call – Taragon (EP) (1999)
- Avantasia – The Scarecrow (2008)
- Avantasia – Angel of Babylon (2010)
- Avantasia – The Flying Opera (live album) (2011)
- War Kabinett – Made in Mexico (2011)
- Neopera – Destined Ways (2014)
