= Insanity and Genius =

Studio album by Gamma Ray
- Released: 28 June 1993
- Recorded: March–May 1993
- Studio: Hansen Studios, Hamburg, Germany
- Genre: Power metal
- Length: 56:27
- Label: Noise
- Producer: Kai Hansen, Dirk Schlächter, Karl-Ulrich Walterbach

Gamma Ray chronology
Sigh No More (1991)	Insanity and Genius (1993)	Land of the Free (1995)

Professional ratings
Review scores
Source	Rating
AllMusic	4/5 stars
Classic Rock	6/10 stars
Collector's Guide to Heavy Metal	8/10

Insanity and Genius is the third studio album by German power metal band Gamma Ray and their final album with Ralf Scheepers on vocals. Additionally, Kai Hansen sings on the song "Heal Me" and Dirk Schlächter on "Your Tørn Is Over".^{[d]} Continuing a trend that would conclude with their fifth studio release, the lineup for the album was changed from the previous one, with Jan Rubach replacing Uwe Wessel on bass and Thomas Nack replacing Uli Kusch on drums.

The album was re-released in 2002 with additional tracks. The 2002 version was released again in 2010 by Cooking Vinyl Records as part of a 2-CD set with the 2002 version of Land of the Free.

== Track listing ==
No.	Title	Lyrics	Music	Length
1.	"Tribute to the Past"	Kai Hansen	Hansen, Jan Rubach	5:04
2.	"No Return"	Hansen	Hansen	4:06
3.	"Last Before the Storm"	Hansen	Hansen	4:29
4.	"The Cave Principle"	Hansen	Hansen	6:51
5.	"Future Madhouse"	Hansen, Ralf Scheepers	Hansen	4:07
6.	"Gamma Ray" (Birth Control cover)	Bruno Frenzel	Frenzel	5:20
7.	"Insanity and Genius"	Thomas Nack	Rubach	4:30
8.	"18 Years"	Scheepers	Dirk Schlächter, Scheepers	5:23
9.	"Your Tørn Is Over^{[d]}"	Schlächter	Schlächter	3:53
10.	"Heal Me"	Hansen, Schlächter	Schlächter	7:32
11.	"Brothers"	Hansen, Scheepers	Hansen, Scheepers, Schlächter	5:15

Japanese Edition bonus track
No.	Title	Lyrics	Music	Length
12.	"Heroes^{[a]}"	Hansen, Scheepers	Hansen, Scheepers, Schlächter	4:59

2002 release bonus tracks
No.	Title	Lyrics	Music	Length
12.	"Gamma Ray^{[b]}" (extended version Birth Control cover)	Frenzel	Frenzel	7:26
13.	"Exciter^{[c]}" (Judas Priest cover)	Rob Halford, Glenn Tipton	Halford, Tipton	5:01
14.	"Save Us" (live)	Hansen	Hansen	5:41

^a "Heroes" also appears on the 2002 re-release of Gamma Ray's 1991 album Sigh No More and is an alternative version of the song "Changes" from that album.
^b "Gamma Ray (extended version)" also appears on the Future Madhouse EP.
^c "Exciter" also appears on A Tribute to Judas Priest, Vol. 2: Delivering the Goods.
^d "Your Tørn Is Over" is referred to as "Your Turn Is Over" on the cover and in the booklet of the 2010 Cooking Vinyl Records 2CD joint-release of Insanity and Genius and Land of the Free (2002 re-release versions)

=== Anniversary Edition bonus disc ===
No.	Title	Length
1.	"Valley of the Kings" (live at Chameleon Studios 2016)	3:46
2.	"Heaven Can Wait" (live at Chameleon Studios 2016)	4:49
3.	"Gamma Ray^{[b]}" (extended version)	7:25
4.	"Money" (demo)	3:45
5.	"Silence" (live)	6:30
6.	"Sail On" (live)	4:29
7.	"Space Eater" (rough mix Horus Studio)	4:33
8.	"Exciter^{[c]}"	5:01
Total length:		40:18

== Personnel ==
Gamma Ray

- Ralf Scheepers – lead vocals (all but tracks 9 and 10)
- Kai Hansen – guitar, lead vocals on track 10, producer, engineer
- Dirk Schlächter – guitar, keyboards, lead vocals on track 9, producer, engineer
- Jan Rubach – bass guitar
- Thomas Nack – drums

Additional musicians

- Sascha Paeth – computer engineering and additional keyboards

Production

- Charlie Bauerfeind – mixing at Horus Sound Studio, Hannover
- Achim Krause – mastering
- Karl-Ulrich Walterbach – executive producer

== Charts ==
Chart (1993)	Peak position
German Albums (Offizielle Top 100)	93
Japanese Albums (Oricon)	9
