= Majestic (Gamma Ray album) =

Studio album by Gamma Ray
- Released: 11 October 2005
- Recorded: at Hansen Studio, Hamburg, Germany
- Genres: Speed metal; power metal
- Length: 58:26
- Label: Sanctuary Records
- Producers: Dirk Schlächter and Kai Hansen

Gamma Ray chronology
No World Order (2001)	Majestic (2005)	Land of the Free II (2007)

Professional ratings
Review scores
Source	Rating
Allmusic	4/5 stars
Sputnikmusic	(4.5/5)

Majestic is the eighth full-length studio album from the German power metal band Gamma Ray, released in 2005. The band also released an LP version through their website to complement the supporting tour, limited to 1500 copies worldwide.

Guitarist Henjo Ritcher was injured during the Majestic tour from falling down a flight of stairs on a ferry between Sweden and Finland. He was forced to sit out on half the tour due to his injury.

The song "Blood Religion", with lyrics about vampires, became a trademark song of Gamma Ray, with fans in concert chanting some of the main chorus lines during the song similar to how fans recited the main chorus to "Future World", a Helloween song.

== Track listing ==
No.	Title	Lyrics	Music	Length
1.	"My Temple"	Kai Hansen	Hansen	4:57
2.	"Fight"	Henjo Richter	Richter	3:24
3.	"Strange World"	Hansen	Hansen	5:03
4.	"Hell Is Thy Home"	Hansen	Hansen	4:46
5.	"Blood Religion"	Hansen	Hansen	6:53
6.	"Condemned to Hell"	Dan Zimmermann	Zimmermann	4:56
7.	"Spiritual Dictator"	Zimmermann	Zimmermann	5:38
8.	"Majesty"	Hansen	Hansen	6:23
9.	"How Long"	Hansen	Hansen	4:06
10.	"Revelation"	Richter	Richter	8:30

=== Japanese Bonus Track ===
No.	Title	Lyrics	Music	Length
11.	"Hellfire"	Zimmermann	Zimmermann	4:37

== Personnel ==
- Kai Hansen – vocals, guitars
- Henjo Richter – guitars, keyboards
- Dirk Schlächter – bass guitar
- Dan Zimmermann – drums

=== Technical personnel ===
- Produced and engineered by: Dirk Schlächter, Kai Hansen
- Mastered at: Finnvox Studios, Helsinki, Finland
- Cover Painting by: Hervé Monjeaud
- Digital Artwork and Booklet Design by: Henjo Richter

== Charts ==
Chart (2005)	Peak position
Finnish Albums (Suomen virallinen lista)	28
French Albums (SNEP)	169
German Albums (Offizielle Top 100)	39
Italian Albums (FIMI)	66
Japanese Albums (Oricon)	37
Spanish Albums (Promusicae)	78
Swedish Albums (Sverigetopplistan)	20
