= Somewhere Out in Space =

Studio album by Gamma Ray
- Released: 25 August 1997
- Recorded: March – June 1997
- Studio: Hansen Studio, Hamburg, Germany
- Genre: Speed metal; power metal
- Length: 57:16
- Label: Noise
- Producer: Kai Hansen & Dirk Schlächter

Gamma Ray chronology
Land of the Free (1995)	Somewhere Out in Space (1997)	Power Plant (1999)

Professional ratings
Review scores
Source	Rating
AllMusic	4/5 stars
Collector's Guide to Heavy Metal	8/10
Sputnikmusic	5.0/5

Somewhere Out in Space is an album by German power metal band, Gamma Ray. It was released on 25 August 1997 and is the band's fifth studio album. Continuing in the tradition of the previous four albums, it contained yet another different lineup, but would also be the first album to feature the band's longest standing lineup. The album featured Dirk Schlächter on bass for the first time since his guest appearance on Heading for Tomorrow, Henjo Richter on guitar and Dan Zimmermann on drums.

The track "Watcher in the Sky" was recorded by Iron Savior and appears on their self-titled 1997 album. It features Piet Sielck on guitar and additional vocals, and Thomen Stauch on drums.

The track "No Stranger (Another Day in Life)" was originally written as a contribution to Michael Kiske's solo album, but since Kiske rejected it as "too heavy" Hansen instead decided to record it with Gamma Ray.

"Miracle" is effectively a stylized version of "Man on a Mission" from Land of the Free, Gamma Ray's previous album. It has very similar lyrics, an identical chorus, and similar chord progressions, but at a slower tempo.

The song "Men, Martians and Machines" begins with the "five tones" from the 1977 film Close Encounters of the Third Kind played on strings.

== Lyrical concepts ==
- "Beyond the Black Hole" is about travelling the unknown space to discover black holes.
- "Somewhere Out in Space" is about the science fiction franchise Star Trek.
- "The Landing" and "Valley of the Kings" are about the arrival of aliens on Earth millions of years ago.
- "Pray" is about the end of hope for the human race to be saved from extinction.
- "Shine On" is about the theory that extraterrestrial life visited Earth long before and planted the seeds of mankind.

== Track listing ==
All lyrics are written by Kai Hansen, except where noted.

No.	Title	Lyrics	Music	Length
1.	"Beyond the Black Hole"		Hansen, Dirk Schlächter, Dan Zimmermann	6:00
2.	"Men, Martians and Machines"		Hansen	3:52
3.	"No Stranger (Another Day in Life)"		Hansen	3:35
4.	"Somewhere Out in Space"		Hansen	5:27
5.	"The Guardians of Mankind"	Henjo Richter	Richter	5:01
6.	"The Landing"		Schlächter	1:16
7.	"Valley of the Kings"		Hansen	3:51
8.	"Pray"		Schlächter	4:45
9.	"The Winged Horse"	Richter	Richter	7:02
10.	"Cosmic Chaos" (instrumental)		Zimmermann	0:48
11.	"Lost in the Future"		Schlächter	3:40
12.	"Watcher in the Sky"	Hansen, Piet Sielck	Hansen, Sielck	5:19
13.	"Rising Star" (instrumental)		Schlächter	0:51
14.	"Shine On"		Schlächter	6:52

Japanese Edition bonus track
No.	Title	Lyrics	Music	Length
15.	"Return to Fantasy" (Uriah Heep cover)	David Byron, Ken Hensley	Byron, Hensley	5:16

2003 release bonus tracks
No.	Title	Lyrics	Music	Length
15.	"Return to Fantasy" (Uriah Heep cover)	Byron, Hensley	Byron, Hensley	5:16
16.	"Miracle"	Hansen	Hansen	7:17
17.	"Victim of Changes" (Judas Priest cover)	Al Atkins, K.K. Downing, Rob Halford, Glenn Tipton	Atkins, Downing, Halford, Tipton	7:23

- "Miracle" also appears on the Silent Miracles EP.
- "Victim of Changes" also appears on the Valley of the Kings EP.

== Credits ==
Gamma Ray

- Kai Hansen – vocals, guitars, producer, engineer, mixing on tracks 4, 7, 9
- Henjo Richter – guitars, keyboards
- Dirk Schlächter – bass, guitar, producer, engineer, mixing on tracks 4, 7, 9
- Dan Zimmermann – drums

Guest musicians

- Piet Sielck – vocals and guitars on track 12
- Thomen Stauch – drums on track 12

Production

- Charlie Bauerfeind – mixing
- Ralf Lindner – mastering

== Charts ==
Chart (1997)	Peak position
Finnish Albums (Suomen virallinen lista)	17
German Albums (Offizielle Top 100)	39
Japanese Albums (Oricon)	22
Swedish Albums (Sverigetopplistan)	59
