= Land of the Free II =

Studio album by Gamma Ray
- Released: 19 November 2007
- Recorded: 2006–2007, at High Gain Studio, Hamburg, Germany
- Genre: Power metal
- Length: 65:18
- Label: Steamhammer/SPV
- Producers: Dirk Schlächter and Kai Hansen

Gamma Ray chronology
| Majestic (2005) | Land of the Free II (2007) | To the Metal! (2010) |

Professional ratings
Review scores
| Source | Rating |
|---|---|
| About.com | link |
| Allmusic | link |
| Jukebox:Metal | link |
| Lords of Metal | (8.8/10) link |
| Metal Glory | link |

Land of the Free II is the ninth full-length studio album by Gamma Ray. It was released 19 November in Europe, 21 November in Japan and January 15, 2008 for North America. To promote Land of the Free II, Gamma Ray joined Helloween on the 2007/08 Hellish Rock Tour. The song "Into the Storm" is available on the band's MySpace page and its music video on YouTube.

The first-edition CD, released as a Digipak, was limited to 30,000 copies.

== Track listing ==
| No. | Title | Lyrics | Music | Length |
|---|---|---|---|---|
| 1. | "Into the Storm" | Kai Hansen | Hansen | 3:47 |
| 2. | "From the Ashes" | Hansen | Hansen | 5:26 |
| 3. | "Rising Again" | Hansen | Hansen | 0:27 |
| 4. | "To Mother Earth" | Hansen | Hansen | 5:11 |
| 5. | "Rain" | Henjo Richter | Richter | 5:16 |
| 6. | "Leaving Hell" | Hansen | Hansen | 4:20 |
| 7. | "Empress" | Dan Zimmermann | Zimmermann | 6:22 |
| 8. | "When the World" | Hansen | Hansen | 5:44 |
| 9. | "Opportunity" | Dirk Schlächter | Schlächter | 7:14 |
| 10. | "Real World" | Hansen | Hansen | 5:42 |
| 11. | "Hear Me Calling" | Richter | Richter | 4:14 |
| 12. | "Insurrection" | Hansen | Hansen | 11:33 |

=== Japanese Bonus Track ===
| No. | Title | Lyrics | Music | Length |
|---|---|---|---|---|
| 13. | "Blood Religion" (Live in Montréal) | Hansen | Hansen | 8:11 |

== Personnel ==
- Kai Hansen - Vocals, guitars
- Henjo Richter - Guitars, keyboards
- Dirk Schlächter - Bass
- Dan Zimmermann - Drums

=== Technical personnel ===
- Produced and engineered by: Dirk Schlächter, Kai Hansen
- Mixed by: Tommy Newton at Area 51 Studio, Celle, Germany
- Cover Painting by: Hervé Monjeaud
- Booklet Graphics and Layout by: Dirk Illing

== Charts ==
| Chart (2007) | Peak position |
|---|---|
| French Albums (SNEP) | 194 |
| German Albums (Offizielle Top 100) | 54 |
| Japanese Albums (Oricon) | 30 |
| Swedish Albums (Sverigetopplistan) | 57 |
