= Dan Zimmermann =

German rock drummer (born 1966)

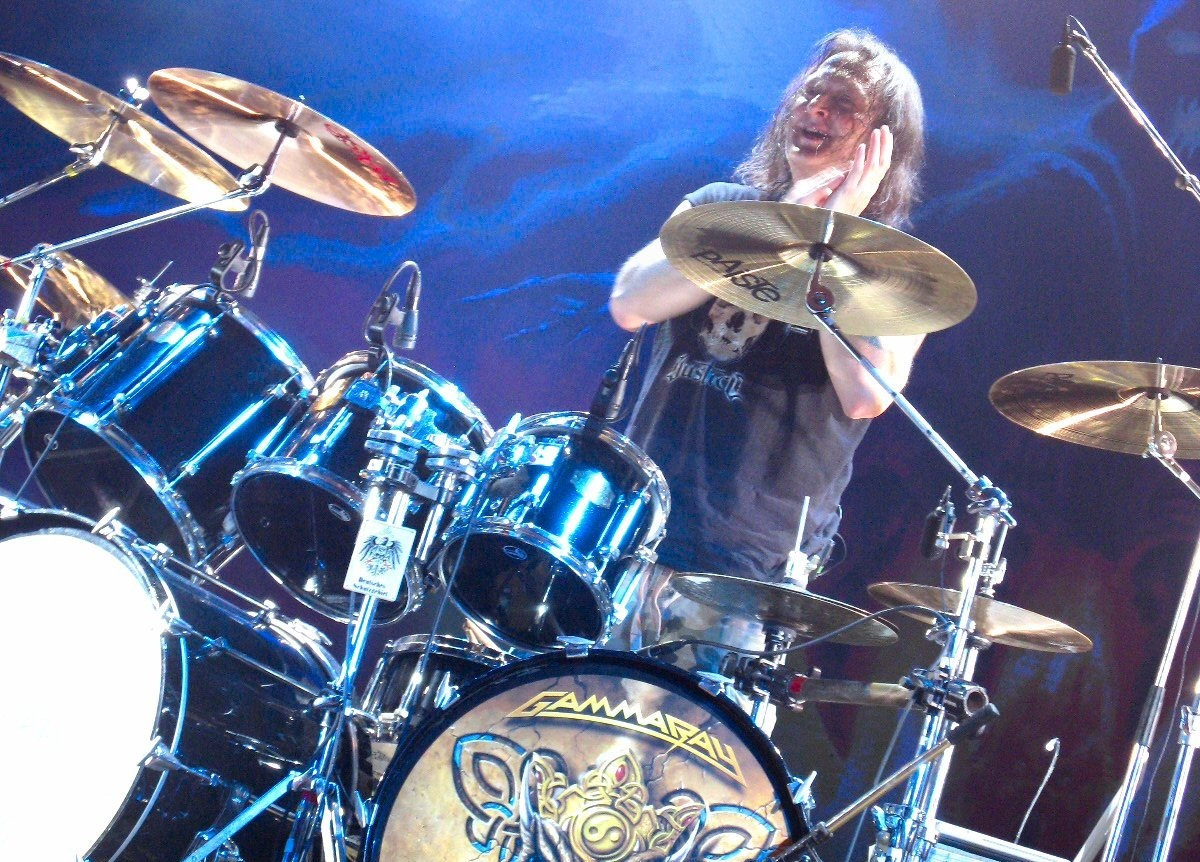
- Dan Zimmermann during a concert in 2010

Background information
- Born: Daniel Hans Erwin Zimmermann; 30 October 1966 (age 59); Nürnberg, West Germany
- Genres: Power metal, heavy metal
- Occupations: Musician and songwriter
- Instrument: Drums
- Years active: 1993–2012
- Formerly of: Gamma Ray; Freedom Call; Iron Savior

Daniel Hans Erwin Zimmermann (born 30 October 1966 in Nürnberg, West Germany) is a retired German heavy metal drummer. He is best known as having been the drummer of German power metal bands Gamma Ray and Freedom Call. He was a founding member of Freedom Call, from which he departed in 2010. Two years later he also left Gamma Ray, announcing a retirement from the music business in 2012.

Freedom Call celebrated their 20th anniversary and release of M.E.T.A.L, their tenth studio album, on tour. The new album featured a reprise of Zimmermann's drumming on the title song.

== Discography ==
=== With Gamma Ray ===
- Valley of the Kings (1997)
- Somewhere Out In Space (1997)
- The Karaoke Album (1997) - Karaoke Compilation album
- Power Plant (1999)
- Blast from the Past (2000) - "Best of" Compilation album
- No World Order (2001)
- Skeletons in the Closet (2003)
- Majestic (2005)
- Land of the Free II (2007)
- Hell Yeah! The Awesome Foursome (2008)
- To The Metal (2010)
- Skeletons & Majesties (EP) (2011)
- Skeletons & Majesties Live (2012)
- The Best (Of) (2015)

=== With Freedom Call ===
- Stairway To Fairyland (1999)
- Taragon EP (1999)
- Crystal Empire (2001)
- Eternity (2002)
- Live Invasion (2004)
- The Circle of Life (2005)
- Dimensions (2007)
- Legend of the Shadowking (2010)
- Ages of Light 1998-2013 (2013)

=== With Lanzer ===
- Under A Different Sun (1995)

=== With Hirsch und Palatzky ===
- Saitenfeue (1997)

=== With Lenny Wolf ===
- Lenny Wolf (1999)

=== With Iron Savior ===
- Coming Home (single) (1998)
- Unification (1999)
