= Power Plant (Gamma Ray album) =

- Cover art by Derek Riggs

Studio album by Gamma Ray
- Released: 29 March 1999
- Recorded: November 1998 – January 1999
- Studio: Hansen Studio, Hamburg, Germany
- Genre: Speed metal; power metal
- Length: 63:32
- Label: Noise
- Producer: Kai Hansen, Dirk Schlächter and Gamma Ray

Gamma Ray chronology
Somewhere Out in Space (1997)	Power Plant (1999)	No World Order (2001)

Professional ratings
Review scores
Source	Rating
AllMusic	3/5 stars
Collector's Guide to Heavy Metal	8/10
Metal Storm	8.5/10
Sputnikmusic	3.5/5

Power Plant is the sixth full-length album from the German power metal band, Gamma Ray. The album was initially released in 1999, but was re-released along with most of the band's past catalogue in 2002 with bonus tracks and new covers. This album has a tight focus on the power metal genre.

Most notably for the band, it was the first album in which the lineup from one album to the next remained unchanged, with Kai Hansen on vocals and guitar, Henjo Richter on guitar, Dirk Schlächter on bass and Dan Zimmermann on drums.

The cover painting and illustrations are by Derek Riggs, creator of Iron Maiden's Eddie mascot.

== Track listing ==
No.	Title	Lyrics	Music	Length
1.	"Anywhere in the Galaxy"	Kai Hansen	Hansen	6:37
2.	"Razorblade Sigh"	Hansen	Hansen	5:01
3.	"Send Me a Sign"	Henjo Richter	Richter	4:07
4.	"Strangers in the Night"	Hansen, Dan Zimmermann	Zimmermann	6:04
5.	"Gardens of the Sinner"	Zimmermann, Hansen	Zimmermann, Hansen	5:57
6.	"Short as Hell"	Hansen	Hansen	3:57
7.	"It's a Sin" (Pet Shop Boys cover)	Chris Lowe, Neil Tennant	Lowe, Tennant	4:58
8.	"Heavy Metal Universe"	Hansen	Hansen	5:25
9.	"Wings of Destiny"	Richter	Richter	6:26
10.	"Hand of Fate"	Hansen, Dirk Schlächter	Schlächter	6:12
11.	"Armageddon"	Hansen	Hansen	8:48

Japanese Edition bonus track
No.	Title	Lyrics	Music	Length
12.	"Long Live Rock 'n' Roll" (Rainbow cover)	Ritchie Blackmore, Ronnie James Dio	Blackmore, Dio	3:46

2002 release bonus tracks
No.	Title	Lyrics	Music	Length
12.	"A While in Dreamland"	Hansen, Schlächter	Hansen, Schlächter	4:16
13.	"Rich and Famous"	Hansen	Hansen	4:53
14.	"Long Live Rock 'n' Roll" (Rainbow cover)	Blackmore, Dio	Blackmore, Dio	3:46

- "A While in Dreamland" also appears on the Silent Miracles EP.
- "Rich and Famous" also appears on the Japanese version of Blast from the Past.

== Personnel ==
Gamma Ray

- Kai Hansen – vocals, guitars, producer, engineer, mixing
- Henjo Richter – guitars, keyboards, artwork and booklet design
- Dirk Schlächter – bass, producer, engineer, mixing
- Dan Zimmermann – drums

Additional musicians

- Piet Sielck – additional chorus on "Hand of Fate"

Production

- Ralf Lindner – mastering at .Ham. Audio, Hamburg

== Charts ==
Chart (1999)	Peak position
Austrian Albums (Ö3 Austria)	45
Finnish Albums (Suomen virallinen lista)	32
German Albums (Offizielle Top 100)	25
Japanese Albums (Oricon)	31
Swedish Albums (Sverigetopplistan)	51
