= No World Order (Gamma Ray album) =

Studio album by Gamma Ray
- Released: 10 September 2001
- Recorded: April–July 2001, Hansen Studio, Hamburg, Germany
- Genres: Speed metal; power metal
- Length: 52:00
- Label: Sanctuary
- Producers: Dirk Schlächter and Kai Hansen

Gamma Ray chronology
Power Plant (1999)	No World Order (2001)	Majestic (2005)

Professional ratings
Review scores
Source	Rating
Allmusic	4/5 stars
Metal Storm	(9.8/10)
Lords of Metal	(8.8/10)
Sputnikmusic	4.5/5 stars

No World Order is the seventh full-length album by the German power metal band Gamma Ray released in 2001. A music video was made for the song "Eagle".

== Track listing ==
All tracks are written by Kai Hansen, except where noted.

No.	Title	Length
1.	"Induction"	1:01
2.	"Dethrone Tyranny" (Zimmermann)	4:14
3.	"The Heart of the Unicorn"	4:46
4.	"Heaven or Hell"	4:16
5.	"New World Order"	5:01
6.	"Damn the Machine" (Zimmermann)	5:04
7.	"Solid"	4:23
8.	"Fire Below"	5:34
9.	"Follow Me" (Richter)	4:43
10.	"Eagle"	6:06
11.	"Lake of Tears" (Richter)	6:48

Japanese edition bonus track
No.	Title	Length
12.	"Trouble" (Richter)	5:19

== Personnel ==
- Kai Hansen - vocals, electric guitars
- Henjo Richter - electric and acoustic guitars, keyboards
- Dirk Schlächter - bass
- Dan Zimmermann - drums

=== Production ===
- Mixed at: Hansen Studio, Hamburg, Germany
- Engineered by: Dirk Schlächter, Kai Hansen

== Charts ==
Chart (2001)	Peak position
Finnish Albums (Suomen virallinen lista)	19
French Albums (SNEP)	70
German Albums (Offizielle Top 100)	23
Italian Albums (FIMI)	44
Japanese Albums (Oricon)	13
Swedish Albums (Sverigetopplistan)	27

== Credits ==
- Cover Painting by: Hervé Monjeaud
- Digital Artwork and Booklet-design by: Henjo Richter
