= Sigh No More (Gamma Ray album) =

Studio album by Gamma Ray
- Released: 21 September 1991
- Recorded: May – July 1991
- Studio: Karo Studios, Brackel, Germany
- Genre: Power metal
- Length: 46:57
- Label: Noise
- Producer: Tommy Newton, Karl-Ulrich Walterbach

Gamma Ray chronology
Heading for Tomorrow (1990)	Sigh No More (1991)	Insanity and Genius (1993)

Professional ratings
Review scores
Source	Rating
AllMusic	2.5/5 stars
Classic Rock	7/10 stars
Collector's Guide to Heavy Metal	9/10
Sputnikmusic	4.0/5

Sigh No More is the second studio album released by German power metal band, Gamma Ray in 1991 by Noise Records. Beginning a trend that would continue until their fifth studio release, the band's lineup changed from the previous album, with Uli Kusch replacing Mathias Burchardt on drums and Dirk Schlächter officially joining the band on guitars.

== Track listings ==
No.	Title	Lyrics	Music	Length
1.	"Changes"	Kai Hansen, Uwe Wessel	Dirk Schlächter, Hansen, Ralf Scheepers, Wessel	5:43
2.	"Rich and Famous"	Hansen	Hansen	4:38
3.	"As Time Goes By"	Hansen, Piet Sielck	Hansen, Sielck	4:41
4.	"(We Won't) Stop the War"	Hansen, Wessel	Hansen, Wessel	3:47
5.	"Father and Son"	Schlächter, Scheepers	Schlächter	4:25
6.	"One with the World"	Hansen	Hansen, Wessel	4:47
7.	"Start Running"	Scheepers	Wessel	3:56
8.	"Countdown^{[a]}"	Hansen	Hansen	4:15
9.	"Dream Healer"	Hansen, Scheepers	Hansen	6:21
10.	"The Spirit"	Hansen, Scheepers	Hansen, Wessel	4:17

Japanese Edition bonus track
No.	Title	Lyrics	Music	Length
11.	"Sail On" (live)	Hansen	Hansen	5:30

2002 release bonus tracks
No.	Title	Lyrics	Music	Length
11.	"Heroes^{[b]}"	Hansen, Scheepers	Hansen, Scheepers, Schlächter	5:00
12.	"Dream Healer^{[c]}" (pre-production version)	Hansen, Scheepers	Hansen	9:36
13.	"Who Do You Think You Are?^{[d]}"	Hansen	Hansen, Scheepers, Schlächter, Uli Kusch, Wessel	5:06

=== Anniversary Edition bonus disc ===
No.	Title	Length
1.	"One with the World" (live at Wacken 2011)	4:58
2.	"Dream Healer" (live in Montreal 2006)	8:08
3.	"Changes" (Blast from the Past version)	5:28
4.	"Rich and Famous" (Blast from the Past version)	4:54
5.	"One with the World" (Blast from the Past version)	4:50
6.	"Dream Healer" (Blast from the Past version)	7:35
7.	"Heroes" (pre-production version)	4:59
8.	"Dream Healer" (pre-production version)	9:37
9.	"As Times Goes By" (pre-production version – Kai on vocals)	4:58
10.	"(We Won’t) Stop the War" (pre-production version – Kai on vocals)	3:40
11.	"Dream Healer" (demo – Kai on vocals)	5:57
12.	"Rich and Famous" (demo – Kai on vocals)	5:09
Total length:		70:13

^a"Countdown" does not appear on the vinyl or cassette versions of the album.
^b"Heroes" is an alternative version of "Changes" and also appears on the Japanese version of Insanity and Genius.
^c"Dream Healer (pre-production version)" also appears on the Future Madhouse EP.
^d"Who Do You Think You Are?" also appears on the European version of Heaven Can Wait EP and Who Do You Think You Are? EP.

== Personnel ==
Gamma Ray

- Ralf Scheepers – lead vocals
- Kai Hansen – guitar
- Dirk Schlächter – guitar, keyboards
- Uwe Wessel – bass
- Uli Kusch – drums

Additional musicians

- Tommy Newton – keyboards, additional rhythm guitar on track 5, talk box solo on track 8, backing vocals, producer, engineer, mixing
- Piet Sielck – keyboards, backing vocals, second engineer
- Fritz Randow – military snare on track 6
- Rolf Köhler – backing vocals

Production

- Karl-Ulrich Walterbach – executive producer

== Charts ==
Chart (1991)	Peak position
Japanese Albums (Oricon)	12
