= Heading for Tomorrow =

Studio album by Gamma Ray
- Released: 26 February 1990
- Recorded: September 1989 – January 1990
- Studio: Horus Sound Studio, Hannover, Germany
- Genre: Power metal
- Length: 53:59
- Label: Noise
- Producer: Kai Hansen

Gamma Ray chronology
Heading for Tomorrow (1990)	Sigh No More (1991)

Professional ratings
Review scores
Source	Rating
AllMusic	4/5 stars
Classic Rock	7/10 stars
Collector's Guide to Heavy Metal	8/10
Sputnikmusic	3.5/5

Heading for Tomorrow is the first studio album released by German metal band Gamma Ray on 26 February 1990 by Noise Records.

In 1990, a video album, Heading for the East, was released that was recorded during the album tour. In 2002, Heading for Tomorrow was re-released with a different cover as part of the Ultimate Collection box-set. This re-released version of the album has also been released separately from the box-set.

== Track listing ==
All tracks are written by Kai Hansen, except where noted.

No.	Title	Length
1.	"Welcome"	0:57
2.	"Lust for Life"	5:18
3.	"Heaven Can Wait"	4:26
4.	"Space Eater"	4:31
5.	"Money"	3:37
6.	"The Silence"	6:22
7.	"Hold Your Ground"	4:48
8.	"Free Time" (Ralf Scheepers)	4:53
9.	"Heading for Tomorrow"	14:29
10.	"Look at Yourself" (Uriah Heep cover; written by Ken Hensley)	4:43

2002 & 2015 re-release bonus tracks
No.	Title	Length
11.	"Mr. Outlaw" (originally Japanese bonus track; written by Scheepers)	4:08
12.	"Sail On"	4:24
13.	"Lonesome Stranger"	4:58

Anniversary Edition Bonus Disc
No.	Title	Length
1.	"Who Do You Think You Are"	5:07
2.	"Heaven Can Wait" (EP Version)	4:28
3.	"Money" (demo)	3:46
4.	"Sail On" (demo)	3:47
5.	"Heading for Tomorrow" (live)	8:18
6.	"Space Eater" (live)	4:45
7.	"The Silence" (demo)	6:20
8.	"Mr. Outlaw" (instrumental version)	4:11
9.	"Heaven Can Wait" (demo)	4:43
10.	"Heading for Tomorrow" (karaoke version)	14:29
11.	"Space Eater" (karaoke version)	4:27
12.	"Lonesome Stranger" (demo)	4:18

Notes

- "Look at Yourself" only appears on the CD version of the album.
- The three bonus tracks from the 2002-release are also available on the Heaven Can Wait EP.

== Personnel ==
Gamma Ray

- Ralf Scheepers – lead vocals
- Kai Hansen – guitars, vocals, producer
- Uwe Wessel – bass (all tracks but 4 and 5)
- Mathias Burchardt – drums (all tracks but 3)

Guest musicians

- Dirk Schlächter – bass (tracks 4, 5)
- Tommy Newton – guitar solo (track 8), backing vocals, mixing
- Tammo Vollmers – drums (track 3)
- Mischa Gerlach – keyboards, piano
- Piet Sielck – additional keyboards, backing vocals, second engineer
- Joal, Fernando Garcia, Petr Chrastina – backing vocals

Production

- Ralf Krause – engineer, mixing of "Look at Yourself"
- Karl-Ulrich Walterbach – executive producer

== Charts ==
Chart (1990)	Peak position
German Albums (Offizielle Top 100)	31
Japanese Albums (Oricon)	24
Swedish Albums (Sverigetopplistan)	45
Swiss Albums (Schweizer Hitparade)	29
