= Kai Hansen =

German guitarist and singer

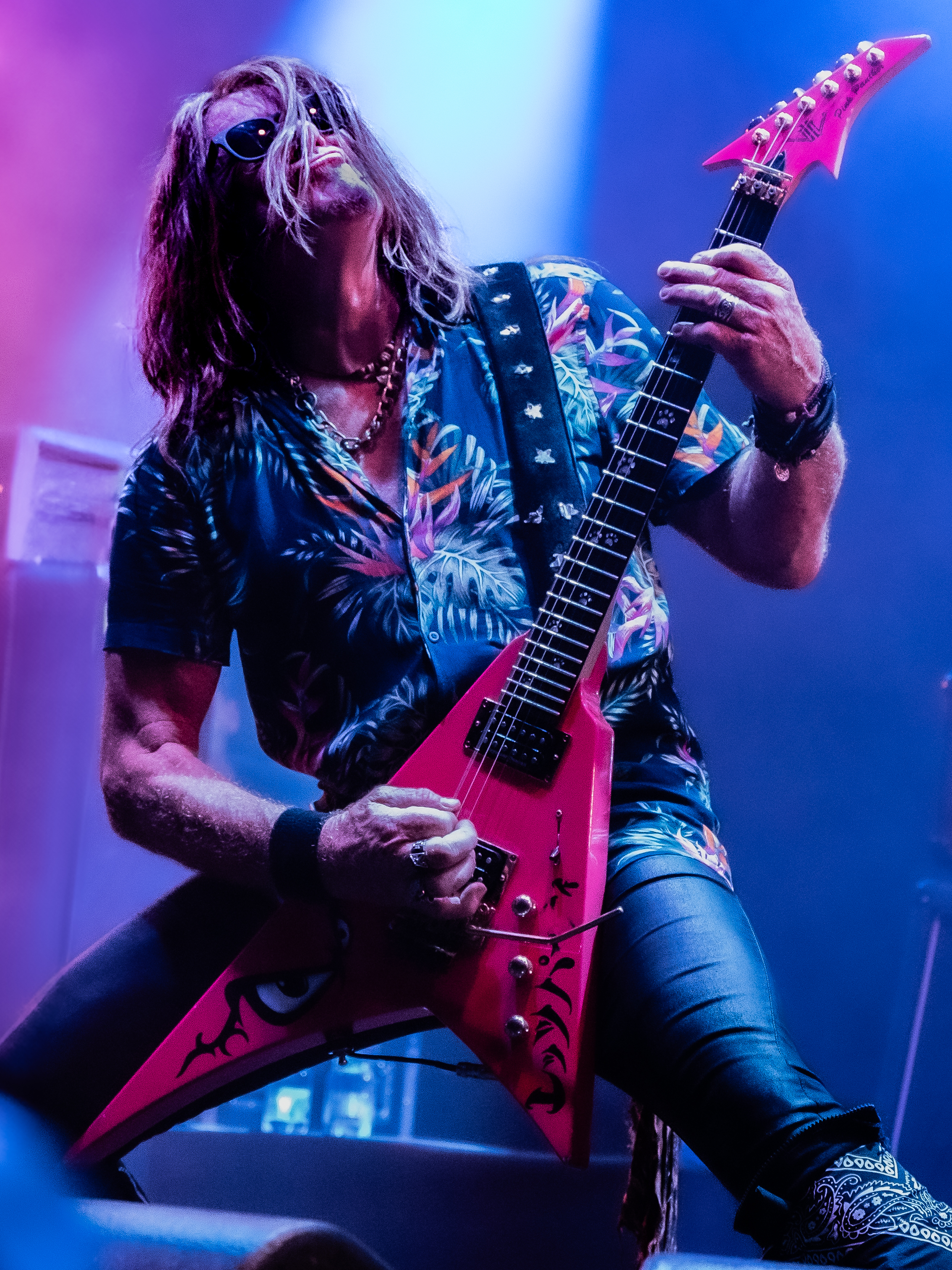
- Hansen performing in July 2024

Background information
- Born: Kai Michael Hansen; 17 January 1963 (age 63); Hamburg, West Germany
- Genres: Power metal; speed metal; heavy metal
- Occupation: Musician
- Instruments: Guitar and vocals
- Years active: 1978–present
- Member of: Helloween; Gamma Ray
- Formerly of: Iron Savior; Unisonic
- Website: facebook.com/kaihansenofficial

Kai Michael Hansen (born 17 January 1963) is a German musician who is the founder, lead guitarist and vocalist of power metal band Gamma Ray. He is also one of the co-founders of another power metal band Helloween, which he was a part of from 1983 to 1989 and rejoined in 2016. He is a prominent figure in power metal and has sold millions of albums worldwide. In 2011, he joined the band Unisonic featuring Helloween vocalist Michael Kiske. Hansen and Kiske reunited with Helloween in 2017 for a world tour with all current members, celebrating the 30-year anniversary of release of the albums Keeper of the Seven Keys Parts I and II.

== Early life ==
Kai Hansen was born in Hamburg in 1963. At the age of ten, Kai developed an interest in music and began to play wash-drums. His parents however, didn't like the noise and bought him an acoustic guitar instead. He took a six-months course in classical guitar and following it, formed his first band with his classmates after he bought an electric guitar, a white Ibanez Les Paul.

== Career ==
Hansen's musical career started in 1978 in a band called Gentry, alongside Iron Savior's co-founder and producer Piet Sielck. In 1983, he and Michael Weikath founded Helloween, where he was guitarist and singer until Michael Kiske took over the microphone for the albums Keeper of the Seven Keys: Part I and Keeper of the Seven Keys: Part II. Hansen left the band on 1 January 1989, citing exhaustion from touring, also frustrated that the band wouldn't reschedule dates in spite of his two-month hospitalization for hepatitis B, and then went on to form his own power metal band Gamma Ray. Hansen also joined Iron Savior as guitarist in 1997, but quit after a few years to focus his efforts on Gamma Ray. He then forged a successful career with Gamma Ray, releasing several albums and playing many tours worldwide.

Hansen participated in a large number of other projects. He appeared as a guest vocalist on Blind Guardian's albums Follow the Blind and Tales from the Twilight World. Around the same time, he and fellow Gamma Ray bandmate Dirk Schlächter collaborated on Angra's first full-length album Angels Cry, both playing guitar solos in the song "Never Understand". He also collaborated on Angra's album Temple of Shadows released in 2004 doing vocals for the song "The Temple of Hate". He participated as a guest guitarist on Michael Kiske's debut solo album Instant Clarity. Together with HammerFall he recorded a cover version of Helloween's "I Want Out".

Hansen played the role of Regrin the dwarf in Avantasia's Metal Opera albums by Tobias Sammet. Later he was featured in the album The Scarecrow playing guitar in the song "Shelter from the Rain". He was also one of the guest musicians in Avantasia's 2010 world tour, which have put him to play live together with fellow ex-bandmate Michael Kiske, after more than twenty years since he left Helloween. After this tour it was announced, via Michael Kiske's official website, that Hansen would join his new band Unisonic, as they "instantly felt the magic of Helloween years again and had a lot of fun together on and off stage".

In 2005, he toured with the young German power/Viking metal band Stormwarrior from his home town of Hamburg as lead singer, playing material from his classic Helloween debut album Walls of Jericho – the favorite album and greatest influence of Stormwarrior. "Stormwarrior featuring Kai Hansen" returned in 2007 to play at the Magic Circle Festival in Bad Arolsen and at the Wacken Open Air Festival.

In 2008, Hansen played with Stormwarrior at Sweden Rock Festival 2008.

In 2011, Hansen joined the hard-rock band Unisonic, as second guitarist and reunited with old friend and ex-Helloween vocalist Michael Kiske, who formed the band in 2009. The band released its debut album, Unisonic in 2012 and embarked on its first world tour. Hansen stated in an interview that despite being a member of Unisonic, he will not have less focus on Gamma Ray, and that the next Gamma Ray album should arrive in 2013. Unisonic's second album, Light Of Dawn, was released in 2014 and a European and Japanese tour followed.

In 2015, following the Best of the Best Party Tour, Hansen hired Frank Beck as their second vocalist for the Gamma Ray.

In 2016, Hansen released his first solo album titled XXX – Three Decades in Metal. The album was released via earMUSIC on September 16 of the same year.

In 2017 Kai Hansen played minitour - four shows in Slovakia (where he resides as of 2025) and Czech republic with the band Ravenclaw, with special set for Ravenclaw 15-Years Anniversary - Ravenclaw feat. Kai Hansen.

On November 14, 2016, was announced the Pumpkins United World Tour - a concert tour of the German power metal band Helloween. Former members Michael Kiske and Kai Hansen joined the current members for this tour for 2017, 2018 and 2019.

== Singing style ==
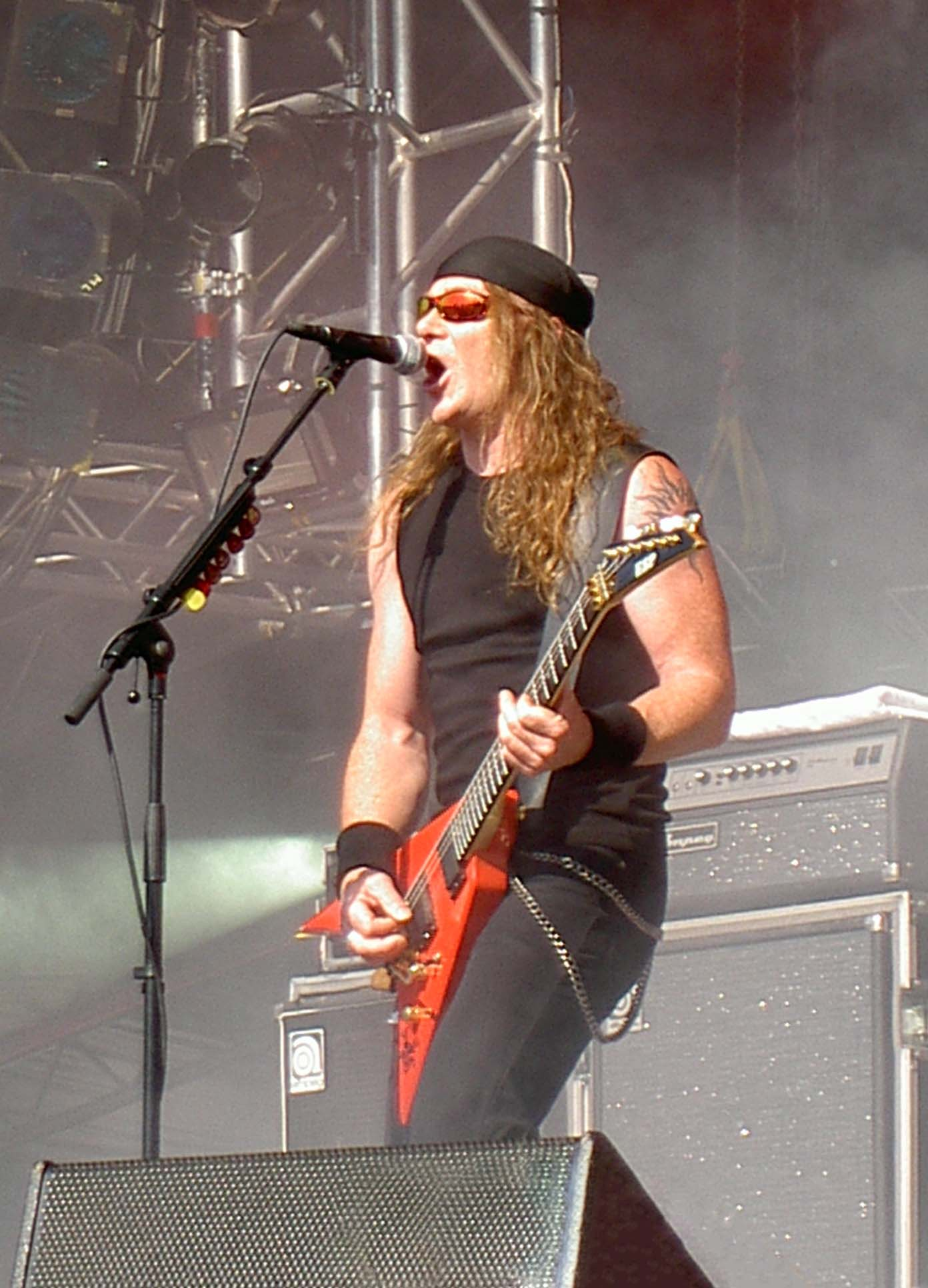
Tuska Open Air Metal Festival 2005

During his earlier years Hansen's singing style was reminiscent of many thrash metal vocalists. Rather than using a smooth and clear style (like his successor Kiske) Hansen sang with a raspy sound, interluded by high-pitched screams for dramatic effect. Kiske was brought in as a singer, originally because Hansen had trouble singing and playing the guitar simultaneously, though later in his career he seems to have overcome these problems.

Beginning from 1995 onward, Hansen has provided the vocals for his current band Gamma Ray. Around that time, Hansen's vocal style became more melodic and slightly clearer, more in the traditional power metal sense, while still retaining the slight nasal tone and rasp of his early years.

== Equipment ==
Since late 1980s, Hansen has played ESP Guitars. He first started using them during his days with Helloween after hearing testimonials of ESP from artists such as George Lynch (formerly of Dokken) and Kirk Hammett of Metallica. Before Helloween, he had owned a white Ibanez guitar, and a Gibson Les Paul, then saved up for a Marshall amplifier by delivering newspapers. His main ESP has been a red ESP Custom guitar based on Jackson's Randy Rhoads asymmetrical V model and two custom V models based on the classic Gibson Flying V shape.

During the early 1990s, Hansen had used Stratocaster models. On his autobiography on the Gamma Ray website, he claims his first electric guitar was a white Ibanez Les Paul copy On the recent tour with Gamma Ray he has been seen using a Korina Epiphone flying V with EMG pickups.

Since 2022, during his reunion with Helloween, Hansen has also used a red/pink custom made RR style V model, named "Pink Panther", made by Viv Guitars.

For the 40th Anniversary Helloween World Tour, Hansen commissioned two special RR style V models (one with a Floyd Rose bridge and one with a Tune-o-matic bridge), made by EBG Instruments, that he used extensively during the live shows.

Hansen has used, and still uses, Engl amplifiers since the recording sessions of Keeper of the Seven Keys: Part II.

== Discography ==
Helloween

- Helloween (1985) - EP
- Walls of Jericho (1985)
- Judas (1986) - Single
- Keeper of the Seven Keys: Part I (1987)
- Keeper of the Seven Keys: Part II (1988)
- Live in the U.K. (1989) – Live album
- Pumpkins United (2017) – Single
- United Alive in Madrid (2019) - Live album
- Helloween (2021)
- Live at Budokan (2024)
- Giants & Monsters (2025)

Gamma Ray

- Heading for Tomorrow (1990)
- Sigh No More (1991)
- Insanity and Genius (1993)
- Land of the Free (1995)
- Alive '95 (1996) – Live album
- Somewhere Out in Space (1997)
- The Karaoke Album (1997) – Karaoke Compilation album
- Power Plant (1999)
- Blast from the Past (2000) – "Best of" Compilation album with re-recorded songs
- No World Order (2001)
- Skeletons in the Closet (2003) – Live album
- Majestic (2005)
- Land of the Free II (2007)
- Hell yeah! – The Awesome Foursome – Live in Montreal (2008) - Live album
- To the Metal! (2010)
- Skeletons & Majesties (2011) – Compilation album
- Skeletons & Majesties Live (2012) – Live album
- Empire of the Undead (2014)

Iron Savior

- Iron Savior (1997)
- Unification (1998)
- Interlude (1999) - EP
- Dark Assault (2001)
- Reforged – Ironbound (2022)

Unisonic

- Ignition (2012) - EP
- Unisonic (2012)
- For the Kingdom (2014) - EP
- Light of Dawn (2014)
- Live in Wacken (2017) - Live album

Hansen & Friends

- XXX – Three Decades in Metal (2016)
- Thank You Wacken Live (2017) - Live album
- Born with a Hammer (2026)

== Guest appearances ==
- With Rampage:
  - Love Lights Up the Night – vocals on "Life"
  - Victims of Rock - vocals on "I Don't Wanna Be A Rock 'N' Roll Star"
- With Blind Guardian:
  - Follow the Blind – vocals and guitar solo on "Valhalla", guitar solo on "Hall of the King"
  - Tales from the Twilight World – vocals on "Lost in the Twilight Hall," guitar solo on "The Last Candle"
  - Somewhere Far Beyond – guitar solo on "The Quest for Tanelorn"
- With Angra:
  - Angels Cry – guitar solo on "Never Understand"
  - Temple of Shadows – vocals on "The Temple of Hate"
- With Michael Kiske:
  - Instant Clarity – guitars on "Be True To Yourself", "The Calling", "New Horizons", "Thanx A Lot"
- With Primal Fear:
  - Primal Fear – guitar solo on "Formula One", "Dollars", "Speedking"
- With HammerFall:
  - I Want Out EP – vocals on "I Want Out" and backing vocals on "Man on the Silver Mountain"
- With Tobias Sammet's Avantasia:
  - The Metal Opera – as "Regrin the Dwarf" he has vocal parts in "Inside" and "Sign of the Cross"
  - The Metal Opera Part II – he reprises his role and has vocal parts in "The Seven Angels" and "Chalice of Agony"
  - The Scarecrow – lead guitar on "Shelter from the Rain"
  - The Flying Opera (live album) – vocals on "The Toy Master"
- With Heavenly:
  - Coming from the Sky – vocals on "Time machine"
- With Stormwarrior:
  - Stormwarrior – vocals & guitar on "Chains of Slavery" and "Heavy Metal is the Law" and narration on "Iron Prayers"
  - Northern Rage – additional vocals on "Heroic Deathe" and guitar solo on "Welcome Thy Rite"
- With Headhunter:
  - Parody of Life – guest appearance on "Cursed"
- With Heavenwood:
  - Swallow – vocals & guitar on "Luna", and vocal on "Downcast"
- With Place Vendome:
  - Close to the Sun – guitar solo on "Across The Times" and "Riding The Ghost"
- With Tragedian:
  - Unholy Divine – guest appearance on "Over The Edge", project / production consultant

First Original member	Helloween guitarist 1984–1989; 2016–present	Succeeded by Roland Grapow
