= Gamma Ray (band) =

German power metal band

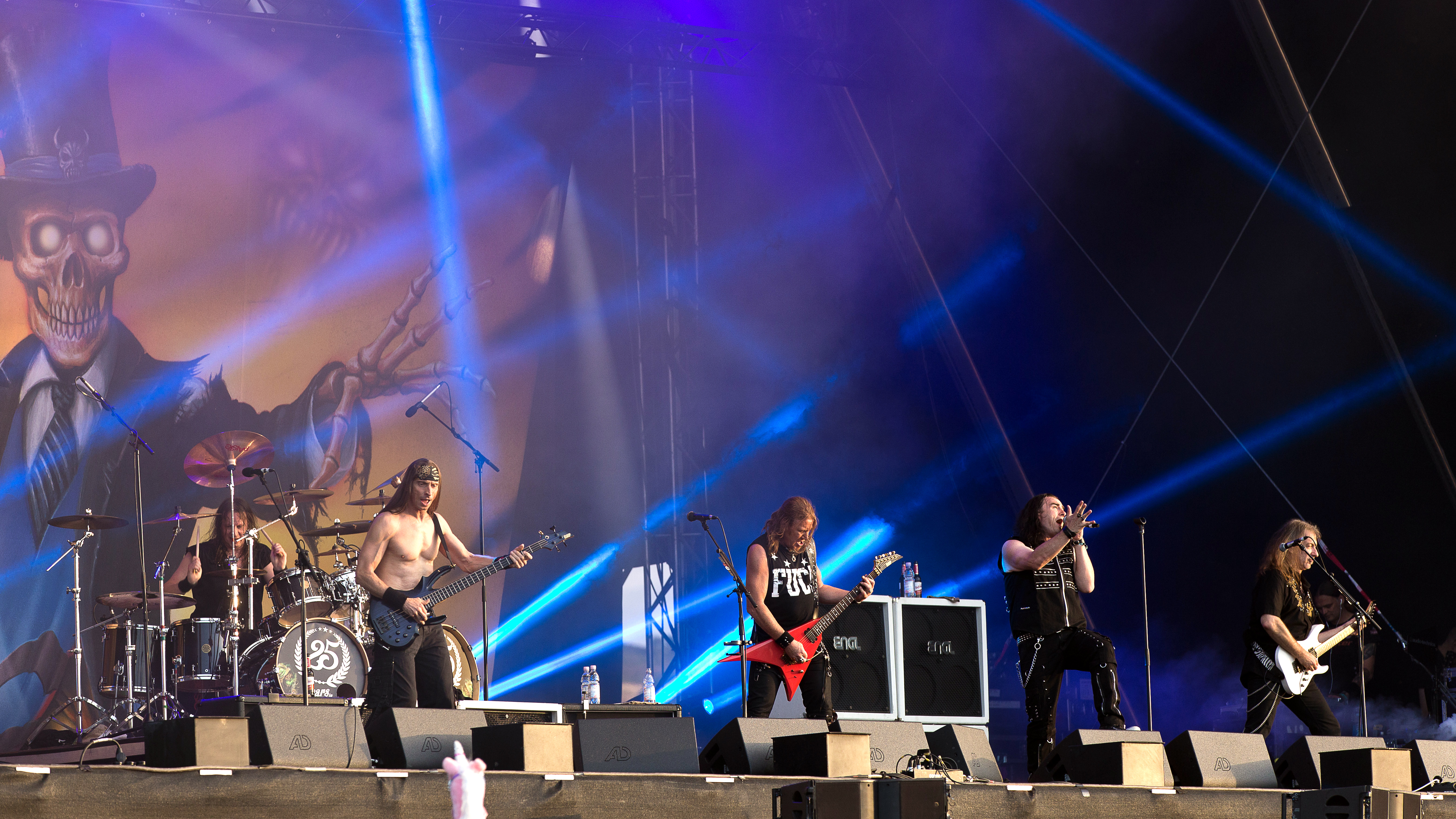
- Gamma Ray in 2015

Background information
- Origin: Hamburg, West Germany
- Genres: Power metal; heavy metal; speed metal
- Years active: 1989–present
- Labels: RCA; FAD; Noise; Sanctuary; SPV/Steamhammer
- Members: Kai Hansen; Dirk Schlächter; Henjo Richter; Michael Ehré; Frank Beck
- Past members: Ralf Scheepers; Uwe Wessel; Mathias Burchard; Uli Kusch; Jan Rubach; Thomas Nack; Dan Zimmermann
- Website: gammaray.org

Gamma Ray is a German power metal band from Hamburg, founded and fronted by Kai Hansen after his departure from power metal band Helloween, in 1989. He is the band's lead vocalist, guitarist and chief songwriter. Between 1990 and 2014, Gamma Ray recorded eleven studio albums.

== History ==
=== Formation ===
In 1988, after four years with the German power metal band Helloween, guitarist and songwriter Kai Hansen decided to leave the group. Hansen claimed that Helloween had become too big for him to handle, although the group's troubles with financial issues and their record company, Noise Records, most likely played a part as well. He proceeded to do some studio work with German power metal band Blind Guardian and, in 1989, decided to form his own project with longtime friend Ralf Scheepers, former vocalist of the band Tyran Pace. This two-man project grew into a four-man band with the addition of Uwe Wessel on bass and Mathias Burchardt on drums. This was the first lineup of Gamma Ray, bearing a sound understandably close to that of Helloween of that period.

=== The Scheepers era (1989–1995) ===
The original lineup released the album Heading for Tomorrow in February 1990 and, later that year, the Heaven Can Wait EP, with new guitarist Dirk Schlächter and new drummer Uli Kusch.

In February 1991, the band began rehearsing for the recording of their second album in a small, remote house in Denmark. With some brand-new songs written, Gamma Ray entered the studio under the supervision of producer Tommy Newton and recorded their second album Sigh No More, which was released in September 1991. The style differed vastly from that of Heading for Tomorrow, featuring darker lyrics inspired by the Persian Gulf War that was raging at the time. A 50-date worldwide tour followed.

After the Japanese tour at the beginning of 1991, Gamma Ray underwent another personnel change: the rhythm section (Wessel and Kusch) left due to a personal disagreement and were replaced by Jan Rubach (bass) and Thomas Nack (drums), both from the Hamburg band Anesthesia. The band also began to build their own studio, so work on their new album did not start until 1993. The album Insanity and Genius was released in June 1993, with a style which was closer to that of Heading for Tomorrow than Sigh No More. In September 1993, Gamma Ray, along with Rage, Helicon and Conception, embarked on the Melodic Metal Strikes Back tour. The tour contributed to the release of the double CD Power of Metal, and the videos Power of Metal and Lust for Live, in December.

=== Land of the Free to Majestic (1995–2006) ===
More changes in the lineup followed for Gamma Ray. Vocalist Ralf Scheepers, who lived far away from the other band members hometown of Hamburg, attempted to become the new Judas Priest singer after Rob Halford left. He felt that his position in the band had been strained due to the distance between him and the other members. Hansen and Scheepers agreed to an amicable departure. After failing to be recruited for Judas Priest, Scheepers started his own band, Primal Fear.

Hansen spoke in an interview 1999 about why Scheepers left:

There were two main reasons. One was after the first three Gamma Ray albums we said – now we want to do a really, really good album, something really killer. But Ralf was not living in Hamburg, he was living 700 km away from here. For that reason he only came up for a while for rehearsal or for the recordings. But to do an album which was really good we needed him there constantly. In years before we had been talking about him moving to Hamburg but at that time he still had a job going on...he still does and he's never going to leave it somehow. He could not really make up his mind to move to Hamburg and there was one problem with that because when we wrote the songs I was always trying to think of his voice but on the other hand it would have been a lot better if he write his own vocal lines, melodies and lyrics. When he came to Hamburg most of the times I was singing in the rehearsal room when he was not there and I was singing on my demos so it was like everything was more or less fixed and he could not really change it. We wanted that to change, therefore we wanted him to move to Hamburg, he could not make up his mind. Then we said either you do it or you die somehow you know...like putting the pistol to his chest. Well....on the other hand he had this Judas Priest thing going on. He wanted to be given a chance. I was the idiot who told him maybe for fun just try it out when it was clear they were searching for a singer because Judas Priest was always his favorite band. We were thinking about him doing the Gamma Ray album and then going to Judas Priest. All in all it led to the point where we said we'd rather split our ways at that point because it doesn't make sense to go on like that. [sic]

Hansen then began to search for a new vocalist but, due to demand from friends and fans, took on the guitar-vocal duties himself as he had done for Helloween's first EP and album. In 1995, the fourth album, Land of the Free, the first to feature Hansen on vocals, was released. The album was praised by critics and fans alike. In a 2008 interview, Hansen spoke about the importance of the Land of the Free album and what it represented:

We made it exactly at a time point when this kind of metal was proclaimed to be dead as can be. Where it was almost like if a drummer came up with a double bass drum people would say 'ya dooga daga yourself out of here man.' Everything was ruled by Kurt Cobain and the alternative to the alternative and all that kind of stuff. So at that point we made an album like this and it went down very successful. That was cool, that was something special. I think it was the album that gave Gamma Ray the acceptance as being a band not only a Kai Hansen project. [sic]

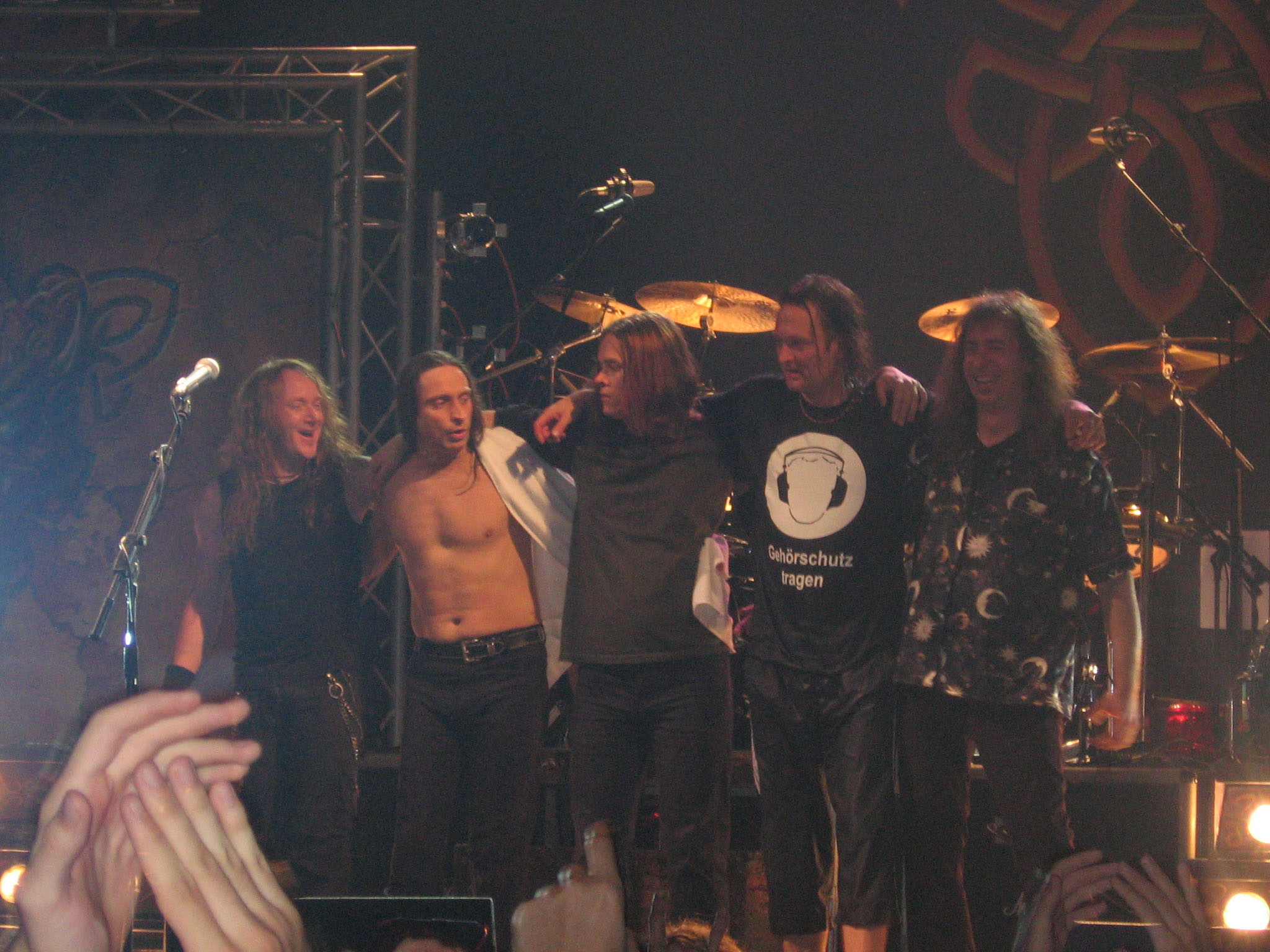
Gamma Ray in 2005

The tour following the album, Men on a Tour, brought the recording and release of the live album Alive '95 in 1996. Soon after, there was yet another major lineup change. Jan Rubach and Thomas Nack both left in order to return to Anesthesia, with Gamma Ray recruiting new drummer Dan Zimmermann. Zimmerman is also known for being a founding member of the German power metal band Freedom Call. Schlächter, who was originally a bass player, as can be seen on the 1990 video Heading for the East, left the second guitar spot and took back his original bass guitar position, being replaced on guitar by Henjo Richter.

Work started on the next album, and 1997 saw the release of Somewhere Out in Space, which marked the beginning of the band's thematic concentration on space. The album featured the hit "Valley of the Kings" and entered in the charts of many European countries. After two years of touring came the album Power Plant, which was a continuation of Somewhere Out in Space's lyrical approach but featuring a new direction musically. The album was highly acclaimed throughout the world and gained even more chart success than its predecessor.

For Gamma Ray's next work, Hansen decided to do things differently from the usual compilation of songs. He let the fans decide by voting on their website for their three favorite songs on each album, then the band went back to the studio to re-record the old tracks from the first three albums and made remixed versions for the songs from the later albums. Blast from the Past was the name chosen for this double remix album.

After a one-year break, when Hansen concentrated on his side project Iron Savior, the band was ready for the recording and release of the album No World Order, which was stylistically similar to NWOBHM bands such as Iron Maiden and Judas Priest. Again, the album was highly praised and the No Order World tour saw the band visiting dozens of European countries and Japan. After resting from the tour, the band went on with the Skeletons in the Closet tour, which saw the band performing songs that they never or rarely played live before. Once again, the setlist was voted by the fans on the band's website. Only a few shows were played on this tour, but two of those were recorded for the live album Skeletons in the Closet.

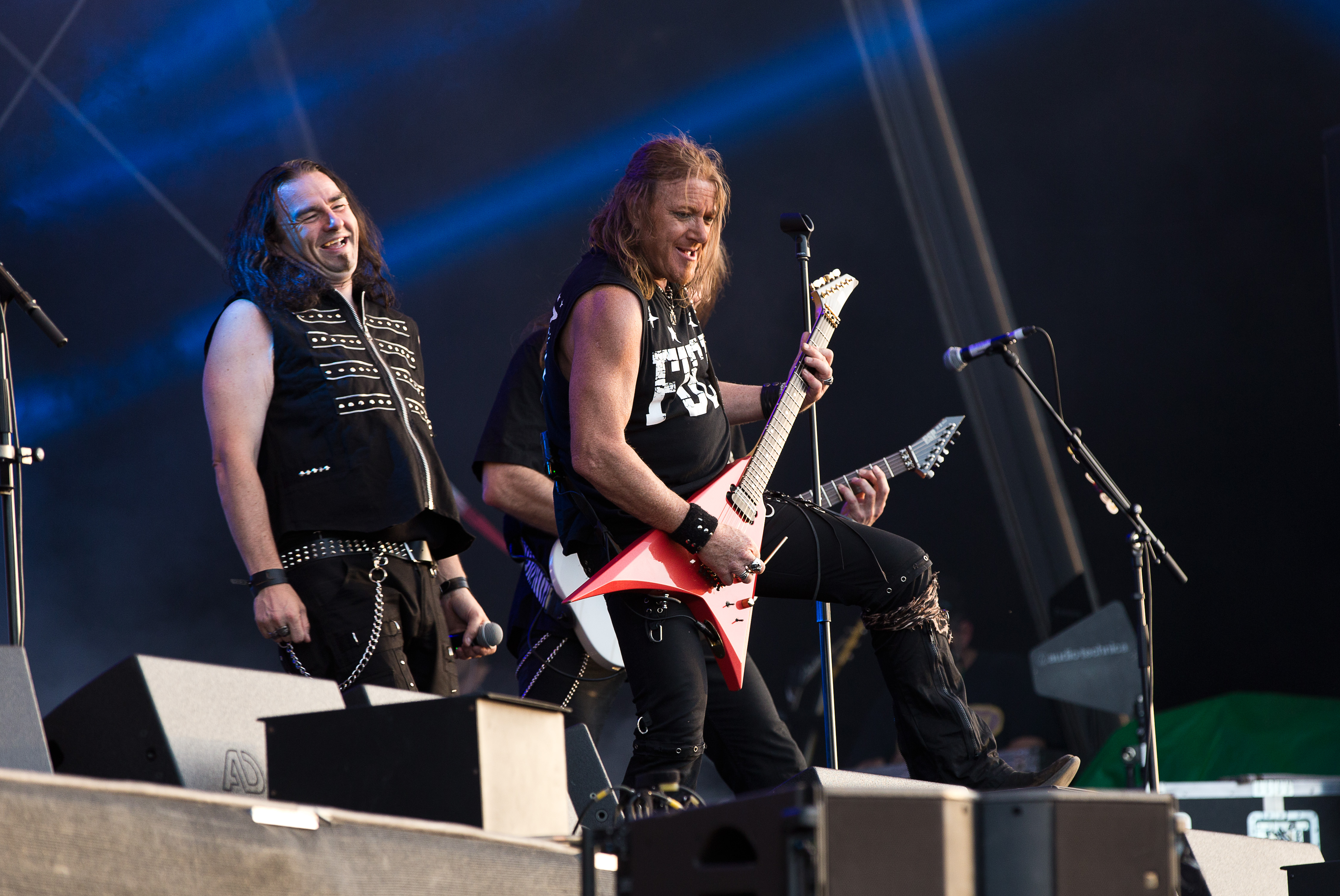
Gamma Ray at Rockharz Open Air 2016

Kai Hansen and Henjo Richter also participated in Tobias Sammet's project Avantasia, on both The Metal Opera and The Metal Opera Part II, along with various other musicians including Hansen's former bandmates from Helloween, Markus Grosskopf and Michael Kiske.

A live DVD, Hell Yeah!!! The Awesome Foursome (And the Finnish keyboarder who didn't want to wear his Donald Duck costume: Live in Montreal) was recorded on 6 May 2006 at Le Medley in Montreal, Quebec. The setlist contained songs drawn from all of their albums up to Majestic (excluding Insanity and Genius) and also a cover of the Helloween hit "I Want Out". The DVD was released more than two years later on 4 November 2008. It entered the German media control charts at No. 9 and the Swedish charts at No. 1, according to the band's official website.

=== Land of the Free II to Empire of the Undead (2007–2014) ===
In recent years, Gamma Ray have made use of touring keyboard players to fully augment their sound in a live environment. Axel Mackenrott of Masterplan fulfilled these duties in the past and was followed by Eero Kaukomies, a Finn who also plays in a Gamma Ray tribute band named Guardians of Mankind. His bandmate, Kasperi Heikkinen, also played on part of the Majestic tour in 2006 following an injury to Henjo Richter. On their most recent To the Metal! tour, Kasperi Heikkinen replaced Henjo Richter once again for shows scheduled in Germany and Czech Republic in March 2010. Richter was hospitalized on 16 March 2010 due to retinal detachment. Heikkinen also shared stage with fellow axemen Hansen and Richter making "a three-guitar special" for the encore numbers at the Nosturi club in Helsinki, Finland, on 29 March 2010.

Land of the Free II was released in late 2007 as a sequel to the hugely successful Land of the Free album. To promote the album, Gamma Ray were the "very special guest" on Helloween's Hellish Rock 2007/2008 World Tour, on some shows along with the band Axxis. For the final encores of the evening, Hansen and members of Gamma Ray joined Helloween to play a couple of songs from when he was in the latter band. Hansen would also regularly join Helloween co-founder Michael Weikath at center stage to the delight of fans of both bands.

To the Metal! was released as the tenth studio album by the band. It was released on 29 January 2010 to modest critical praise, but disappointed some fans, who felt that it was uninspired and a weaker effort than Land of the Free II.

On 31 May 2011, Gamma Ray released an EP entitled Skeletons and Majesties. It contains newly recorded, rarely played material ("Skeletons") and acoustic versions of other older songs ("Majesties").

Hansen stated in an interview in February 2012 that he expected the next Gamma Ray album to be released in January 2013. On 1 September 2012, the band announced Michael Ehré as their new drummer, replacing Daniel Zimmermann who chose to retire after 15 years of band activity.

Kai Hansen revealed, in an interview with Metal Blast in April 2013, that their eleventh album, Empire of the Undead, would have a "more thrashy" sound. In the same interview, Dirk Schlächter announced that the band would do a headlining tour following its release. Empire of the Undead was released in March 2014, despite Gamma Ray's studio being completely destroyed by a fire.

=== Additional vocalist and new album (2015–present) ===
In October 2015, it was announced that Frank Beck would be a new lead vocalist of Gamma Ray, in addition to Hansen. This was due to Hansen's degrading vocals due to lengthy tour schedules, as well as Hansen's desire to have more freedom onstage.

In 2016, Hansen released his first solo album titled XXX – Three Decades in Metal. The album was released via earMUSIC on September 16 of the same year.

On 10 August 2017, the band announced that they would be releasing a 25th-anniversary edition of Land of the Free.

In June 2021, on the Scars and Guitars podcast, Kai Hansen stated that, despite his reunion with Helloween, he is not letting Gamma Ray die, and that he is preparing material for a new album to be tentatively released in 2022.

In 2023, Gamma Ray released a remastered version of Blast from the Past in a limited 3-CD digipak (which includes the Skeletons & Majesties EP) digitally and on vinyl LP.

== Band members ==
Current

- Kai Hansen – guitar, lead and backing vocals (1989–present)
- Dirk Schlächter – bass (occasionally: 1990–1993, full time: 1997–present), guitar, keyboards, piano (1990–1997), backing vocals (1990–present)
- Henjo Richter – guitar, keyboards, backing vocals (1997–present)
- Michael Ehré – drums (2012–present)
- Frank Beck – lead and backing vocals (2015–present)

Former

- Ralf Scheepers – lead vocals (1989–1994)
- Uwe Wessel – bass, backing vocals, occasional rhythm guitar (1989–1993)
- Jan Rubach – bass (1993–1997), backing vocals (1995–1997)
- Mathias Burchard – drums (1989–1990)
- Uli Kusch – drums, backing vocals (1990–1992)
- Thomas Nack – drums (1993–1997), backing vocals (1995)
- Dan Zimmermann – drums, backing vocals (1997–2012)

Session

- Michael Kiske – vocals on "Time to Break Free" and "Land of the Free" (1995), in "All You Need to Know" (2010).
- Hansi Kürsch – vocals on "Farewell" and "Land of the Free" (1995).
- Tommy Newton – guitar (1989, 1990, 1991)
- Tommy Hansen – keyboards (1991)
- Piet Sielck – vocals, keyboards, guitar (1989, 1990, 1991, 1997)
- Tammo Vollmers – drums, also stand in drummer for space eater video (1989)
- Mischa Gerlach – keyboards, piano (1989)
- Sascha Paeth – keyboards (1993, 1995)
- Thomas Stauch – drums (1997)
- Axel Mackenrott – keyboards (2005)

Live

- Henning Basse – vocals (2008)
- Jorn Ellerbrock – keyboards, piano (1990–1991)
- Mike Terrana – drums (1998)
- Dan Olding – keyboards (2001)
- Axel Mackenrott – keyboards (2004)
- Kasperi Heikkinen – guitar (2006, 2010, 2024)
- Eero Kaukomies – keyboards (2005–2007)
- Michael Kiske – vocals (2011)
- Michael Ehre – drums (2011, 2012)
- Ralf Scheepers – vocals (2015, 2020)
- Michele Sanna – drums (2024)

== Discography ==
- Heading for Tomorrow (1990)
- Sigh No More (1991)
- Insanity and Genius (1993)
- Land of the Free (1995)
- Somewhere Out in Space (1997)
- Power Plant (1999)
- No World Order (2001)
- Majestic (2005)
- Land of the Free II (2007)
- To the Metal! (2010)
- Empire of the Undead (2014)
