= Motherland (Daedalus album) =

Studio album by Daedalus
- Released: May 2011
- Recorded: 2011, Genoa, Italy
- Genre: Progressive metal
- Length: 63
- Label: Galileo Records

Daedalus chronology
The Never Ending Illusion (2009)	Motherland (2011)

Motherland is the third studio album from Italian Progressive metal band Daedalus.

Roland Grapow (of Helloween and Masterplan) mixed the recordings and played the guitar solo on the song Underground. Nerve Design (previously seen with Threshold, Extrema, Vision Divine, and Sadist) drew the album artwork.

Elisa Montaldo (of Il Tempio delle Clessidre) recorded all of the keyboard and synth sections, using her peculiar vintage sounds. Some vocal lines in "Sand" and "Empty Rooms" were recorded by Trevor (of Sadist). All the choir sections were sung by Daedalus.

The lyrics analyze from different points of view the uneasiness in today’s world.

== Track listing ==
No.	Title	Writer(s)	Length
1.	"What a challenging world"	Gremo	2:20
2.	"Your lies"	Gremo	3:56
3.	"Until you're here"	Gremo	4:54
4.	"Perspective of the moon"	Gremo	4:58
5.	"For aye"	Merletto, Gremo	6:19
6.	"Motherland"	Gremo	6:53
7.	"Sand"	Torretta	5:06
8.	"Weather the storm"	La Rosa, Gremo	5:39
9.	"Underground"	Gremo	4:25
10.	"A tale"	Gremo	6:12
11.	"Empty rooms"	Gremo	6:43

== Personnel ==
- Davide Merletto – vocals
- Andrea Torretta – guitar
- Fabio Gremo – bass
- Davide La Rosa – drums
