= Daedalus (band) =

- Origin: Genoa, Italy
- Genre: Progressive metal
- Years active: 2000–present
- Label: Galileo Records
- Members: Davide Merletto; Fabio Gremo; Andrea Torretta; Davide La Rosa; Sandro Amadei
- Past members: Giuseppe Spanò; Andrea Rinaldi; Alessio Brunetti; Luca D'Angelo
- Website: progdaedalus.it

Daedalus is an Italian progressive metal band. Their music contains influences from different musical genres, among them rock, progressive rock, heavy metal, classical music, jazz, electronic music, ambient.

== History ==
Daedalus was born in Genoa (Italy) in 2000, as the result of a project started by Fabio Gremo. In October 2003 the Italian label New LM Records published the first album of the band, Leading Far from a Mistake. Since 2004 the band had gigs in several Italian and foreign concert halls, also as opening act for well known metal bands like DGM, Daemonia (Claudio Simonetti), Twinspirits (Daniele Liverani), Misfits and Extrema.

The works on the second album The Never Ending Illusion were completed in 2008. Roland Grapow (Helloween, Masterplan) made the mixing, while Mark Wilkinson (who worked among the others for Marillion, Iron Maiden and Judas Priest) drew the artwork. The album, featuring Roberto Tiranti (Labyrinth) and Alessandro Corvaglia as guests, was published by the Swiss label Galileo Records in January 2009. Good reviews were published about it on several musical magazines (Metal Hammer, Rock Hard and Metal Maniac) and webzines. On 7 November 2009 Daedalus played live at Z7 in Pratteln (Basel) during the festival organized by Galileo Records for the 10th anniversary of the label.

The band completed the recordings of the third album, Motherland, which has been mixed by Roland Grapow. Trevor (Sadist) and Elisa Montaldo (Il Tempio delle Clessidre) appear as guests respectively as vocalist and main keyboardist. The artwork has been drawn by Nerve Design (Threshold, Extrema, Vision Divine, Sadist). The album is distributed by Galileo Records and Gonzo Multimedia starting from 2 May 2011. A promotional music video has been made for the song Until You're Here.

Spanò died on August 26, 2021, due to a boat incident in Porto Pollo, Sardinia.

== Band members ==
=== Current members ===
- Fabio Gremo – Bass guitar, Backing vocals (2000–)
- Davide La Rosa – Drums, Backing vocals (2003–)
- Davide Merletto – Lead vocals (2006–)
- Andrea Torretta – Guitars, Backing vocals (2004–)
- Sandro Amadei – Keyboards (2011–)

=== Former members ===
- Giuseppe Spanò – Keyboards (2000–2010)
- Andrea Rinaldi – Guitars (2000–2004)
- Alessio Brunetti – Lead vocals (2002–2004)
- Luca D'Angelo – Lead vocals (2004–2005)

== Discography ==
- Leading Far from a Mistake – 2003
- The Never Ending Illusion – 2009
- Motherland – 2011
