= The Never Ending Illusion =

Studio album by Daedalus
- Released: January 2009
- Recorded: 2009, Genoa, Italy
- Genre: Progressive metal
- Length: 41:10
- Label: Galileo Records

Daedalus chronology
Leading Far from a Mistake (2003)	The Never Ending Illusion (2009)	Motherland (2011)

The Never Ending Illusion is the second studio album from Italian Progressive metal band Daedalus.
Roland Grapow (Helloween, Masterplan) mixed the recordings and Mark Wilkinson (Marillion, Iron Maiden, Judas Priest) drew the artwork.
Some vocal sections in "Mare di Stelle" (the only track sung in Italian in this album) were recorded by Roberto Tiranti (Labyrinth) and Alessandro Corvaglia.
In this album some acoustic instruments were used, including double bass and French horn.

== Track listing ==
No.	Title	Writer(s)	Length
1.	"Waiting for the dawn"	Gremo	1:13
2.	"Perfect smile"	Gremo	6:24
3.	"Life"	Gremo	5:45
4.	"Hopeless"	Gremo	5:10
5.	"Cold embrace"	Gremo	5:24
6.	"The never ending illusion"	Gremo	9:06
7.	"The dancers"	Gremo	5:05
8.	"Horizons in a box"	Gremo, Rinaldi, Torretta	7:11
9.	"A journey to myself"	Gremo, Torretta	6:32
10.	"Mare di stelle"	Gremo	5:27

== Credits ==
- Davide Merletto - vocals
- Andrea Torretta - guitar
- Fabio Gremo - bass
- Giuseppe Spanò - synth
- Davide La Rosa - drums
