= Time to Be King =

Studio album by Masterplan
- Released: 21 May 2010
- Recorded: 2009–2010
- Genre: Power metal
- Label: AFM
- Producer: Roland Grapow

Masterplan chronology
MKII (2007)	Time to Be King (2010)	Novum Initium (2013)

Singles from Time to Be King
- 1. "Far from the End of the World" Released: 19 April 2010

Professional ratings
Review scores
Source	Rating
About.com	3.5/5 stars
AllMusic	3.5/5 stars
Lords of Metal	8.5/10 stars

Time to Be King is the fourth studio album by the multinational power metal band Masterplan. It is their third album with original singer Jørn Lande, the first since his original departure in 2006, and the last before his final departure in 2012. He left the band in 2006 for the first time, citing musical differences as the reason.

The album was originally planned to be released on 16 April 2010 but during a listening session in Hamburg it was confirmed that the release date was pushed back to 21 May. Lead singer Jørn Lande had a major contribution to the songwriting; he wrote some of the music and all the lyrics for the songs. Also keyboardist Axel Mackenrott took part as one of the main songwriters and brought the ideas for songs like Time to Be King and Blue Europa. Roland Grapow said Axel is now "totally filling the shoes of Uli (Kusch) and he has a very familiar style of writing that I love so much and it’s very important for the band."

Jørn Lande recorded a slightly different version of the title track for his 2012 solo album, Bring Heavy Rock to the Land.

The band had some problems touring during the time the album was released due to some of the band members' other commitments. This resulted in the departure of bass player Jan S. Eckert, drummer Mike Terrana and once again singer Jørn Lande from the band.

== Track listing ==
All music written by Roland Grapow, Jørn Lande & Axel Mackenrott, except where noted. All lyrics by Jørn Lande.

No.	Title	Length
1.	"Fiddle of Time" (Roland Grapow / Jørn Lande / Axel Mackenrott / Carl Johan Grimmark)	4:22
2.	"Blow Your Winds" (Roland Grapow / Jørn Lande / Axel Mackenrott / Erik Lidbom)	3:19
3.	"Far from the End of the World"	3:34
4.	"Time to Be King"	4:44
5.	"Lonely Winds of War" (partially by Alexander Borodin (Polovtsian Dances from the opera Prince Igor))	4:35
6.	"The Dark Road"	6:22
7.	"The Sun Is in Your Hands"	4:27
8.	"The Black One"	4:13
9.	"Blue Europa"	5:08
10.	"Under the Moon" (Roland Grapow / Jørn Lande / Axel Mackenrott / Joachim Küstner)	4:15

(Bonus Track Listing)
No.	Title	Length
1.	"Kisses from You" (Digipack Edition, as track # 11)	2:50
2.	"Never Walk Alone" (Japanese Version, as track # 11)	4:38

== Line-up ==
- Jørn Lande – vocals
- Roland Grapow – guitar
- Jan S. Eckert – bass, backing vocals
- Mike Terrana – drums
- Axel Mackenrott – keyboards

=== Technical personnel ===
- Produced by Roland Grapow
- Recorded by Roland Grapow at Grapow Studios (SVK)
- Mixed & Mastered by Mikko Karmila, Roland Grapow & Mika Jussila at Finnvox Studio, Helsinki (FIN)
- Bandphotos by Sight of Sound
- Artwork & Design by Hiko
- Original crown designed by Jose Mesa "Mataparda".
