= Ride the Sky =

Swedish progressive power metal band

- Origin: Stockholm, Sweden
- Genres: Progressive metal, power metal, symphonic metal, hard rock
- Years active: 2006–2008
- Label: Nuclear Blast
- Members: Bjørn Jansson; Uli Kusch; Benny Jansson; Mathias Garnås
- Past members: Kaspar Dahlqvist
- Website: www.ridethesky.eu

Ride the Sky was a progressive power metal band formed by ex-Helloween, Gamma Ray, and Masterplan drummer Uli Kusch, and Tears of Anger members Bjørn Jansson and Benny Jansson.

== History ==
The ground work for Ride the Sky began in 2006 when drummer Uli Kusch started swapping musical ideas with vocalist Bjorn Jansson. Uli left Masterplan later that year and was asked by Bjorn and Benny to do some guest work on the next Tears of Anger album. Uli was impressed with the music sent to him, and started sending some of his own compositions back to them. The three musicians decided to put all their work to play in Ride the Sky. The trio hired bassist Mathias Garnås, and keyboardist Kaspar Dahlqvist, in order to, according to them, to "Gain the highest caliber of talent to complete the band". They have so far released one album entitled New Protection, on metal label Nuclear Blast records. The band combines strong traits of progressive metal, power metal, and symphonic metal, with strong influences from 80s hard rock.

On November 17, 2007, on their website they announced that Kaspar departed from the line-up for personal reasons, and that Ram-Zet's Henning "Zet" Ramseth was to replace him on keyboards and rhythm guitar for the rest of the tour.

On April 22, 2008 the band stated in their blog on MySpace that they have officially broken up, saying "There was not much media focus and together with a minor support from the record company, we came to the point where it was just not worth the work to even try to complete a second album."

== Band members ==
=== Final lineup ===
- Bjørn Jansson – vocals (2006–2008)
- Uli Kusch – drums (2006–2008)
- Benny Jansson – guitar, backing vocals (2006–2008)
- Mathias Garnås – bass guitar (2006–2008)

=== Former ===
- Kaspar Dahlqvist – keyboards (2006–2007)

=== Session ===
- Henning Ramseth – keyboards, rhythm guitar (2007–2008)

== Discography ==
The band's only album, New Protection, was released through Nuclear Blast on August 22, 2007. It was recorded at Zinkens-Studios in Stockholm. A video was made for the title track of the album. AllMusic said the combination of metal and hard rock made New Protection a polished and effective album.

Track listing

No.	Title	Length
1.	"New Protection"	3:20
2.	"A Smile from Heaven's Eye"	4:17
3.	"Silent War"	4:33
4.	"The Prince of Darkness"	5:20
5.	"Break the Chain"	4:32
6.	"Corroded Dreams"	3:51
7.	"The End of Days"	4:12
8.	"Far Beyond the Stars"	4:18
9.	"Black Cloud"	3:37
10.	"Endless"	3:05
11.	"Heaven Only Knows"	3:44
12.	"A Crack in the Wall"	5:17

Japanese Bonus Track
No.	Title	Length
13.	"Trail of Flame" (Bonus track)	3:47

Limited Edition Digipak
No.	Title	Length
13.	"Make the Spirit Burn" (Bonus Track)	3:26

- The limited edition digipak and US track list contains "Make the Spirit Burn".
- Some Japanese versions contain both bonus tracks with "Make the Spirit Burn" as #13 and "Trial of Flame" as #14.

Credits

- Bjørn Jansson − vocals
- Uli Kusch − drums
- Benny Jansson − guitar, backing vocals
- Kaspar Dahlqvist − keyboards
- Mathias Garnås − bass guitar
