= MK II (Masterplan album) =

Studio album by Masterplan
- Released: 23 February 2007
- Studio: Crazy Cat Studio
- Genre: Power metal
- Length: 52:16
- Label: AFM
- Producer: Masterplan

Masterplan chronology
Aeronautics (2005)	MK II (2007)	Time to Be King (2010)

Professional ratings
Review scores
Source	Rating
AllMusic	3.5/5 stars
Metal Storm	7.5/10
Stormbringer	3/5

MK II is the third album by the German power metal band Masterplan, so called because it features a new band line-up due to the departure of singer Jørn Lande and acclaimed drummer Uli Kusch.

It is the only album to feature former Riot vocalist Mike DiMeo and the first to feature drummer Mike Terrana.

== Track listing ==
All tracks written by Masterplan except where noted.

1. "Phoenix Rising" – 1:17
2. "Warrior's Cry" – 5:21
3. "Lost and Gone" – (Masterplan, Erik Lidbom) – 2:59
4. "Keeps Me Burning" – 4:01
5. "Take Me Over" – 5:42
6. "I'm Gonna Win" – 3:53
7. "Watching the World" – 4:32
8. "Call the Gypsy" – (Masterplan, Erik Lidbom) – 3:08
9. "Trust in You" – 4:47
10. "Masterplan" – 5:03
11. "Enemy" – 4:34
12. "Heart of Darkness" – 6:59
13. "The Master's Voice" (Bonus Track for Russia) – 1:29
14. "Dying Just to Live" (Bonus Track for Russia/Japan) – 5:09

Limited edition includes a music video for "Lost and Gone".

== Personnel ==
- Mike DiMeo – vocals
- Roland Grapow – guitars
- Jan S. Eckert – bass
- Axel Mackenrott – keyboards
- Mike Terrana – drums
