= Talamanca =

Talamanca may refer to:

- Cordillera de Talamanca, a mountain range in Costa Rica and Panama
- Kingdom of Talamanca, a former political entity in present-day Costa Rica
- Talamanca (canton), a canton in Limón, Costa Rica
- Talamanca languages, branch of Chibchan languages spoken in Costa Rica and Panama
- Talamanca (Bages), a municipality in Catalonia, Spain
- Talamanca de Jarama, a municipality in Madrid, Spain
- "Talamanca", a song by Burns (musician)
- Alessandro Figà Talamanca (1938–2023), an Italian mathematician
- Tommy Talamanca (born 1973), an Italian musician
- USS Talamanca, a cargo ship owned by the United Fruit Company, and used by the United States Navy during World War II

== See also ==
- Talamancan montane forests, ecoregion of the Cordillera
