= Dark Chambers of Déjà Vu =

Studio album by Sebastien
- Released: 25 September 2015
- Recorded: Grapow studio, Zvolenská Slatina, Slovakia
- Genre: Power metal Symphonic metal
- Length: 65:02
- Label: Pride & Joy Music
- Producer: Roland Grapow

Sebastien chronology
Tears of White Roses (2010)	Dark Chambers of Déjà Vu (2015)	Act of Creation (2018)

Dark Chambers of Déjà Vu is the second studio album by Czech melodic power metal band Sebastien, released in 2015 under German record label Pride & Joy Music.

The album includes the collaboration of several renowned guest musicians, as Ailyn Gimenez (Sirenia), Martin "Marthus" Skaroupka (Cradle of Filth), Roland Grapow (Masterplan), Tony Martin (ex-Black Sabbath) and Zak Stevens (ex-Savatage), among others.

A special version of the album includes two bonus tracks, "Dorian" (song from their previous album) and "Headless Cross", (Black Sabbath cover) which are the live performances at Masters of Rock festival, recorded on 12 July 2014.

== Track listing ==
- All songs written & arranged by George Rain, Andy Mons, Petri Kallio & Pavel "Dvorkys" Dvorak.
- All lyrics written by Jan Petričko, except "Lamb Of God" by Tony Martin & Jan Petričko.
1. "Stranger at the Door" - 4:14
2. "Highland Romance" - 4:17
3. "Crucifixion of the Heart" - 3:17
4. "Lamb of God" - 3:56
5. "The Wall of Lyman-Alpha" - 3:10
6. "Sphinx in Acheron" - 4:11
7. "Frozen Nightingales" - 4:32
8. "Sleep in the Glass" - 4:06
9. "The Ocean" - 4:30
10. "Man in the Maze" - 3:44
11. "The House of Medusa" - 3:25
12. "My Deepest Winter" - 4:31
13. "Last Dance at Rosslyn Chapel" - 3:56

=== Bonus tracks ===
1. "Dorian" (Live) - 5:41
2. "Headless Cross" (Live) (Black Sabbath cover) - 7:32

== Personnel ==
=== Band members ===
- George Rain – Vocals
- Andy Mons – Guitars
- Petri Kallio – Bass
- Pavel "Dvorkys" Dvorak – Keyboards

=== Guest musicians ===
- Ailyn Gimenez – Vocals (female) (track 13)
- Marlin Rya Poemy – Vocals (female) (track 6)
- Martin "Marthus" Skaroupka – Drums
- Roland Grapow – Vocals (track 12), Vocals (backing)
- Sergey "Filth" Baidikov – Vocals (tracks 1, 10)
- Tony Martin – Vocals (track 4)
- Zak Stevens – Vocals (track 9)

== Production ==
- Roland Grapow – Producer, Recording, Mixing, Mastering
- Jan Petricko – Lyrics
- Tony Martin – Lyrics (track 4)
- Hans Trasid (Dis-Art Design) – Artwork, Design
- Martin Hruby – Photography
- Recorded, mixed and mastered at Grapow Studios in Zvolenská Slatina, Slovakia.
- Acoustic guitars and keyboards recorded at Skala Music Studios in Czech Republic.
