= Anthology (band) =

Slovak symphonic metal band

- Origin: Nižná, Slovakia
- Genres: Symphonic metal, Power metal
- Years active: 2009–present
- Labels: Independent
- Members: Raylyn Shayde; Majo Gonda; Martin Solárik; Miro Grman; Peter Pleva
- Past members: Alexandra Hírešová; Ján Kičín; Marek Štech; Kristián Žilinec
- Website: anthology.sk

Anthology is a symphonic metal band from Slovakia. It was founded by guitarist Marián Gonda and ex-bass player Ján Kičín. They are classified by critics as symphonic and power metal.

== Biography ==
Anthology was founded already in 2008. At the very beginning there was current lead guitarist and composer Marián Gonda with former bass player Ján Kičín. Already in the beginnings, the determination and young boldness was present and Anthology was able step by step to contract real quality players into their lines. Despite their young age, they did not miss the talent.

In 2011, Anthology comes up with its first EP called "Exitus" which was represented by names Alexandra Hírešová – vocals, Majo „Mathias" Gonda – guitar, Miro „Morety“ Grman – guitar, Ján Kičin – bass guitar, Martin „Maarty“ Solárik – keyboard, Peter „Pepo“ Pleva – drums. Song "Exitus" highlighted Anthology's style already in that times which was represented by vocal and guitar melodies with rhythmic accuracy. Sound was mixed by Vladimír Povala. With this EP band performed on one of the biggest festivals in Slovakia – Terchovský Budzogáň, where they showed up as a support band for popular Czech and Slovak rock bands Olympic and Desmod.

Band was in that time playing mostly local shows, which gave them motivation and they decided to move forward in more global way. The time between 2012 and 2013 was hard for the band because of changes on posts of singer. Alexandra has left band twice but in 2013 she has been replaced by charming Raylyn Shayde. Anthology was still considered as young starting band, so they wanted to stop this by bringing new elements into their new album.

In 2014, they came up with album "The Prophecy". Under the mastering and mix has signed well-known Roland Grapow (ex-Helloween, Masterplan). Recording and production was taken by Vladimír Povala and mainly by Michal Jankuliak (EagleHeart). The album was breakthrough in comparison to the first album. Lineup on "The Prophecy" was: “The Prophecy” : Raylyn Shayde – vocal, Majo „Mathias“ Gonda – guitar, Miro „Morety“ Grman – guitar, Marek „Marc“ Štech – bass/ screamo, Martin „Maarty“ Solárik – keyboards a Peter „Pepo“ Pleva – drums. After the album was released, Anthology started to be known around the globe and achieves publicity not only in Slovakia but also in Japan, Denmark, Germany, Finland Canada, Czech Republic, United Kingdom, and in countries of Latin America.

In December 2016, the band has released third studio album "Angel's Revenge". This album shows the band experimenting with many symphonic elements but also some more aggressive features with the addition of guest vocals provided by English death metal vocalist Connor Sanders.

== Band members ==
Current members

- Martin Lofaj - bass guitar (2016–present)
- Lilian Anerousi - vocals (2021–present)
- Marián Gonda – guitar (2008–present)
- Miro Grman – guitar (2009–present)
- Peter Pleva – drums (2008–present)

Former members

- Ľubica Gavlasová (Raylyn Shayde) – vocals (2013–2021)
- Alexandra Hírešová – vocals (2009—2012, 2013—2014)
- Ján Kičín – bass guitar (2008—2013)
- Marek Štech – bass guitar (2013—2014)
- Kristián Žilinec – bass guitar (2014—2016)

Guest members

- Connor Sanders – vocals on Angel's Revenge album (2016)
- Martin Lofaj – bass guitar (live shows) (2016–2017)

== Discography ==
Studio albums

- Exitus (2011)
- The Prophecy (2014)
- Angel's Revenge (2016)

Music videos

- "Scream Into the Darkness" (2014)
- "Last Weep" (2016)
- "Be My Savior" (2025)
- "Sinners in Paradise" (2025)
- "Living in the Lies" (2025)
