= Ronnie Romero =

Chilean singer (born 1981)

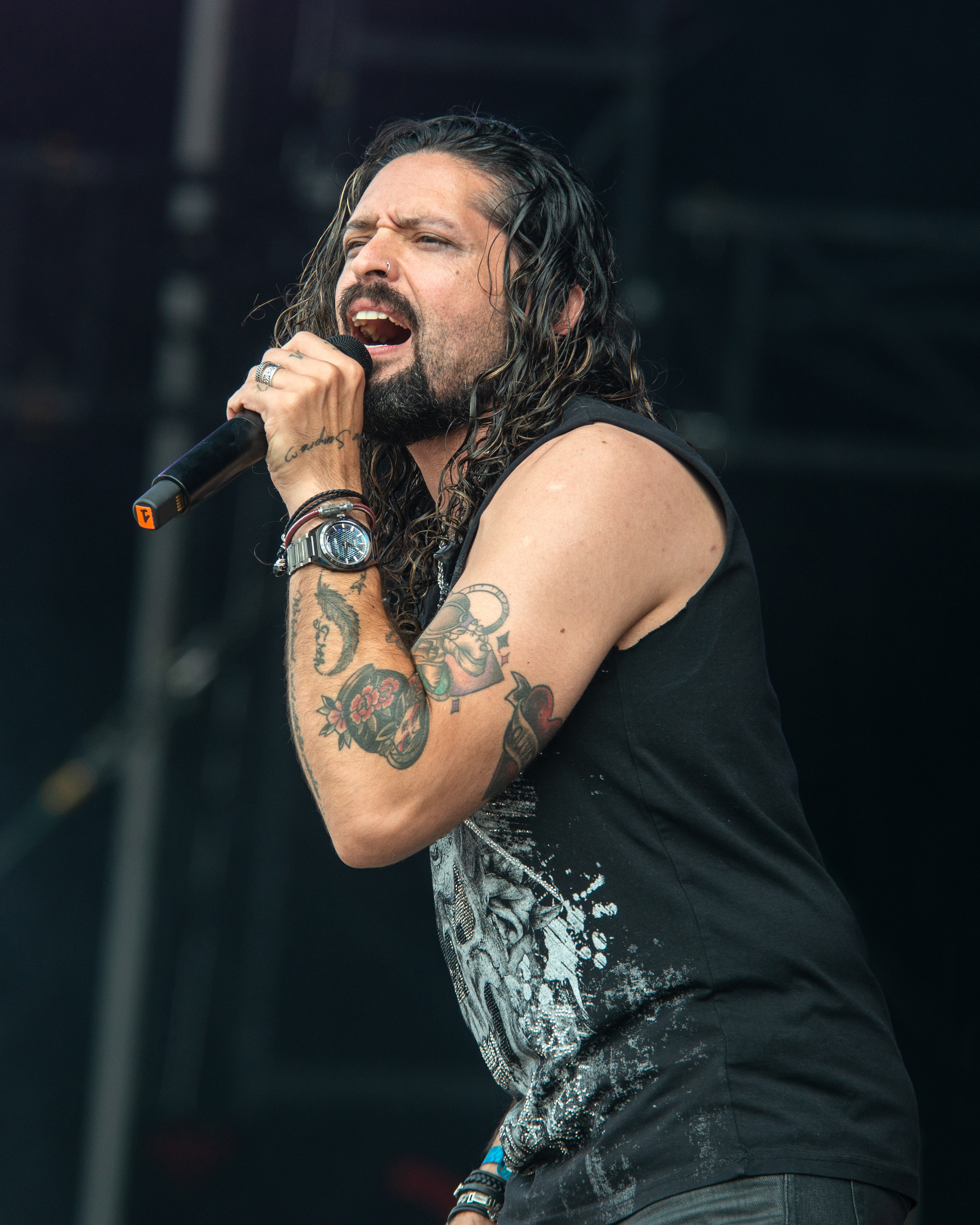
- Romero performing with the Michael Schenker Group in 2022

Background information
- Born: Ronald Romero; 20 November 1981 (age 44); Santiago, Chile
- Origin: Madrid, Spain
- Genres: Rock; blues; folk; country; hard rock; heavy metal
- Occupations: Singer
- Years active: 2010–present
- Member of: Rainbow; Lords of Black; Walter Giardino Temple; The Ferrymen; Michael Schenker Group; Elegant Weapons; Sunstorm
- Formerly of: CoreLeoni; Vandenberg; Intelligent Music Project; Sunstorm

Ronald Romero (born 20 November 1981) is a Chilean singer best known as the vocalist of the rock/heavy metal bands Elegant Weapons, Lords of Black, Rainbow, the Ferrymen, Michael Schenker Group, and Sunstorm. He represented Bulgaria at the Eurovision Song Contest 2022 as the lead singer of Intelligent Music Project.

== Early life ==
Ronnie Romero was born in Santiago, Chile, in 1981. He has lived in Madrid, Spain, since 2009.

== Career ==
=== Lords of Black ===
In 2014, Romero, together with guitarist Tony Hernando, formerly of Spanish band Saratoga, founded the heavy metal band Lords of Black. Romero left the band in 2019 but returned in 2020.

=== Ritchie Blackmore's Rainbow ===
In 2015, Ritchie Blackmore announced his return to rock with a new lineup for his band Rainbow, with Ronnie Romero as the lead singer.

=== Elegant Weapons ===
In 2022, Romero co-founded the metal supergroup Elegant Weapons with Judas Priest guitarist Richie Faulkner, Pantera bassist Rex Brown, and Judas Priest drummer Scott Travis. The band released the album Horns for a Halo in 2023, after which Brown and Travis departed. They were replaced by Accept drummer Christopher Williams and Uriah Heep bassist Dave Rimmer.

=== Other projects ===
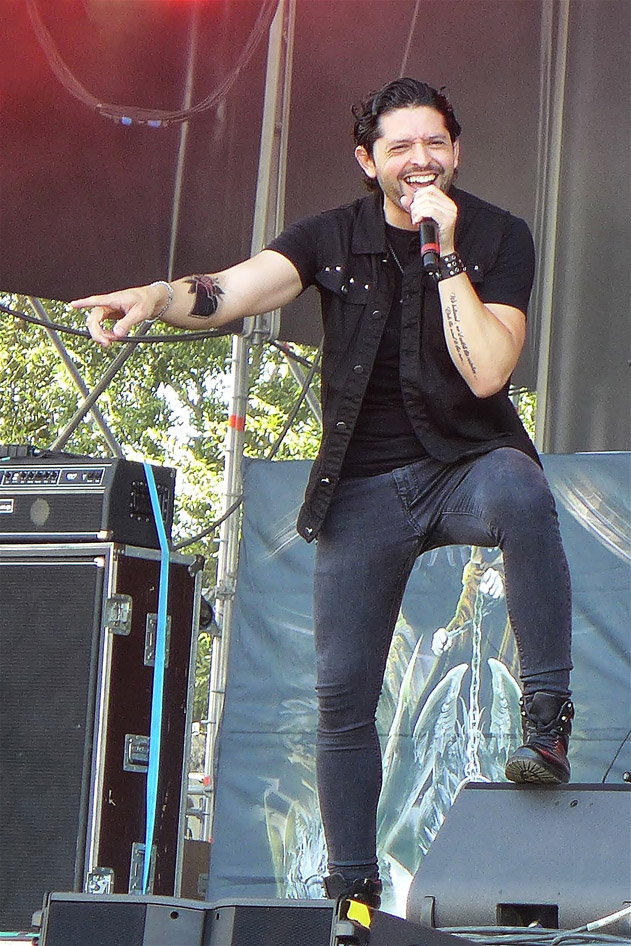
Romero performing with Lords of Black in 2017

CoreLeoni

In 2017, Leo Leoni and Hena Habegger of Swiss hard rock band Gotthard formed a side project titled CoreLeoni, with Romero, whom Leoni had met in 2014, joining on vocals. Romero left the project in 2020.

The Ferrymen

Also in 2017, Romero joined the supergroup the Ferrymen, which additionally includes Magnus Karlsson on guitar and Mike Terrana on drums. They released their self-titled debut album the same year. The trio released their sophomore album, A New Evil, in 2019.

Nozomu Wakai's Destinia

In 2018, Romero sang on the album Metal Souls by Nozomu Wakai's Destinia, a project launched by the Japanese guitarist in 2014.

Michael Schenker Group

In 2020, Michael Schenker announced that Romero would be participating in the upcoming MSG album Immortal, which was released in 2021.

Vandenberg

Also in 2020, Adrian Vandenberg recruited Romero to join his band Vandenberg in recording the album 2020.

Intelligent Music Project

Another new musical venture for Romero in 2020 was the Intelligent Music Project, an enterprise founded by Bulgarian arts patron Milen Vrabevski in 2010. Romero appears on the albums Life Motion (2020), The Creation (2021), and Undonditioned (2022). Romero and the Intelligent Music Project were revealed as Bulgaria's entrant in the Eurovision Song Contest 2022, with the song "Intention".

Adrian Benegas

Romero recorded vocals on the second studio album by Paraguayan heavy metal composer Adrian Benegas, released in May 2023. The record also features input from Spanish singer Zuberoa Aznárez, German drummer Michael Ehré (Primal Fear, Gamma Ray), German producer Sascha Paeth (Avantasia, Kamelot), Tunisian bassist Anis Jouini (Myrath), and Dutch guitarist Timo Somers (Delain, Ayreon).

== Band timeline ==
- Santelmo (2010–2011)
- Jose Rubio's Nova Era (2011–2013)
- Aria Inferno (2012–2013)
- Voces del Rock (2013–2014)
- Lords of Black (2014–2019, 2020–present)
- Ritchie Blackmore's Rainbow (2015–2019)
- Walter Giardino Temple (2017)
- The Ferrymen (2017–present)
- Nozomu Wakai's Destinia (2018)
- CoreLeoni (2018–2020)
- Vandenberg (2020–2021)
- Michael Schenker Group (2020–2023)
- Intelligent Music Project (2020–2023)
- Sunstorm (2020–present)
- Elegant Weapons (2022–present)

== Discography ==
| Date | Artist | Album title | Notes |
|---|---|---|---|
| 2010 | Santelmo | La Tempestad | Demo |
| 2012 | Jose Rubio's Nova Era | Nova Era | Studio |
| 2013 | Jose Rubio's Nova Era | After All | Single |
| 2014 | Lords of Black | Lords of Black | Studio |
| 2016 | Ritchie Blackmore's Rainbow | Memories in Rock – Live in Germany | Live, CD & DVD |
| 2016 | Lords of Black | II | Studio |
| 2017 | Ritchie Blackmore's Rainbow | Live in Birmingham 2016 | Live |
| 2017 | Ritchie Blackmore's Rainbow | I Surrender | Digital single |
| 2017 | The Ferrymen | The Ferrymen | Studio |
| 2018 | Ritchie Blackmore's Rainbow | Memories in Rock II | Live |
| 2018 | Ritchie Blackmore's Rainbow | Waiting for a Sign | Digital single |
| 2018 | Lords of Black | Icons of the New Days | Studio |
| 2018 | Nozomu Wakai's Destinia | Metal Souls | Studio |
| 2018 | CoreLeoni | The Greatest Hits Part 1 | Studio |
| 2019 | Ritchie Blackmore's Rainbow | Black Sheep of the Family | Digital single |
| 2019 | Ritchie Blackmore's Rainbow | The Storm | Digital single |
| 2019 | Ritchie Blackmore's Rainbow | Rainbow Vorwärts | EP |
| 2019 | CoreLeoni | II | Studio |
| 2019 | The Ferrymen | A New Evil | Studio |
| 2019 | Michael Schenker Fest | Revelation | Studio, track 9 |
| 2020 | Vandenberg | 2020 | Studio |
| 2020 | Lords of Black | Alchemy of Souls, Part 1 | Studio |
| 2020 | Intelligent Music Project | Life Motion | Studio |
| 2021 | Michael Schenker Group | Immortal | Studio, tracks 3, 6, 8, 10 |
| 2021 | Sunstorm | Afterlife | Studio |
| 2021 | Intelligent Music Project | The Creation | Studio |
| 2021 | Nozomu Wakai's Destinia | Tokyo Encounter | Live |
| 2021 | Lords of Black | Alchemy of Souls, Part 2 | Studio |
| 2022 | The Ferrymen | One More River to Cross | Studio |
| 2022 | Ronnie Romero | Raised on Radio | Studio, cover |
| 2022 | Intelligent Music Project | Unconditioned | Studio |
| 2022 | Michael Schenker Group | Universal | Studio |
| 2022 | Sunstorm | Brothers in Arms | Studio |
| 2022 | Ronnie Romero & Nozomu Wakai Metal Souls | Memories of Metal Weekend | Live, cover |
| 2023 | Ronnie Romero | Raised on Heavy Radio | Studio, cover |
| 2023 | Elegant Weapons | Horns for a Halo | Studio |
| 2023 | Adrian Benegas | Arcanvm | Studio |
| 2023 | Ronnie Romero | Too Many Lies, Too Many Masters | Studio |
| 2024 | Lords of Black | Mechanics of Predacity | Studio |
| 2024 | Sunstorm | Restless Fight | Studio |
| 2025 | Ronnie Romero | Live at Rock Imperium Festival | Live |
| 2025 | Ronnie Romero | Backbone | Studio |
| 2025 | The Ferrymen | Iron Will | Studio |
| 2026 | Elegant Weapons | Evolution | Studio |

=== Guest appearances ===
| Date | Artist | Album title |
|---|---|---|
| 2013 | Aria Inferno | The Starring Serpent (single) |
| 2014 | Sacramento | A sangre Y fuego |
| 2014 | Legado De Una Tragedia | Legado De Una Tragedia II |
| 2016 | Legado De Una Tragedia | Legado De Una Tragedia II |
| 2017 | FB1964 | Störtebeker |
| 2018 | Renegade | Given Work? |
| 2019 | Chaos Magic | Furyborn |
| 2019 | Sinner | Santa Muerte |
| 2022 | Crystal Ball | Crysteria |
| 2025 | Bonahora | Path of Love |
| 2026 | Gus G | Steel Burner |
