= Lords of Black =

Spanish heavy metal band

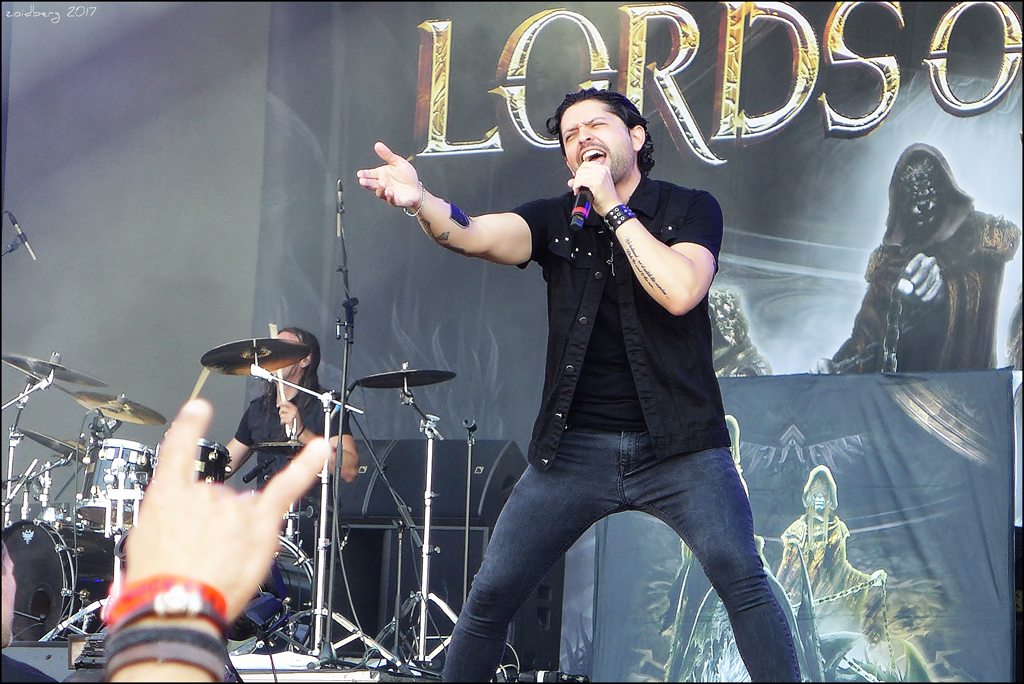
- Lords of Black performing in 2017

Background information
- Origin: Madrid, Spain
- Genres: Power metal; heavy metal; progressive metal; symphonic metal
- Years active: 2014–present
- Labels: Frontiers
- Members: Tony Hernando; Daniel Criado; Johan Nunez; Ronnie Romero
- Past members: Diego Valdez; Víctor Durán; Javi García; Andy C
- Website: lordsofblack.com

Lords of Black is a Spanish heavy metal band formed in Madrid in 2014 by guitarist Tony Hernando and singer Ronnie Romero.

== History ==
=== First album: 2014 ===
In 2014, guitarist Tony Hernando founded Lords of Black together with vocalist Ronnie Romero. They were joined by drummer Andres Cobos (known as Andy C), who had previously played with Hernando in the band Saratoga. Their debut, self-titled album, was released in May 2014. It was produced by Hernando and Roland Grapow.

=== Lords of Black II: 2015–16 ===
Lords of Black received record label attention after Ritchie Blackmore announced that Romero would be fronting the revival of Rainbow. In early 2016, the band signed a contract with the Italian label Frontiers Records, with whom they released their next album, II. Once again, Hernando and Grapow acted as producers, and mixing and mastering was done at Grapow Studios in Slovakia.

In the fall of 2016, Lords of Black conducted their Merciless Over Europe Tour, with intentions to begin writing and producing a follow-up album afterwards.

=== Icons of the New Days, departure of Ronnie Romero: 2017–19 ===
While continuing to tour in support of their second album and making their first appearances at larger festivals such as Wacken and ProgPower USA, the band was writing and recording demos for the third album. The recordings took over a year to conclude and the album, titled Icons of the New Days, was released on 11 May 2018, with "Icons of the New Days" and "World Gone Mad" as singles. In January 2019, Ronnie Romero announced his departure from the band.

=== Alchemy of Souls, Pt. I: 2019–present ===
In February 2019, Argentine vocalist Diego Valdez was announced as Romero's replacement. The band started pre-production for a new album and announced a live performance at Leyendas del Rock Festival. During the performance, they were joined onstage by Croatian singer Dino Jelusick. Additionally, drummer Andy C was replaced by Matt de Vallejo for the duration of the festival.

In May 2020, Lords of Black announced the return of Ronnie Romero and the conclusion of their latest album, Alchemy of Souls, Pt. I. Johan Nunez, who recorded the drums on the album, was announced as the replacement for Andy C.

== Band members ==
Current

- Ronnie Romero – vocals (2014–2019, 2020–present)
- Tony Hernando – guitar (2014–present)
- Daniel Criado – bass (2017–present)
- Johan Nunez – drums (2020–present)

Past

- Diego Valdez – vocals (2019)
- Víctor Durán – bass (2014–2015)
- Javier García – bass (2016–2017)
- Andy C – drums (2014–2020)

== Discography ==
- Lords of Black (2014)
- II (2016)
- Icons of the New Days (2018)
- Alchemy of Souls, Part 1 (2020)
- Alchemy of Souls, Part 2 (2021)
- Mechanics of Predacity (2024)
