= Lords of Black (album) =

2014 studio album by Lords of Black

Studio album by Lords of Black
- Released: 9 May 2014
- Recorded: Estudios "Casa de la Música" - Fuenlabrada (Spain) and Grapow Studios - Zvolenská Slatina, (Slovakia)
- Genre: Power metal; heavy metal; progressive metal; symphonic metal
- Length: 1:00:13
- Label: Independent
- Producer: Tony Hernando; Roland Grapow

Lords of Black chronology
Lords of Black (2014)	II (2016)

Lords of Black is the debut album by Spanish power metal band Lords of Black, released on 9 May 2014 under their own independent record label.

== Track listing ==
All lyrics are written by Tony Hernando; all music is composed by Tony Hernando, except where noted

No.	Title	Writer(s)	Length
1.	"Doomsday Clock (Intro)" (Instrumental)	Tony Hernando	1:45
2.	"Lords of Black"	Tony Hernando	4:53
3.	"Nothing Left to Fear"	Tony Hernando	5:12
4.	"Would You Take Me"	Andy C. / Tony Hernando	4:05
5.	"The World That Came After"	Tony Hernando	3:45
6.	"Too Close to the Edge"	Tony Hernando	4:25
7.	"At the End of the World"	Tony Hernando	4:20
8.	"Forgive or Forget"	Andy C. / Tony Hernando	3:36
9.	"Out of the Dark"	Tony Hernando	4:35
10.	"The Grand Design"	Andy C. / Tony Hernando / Ronnie Romero	3:20
11.	"The Art of Illusions Part I 'Smoke and Mirrors'"	Tony Hernando / Ronnie Romero	5:05
12.	"The Art of Illusions Part II 'The Man From beyond'"	Andy C. / Tony Hernando / Ronnie Romero/	5:30
13.	"When Everything Is Gone"	Tony Hernando	9:58
Total length:			1:00:13

== Personnel ==
- Ronnie Romero – Lead vocals
- Tony Hernando - Guitars, bass, additional keyboards, synths, narrated voices
- Andy C. (Andres Cobos) - Drums, piano

== Production ==
- Tony Hernando - Production
- Anti Horrillo and Dani Ballesteros - Recording engineers
- Roland Grapow - Co-production, recording, mixing, mastering
- Felipe Machado Franco - Cover art
