= PumpKings =

Studio album by Masterplan
- Released: 30 June 2017
- Genre: Power metal
- Length: 63:16
- Label: AFM Records
- Producer: Roland Grapow

Masterplan chronology
Novum Initium (2013)	PumpKings (2017)	Metalmorphosis (2026)

Professional ratings
Review scores
Source	Rating
Metal Express Radio	4/10
MMH Radio	3/5

PumpKings is the sixth studio album by the German power metal band Masterplan, released on 30 June 2017. It is a cover album consisting entirely of songs written by Roland Grapow during his membership in Helloween, re-recorded and re-arranged for the occasion. It is the band's first album with new drummer Kevin Kott. The album has received mixed feedback from critics.

== Track listing ==
No.	Title	Length
1.	"The Chance" (from Pink Bubbles Go Ape)	3:47
2.	"Someone's Crying" (from Pink Bubbles Go Ape)	4:27
3.	"Mankind" (from Pink Bubbles Go Ape)	6:17
4.	"Step Out Of Hell" (from Chameleon)	4:25
5.	"Mr. Ego" (from Master of the Rings)	7:02
6.	"Still We Go" (from Master of The Rings)	5:02
7.	"Escalation 666" (from The Dark Ride)	4:40
8.	"The Time Of The Oath" (from The Time of the Oath)	6:54
9.	"Music" (from Chameleon)	7:27
10.	"The Dark Ride" (from The Dark Ride)	8:51
11.	"Take Me Home" (from Master of the Rings)	4:24

== Line-up ==
- Rick Altzi – vocals
- Roland Grapow – guitar
- Jari Kainulainen – bass
- Kevin Kott – drums
- Axel Mackenrott – keyboards

=== Production ===
- Roland Grapow – production, recording, mixing, mastering at Grapow Studios
