= II (Lords of Black album) =

2016 studio album by Lords of Black

Studio album by Lords of Black
- Released: 18 March 2016
- Recorded: Estudios "Casa de la Música" – Fuenlabrada (Spain) and Grapow Studios, Zvolenská Slatina, (Slovakia)
- Genre: Power metal; heavy metal; progressive metal; symphonic metal
- Length: 1:03:06
- Label: Frontiers Records
- Producer: Tony Hernando; Roland Grapow

Lords of Black chronology
Lords of Black (2014)	II (2016)	Icons of the New Days (2018)

II is the second album by Spanish power metal band Lords of Black, released on 18 March 2016 under Italian record label Frontiers Records.

== Track listing ==
All lyrics are written by Tony Hernando; all music is composed by Tony Hernando, except where noted

No.	Title	Writer(s)	Length
1.	"Malevolently Beautiful (Intro)" (Instrumental)	Tony Hernando	0:48
2.	"Merciless"	Tony Hernando	5:13
3.	"Only One Life Away"	Tony Hernando	6:10
4.	"Everything You're Not"	Andy C. / Tony Hernando	4:20
5.	"New World's Comin'"	Tony Hernando	4:37
6.	"Cry No More"	Tony Hernando	4:52
7.	"Tears I Will Be"	Tony Hernando	6:16
8.	"Insane"	Tony Hernando	4:40
9.	"Live by the Lie, Die by the Truth"	Tony Hernando	4:28
10.	"Ghost of You"	Tony Hernando	9:04
11.	"The Art of Illusions Part III: The Wasteland"	Tony Hernando / Ronnie Romero	4:51
12.	"Shadows of War"	Tony Hernando	4:15
Total length:			1:03:06

Bonus tracks
No.	Title	Lyrics	Music	Length
13.	"Lady of the Lake" (Rainbow cover)	Ronnie James Dio	Dio / Ritchie Blackmore	3:32
14.	"Innuendo" (Queen cover)	Freddie Mercury / Roger Taylor	Freddie Mercury	6:14
Total length:				9:46

== Personnel ==
- Ronnie Romero – lead vocals
- Tony Hernando – guitars, bass, additional keyboards, synths, narrated voices
- Andy C. (Andres Cobos) – drums, piano

=== Guest musicians ===
- Victor Díez – piano on "New Worlds Comin'", "Tears I Will Be", "Insane (Acoustic Version)"

== Production ==
- Tony Hernando – production
- Roland Grapow – co-production, recording, mixing, mastering
- Anti Horrillo, Daniel Luna, and Miguel Sanz – recording and engineering
- Felipe Machado Franco – cover art
- Manuel Giménez Caballero –layout designs
- Antonio Garci – photography
