= Leading Far from a Mistake =

Studio album by Daedalus
- Released: October 2003
- Recorded: 2003, Genoa, Italy
- Genre: Progressive metal
- Length: 41:10
- Label: New LM Records

Daedalus chronology
Leading Far from a Mistake (2003)	The Never Ending Illusion (2009)

Leading Far from a Mistake is the first studio album from Italian Progressive metal band Daedalus. Compared with the standard features of the genre, this work tries to introduce some original elements, using electronic and ambient music.

== Track listing ==
No.	Title	Writer(s)	Length
1.	"Darkness"	Gremo	1:43
2.	"Masquerade"	Gremo, Rinaldi	6:21
3.	"Time"	Gremo, Rinaldi	4:50
4.	"Rem 8"	Gremo	6:21
5.	"Leading Far From a Mistake"	Gremo	10:39
6.	"New 64"	Gremo	4:05
7.	"Raining"	Gremo	5:16
8.	"Flowers on Icarus' Tomb"	Gremo	1:50

== Credits ==
- Alessio Brunetti – vocals
- Andrea Rinaldi – guitar
- Fabio Gremo – bass
- Giuseppe Spanò – synth
- Davide La Rosa – drums
