= Metalmorphosis =

Studio album by Masterplan
- Released: 26 June 2026
- Recorded: 2024–2025
- Genre: Power metal
- Length: 50:39
- Label: Frontiers Records
- Producer: Roland Grapow

Masterplan chronology
PumpKings (2017)	Metalmorphosis (2026)

Professional ratings
Review scores
Source	Rating
Dead Rhetoric	7.5/10
Heavy Music HQ	3/5
Metal Express Radio	7/10
Powermetal.de	7.5/10

Metalmorphosis is the seventh studio album by German power metal band Masterplan, released on 26 June 2026. It is their first release since their 2017 cover album PumpKings, and was originally scheduled to be released a month earlier, on 22 May 2026. The song "Chase the Light" was released as a single in advance on 10 February 2026.

== Track listing ==
All songs written by Masterplan except "Shadow Man" and "The Call" written by Adam Mičinec / Roland Grapow, and "Through the Storm" written by Fredrik Groth / Roland Grapow.

No.	Title	Length
1.	"Chase the Light"	5:47
2.	"Electric Nights"	4:40
3.	"Shadow Man"	3:52
4.	"Bound to Fall"	4:25
5.	"Pain of Yesterday"	4:52
6.	"Metalmorphosis"	5:28
7.	"Through the Storm"	4:15
8.	"Ghostlight"	4:47
9.	"The Call"	8:15
10.	"Rise Again"	4:18

== Personnel ==
- Rick Altzi – vocals
- Roland Grapow – guitars
- Jari Kainulainen – bass
- Kevin Kott – drums
- Axel Mackenrott – keyboards

=== Production ===
- Roland Grapow – production, recording, mixing, mastering at Grapow Studios

== Charts ==
Chart performance for Metalmorphosis
Chart (2026)	Peak position
French Physical Albums (SNEP)	143
French Rock & Metal Albums (SNEP)	39
Swedish Hard Rock Albums (Sverigetopplistan)	5
Swedish Physical Albums (Sverigetopplistan)	3
Swiss Albums (Schweizer Hitparade)	42
