= Elegant Weapons =

American-British metal supergroup

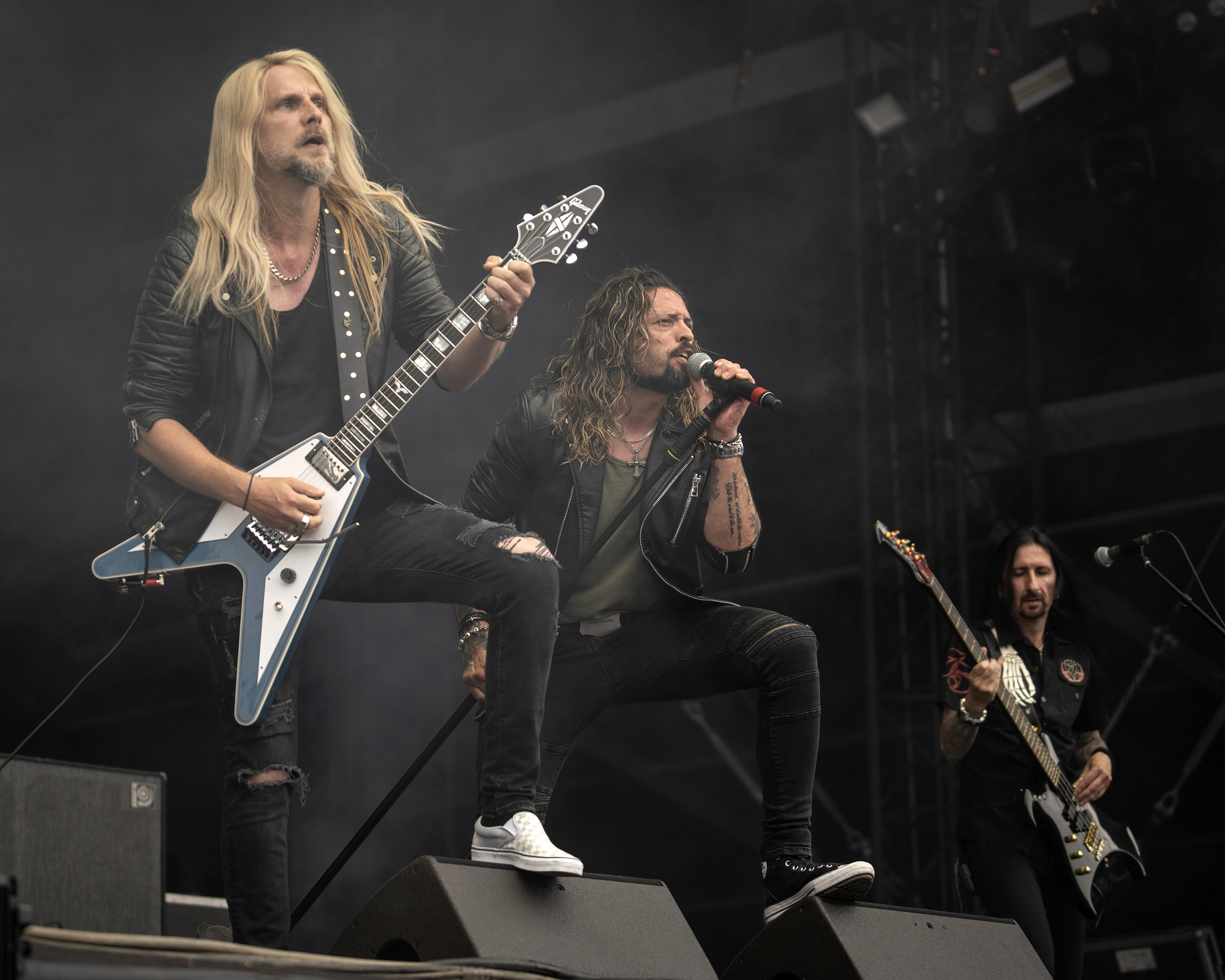
- Elegant Weapons performing in 2023. L–R: Richie Faulkner, Ronnie Romero, Dave Rimmer

Background information
- Genres: Heavy metal
- Years active: 2022–present
- Label: Nuclear Blast
- Members: Richie Faulkner; Ronnie Romero; Dave Rimmer; Christopher Williams
- Past members: Rex Brown; Scott Travis
- Website: Official website

Elegant Weapons is a heavy metal supergroup composed of guitarist Richie Faulkner of Judas Priest, vocalist Ronnie Romero of Rainbow and the Michael Schenker Group, drummer Christopher Williams of Accept, and bassist Dave Rimmer of Uriah Heep. The band announced their formation on 25 October 2022, originally with bassist Rex Brown of Pantera and drummer Scott Travis of Judas Priest.

== Horns for a Halo ==
The band's debut album, Horns for a Halo, produced by Andy Sneap, was released on 26 May 2023 by Nuclear Blast. The debut single, "Blind Leading the Blind", came out on 24 February 2023. The second single, "Do or Die", was released on 14 April 2023. Rex Brown from Pantera played bass on the album, and Scott Travis of Judas Priest contributed drums. It was ranked as one of the best debut albums of 2023 by Classic Rock magazine.

== Band members ==
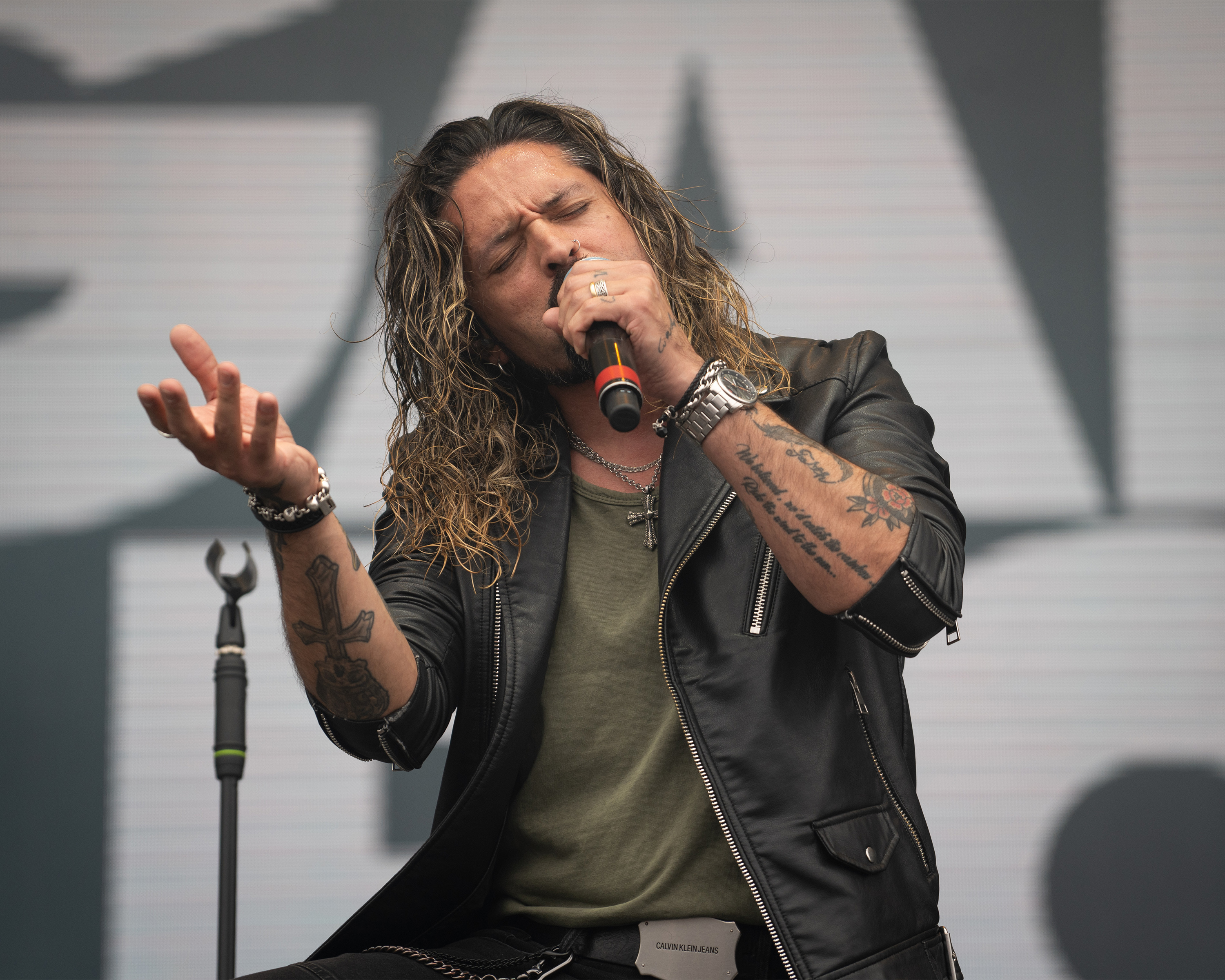
Romero

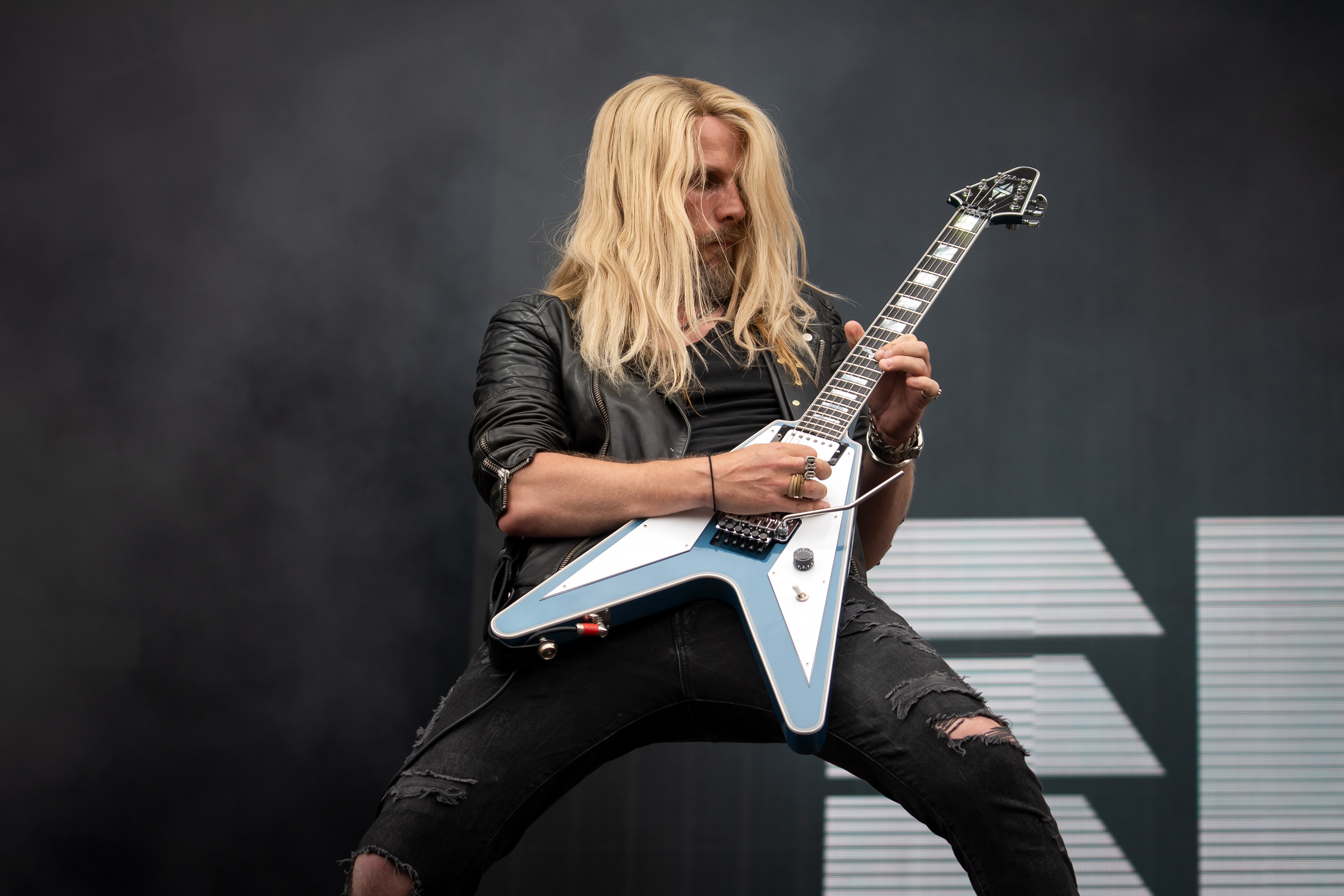
Faulkner

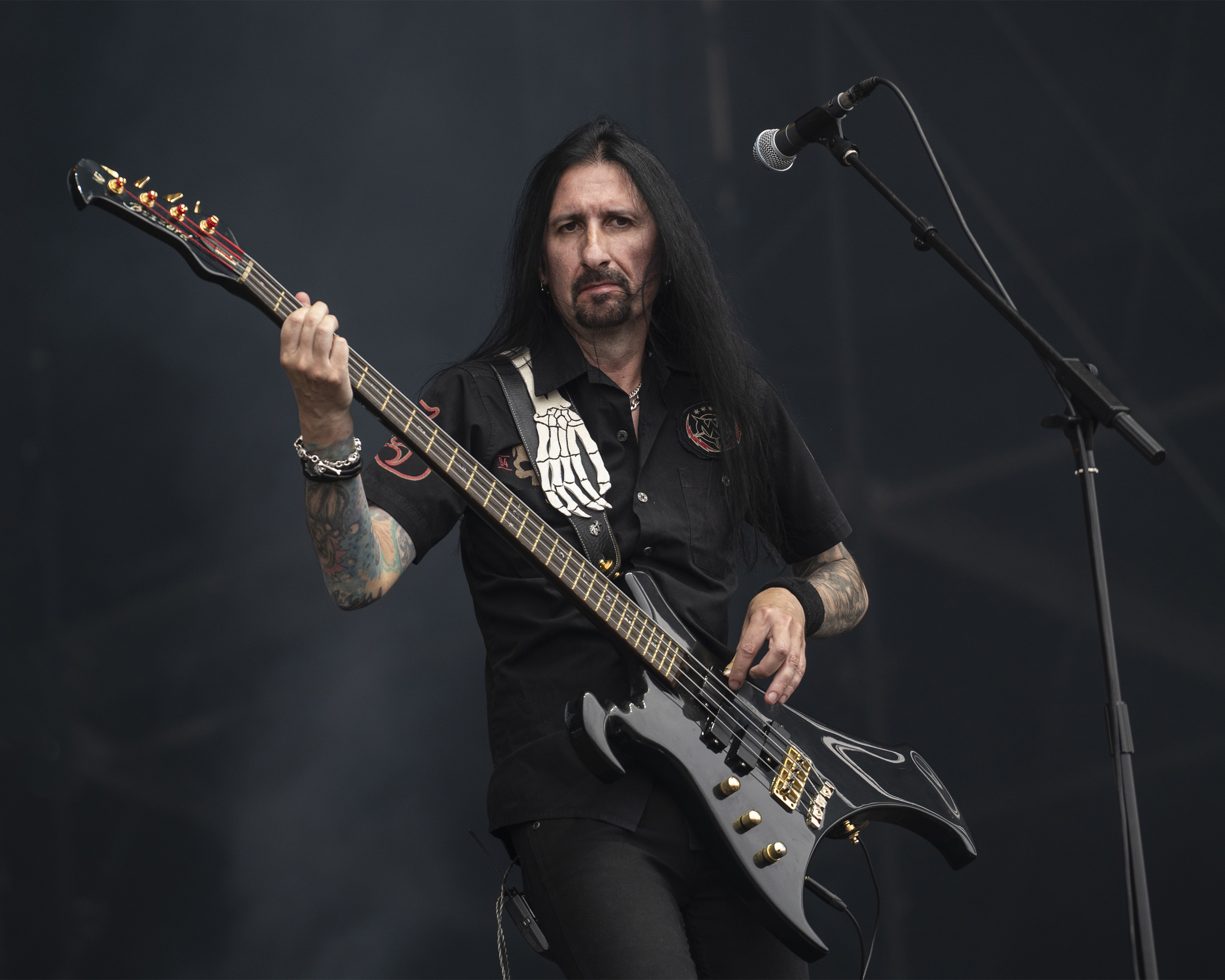
Rimmer

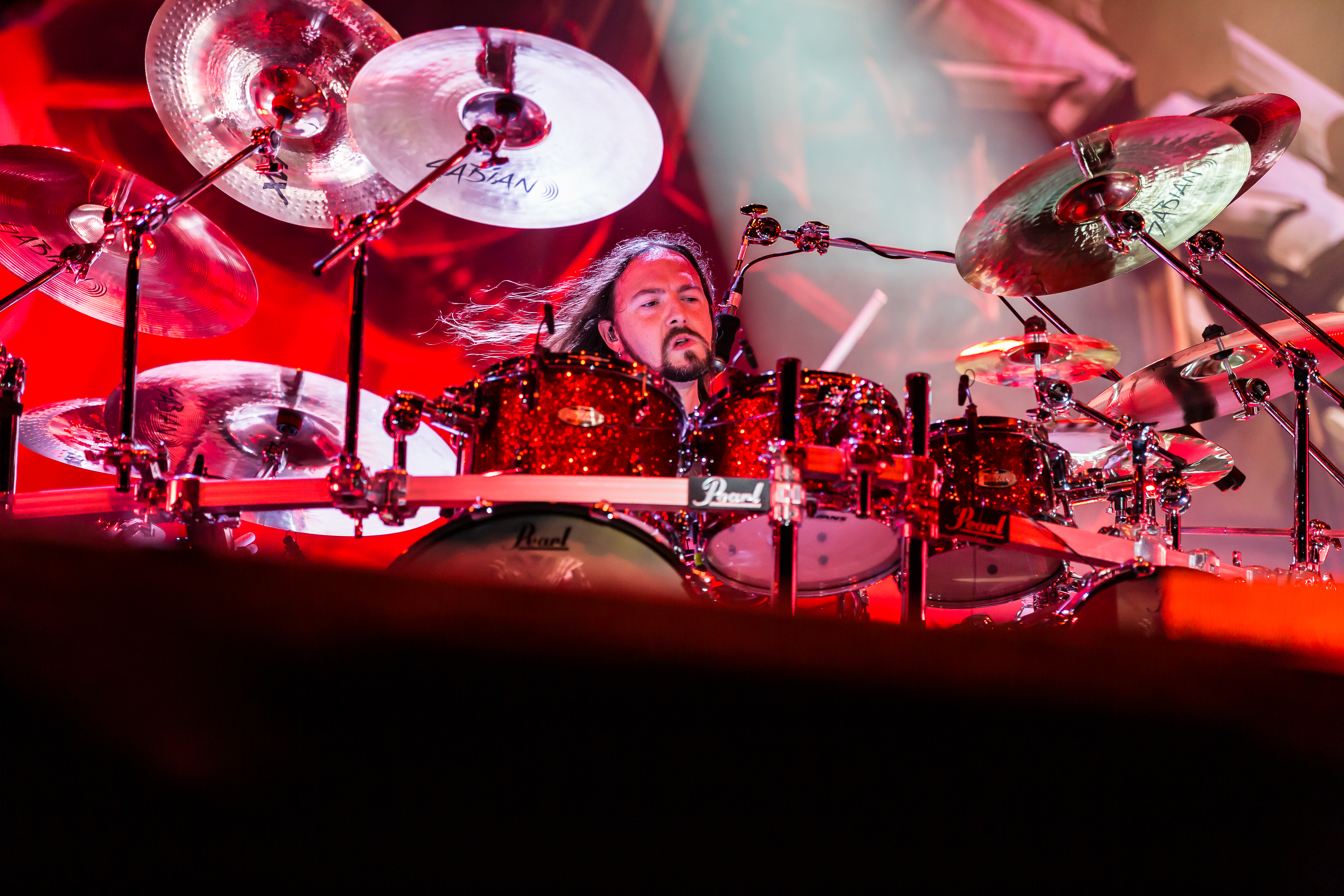
Williams

Current

- Richie Faulkner – guitars (2022–present)
- Ronnie Romero – vocals (2022–present)
- Dave Rimmer – bass (2023–present)
- Christopher Williams – drums (2023–present)

Past

- Rex Brown – bass (2022–2023)
- Scott Travis – drums (2022–2023)

== Discography ==
Studio albums

- Horns for a Halo (2023)
- Evolution (2026)
