= Novum Initium =

Studio album by Masterplan
- Released: 14 June 2013
- Genre: Power metal
- Length: 51:09
- Label: AFM
- Producer: Roland Grapow

Masterplan chronology
| Time to Be King (2010) | Novum Initium (2013) | PumpKings (2017) |

Professional ratings
Review scores
| Source | Rating |
|---|---|
| 100% Rock | 9/10 |
| Dead Rhetoric | 7.5/10 |
| Metal Express Radio | 7.5/10 |
| Stormbringer | 4.5/5 |

Novum Initium is the fifth album by German power metal band Masterplan, released on June 14, 2013. In a 2012 interview with producer Roland Grapow over the then-upcoming album, he stated that "We are looking for a more powerful album this time... still with great melodies and feelings, but also with more orchestration and faster stuff again… just more metal."

== Track listing ==
| No. | Title | Length |
|---|---|---|
| 1. | "Per Aspera Ad Astra" | 1:01 |
| 2. | "The Game" | 5:28 |
| 3. | "Keep Your Dream Alive" | 3:49 |
| 4. | "Black Night of Magic" | 3:43 |
| 5. | "Betrayal" | 4:42 |
| 6. | "No Escape" | 4:24 |
| 7. | "Pray on My Soul" | 4:37 |
| 8. | "Earth Is Going Down" | 3:42 |
| 9. | "Return from Avalon" | 4:27 |
| 10. | "Through Your Eyes" | 4:59 |
| 11. | "Novum Initium" | 10:17 |

Digipack limited edition bonus tracks
| No. | Title | Length |
|---|---|---|
| 12. | "1492" | 3:48 |
| 13. | "Fear the Silence" | 3:48 |

Japanese edition bonus track
| No. | Title | Length |
|---|---|---|
| 14. | "Killing in Time" (re-recording; originally from the Back My Life 2004 EP) | 4:33 |

== Line-up ==
- Rick Altzi - vocals
- Roland Grapow - guitars, co-vocals on #11
- Jari Kainulainen - bass
- Martin Škaroupka - drums
- Axel Mackenrott - keyboards
