= Masterplan (Masterplan album) =

Studio album by Masterplan
- Released: 20 January 2003
- Recorded: Crazy Cat Studio
- Genre: Power metal
- Length: 52:20
- Label: AFM
- Producers: Andy Sneap and Masterplan

Masterplan chronology
Masterplan (2003)	Aeronautics (2005)

Professional ratings
Review scores
Source	Rating
AllMusic	4.5/5 stars
Rock Hard	(9.5/10)

Masterplan is the German power metal band Masterplan's self-titled debut album, released in 2003 by AFM Records. The album received many good reviews and entered the charts at high positions. The album was voted album of the month in Sweden Rock Magazine, Rock Hard and Heavy, Oder Was?! in Germany and Metal Factory in Switzerland. The band received the "European Border Breakers Award" in 2004 from the European Commission, for the album sales around Europe.

By the time their first full-length and self-titled CD was released in 2003, keyboard player Janne "Warman" Wirman was replaced by Axel Mackenrott. Wirman recorded some session keyboards for the album, but could not stay on as a full-time member due to his commitments to Children of Bodom. The main keyboard lines of the album were arranged and programmed by guitarist Roland Grapow and drummer Uli Kusch. Missing a proper bass player, Grapow recorded the bass parts, with some help from session bassist Jürgen Attig (Casanova). Grapow has since revealed that Helloween bassist Markus Grosskopf unwittingly played on the track "Into the Light", since Helloween had tried recording the track for The Dark Ride and the bass track from that session was used. Permanent bassist Jan-Sören Eckert joined shortly after the album's release. Despite not playing on the album, Mackenrott and Eckert both appear in the album sleeve.

Michael Kiske, the former Helloween bandmate of Roland Grapow, duets on the track "Heroes".

== Reception ==
In 2005, Masterplan was ranked number 491 in Rock Hard magazine's book The 500 Greatest Rock & Metal Albums of All Time.

== Track listing ==
All songs were written by Masterplan, except where noted.

No.	Title	Length
1.	"Spirit Never Die"	5:26
2.	"Enlighten Me"	4:37
3.	"Kind Hearted Light"	4:25
4.	"Crystal Night"	5:16
5.	"Soulburn"	6:15
6.	"Heroes" (feat. Michael Kiske)	3:33
7.	"Sail On"	4:37
8.	"Into the Light" (M&L: Masterplan / Rainer Laws)	4:09
9.	"Crawling from Hell"	4:13
10.	"Bleeding Eyes"	5:41
11.	"When Love Comes Close"	4:08
Total length:		52:20

Bonus Track Listing
No.	Title	Length
1.	"Through Thick and Thin" (Japanese Version, as track # 6, South American version, track #12)	4:03
2.	"The Kid Rocks On" (Japanese Version, as track # 9)	3:37
3.	"Black Dog (Led Zeppelin cover)" (South American version, track #13)	4:35
Total length:		64:35

== Personnel ==
- Jørn Lande – vocals
- Roland Grapow – guitar, bass, keyboards arrangement and program
- Uli Kusch – drums, keyboards arrangement and program

Guest musicians

- Michael Kiske – vocals on track 6
- Janne Wirman – keyboards on all tracks
- Ferdy Doernberg – keyboards on track 8
- Jürgen Attig – bass on B-sides

Production

- Produced by Andy Sneap and Masterplan
- Recorded by Andy Sneap at Crazy Cat Studio, Hamburg (GER)
- Mixed by Mikko Karmila at Finnvox Studio, Helsinki (FIN)
- Mastered by Mika Jussila at Finnvox Studio, Helsinki (FIN)
- Bandphotos by Dirk Schelpmeier
- Artwork and booklet design by Rainer Laws
- Album cover and band logo by Thomas Ewerhard
