= Sebastien (band) =

Czech power metal band

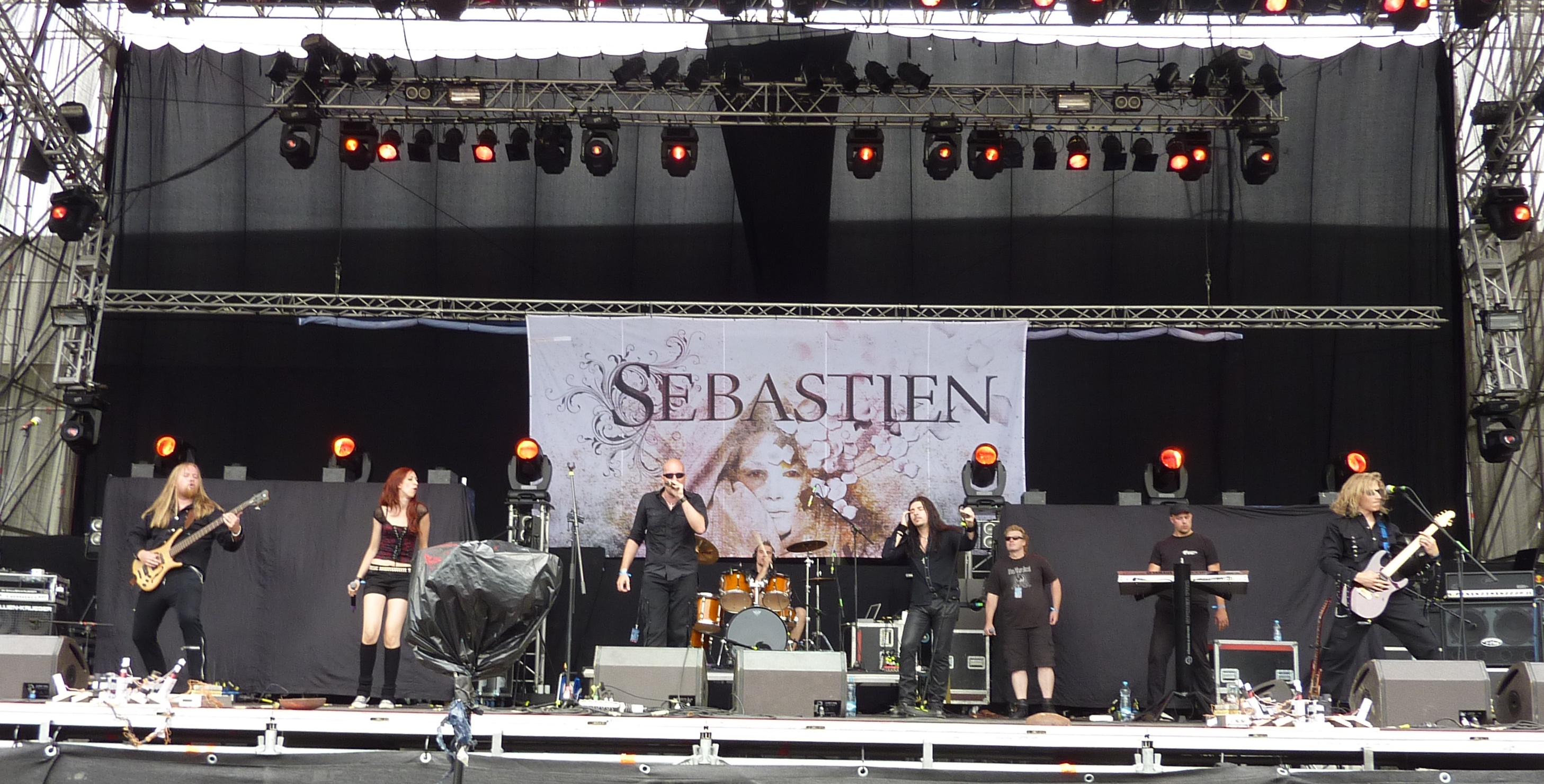
- Sebastien + guests at Masters of Rock 2012

Background information
- Origin: Pardubice/Brno, Czech Republic
- Genres: Progressive metal; power metal; symphonic metal
- Years active: 2008–present
- Label: Escape Music
- Members: Jiří Rain; Andy Mons; Petri Kallio; Pavel Dvořák; Lukáš Říha
- Past members: Peter Forge; Rob Vrsansky; Victor Mazanek; Radek Rain
- Website: www.sebastienofficial.com

Sebastien is a Czech power metal band from Pardubice and Brno. The band was formed by Jiří "George" Rain in 2008.

== Biography ==
Sebastien's origins date back to February 1999 and the band's first real line-up appears under the name Calypso in December 1999.

Two years later, they changed their name to Navar and recorded their first studio album, titled Dark. This was followed by a string of concerts, the recording of the single "Shine of Light", and finally the release of their second album, Commotion.

In the summer of 2004, the band returned to the studio again to record the EP Proti všem (Against all). In April 2006, they self-released a new album, titled 1621.

In 2008, two members left the group. The core of the band - the Rain brothers and Andy Mons - invited new members. The band was then renamed Sebastien.

In November 2009, Sebastien travelled to Grapow Studios in Slovakia to record their long-awaited album Tears of White Roses. The songs were originally written in Czech by George Rain, and later rewritten in English by poet Jan Petričko. The music was written and arranged by George Rain and Andy Mons, and the album was produced by Roland Grapow.

The album was released in November 2010 via Escape Music and featured several guest musicians.

Sebastien went on their first real tour (in the Czech Republic and Slovakia) in the fall of 2011. Following this, they appeared on the main "Ronnie James Dio Stage" of the Masters of Rock festival in July 2012 with three notable guest artists on stage: Roland Grapow, Apollo Papathanasio (Spiritual Beggars), and Katie Joanne (Siren's Cry).

As of 2012, keyboardist Victor Mazanek has left the band. He has been replaced by Pavel Dvořák of Warhawk. In 2012, Radek Rain also resigned and was replaced by Lukáš Říha.

In 2014, the band played their next big gig at the Masters of Rock’s main stage – this time with Tony Martin (ex-Black Sabbath) as a special guest.

In November 2014, Sebastien entered Grapow Studios again to finish the mix on their second album, titled Dark Chambers of Déjà Vu. The album was released on 25 September 2015, almost five years since their previous record, on the label Pride & Joy Music.

The band's third album, Act of Creation, was released on 23 February 2018.

== Band members ==
- Jiří Rain - lead vocals, guitar (1999−present)
- Andy Mons - guitar, backing vocals (2003−present)
- Petri Kallio - bass, backing vocals (2010−present)
- Pavel Dvořák - keyboards (2012−present)
- Lukáš Říha - drums (2013−present)

=== Former members ===
- Peter Forge - bass (2008−2010)
- Rob Vrsansky - keyboards (2008−2010)
- Victor Mazanek - keyboards, backing vocals (2010-2012)
- Radek Rain - drums (2003-2012)

=== Guest musicians ===
- Amanda Somerville − vocals on "Femme Fatale" and "Black Rose - part II" (Tears of White Roses)
- Apollo Papathanasio − vocals on "Silver Water" (Tears of White Roses), live appearance with Sebastien at Masters of Rock 2012 (vocals)
- Doogie White − vocals on "Black Rose - part I" (Tears of White Roses)
- Fabio Lione − vocals on "Dorian" and "Fields of Chlum (1866 A.D.)" (Tears of White Roses)
- Mike DiMeo − vocals on "Voices in Your Heart" and "Tears of White Roses" (Tears of White Roses)
- Roland Grapow − solo guitar on "Voices in Your Heart", vocals on "Dorian" and "Phoenix Rising" (Tears of White Roses), live appearance with Sebastien at Masters of Rock 2012 and 2014 (vocals only)
- Tore Moren − solo guitar on "Museé Du Satan Rouge" (Tears of White Roses)
- Katie Joanne − live appearance with Sebastien at Masters of Rock 2012 (vocals)
- Tony Martin − live appearance with Sebastien at Masters of Rock 2014 (vocals)
- Ailyn Giménez − vocals on "Last Dance at Rosslyn Chapel" (Dark Chambers of Déjà Vu)
- Martin "Marthus" Skaroupka - drums (Dark Chambers of Déjà Vu)

== Discography ==
As Navar

- Dark (LP - 2001)
- Commotion (LP)
- Proti všem (EP - 2004)
- 1621 (LP - 2006)

=== Studio albums ===
- Tears of White Roses (2010)
- Dark Chambers of Déjà Vu (2015)
- Act of Creation (2018)
- Integrity (2020)
- Quo Vadis (2024)

=== EP's ===
- Závidím (2008)
