= Aeronautics (album) =

Studio album by Masterplan
- Released: 31 January 2005
- Recorded: Crazy Cat Studio
- Genre: Power metal
- Length: 50:06
- Label: AFM
- Producers: Andy Sneap and Masterplan

Masterplan chronology
Masterplan (2003)	Aeronautics (2005)	MK II (2007)

Professional ratings
Review scores
Source	Rating
AllMusic	3.5/5 stars

Aeronautics is the second album by the German power metal band Masterplan. It's the first album to feature playing and songwriting by members Axel Mackenrott (keyboards) and Iron Savior bassist Jan S. Eckert, who both joined the band shortly after the recordings of the debut album.

The song "After This War" is a re-written version of an homonymous Iron Savior song which is on the album Dark Assault and was written by Jan S. Eckert and Piet Sielck.

== Track listing ==
All tracks are written by Masterplan, except "After this War, co-written by Piet Sielck.

Aeronautics track listing
No.	Title	Length
1.	"Crimson Rider"	3:59
2.	"Back for My Life"	4:12
3.	"Wounds"	4:01
4.	"I'm Not Afraid"	5:29
5.	"Headbanger's Ballroom"	4:55
6.	"After This War"	3:51
7.	"Into the Arena"	4:11
8.	"Dark from the Dying"	4:09
9.	"Falling Sparrow"	5:35
10.	"Black in the Burn"	9:44
Total length:		50:06

Bonus tracks
No.	Title	Length
1.	"Treasure World" (Digipack Edition, as track # 11)	3:49
2.	"Love is a Rock" (Japanese Version, as track # 6)	4:31
3.	"Hopes and Dreams" (Japanese Version, as track # 12)	2:04
Total length:		60:30

== Line-up ==
- Jørn Lande – vocals
- Roland Grapow – guitar
- Jan S. Eckert – bass
- Axel Mackenrott – keyboards
- Uli Kusch – drums

=== Production personnel ===
- Produced by Andy Sneap and Masterplan
- Recorded by Andy Sneap and Roland Grapow at Crazy Cat Studio, Hamburg (GER)
- Mixed by Mikko Karmila at Finnvox Studio, Helsinki (FIN)
- Mastered by Mika Jussila at Finnvox Studio, Helsinki (FIN)
- Bandphotos by Dirk Schelpmeier
- Layout & Album cover by Thomas Ewerhard
