= Tears of White Roses =

Studio album by Sebastien
- Released: 19 November 2010
- Recorded: Grapow studio, Zvolenská Slatina, Slovakia
- Genre: Power metal Symphonic metal
- Length: 46:57
- Label: Escape Music
- Producer: Roland Grapow

Sebastien chronology
Tears of White Roses (2010)	Dark Chambers of Déjà Vu (2015)

Professional ratings
Review scores
Source	Rating
Dangerdog	4.75/5
Stormbringer	4.5/5 stars
Sea of Tranquility	3/5 stars
Melodic Rock Inside	4.5/5 stars

Tears of White Roses is the debut album by Sebastien, melodic power metal band from Czech Republic, released in 2010.

== Track listing ==
- All songs written by George Rain & Andy Mons
- All lyrics written by Jan Petričko
1. "Museé Du Satan Rouge" - 3:47
2. "Femme Fatale" - 4:15
3. "Dorian" - 4:14
4. "Remiel in Flames" - 4:09
5. "Tears of White Roses" - 4:03
6. "Phoenix Rising" - 3:27
7. "Voices in Your Heart" - 3:28
8. "Fields of Chlum (1866 A.D.)" - 4:33
9. "Lake of Dreams" - 3:49
10. "Silver Water" - 5:02
11. "Black Rose - part I" - 3:14
12. "Black Rose - part II" - 2:56

== Band info ==
=== Band members ===
- George Rain - vocals, guitars
- Andy Mons - guitars
- Petri Skalainen - bass
- Victor Mazanek - keyboards
- Radek Rain - drums

=== Guest musicians ===
- Amanda Somerville - vocal
- Apollo Papathanasio - vocal
- Doogie White - vocal
- Fabio Lione - vocal
- Mike DiMeo - vocal
- Roland Grapow - guitar, vocal
- Tore Moren - guitar

== Production ==
- Produced by Roland Grapow
- Engineered and mixed by Roland Grapow at Grapow Studios in Zvolenská Slatina, Slovakia.
- Cover art and logo design: DisArt Design
