= Tommy Talamanca =

Italian guitarist (born 1973)

- Born: 1973 (age 52–53)
- Genres: Progressive Death Metal; Jazz fusion Flamenco
- Instruments: Electric guitar, Keyboards
- Years active: 1991-

Tommy Talamanca is an Italian guitar virtuoso, keyboard player, and a sound engineer and producer, most famous for his work in Italian death metal band Sadist. He is notable for his ability as a music producer and engineer, but also for his talent of playing a six or seven string guitar and the key board simultaneously.

== Biography ==
Talamanca started playing guitar at the age of 11. He joined a metal band Sadist (now one of the most famous Italian death metal bands) in 1991, and has been in the band ever since. He plays both guitar and keyboard simultaneously in the band. During his spare time he started a small analog recording studio in 1996, named Nadir Recording Studio. The small studio grew up, and actually moved in a building with two studios, four rehearsal rooms and a big live area. Currently, Nadir Music Srl is a company involved multiple music projects, and works with international jazz artists as well as hard rock ones.

Tommy Talamanca is a session player for various bands, including Thefamili, Metal gang, Infection Code, Nerve, and Dirty Balls. He is also a live engineer for Trio Bobo, Drummeria, Nerve, Ritual of Rebirth, Infection Code, Dark Lunacy, Kirlian Camera, and a producer for Sadist, Dark Lunacy, Athlantis, Nerve, Ritual of Rebirth, and Thefamili. He also contributed to Obscura's highly acclaimed album Omnivium, playing a guitar solo on the song "Euclidean Elements".

In 2013 the multi-instrumentalist released his solo debut Na zapad, in collaboration with Italian drummer Emiliano Olcese. Talamanca recorded electric guitar, acoustic guitar, classical guitar, electric bass, acoustic bass, bouzouki, synthesizer, piano, duduk, djembe, tabla, maracas, kora and bodhrán.

== Discography ==
- Sadist - Above the Light (1993)
- Sadist - Tribe (1996)
- Sadist - Crust (1997)
- Sadist - Lego (2000)
- Sadist - Sadist (2007)
- Sadist - Season in Silence (2010)
- Tommy Talamanca - Na zapad (2013)
- Sadist - Hyaena (2015)
