= Roland Grapow =

German guitarist and producer (born 1959)

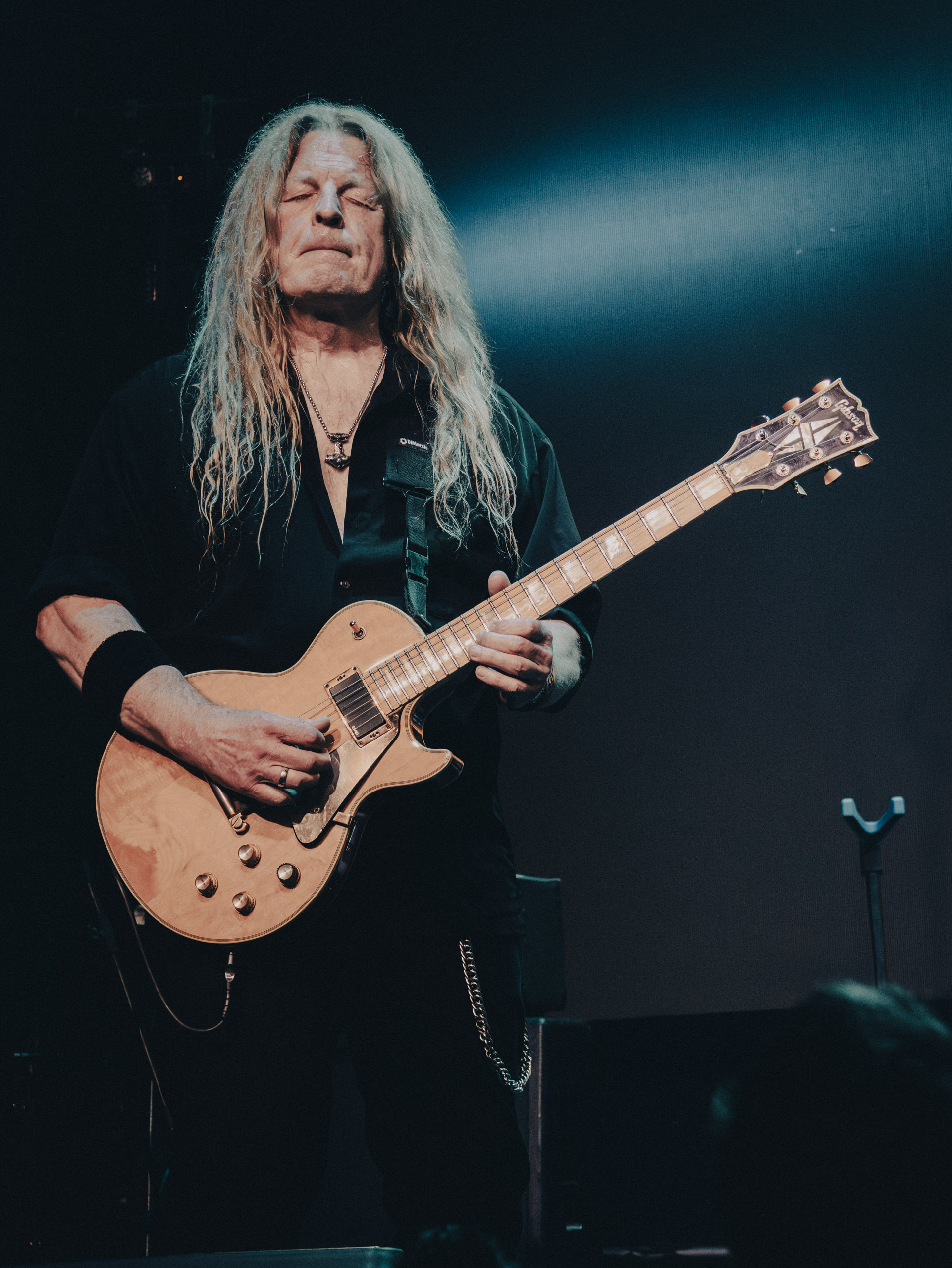
- Grapow in 2026

Background information
- Born: 30 August 1959 (age 66); Hamburg, West Germany
- Genres: Power metal
- Occupations: Musician; record producer
- Instruments: Guitar; vocals
- Years active: 1980–present
- Labels: Snapper; SPV/Steamhammer
- Member of: Masterplan
- Formerly of: Rampage; Helloween; Kreyson; Level 10
- Website: masterplan-theband.com

Roland Grapow (born 30 August 1959 in Hamburg) is a German guitarist and music producer. He is best known for his time in the power metal band Helloween, with which he played for twelve years, after replacing founding member Kai Hansen. He subsequently created the power metal band Masterplan in 2001, which is still active today.

== Life and career ==
=== Early years ===
Grapow started playing guitar at age 12. His father bought him a guitar and had him take lessons, but Grapow couldn't stand the theory part and his teacher told his father that the boy didn't have any talent for guitar playing.

=== Helloween ===
Prior to joining Helloween, Grapow was a member of the heavy metal band Rampage. He joined the band in roughly 1979, and played on two of their studio albums: Victim of Rock in 1980 and Love Lights Up the Night in 1982. He left Rampage around 1983. He was then fairly inactive musically, and made a living as a car mechanic until Michael Weikath called him to offer him a position in Helloween in 1989. According to Grapow in 2017, "If Weiki didn't call me at that time, I would still be a car mechanic and I'd be an old guy with heavy bones and pain, still working on cars, dreaming about my hobby I had a long time ago, being a musician." Grapow played on the Helloween albums Pink Bubbles Go Ape, Chameleon, Master of the Rings, The Time of the Oath, High Live, Better Than Raw, Metal Jukebox, and The Dark Ride.

=== Solo work, Masterplan ===
During his time with the band, Grapow also formed a solo project. The first release, The Four Seasons of Life, featured members of Helloween playing backup, with Grapow trying his hand at singing in addition to playing guitar. On the second album, Kaleidoscope, current and former members of Yngwie Malmsteen's band participated.

In 2001, Grapow and bandmate Uli Kusch were fired from Helloween due to musical and personal differences. In 2012, in an interview with Metal Shock Finland's chief editor Mohsen Fayyazi, Grapow stated:

I felt very secure in Helloween. In the middle of the tour I said something to Michael and Markus and I said my opinion about something. I wanted to make something the best for the band and I think they misunderstood me, like I wanted to be leader. I was telling the truth and that's how I am... It was a great time in Helloween... but I was happy when I left the band after the Dark Ride because it's one of my favourite albums, it totally changed my life.

Grapow and Kusch decided to go on with the side project they had been planning and formed the band Masterplan with former Ark and the Snakes singer Jørn Lande. After Kusch left the band in 2006, Grapow became the leader and main songwriter of Masterplan.

=== Production work ===
Grapow resides in Zvolenská Slatina, Slovakia, where he runs his own musical studio—Grapow Studios. Among many other projects, Grapow produced Czech metalcore band X-Core's 2008 album In Hell as well as their 2011 follow-up, Life and Stuff.

In 2011, he mixed the album Motherland for the Italian progressive metal band Daedalus and played the guitar solo on the song "Underground".

In 2012, Czech power metal band Eagleheart recorded their second album, Dreamtherapy, for Scarlet Records, with Grapow producing, mixing, mastering, and contributing guest vocals and guitar solos.

He also produced Slovak symphonic metal band Anthology's album The Prophecy.

He has worked extensively with Spanish power metal band Lords of Black, producing their albums Lords of Black and II.

=== Kreyson ===
In 2017, Grapow joined Czech metal band Kreyson as their lead guitarist. In 2019, he announced his departure from the band.

== Partial discography ==
Year of Release	Artist	Title	Label
1980	Rampage	Victim of Rock	Independent
1982	Rampage	Love Lights Up The Night	Independent
1991	Helloween	Pink Bubbles Go Ape	EMI
1993	Helloween	Chameleon	EMI
1994	Helloween	Master of the Rings	Castle Communications
1996	Helloween	The Time of the Oath	Castle Communications
1996	Helloween	High Live	Castle Communications
1997	Roland Grapow	The Four Seasons of Life	Snapper Music
1998	Helloween	Better Than Raw	Castle Communications
1999	Roland Grapow	Kaleidoscope	SPV/Steamhammer
1999	Helloween	Metal Jukebox	Castle Communications
2000	Helloween	The Dark Ride	Nuclear Blast
2003	Masterplan	Masterplan	AFM Records
2005	Masterplan	Aeronautics	AFM Records
2007	Masterplan	MK II	AFM Records
2009	Tony Hernando	Actual Events	Lion Music
2009	Saratoga	Secretos y Revelaciones	Avispa Records
2010	Masterplan	Time to Be King	AFM Records
2010	Sebastien	Tears of White Roses	Escape Music
2012	Saratoga	Némesis	Avispa Records
2013	Masterplan	Novum Initium	AFM Records
2014	Lords of Black	Lords of Black	Lords of Black Records
2015	Serious Black	As Daylight Breaks	AFM Records
2015	Level 10	Chapter One	Frontiers Records
2015	Paco Ventura Black Moon	Fragile Crystal	Avispa Records
2015	Sebastien	Dark Chambers of Déjà Vu	Pride & Joy Music
2016	Lords of Black	II	Frontiers Records
2017	Masterplan	PumpKings	AFM Records
2026	Masterplan	Metalmorphosis	Frontiers Records

Preceded by Kai Hansen	Helloween guitarist 1989–2001	Succeeded by Sascha Gerstner
