= Extrema (band) =

Italian thrash/groove metal band

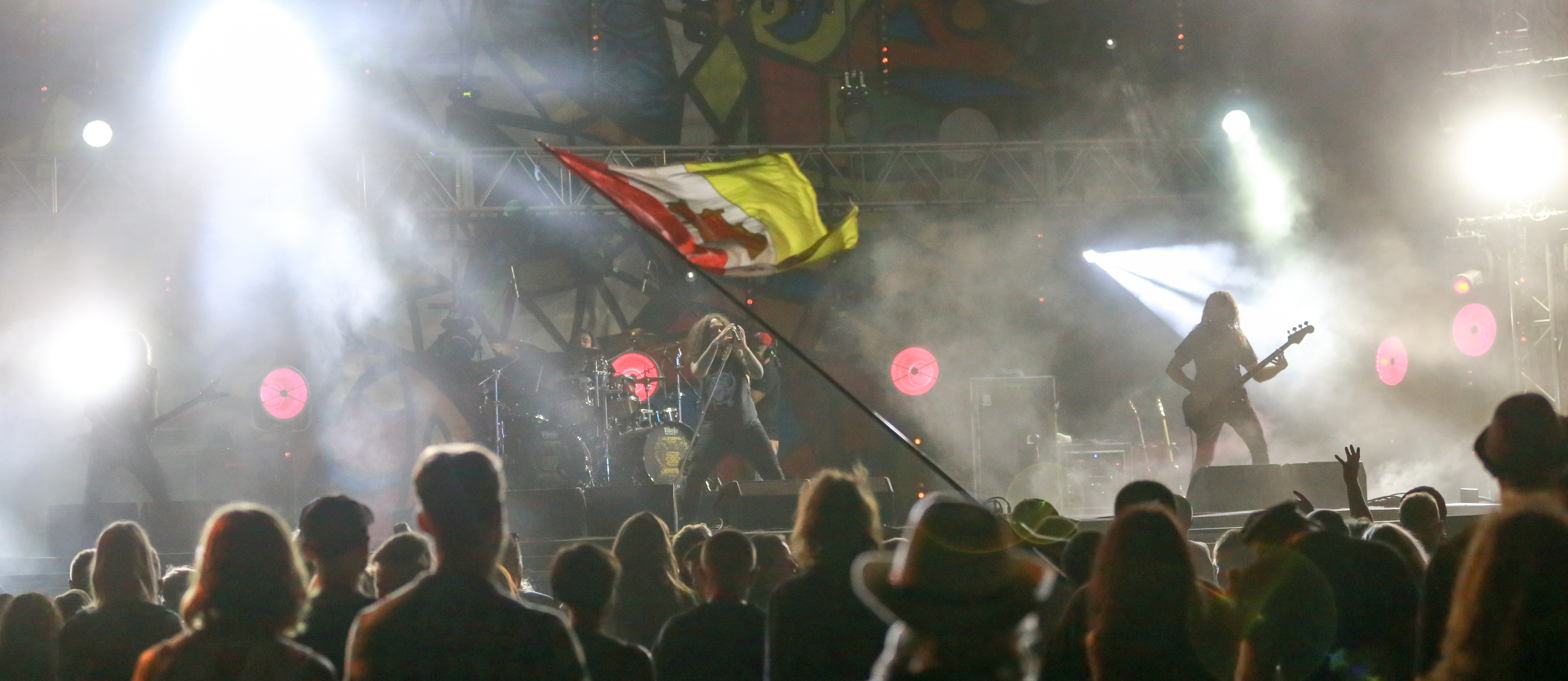
- Pol'and'Rock Festival 2018

Background information
- Origin: Milan, Italy
- Genres: Groove metal, thrash metal
- Years active: 1986–present
- Labels: Flying Records, Scarlet, Contempo
- Members: Tommy Massara; Paolo Crimi; Mattia Bigi; Tiziano "Titian" Spigno
- Past members: Gianluca Perotti; Stefano Bullegas; Chris Dalla Pellegrina; Luca Varisco; Daniele Vecchi; Andrea Boria; Walter Andreatta; Julias Loglio
- Website: extremateam.com

Extrema is an Italian groove/thrash metal band from Milan. Their lyrics are written in English.

== History ==
Extrema formed in 1986 in Milan. The initial lineup included guitarist Tommy Massara, vocalist/guitarist Andrea Boria, bassist Luca Varisco, and drummer Stefano Bullegas. Regarded as one of Italy's first thrash metal bands, Extrema's first EP, We Fuckin' Care (1987), sold 3,000 copies largely by word of mouth. Italian heavy metal fans did not yet seem prepared to embrace local talent, however, and the next four years saw Extrema (by then entirely revamped, with Massara signing on new members Gianluca Perotti on vocals, Mattia Bigi on bass, and Chris Dalla Pellegrina on drums) relegated to open for visiting acts like Slayer, D.R.I., and Corrosion of Conformity.

Finally realizing that their only hope of impressing local talent scouts lay in marketing themselves abroad, Extrema started aggressively shopping their demos to international heavy metal critics, and even financed a trip to New York City for a one-off gig. The strategy worked, and their four-track demo from 1991 was soon attracting the attention of some major international publications, eventually leading to a record deal with Contempo Records. The result was the 1993's Tension at the Seams album, which led to stadium support slots with Italian rock star Vasco Rossi, and more importantly a high-profile metal festival appearance in Turin alongside Megadeth, The Cult, Suicidal Tendencies, and Metallica. The album also featured an unconventional cover of The Police's Truth Hits Everybody and spawned a video clip for the track Child O' Boogaow which was on heavy rotation on Italy's MTV affiliate, Videomusic.

Capping off their most successful year, Extrema issued a six-track live EP entitled Proud, Powerful 'n' Alive, and then got right back on the road, playing upwards of 50 shows across Italy before signing with new label Flying Records and getting to work on their next album. Released in 1995, The Positive Pressure (Of Injustice) boasted improved production values while updating their thrash metal style to keep pace with the era's groove metal acts such as Pantera and Machine Head.

Despite a waning interest in Extrema in the late 1990s, Massara kept the band going, and Extrema released a string of albums in the following years, with 2001's Better Mad Than Dead and V2's Set the World on Fire (2005). In 2009, Extrema switched to Scarlet Records, where they recorded Pound for Pound and The Seed of Foolishness (2013).

== Musical style ==
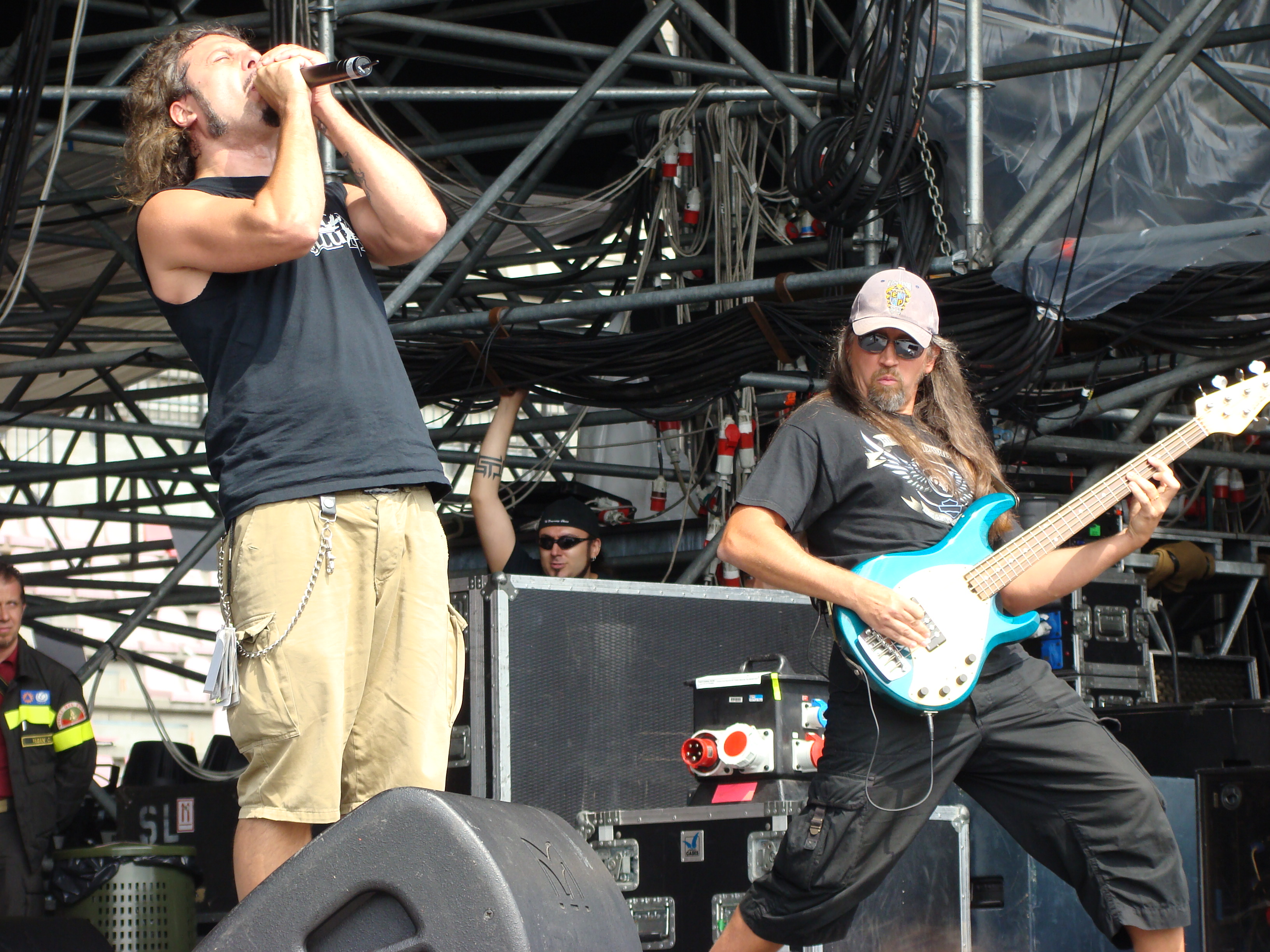
Extrema at Gods of Metal 2009

The band played classic thrash metal on their debut album Tension at the Seams, which was already "a relic of another era" when it was released. The songs are reminiscent of the works of Anthrax and Death Angel, while the bass playing is reminiscent of Mordred and Mind Funk. The tracks on the second album, The Positive Pressure (Of Injustice), were compared to the works of Pantera, and were described as not very imaginative but "technically very sound". The third album Better Mad than Dead has a similar sound, with strong influences from nu metal being audible, with groups such as Slipknot and Korn in particular being mentioned in this context. It also uses electronic effects that sound like White Zombie around 1995. Furthermore, influences from Biohazard and Sepultura (especially the album Chaos A.D.) were noted.

== Band members ==
=== Current members ===
- Tommy Massara – guitars (1986–present)
- Gabri Giovanna – bass (2010–present)
- Francesco "Frullo" La Rosa – drums (2014–present)
- Tiziano "Titian" Spigno – vocals (2017–present)

=== Former members ===
- Andrea Boria – vocals, guitars (1986–1989)
- Gianluca Perotti – vocals (1989–2006, 2007–2013, 2014–2017)
- Luca Varisco – bass, backing vocals (1986–1989)
- Stefano Bullegas – drums (1986–1989)
- Daniele Vecchi – vocals (1989)
- Walter Andreatta – guitars (1989)
- Chris Dalla Pellegrina – drums (1989–2004)
- Mattia Bigi – bass (1989–2010)
- Julias Loglio – guitars (1992–1993)
- Paolo Crimi – drums (2004–2014)

== Discography ==
=== Studio albums ===
- Tension at the Seams – 1993
- The Positive Pressure (Of Injustice) – 1995
- Better Mad Than Dead – 2001
- Set the World on Fire – 2005
- Pound for Pound – 2009
- The Seed of Foolishness – 2013
- Headbanging Forever – 2019

=== EPs ===
- We Fuckin' Care – 1987
- Proud, Powerful 'n' Alive – 1993

=== Live albums ===
- "Raisin' Hell with Friends – Live at the Rolling Stone" – 2007

=== Best-of albums ===
- And the Best Has Yet to Come – 2003
