= Sadist (band) =

Italian death metal band

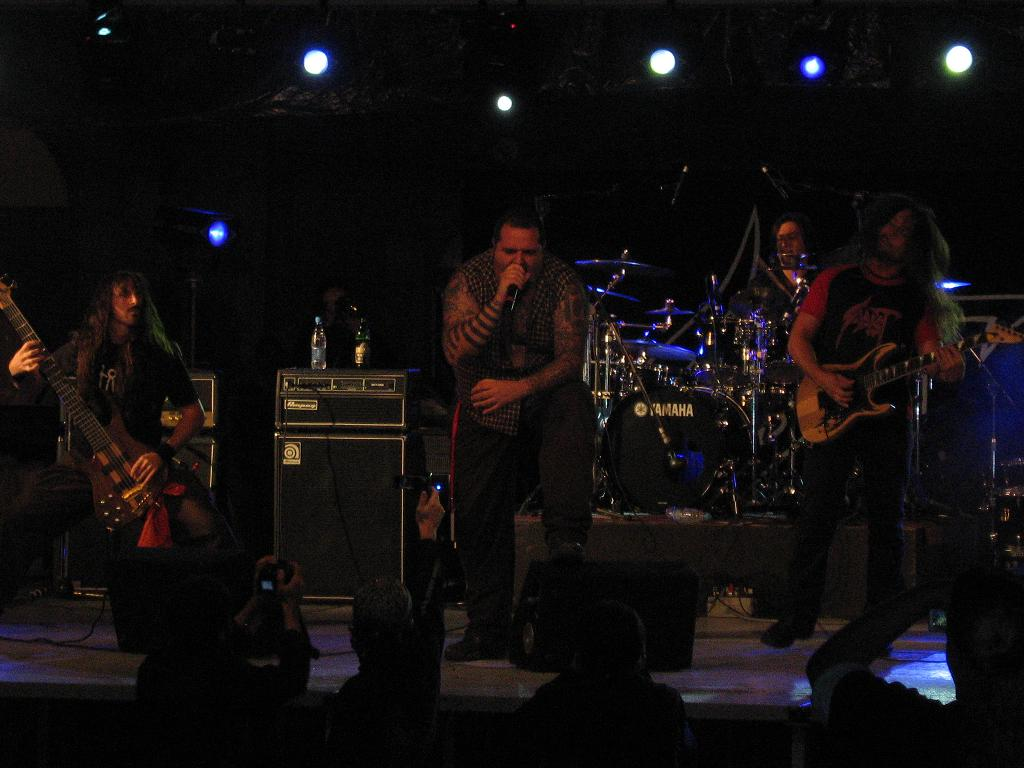
- Sadist performing in 2008. From left to right: Andy, Trevor, Alessio, Tommy

Background information
- Origin: Genoa, Italy
- Genres: Technical death metal; progressive metal
- Years active: 1991–2000, 2005–present
- Labels: Beyond Productions, Scarlet
- Members: Trevor Nadir; Tommy Talamanca
- Past members: Andy Marchini; Alessio Spallarossa; Chicco Parisi; Marco "Peso" Pesenti; Zanna; Fabio Bocchiddi; Oinos

Sadist is an Italian death metal band formed in Genoa, in January 1991. It debuted with Black Screams in 1991, then released three albums. The band went on hiatus after releasing the album Lego in 2000. They reunited in 2005 and released their self-titled album in 2007. Sadist has released three more albums since. The band has released nine albums and one EP. They are signed to Scarlet Records. Guitarist and keyboardist Tommy Talamanca has been a constant member, main composer, and co-producer throughout the band's existence. Trevor Nadir has been the main singer since 1996.

== History ==
=== 1991–2000 ===
Sadist was formed in early 1991 by Tommy Talamanca (guitar, keyboards) and Marco 'Peso' Pesenti (drums), who had left the band Necrodeath to start a new project. Inspired by progressive rock and thrash metal, Talamanca developed the concept for the group, while Andy Marchini (bass) and Fabio Bocchiddi (vocals) joined. While playing locally, the band recorded a demo and signed to indie label Obscure Plasma Records. They released the Black Screams EP in September 1991, which took the material from the demo tape. The EP was later released in 1992 by American indie label Wild Rag Records as a three-track version. The band toured Italy and France, until Bocchiddi left the band a year later and Marchini took over vocals.

The band signed a two-album deal with Nosferatu Records and released Above the Light in 1993. Marchini left the band and was replaced with bassist Chicco Parisi and new singer Zanna. In late 1993, the band recorded the music video for the song "Sometimes They Come Back" from the Above the Light album and began a tour of France and the Netherlands.

In early 1994, Sadist supported Carcass during the Italian shows of their "Heartwork" tour. A few months later, they supported Samael in France. While on tour, the band worked on their new album and, in May 1995, entered Rhythm Studios in Bidford on Avon, England, where they started recording their second album.

In 1996, Tribe was released in February, distributed by Sun Rising Records for Europe and Toy's Factory for Japan. The band toured to promote the new album in France, Italy, and the Netherlands until June, and their second video, "Tribe," was broadcast all over Europe. In November, Sadist headlined Mindviews Belgian Metal Convention and was featured on the Japanese Iron Maiden tribute with their version of "Wrathchild." At the end of 1996, drummer Pesenti left to reform Necrodeath. He was replaced with Filippo 'Oinos' Ferrari. Singer Zanna was replaced with Trevor Nadir, while bass player Andy Marchini returned.

In early 1997, the band started recording their third album. Before the album was released, Oinos left and was replaced with Alessio Spallarossa. At the end of 1997, Sadist signed with Displeased Records and released Crust. The album was also distributed in Japan. In 1998, the band released their third music video, "'Fools' and Dolts." Shortly after, the band travelled to Germany to play at a European festival Wacken Open Air.

In 1999, the band signed with Impact/System Shock and self-produced the album Lego at Nadir Recording Studios. The response to the album was not favourable, due to having a nu metal sound. The band went on hiatus. They reformed in 2005 and signed with Italian indie label Beyond Productions. A video for the song "One Thousand Memories" appeared in February 2008. They re-released Above the Light and Tribe, remastered at Talamanca's Nadir Studios.

=== 2005–present ===
In late 2006, the band began recording a new album. The self-titled album Sadist was released in April 2007 and featured a guest appearance by Claudio Simonetti from Goblin on the title track. The band toured the rest of the year, headlining two Armenian festivals, Highland Metalfest and Rock the Borders. In 2010, the band released the album Season in Silence, the first on the Italian Scarlet label.

In 2015, the band released the album Hyaena inspired by African rhythms and featuring Senegalese percussionist Jean N'Diaye.

In November 2018, the album Spellbound was released, inspired by Alfred Hitchcock, where the songs referred to characters or earlier movies such as The Mountain Eagle. In 2019, original bass player Andy Marchini left the band and Andrea Nasso filled in on tour. At the start of 2021, the band announced that the recording on a ninth album Firescorched had begun, with fretless bassist Jeroen Paul Thesseling and drummer Romain Goulon. The album was released on May 20, 2022.

On 9 January 2025, the band announced their tenth studio album, Something to Pierce, set for release on 7 March.

In the summer of 2025, the group announced plans to perform in Russia in November, sparking backlash. The band responded officially that they were "apolitical".

== Band line-up ==
=== Current members ===
- Tommy Talamanca − guitar, keyboards (1991–2001, 2005–present)
- Trevor Nadir − vocals (1996–2000, 2005–present)

=== Current session and touring members ===
- Davide Piccolo – bass (2022–present)
- Giorgio "Jenny" Piva – drums (2022–present)

=== Former members ===
- Andy Marchini − bass, vocals (1991–1994), fretless bass (1996–2001, 2005–2019)
- Marco 'Peso' Pesenti − drums (1991–1996)
- Sibylle Colin-Tocquaine − vocals (1991)
- Fabio − vocals (1991–1992, 2000–2001)
- Zanna − vocals (1995–1996)
- Chicco Parisi − bass, fretless bass (1995–1996)
- Oinos − drums (1997–1999)
- Alessio Spallarossa − drums (1999–2001, 2005–2020)
- Andrea Nasso − bass (2019–2020)
- Romain Goulon − drums (2020–2024)

=== Studio musicians ===
- Jeroen Paul Thesseling – fretless bass (2020–2021)

== Discography ==
=== Studio albums ===
==== Above the Light (1993) ====
1. Nadir
2. Breathin' Cancer
3. Enslaver of Lies
4. Sometimes They Come Back
5. Hell in Myself
6. Desert Divinities
7. Sadist
8. Happyness 'n' Sorrow

==== Tribe (1996) ====
1. Escogido
2. India
3. From Bellatrix to Betelgeuse
4. Den Siste Kampe
5. Tribe
6. Spiral of Winter Ghosts
7. The Ninth Wave
8. The Reign of Asmat

==== Crust (1997) ====
1. Perversion Lust Orgasm
2. The Path
3. Fools and Dolts
4. Holy...
5. Ovariotomy
6. Instinct
7. Obsession-Compulsion
8. ...Crust
9. I Rape You
10. Christmas Beat
11. Take On Me
12. Relax

==== Lego (2000) ====
1. A Tender Fable
2. It's Not Good
3. Meat
4. Flies on Me
5. Fog
6. Plastic Star
7. Flowing Out Red
8. I Want It
9. Welcome to My Zoo
10. Small Great Child
11. Dodgy Fuckin' Cow
12. The Line
13. Dogs Sledge Man
14. Cappuccetto grosso

==== Sadist (2007) ====
1. Jagriti
2. One Thousand Memories
3. I Feel You Climb
4. Embracing the Form of Life
5. Tearing Away
6. Kopto
7. Excited and Desirous
8. Different Melodies
9. Invisible
10. Hope to Be Deaf
11. Sadist

==== Season in Silence (2010) ====
1. Aput
2. Broken and Reborn
3. Season in Silence
4. The Attic and the World of Emotions
5. Evil Birds
6. Ogron
7. Night Owl
8. Snowman
9. Bloody Cold Winter
10. The Abyss
11. Frozen Hands
12. Hiberna

==== Hyaena (2015) ====
1. The Lonely Mountain
2. Pachycrocuta
3. Bouki
4. The Devil Riding the Evil Steed
5. Scavenger and Thief
6. Gadawan Kura
7. Eternal Enemies
8. African Devourers
9. Scratching Rocks
10. Genital Mask

==== Spellbound (2018) ====
1. 39 Steps
2. The Birds
3. Spellbound
4. Rear Window
5. Bloody Bates
6. Notorius
7. Stage Fright
8. I'm the Man Who Knew Too Much
9. Frenzy
10. The Mountain Eagle
11. Downhill

==== Firescorched (2022) ====
1. Accabadora
2. Fleshbound
3. Finger Food
4. Burial of a Clown
5. Loa
6. Aggression/Regression
7. Three Mothers and the Old Devil Father
8. Trauma (Impaired Mind Functionality)
9. Firescorched

==== Something to Pierce (2025) ====
1. Something to Pierce
2. Deprived
3. No Feast for Flies
4. Kill Devour Dissect
5. The Sun God
6. Dume Kike
7. One Shot Closer
8. The Best Part Is the Brain
9. Nove Strade
10. Respirium

=== EP ===
- Black Screams (1991)

== Videography ==
- "Sometimes They Come Back" – Above the Light (1993)
- "Tribe" – Tribe (1996)
- "'Fools' and Dolts" – Crust (1998)
- "Tearing Away" – Sadist (2007)
- "One Thousand Memories" – Sadist (2007)
- "The Lonely Mountain" – Hyaena (2015)
- "Den Siste Kamp" Ft. GnuQuartet (2017)
- "Accabadora" – Firescorched (2022)
