= Uli Kusch =

German drummer

- Born: Ulrich Kusch; 11 March 1967 (age 59); Aachen, West Germany
- Genres: Heavy metal, power metal, thrash metal, speed metal
- Occupations: Drummer
- Years active: 1983–present

Ulrich Kusch (born 11 March 1967) is a German heavy metal drummer. He is best known for playing with Helloween, Gamma Ray, Masterplan and Holy Moses, among others. He is known for his technical style of playing, fast-paced speed metal-like rhythm, and capable songwriting abilities.

== Biography ==
During the 1980s and early 1990s, he used to be a studio musician and played for many bands, such as Holy Moses, Mekong Delta among others. In 1990, after first drummer of Gamma Ray Mathias Burchardt quit the band, Kai Hansen recruited Uli to perform for his band. In 1991, this lineup released their second full-length studio album, labeled Sigh No More and went on a world tour.

However, Uli quit Gamma Ray in 1992. He Joined Axe La Chapelle 1993 and played the drums for the album "Grab What You Can" before he joined Helloween, with whom he released Master of the Rings in 1994 and The Time of the Oath in 1996. That same year Helloween released the 2-CD live album High Live, providing a decent demonstration of Uli's skills for performing live. That time Uli himself formed and produced with Gamma Ray guitarist Henjo Richter the Rainbow tribute band Catch the Rainbow and soon other musicians joined them. Their album A Tribute to Rainbow, with eleven covers of Rainbow songs, was released in 1999. It featured other members of Helloween and Gamma Ray as well as other bands. He also played in Markus Grosskopf's side-project Shockmachine for their only album in 1998. Helloween recorded Better Than Raw the same year, followed by the band's album of covers Metal Jukebox in 1999.

Uli stayed with Helloween up to 2000's The Dark Ride, developing into a key songwriter for the band. Kusch also played on Sinner's 2000 album The End of Sanctuary. In 2001, Uli and fellow bandmember Roland Grapow were fired from Helloween, following an e-mail from Michael Weikath. The two went on to form Masterplan, something they had originally been planning as a side project.

With Masterplan Kusch recorded two studio albums, one self-titled in 2003 and Aeronautics in 2005. That same year, Uli formed a new band called Beautiful Sin with help from Masterplan bandmate Axel Mackenrott and members of Pagan's Mind. Uli departed from Masterplan in October 2006 for personal and musical differences. He said at the time that Beautiful Sin became his new main priority.

Uli also co-founded a new progressive power metal project called Ride the Sky, which released its debut album New Protection under Nuclear Blast Records on 24 August 2007, but the band broke up in April 2008 due to poor media attention and minor support from the record company. He has also rejoined the progressive thrash metal outfit Mekong Delta and recorded the album Lurking Fear with the band.

In late 2010, Uli joined Symfonia, a power metal supergroup formed together by André Matos, Timo Tolkki, Jari Kainulainen and Mikko Härkin. They made their debut performance at Finnish Metal Expo 2011. The band entered the studio in November 2010 to begin recording their debut album, In Paradisum and was released on 25 March 2011.

During the preparations for the upcoming tour, Uli suffered from nerve damage in his left hand which led the band to hire Alex Landenburg as his replacement for the debut performance at Finnish Metal Expo, as well as some other dates. Latest news is that Uli has officially left the band to continue recovering from his nerve damage which made it impossible for him to play drums for a year. Since 2013 Uli is teaching drums at the "Kulturskole Trysil /Norway" and playing as a freelancer. In June 2025, Kusch announced the formation of a new melodic heavy metal band called Angels of Attack alongside vocalist Oliver Fehr (formerly of the Swiss band Transit), guitarist Henning Ramseth (Ram-Zet), and bassist Sonja Fehr. The band debuted with the single "Don't Let Go" and followed it up with their second single, "Echoes from the Storm".

== Discography ==
=== Holy Moses ===
- Finished with the Dogs (1987)
- The New Machine of Liechtenstein (1989)
- World Chaos (1990)

=== Gamma Ray ===
- Heading for the East (Live video) (1990)
- Heaven Can Wait (EP) (1990)
- Sigh No More (1991)

=== Axe La Chapelle ===
- Grab What You Can (1994)

=== Helloween ===
- Master of the Rings (1994)
- The Time Of The Oath (1996)
- High Live (Live video) (1996)
- Better Than Raw (1998)
- Metal Jukebox (1999)
- The Dark Ride (2000)

=== Roland Grapow ===
- The Four Seasons of Life (1997)

=== Sinner ===
- The End of Sanctuary (2000)

=== Masterplan ===
- Enlighten Me EP (2002)
- Masterplan (2003)
- Back For My Life EP (2004)
- Aeronautics (2005)

=== Beautiful Sin ===
- The Unexpected (2006)

=== Mekong Delta ===
- Lurking Fear (2007)

=== Ride the Sky ===
- New Protection (2007)

=== Symfonia ===
- In Paradisum (2011)

=== Carnal Agony ===
- Preludes & Nocturnes (2014)

=== Majestica ===
- Above the Sky (2019)

=== Last Union ===
- "Most Beautiful Day" (2016)

=== With Angels of Attack ===
- "Don't Let Go" (Single, 2025)
- "Echoes from the Storm" (Single, 2025)
