= Masterplan (band) =

German power metal band

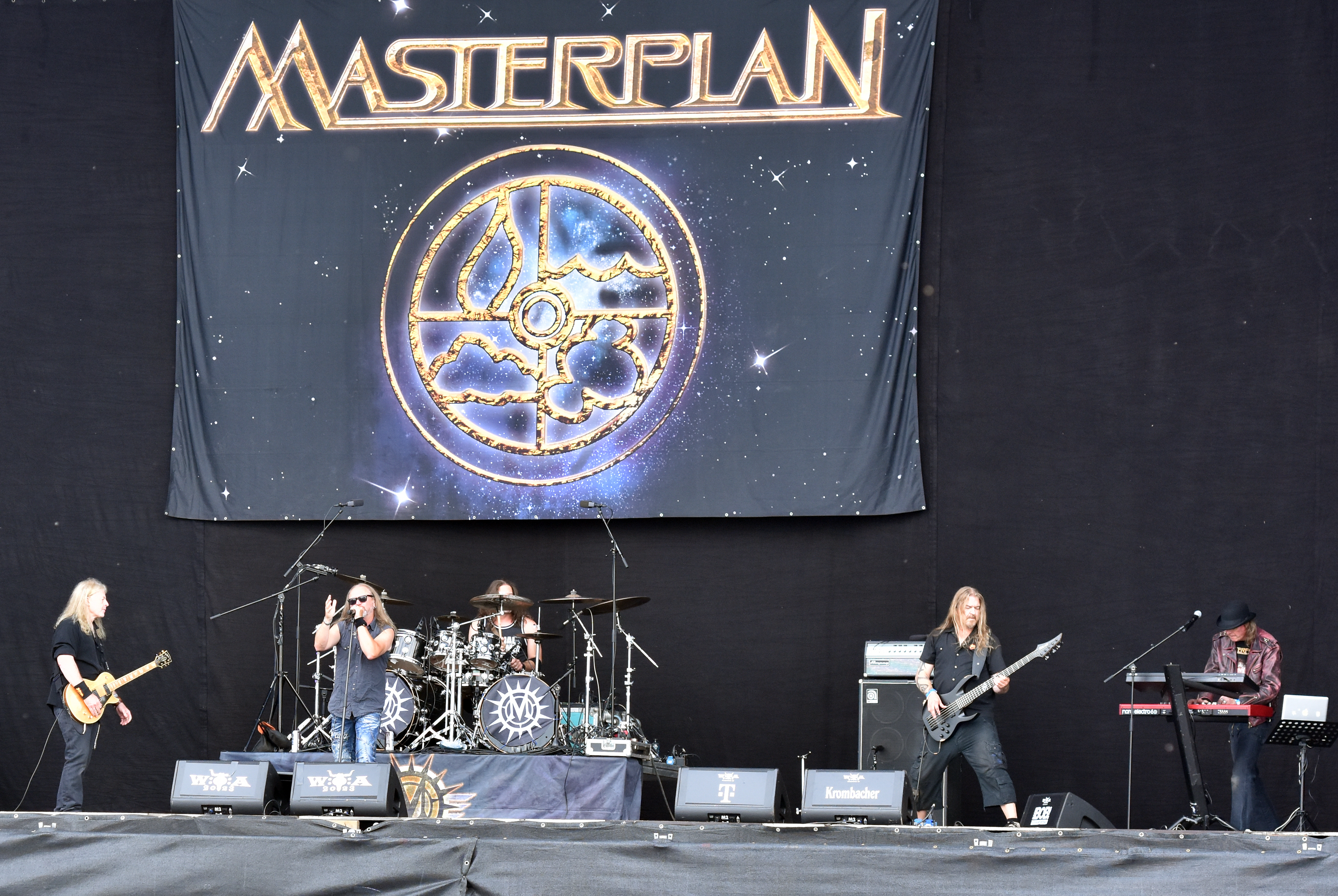
- Masterplan at Wacken Open Air 2023

Background information
- Origin: Hamburg, Germany
- Genres: Power metal
- Years active: 2001–present
- Members: Rick Altzi; Roland Grapow; Jari Kainulainen; Axel Mackenrott; Kevin Kott
- Past members: Jørn Lande; Jan S. Eckert; Uli Kusch; Mike Terrana; Mike DiMeo; Martin Marthus Skaroupka; Janne Wirman; Jürgen Attig
- Website: master-plan.net
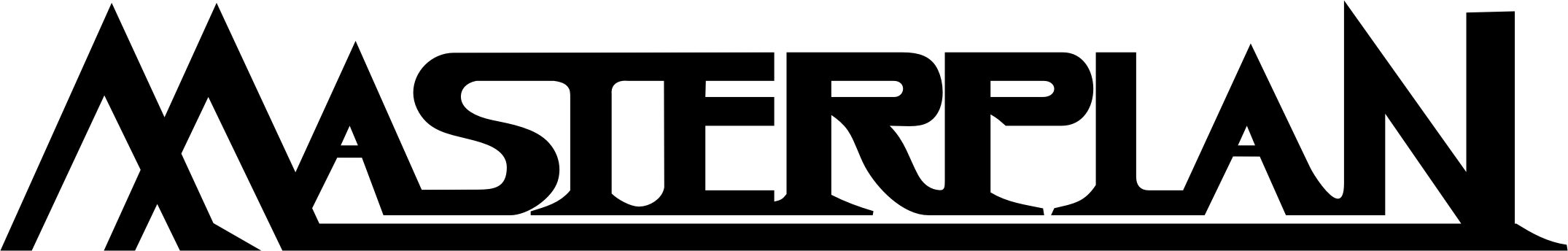

Masterplan is a German power metal band founded by guitarist Roland Grapow and drummer Uli Kusch upon leaving Helloween in 2001.

== History ==
During Helloween's tour of their album The Dark Ride in 2001, members Roland Grapow and Uli Kusch (who had been in the band since 1989 and 1994, respectively) decided to form a side project. As the other Helloween members felt the two were more focused on their side project than Helloween at the time, both were later fired from the band. The name "Masterplan" was born out of the idea that they would be master musicians with the future in their hands, starting the newest power metal band of the new millennium. To fill out their line-up, Roland subsequently invited Children of Bodom keyboardist Janne Wirman. For vocals, Russell Allen was invited but he had to decline, being busy with his main band Symphony X. A second invitation was made for former Helloween singer Michael Kiske, who also rejected the proposal, claiming that he wanted to keep away from the metal scene. After being impressed with the vocals on the Norwegian band Ark's album Burn The Sun and a solo album titled Worldchanger, singer Jørn Lande was invited. Jørn accepted the invitation, completing the band roughly six months after the beginning of the project.

Their first full-length self-titled album Masterplan was released in 2003, produced by Andy Sneap. The band then consisted of Grapow and Kusch with Jørn Lande. The main part of the keyboard lines on the album were arranged and programmed by Roland and Uli. Keyboardist Janne "Warman" Wirman recorded some sessions for the album, but could not stay on as a full-time member due to his commitments to Children of Bodom. Axel Mackenrott replaced him on tour and soon after as a permanent member. Studio bassist Jürgen Attig (Casanova) helped with some bass lines on the recordings, but Grapow was the main bassist for the album. For tour and subsequent recordings, Jan-Sören Eckert was hired as a permanent member.

The band received the "European Border Breakers Award" from the European Commission in 2004, for the debut album success around Europe.

In January 2005, Masterplan released their second album, Aeronautics once again produced by Andy Sneap and the band. After two successful albums and their respective tours, during the writing of the third album the band parted ways with vocalist Jørn Lande, citing "musical differences" as the reason for the split. The split was amicable enough that Jørn agreed to perform four previously arranged live appearances before departing although two of these were eventually cancelled by the promoters.

On 4 October 2006, Uli Kusch announced his departure from the band in an interview with Darkside.ru. Although not discussing the details of what had happened, he mentioned the democratic principles of making decisions in the band as one of the reasons of his leaving – according to him, it often made getting a consensus nearly impossible. Three days later, Masterplan announced their new line-up through their official web site: Grapow, Mackenrott, Eckert, with new members Mike DiMeo (Riot, The Lizards) and Mike Terrana (ex-Artension, ex-Rage, Metalium, ex-Axel Rudi Pell). The band toured with Saxon as an opening act for Saxon's Inner Sanctum tour.

The band's third album, suitably titled MK II, was released on 26 February 2007. It was produced this time by the band's actual leader, Roland Grapow himself, at his own studio in Slovakia. It was recorded in September and October 2006.

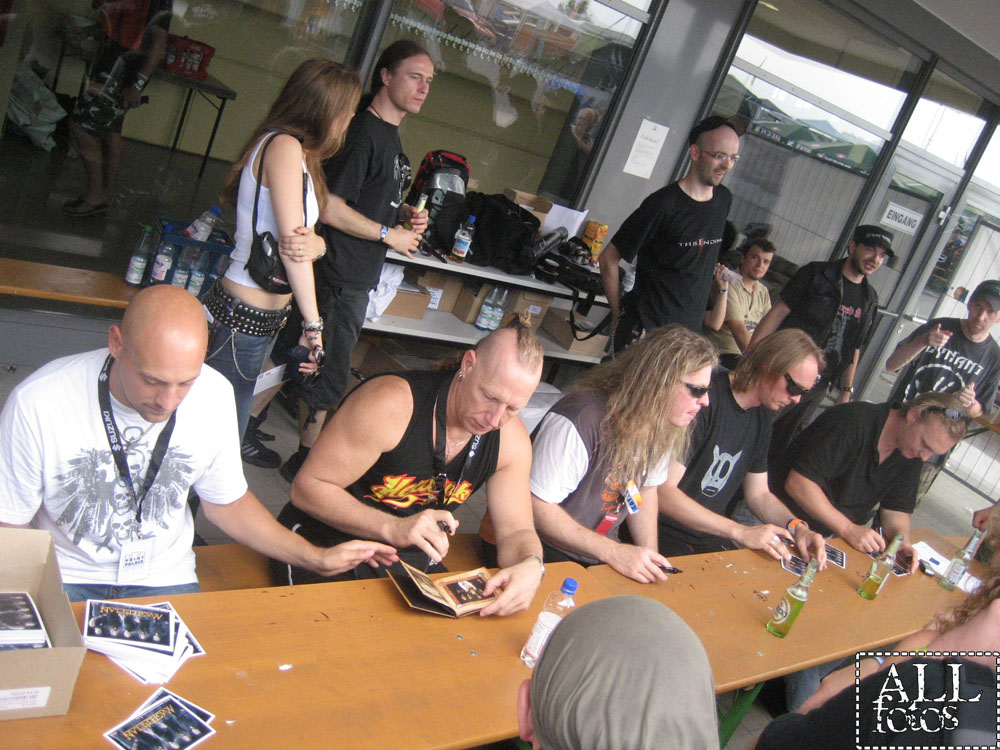
Masterplan members in 2007

On 11 January 2009, Mike DiMeo confirmed on his MySpace page that he had parted ways with Masterplan. On 25 July 2009, the band finally revealed that Jørn Lande has made his return to Masterplan.

On 16 April 2010, a single titled Far From the End of the World was released to precede the band's new fourth album, Time To Be King, once again produced by Roland Grapow.

On 13 July 2011, the band announced on their official website that they were writing songs for a new album. The album was set to be released in March 2013.

In July 2012, it was announced that Martin Marthus Skaroupka (Cradle of Filth drummer) will play on the new Masterplan album. In early November, it was announced that Rick Altzi and Jari Kainulainen would replace Jorn Lande and Jan Eckert on the upcoming album. In November 2012, during an interview with Metal Shock Finland's Chief Editor, Mohsen Fayyazi, when talking about Jorn's departure from the band, Roland stated the following: "Everybody always expects something special from Jorn, but it's a very unstable situation. To keep happy it's not easy and to be honest I've not heard from him for 2 years. Don't get me wrong, we're still friends but we just don't have much contact."

On 21 February 2013, the new album was announced. The title of the album is Novum Initium and it was released on 14 June 2013 through German record label AFM Records.

In an interview made in Italy, on 16 September 2016, Roland Grapow confirmed the addition of At Vance member Kevin Kott as the drummer of the band replacing Martin Marthus Škaroupka whose commitments with his other band Cradle of Filth prevented him for playing shows with Masterplan.

They also announced the release of a new album consisting of re-recordings of Helloween songs written by Roland Grapow from the time he was in the band. The album, PumpKings, was released on 28 July 2017. Grapow stated that the album was not any kind of revenge for being fired from Helloween, or not being invited to their Pumpkins United World Tour in 2017: "[fans] all thought it was kind of a revenge or something... now I remember. To me, it's just a relaxing situation [...] I never had this in my mind. It's just a bit coincidental because I delayed this album for two years and it came out at the same time when the reunion tour came." The band was on hiatus for the following years. The band announced a new song and a tour to follow to start 2024.

In 2025, Masterplan announced that they are "gearing up for the release of" their upcoming album Metalmorphosis, which was scheduled to be released on 22 May 2026, but delayed to 26 June.

== Members ==
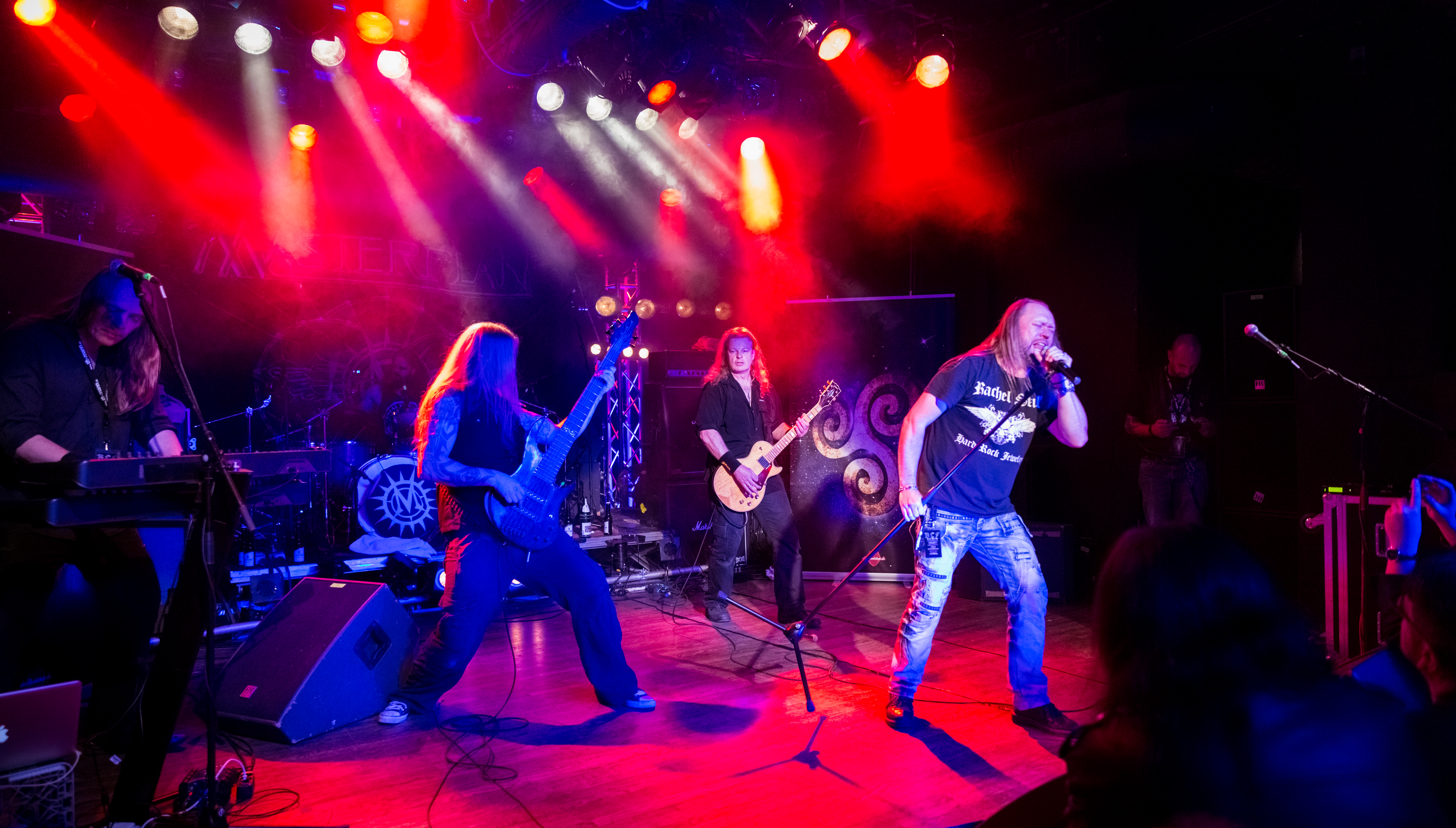
Masterplan at Börsencrash Festival Wuppertal, Germany, 2016

=== Current ===
- Roland Grapow – guitars (2001–present), lead vocals, bass, keyboards (2001–2002)
- Axel Mackenrott – keyboards (2003–present)
- Rick Altzi – lead vocals (2012–present)
- Jari Kainulainen – bass (2012–present)
- Kevin Kott – drums (2016–present)

=== Former ===
- Uli Kusch – drums (2001–2006), keyboards (2001–2002)
- Jørn Lande – lead vocals (2002–2006, 2009–2012)
- Jan S. Eckert – bass (2003–2012)
- Mike Terrana – drums (2006–2012)
- Mike DiMeo – lead vocals (2006–2009)
- Martin "Marthus" Škaroupka – drums (2012–2016)

=== Guest and session musicians ===
- Janne Wirman – session keyboards (2002)
- Jürgen Attig – session bass (2002)
- Michael Kiske – vocals on "Heroes" on Masterplan (2003)
- Ferdy Doernberg – keyboards on "Into the Light" on Masterplan (2003)
- Russell Allen – vocals on demos (2001)

== Discography ==
=== Studio albums ===
- Masterplan (2003)
- Aeronautics (2005)
- MK II (2007)
- Time to Be King (2010)
- Novum Initium (2013)
- PumpKings (cover album) (2017)
- Metalmorphosis (2026)

=== Singles/EPs ===
- Enlighten Me (2002)
- Back for My Life (2004)
- Lost and Gone (2007)
- Far from the End of the World (2010)
- Rise Again (2024)

=== Live albums/DVDs ===
- Keep Your Dream Alive (2015)

=== Other appearances ===
- "Headbanger's Ballroom" – track on Ballroom Hamburg: A Decade of Rock compilation (2010)

=== Music videos ===
- "Enlighten Me" (2002)
- "Back for My Life" (2004)
- "Lost and Gone" (2007)
- "Time to Be King" (2010)
- "Keep Your Dream Alive" (2013)
- "Spirit Never Die" (2015)
