= The Best, the Rest, the Rare =

Compilation album by Helloween
- Released: 21 August 1991
- Genre: Power metal
- Length: 77:10
- Label: Noise Futurist
- Producer: Bernd Steinwedel

Helloween chronology
Pink Bubbles Go Ape (1991)	The Best, the Rest, the Rare (1991)	Chameleon (1993)

The Best, the Rest, the Rare is the first compilation album by German power metal band Helloween. It was released in 1991 on the label Noise Records.

== Reception ==
Professional ratings
Review scores
Source	Rating
AllMusic	4/5 stars

== Track listing ==
All tracks are written by Kai Hansen, except where noted.

No.	Title	Writer(s)	Length
1.	"I Want Out"		4:38
2.	"Dr. Stein"	Michael Weikath	5:01
3.	"Future World"		4:02
4.	"Judas"		4:39
5.	"Walls of Jericho"	Weikath	0:48
6.	"Ride the Sky"		5:55
7.	"Halloween"		13:16
8.	"Livin' Ain't No Crime"	Weikath	4:40
9.	"Save Us"		5:11
10.	"Victim of Fate"		6:58
11.	"Savage"	Michael Kiske	3:22
12.	"Don't Run for Cover"	Kiske	4:43
13.	"Keeper of the Seven Keys"	Weikath	13:37

== Personnel ==
- Michael Kiske – vocals
- Kai Hansen – guitars
- Michael Weikath – guitars
- Markus Grosskopf – bass guitar
- Ingo Schwichtenberg – drums
- Alasdair Lincoln – tambourine

== Charts ==
Chart (1991)	Peak position
German Albums (Offizielle Top 100)	50
Japanese Albums (Oricon)	15
Swiss Albums (Schweizer Hitparade)	28
