= Treasure Chest (Helloween album) =

Box set by Helloween
- Released: April 9, 2002
- Recorded: 1985–1999
- Genre: Power metal
- Length: 3:29:29
- Label: Metal-Is Records

Helloween chronology
The Dark Ride (2000)	Treasure Chest (2002)	Rabbit Don't Come Easy (2003)

Professional ratings
Review scores
Source	Rating
Allmusic	4.5/5 stars

Treasure Chest is a box set by German power metal band Helloween.

Originally seen as quite the collection for fans/collectors worldwide the box consists of 2 discs compiling (and remastering) some of the finest works of their 1985-2000 albums as well as a third (bonus disc) featuring many rare B-sides from the band's past singles. However, since the 2006 remastering and expansion of most of Helloween's back catalogue, featuring all of the tracks here (plus much more), this box is now seen mainly as a collector's piece.

== Track listing ==
=== CD 1 ===
No.	Title	Writer(s)	Original album	Length
1.	"Mr. Torture"	Kusch	The Dark Ride	3:28
2.	"I Can"	Deris, Weikath	Better Than Raw	4:39
3.	"Power"	Weikath	The Time of the Oath	3:28
4.	"Where The Rain Grows"	Weikath, Deris	Master of the Rings	4:46
5.	"Eagle Fly Free"	Weikath	Keeper of the Seven Keys, Pt. 2	5:08
6.	"Future World"	Hansen	Keeper of the Seven Keys, Pt. 1	4:02
7.	"Metal Invaders"	Hansen	Walls of Jericho	4:10
8.	"Murderer (Remix)"	Hansen	Helloween	4:33
9.	"Starlight (Remix)"	Weikath, Hansen	Helloween	4:13
10.	"How Many Tears"	Weikath	Walls of Jericho	7:15
11.	"Ride The Sky (Remix)"	Hansen	Walls of Jericho	6:43
12.	"Halloween"	Hansen	Keeper of the Seven Keys, Pt. 1	13:18
13.	"A Little Time"	Kiske	Keeper of the Seven Keys, Pt. 1	3:59
14.	"A Tale That Wasn't Right"	Weikath	Keeper of the Seven Keys, Pt. 1	4:42
15.	"I Want Out"	Hansen	Keeper of the Seven Keys, Pt. 2	4:41

=== CD 2 ===
No.	Title	Writer(s)	Original album	Length
1.	"Keeper Of The Seven Keys (remix)"	Weikath	Keeper of the Seven Keys, Pt. 2	13:50
2.	"Dr. Stein (remix)"	Weikath	Keeper of the Seven Keys, Pt. 2	5:03
3.	"The Chance"	Grapow	Pink Bubbles Go Ape	3:46
4.	"Windmill"	Weikath	Chameleon	5:12
5.	"Sole Survivor"	Weikath, Deris	Master of the Rings	4:30
6.	"Perfect Gentleman"	Weikath, Deris	Master of the Rings	3:53
7.	"In The Middle Of A Heartbeat"	Weikath, Deris	Master of the Rings	4:30
8.	"Kings Will Be Kings"	Weikath	The Time of the Oath	5:08
9.	"Time Of The Oath"	Grapow, Deris	The Time of the Oath	6:56
10.	"Forever And One (Neverland)"	Deris	The Time of the Oath	3:50
11.	"Midnight Sun"	Weikath	Better Than Raw	6:19
12.	"Mr. Ego (Take Me Down)"	Grapow	Master of the Rings	7:07
13.	"Immortal"	Deris	The Dark Ride	4:04
14.	"Mirror Mirror"	Deris	The Dark Ride	3:43

=== CD 3 ===
(Buried Treasure, bonus CD)

No.	Title	Writer(s)	Length
1.	"Shit And Lobster"	Grosskopf	4:10
2.	"Oriental Journey"	Grapow	5:44
3.	"I Don't Care, You Don't Care"	Weikath	4:00
4.	"Ain't Got Nothing Better"	Grosskopf	4:39
5.	"Moshi Moshi - Shiki No Uta (live)"	Kusch, Grapow	6:49
6.	"Can't Fight Your Desire"	Deris	3:45
7.	"Star Invasion"	Deris, Weikath	4:48
8.	"Silicon Dreams"	Grosskopf	4:17
9.	"Grapowski's Malmsuite 1001 (In D Doll)"	Grapow	6:33
10.	"The Hellion / Electric Eye" (Judas Priest cover)	Halford, Downing, Tipton	4:07
11.	"A Game We Shouldn't Play"	Deris	3:38

== Credits ==
- Andi Deris - vocals (CD1: track 1–4, CD2: track 5–14, CD3: track 6–8, 10, 11)
- Michael Kiske - vocals (CD1: track 5, 6, 9, 12–15 CD2: track 1–4, CD3: track 1, 3, 4)
- Kai Hansen - vocals (CD1: track 7–8, 10–11) guitar, background vocals (CD1: track 5–15, CD2: track 1, 2)
- Michael Weikath - guitar (CD1: all tracks, CD2: all tracks, CD3: 1–4, 6–11)
- Roland Grapow - guitar (CD1: track 1–4, CD2: track 3–14, CD3: all tracks
- Markus Grosskopf - bass (CD1: all tracks, CD2: all tracks, CD3: 1–4, 6–11)
- Uli Kusch - drums (CD1: track 1–4, CD2: track 5–14, CD3: track 5–11)
- Ingo Schwichtenberg - drums (CD1: track 5–15, CD2: track 1–4, CD3: track 1–4)

== Charts ==
Chart (2002)	Peak position
German Albums (Offizielle Top 100)	93
Japanese Albums (Oricon)	62
