= Live in the U.K. =

Live album by Helloween
- Released: Europe\USA 6 April 1989; Japan 5 October 1989
- Recorded: November 1988
- Venue: Edinburgh Playhouse, Scotland
- Studio: The Manor Mobile
- Genre: Power metal
- Length: 49:44
- Label: Noise
- Producer: Tommy Hansen

Helloween chronology
Keeper of the Seven Keys: Part II (1988)	Live in the U.K. (1989)	Pink Bubbles Go Ape (1991)

Professional ratings
Review scores
Source	Rating
AllMusic	1.5/5 stars
Hi-Fi News & Record Review	A:2

Live in the U.K. is the first live album by German power metal band Helloween, released in 1989. It was released in Japan as Keepers Live. In the United States, it was released as I Want Out – Live without the track "Rise and Fall", and with a shorter edit of the introduction.

All tracks were recorded in Edinburgh Playhouse, Scotland, by The Manor Mobile on 6 November 1988, except "I Want Out" recorded in Manchester Apollo, England, on 7 November 1988.

This is Helloween's only official live album with drummer Ingo Schwichtenberg, and the only one recorded with vocalist Michael Kiske and guitarist Kai Hansen (who had left the band a few months earlier), until the release of United Alive in Madrid in 2019.

== Album cover ==
For the first time, the "o" in the "Helloween" logo was not represented by a pumpkin. On I Want Out - Live, it was represented by a globe showing portions of Western Europe, Central Europe, and the British Isles. On Live in the U.K. it is instead drawn as a pumpkin logo on a bass drum.

Cover Artwork by Frederick Moulaert.

== Track listing ==
No.	Title	Writer(s)	Length
1.	"Happy Halloween/A Little Time"	Kiske (A Little Time)	6:34*
2.	"Dr. Stein"	Weikath	7:00
3.	"Future World"	Hansen	9:33
4.	"Rise and Fall #"	Weikath	4:51
5.	"We Got the Right"	Kiske	6:08
6.	"I Want Out / Encores"	Hansen	5:58
7.	"How Many Tears"	Weikath	9:40

* 4:17 on I Want Out – Live issue

# absent on I Want Out – Live issue

On Future World, Kiske briefly sings a part from All Shook Up from Elvis Presley.

== Credits ==
- Michael Kiske – vocals
- Kai Hansen – guitar
- Michael Weikath – guitar
- Markus Grosskopf – bass
- Ingo Schwichtenberg – drums
- Jörn Ellerbrock - keyboards

== Charts ==
=== Weekly charts ===
Chart (1989)	Peak position
Austrian Albums (Ö3 Austria)	30
Dutch Albums (Album Top 100)	44
Finnish Albums (The Official Finnish Charts)	4
German Albums (Offizielle Top 100)	14
Japanese Albums (Oricon)	23
Swedish Albums (Sverigetopplistan)	25
UK Albums (OCC)	26
US Billboard 200 I Want Out – Live	123

=== Year-end charts ===
Chart (1989)	Position
German Albums (Offizielle Top 100)	81
