= I Want Out (Helloween song) =

1988 single by Helloween

Single by Helloween

from the album Keeper of the Seven Keys: Part II
- Released: 31 October 1988
- Genre: Power metal; heavy metal
- Length: 4:39
- Label: Noise Records
- Songwriter: Kai Hansen

Helloween singles chronology
"Dr. Stein" (1988)	"I Want Out" (1988)	"Kids of the Century" (1991)

Music video
- "I Want Out" on YouTube

"I Want Out" is a song by German power metal band Helloween from the album Keeper of the Seven Keys: Part II, that was released as a single in 1988.

It was written by Kai Hansen, who denied that it hinted his plans to leave the band, which he did a few months after the single's release.

The promo video was shown on MTV and was directed by Storm Thorgerson. The Guardian called it "[a] follicularly shining example of what a 1980s hair metal video should be."

It is one of Helloween's most recognizable songs, and is often performed live by Helloween and both Hansen's and Kiske's current bands Gamma Ray and Unisonic. The song was covered by HammerFall, Sonata Arctica, Avalanch and Skylark.

== Track listing ==
All songs written by Kai Hansen, except where noted.

No.	Title	Writer(s)	Length
1.	"I Want Out"		4:39
2.	"Save Us"		5:12
3.	"Don't Run for Cover"	Michael Kiske	4:45

== Credits ==
- Michael Kiske - lead vocals
- Kai Hansen - lead and rhythm guitars, backing vocals
- Michael Weikath - lead and rhythm guitars, backing vocals
- Markus Grosskopf - bass guitar
- Ingo Schwichtenberg - drums

== Charts ==
Chart (1988)	Peak position
Switzerland (Schweizer Hitparade)	27
UK Singles (Official Charts)	69

== Cover versions ==
=== HammerFall ===
"I Want Out"

Single by HammerFall

from the album Legacy of Kings
- Released: 31 August 1999
- Recorded: Studio Fredman, Gothenburg, Sweden, April–June, 1998; Hansen Studios, Hamburg, Germany October 1998
- Genre: Power metal, Heavy metal
- Length: 17:56
- Label: Nuclear Blast
- Songwriter: Kai Hansen
- Producers: Track1&3: Kai Hansen, Dirk Schlächter; Track2:Joacim Cans, Fredrik Nordström, Oscar Dronjak

HammerFall singles chronology
"Heeding the Call" (1998)	"I Want Out" (1999)	"Renegade" (2000)

"I Want Out" was released as a cover-single by Swedish power metal band HammerFall on 31 August 1999. It is the second single released from their album Legacy of Kings.

It is notable for Kai Hansen's appearance on guitar, lead vocals (along with Hammerfall's vocalist Joacim Cans) and keyboards.

==== Track listing ====
No.	Title	Writer(s)	Length
1.	"I Want Out"	Kai Hansen	4:37
2.	"At the End of the Rainbow"	Joacim Cans, Martin Albrecht	4:09
3.	"Man on the Silver Mountain"	Ritchie Blackmore, Ronnie James Dio	3:25
4.	"Glory to the Brave" (video clip)		5:45
Total length:			17:56

==== Personnel ====
- Joacim Cans - lead and backing vocals
- Oscar Dronjak - guitar and backing vocals
- Stefan Elmgren - lead guitar
- Magnus Rosén - bass guitar
- Patrik Räfling - drums

==== Additional personnel ====
- Track 1: Vocals, guitar and keyboards by Kai Hansen, backing vocals by Udo Dirkschneider.
- Track 2: Lead guitar by William J. Tsamis.
- Track 3: Drums by AC, backing vocals by Kai Hansen.

==== Charts ====
Chart (1999)	Peak position
Sweden (Sverigetopplistan)	75

==== Release information ====
Limited edition red 7" vinyl single with "I Want Out" on side A and "At the End of the Rainbow" on side B.

=== Others ===
- In 2000, Sonata Arctica released a cover version of this song on two of their EPs, Successor and Takatalvi. It was also released on the Helloween tribute album The Keepers of Jericho - Part I.
- Skylark also covered the song, in the same tribute album, with female vocals.
- Eddy Antonini from the Italian power metal band Skylark also performs a cover of this song along with several guest musicians on his solo album When Water Became Ice.
- Gamma Ray, Kai Hansen's current band, also performs the song.
- In 2006, the Australian band Lord performed this song live at the Metro Theater in Sydney.
- The Spanish power metal band Avalanch performed a live cover on their Días De Gloria album.
- The Australian power metal band Winterstorm performed this song on their "teaser" demo ...begun and continue to play it at various live shows.
- The Swedish progressive metal band Seventh Wonder performed the song in 2010, during their final concert with Johnny Sandin as drummer. As a surprise to him, they asked him to leave the drum set in the middle of the song and perform vocals in the final section.
- The band Driving Mrs. Satan released a folk singer-style cover of the song in 2013.
- In 2012, Kiske's and Hansen's band, Unisonic, included a live performance of the song at the Loud Park Festival on their Ignition EP.
- The Russian power metal band Epidemia at least once performed the song at a concert
- The Swedish power metal band ShadowQuest covered this song on their second album Gallows of Eden, released in 2020.
