= United Alive in Madrid =

Live album by Helloween
- Released: 4 October 2019
- Recorded: 9 December 2017
- Venue: Madrid, Spain
- Genre: Power metal, Heavy metal
- Length: 161:00
- Label: Nuclear Blast
- Producer: Charlie Bauerfeind

Helloween chronology
My God-Given Right (2015)	United Alive in Madrid (2019)	Helloween (2021)

Professional ratings
Review scores
Source	Rating
Bravewords	8.5/10 stars
Hysteria Mag	8/10 stars
Time for Metal	10/10 stars

United Alive in Madrid is the fourth live album by German power metal band Helloween, released in 2019. The recordings took place during the band's Pumpkins United World Tour (2017–2018), with former members Michael Kiske and Kai Hansen joining Helloween's line-up. This would be the first live album to feature both Kiske and Hansen since 1989's Live in the U.K.. The main concert was recorded on 9 December 2017 at the WiZink Centre in Madrid, Spain and the bonus tracks in Chile, Brazil, Czech Republic and Germany.

The video release United Alive came out on the same day as the live album and contained concert footage filmed during 2017 in Spain and Brazil and during 2018 in Wacken Open Air Festival (Germany). Extra material included bonus concert tracks filmed in Brazil, Czech Republic and Chile, a band interview, as well as LED content and animations shown during the shows.

== Track listing ==
=== Disc one ===
No.	Title	Writer(s)	Vocalist(s)	Length
1.	"Halloween"	Kai Hansen	Michael Kiske, Andi Deris	13:37
2.	"Dr. Stein"	Michael Weikath	Kiske, Deris	5:36
3.	"I’m Alive"	Hansen	Kiske	3:48
4.	"If I Could Fly"	Andi Deris	Deris	4:01
5.	"Are You Metal?"	Deris	Deris	4:28
6.	"Rise and Fall"	Weikath	Kiske	4:22
7.	"Waiting for the Thunder"	Deris	Deris	4:02
8.	"Perfect Gentleman"	Deris, Weikath	Deris, Kiske	4:50
9.	"Kai's Medley (Starlight / Ride the Sky / Judas / Heavy Metal Is the Law)"	Hansen	Kai Hansen	13:52
10.	"Forever and One"	Deris	Deris, Kiske	5:22
11.	"A Tale That Wasn't Right"	Weikath	Kiske, Deris	5:43

=== Disc two ===
No.	Title	Writer(s)	Vocalist(s)	Length
1.	"I Can"	Weikath	Deris	4:57
2.	"Livin' Ain't No Crime / A Little Time"	Weikath / Michael Kiske	Kiske	6:39
3.	"Sole Survivor"	Weikath, Deris	Deris	4:58
4.	"Power"	Weikath	Deris	4:11
5.	"How Many Tears"	Weikath	Deris, Hansen, Kiske	10:56
6.	"Invitation / Eagle Fly Free"	Weikath	Kiske	7:13
7.	"Keeper of the Seven Keys"	Weikath	Kiske, Deris	17:03
8.	"Future World"	Hansen	Kiske	5:36
9.	"I Want Out"	Hansen	Kiske, Deris	8:47

=== Disc three (bonus tracks) ===
No.	Title	Writer(s)	Vocalist(s)	Length
1.	"March of Time"	Hansen	Kiske	5:28
2.	"Kids of the Century"	Kiske	Kiske	4:00
3.	"Why"	Deris	Deris, Kiske	4:40
4.	"Pumpkins United"	Hansen, Deris, Weikath	Deris, Kiske, Hansen	6:32

- Track 1 recorded at Santiago, Chile, 31 October 2018
- Track 2 recorded at Prague, Czech Republic, 25 November 2017
- Track 3 recorded at São Paulo, Brazil, 29 October 2017
- Track 4 recorded at Wacken Open Air Festival, Germany, 4 August 2018

== Personnel ==
- Michael Kiske – vocals
- Andi Deris – vocals
- Kai Hansen – guitars, vocals
- Michael Weikath – guitars
- Sascha Gerstner – guitars
- Markus Grosskopf – bass
- Daniel Löble – drums

== Charts ==
=== Album ===
Chart (2019)	Peak position
Austrian Albums (Ö3 Austria)	47
Belgian Albums (Ultratop Wallonia)	108
Finnish Albums (Suomen virallinen lista)	47
French Albums (SNEP)	125
German Albums (Offizielle Top 100)	4
Hungarian Albums (MAHASZ)	26
Italian Albums (FIMI)	88
Japanese Albums (Oricon)	29
Scottish Albums (OCC)	25
Spanish Albums (PROMUSICAE)	12
Swiss Albums (Schweizer Hitparade)	21
UK Independent Albums (OCC)	16
UK Rock & Metal Albums (OCC)	5

=== Video ===
Chart (2019)	Peak position
Germany (GfK)	1
Japan (Oricon)	5
