= Dr. Stein =

Single by Helloween

from the album Keeper of the Seven Keys: Part II
- B-side: 1. Savage; 2. Livin ain't No Crime
- Released: July 1988
- Genre: Power metal
- Length: 5:03
- Label: Noise Records
- Songwriter: Michael Weikath

Helloween singles chronology
"Future World" (1987)	"Dr. Stein" (1988)	"I Want Out" (1988)

"Dr. Stein" is a song by German power metal band Helloween. Taken from the 1988 album Keeper of the Seven Keys: Part II, the song remains one of the band's most popular numbers, and is played live at virtually every Helloween concert. The lyrics are based on the 1818 Mary Shelley novel Frankenstein; or, The Modern Prometheus.

A video was shot for the 2010 jazz-style remake of the song on the album Unarmed – Best of 25th Anniversary.

== Single track listing ==
No.	Title	Length
1.	"Dr. Stein"	5:03
2.	"Savage"	3:27
3.	"Livin' Ain't No Crime"	4:44
4.	"Victim of Fate*"	7:00

== Personnel ==
- Michael Kiske - vocals
- Kai Hansen - lead and rhythm guitars
- Michael Weikath - lead and rhythm guitars
- Markus Grosskopf - bass guitar
- Ingo Schwichtenberg - drums

== Charts ==
Chart (1988)	Peak position
Japanese Singles (Oricon)	81
Netherlands (Single Top 100)	85
Switzerland (Schweizer Hitparade)	21
UK Singles (OCC)	66
West Germany (GfK)	10
