= Live at Budokan (Helloween album) =

Live album by Helloween
- Released: 13 December 2024
- Recorded: 16 September 2023
- Venues: Budokan, Tokyo, Japan
- Genres: Power metal, Heavy metal
- Length: 120:50
- Label: Reigning Phoenix Music
- Producer: Charlie Bauerfeind

Helloween chronology
| Helloween (2021) | Live at Budokan (2024) | Giants & Monsters (2025) |

Professional ratings
Review scores
| Source | Rating |
|---|---|
| Metal Rules | 5/5 stars |
| Dead Rhetoric | 9/10 stars |
| Blabbermouth | 8/10 stars |

Live at Budokan is the fifth live album by German power metal band Helloween, released in December 2024. The recording took place during the band's performance at Tokyo’s Nippon Budokan in Japan on 16 September 2023 and is the second live release to feature the band’s reunited line up.

The video release contained footage of the full concert filmed during the band’s performance at Nippon Budokan including an additional track named Drumokan. Extra material included backstage footage and animations.

== Track listing ==
=== Disc one ===
| No. | Title | Writer(s) | Vocalist(s) | Length |
|---|---|---|---|---|
| 1. | "Orbit" | Kai Hansen | | 1:58 |
| 2. | "Skyfall" | Kai Hansen | Michael Kiske, Andi Deris, Kai Hansen | 12:51 |
| 3. | "Eagle Fly Free" | Michael Weikath | Kiske | 8:04 |
| 4. | "Mass Pollution" | Andi Deris | Deris | 4:57 |
| 5. | "Future World" | Hansen | Kiske | 5:05 |
| 6. | "Power" | Weikath | Deris | 4:26 |
| 7. | "Save Us" | Hansen | Kiske | 5:16 |
| 8. | "Kai's Medley (Walls Of Jericho / Metal Invaders / Victim Of Fate / Gorgar / Ride the Sky / Heavy Metal Is the Law)" | Hansen | Kai Hansen | 16:07 |
| 9. | "Forever And One (Neverland)" | Deris | Deris, Kiske | 4:45 |

=== Disc two ===
| No. | Title | Writer(s) | Vocalist(s) | Length |
|---|---|---|---|---|
| 1. | "Best Time" | Sascha Gerstner | Kiske, Deris, Hansen | 5:04 |
| 2. | "Dr. Stein" | Weikath | Kiske, Deris | 5:54 |
| 3. | "How Many Tears" | Weikath | Deris, Hansen, Kiske | 12:20 |
| 4. | "Perfect Gentleman" | Deris, Weikath | Deris | 4:53 |
| 5. | "Keeper of the Seven Keys" | Weikath | Kiske, Deris | 20:46 |
| 6. | "I Want Out" | Hansen | Kiske, Deris | 8:24 |

== Personnel ==
- Michael Kiske – vocals
- Andi Deris – vocals
- Kai Hansen – guitars, vocals
- Michael Weikath – guitars
- Sascha Gerstner – guitars
- Markus Grosskopf – bass
- Daniel Löble – drums

== Charts ==
| Chart (2024) | Peak position |
|---|---|
| German Albums (Offizielle Top 100) | 14 |
| Japanese Albums (Oricon) | 44 |
| Swiss Albums (Schweizer Hitparade) | 31 |
