= Walls of Jericho (album) =

Studio album by Helloween
- Released: 18 November 1985
- Recorded: September–October 1985
- Studios: Musiclab Studio (Berlin, West Germany)
- Genres: Speed metal; power metal
- Length: 40:54
- Label: Noise
- Producer: Harris Johns

Helloween chronology
Helloween (1985)	Walls of Jericho (1985)	Keeper of the Seven Keys: Part I (1987)

Professional ratings
Review scores
Source	Rating
AllMusic	3/5 stars
Collector's Guide to Heavy Metal	8/10
Sputnikmusic	4/5 stars

Walls of Jericho is the debut studio album by German power metal band Helloween, released in 1985 on LP by Noise Records. It is the band's only album featuring Kai Hansen as lead vocalist until 2021's Helloween, although he would continue to act as guitarist on the two following albums.

In 1988, Walls of Jericho was released on CD. Due to the enhanced capacity of the CD, the Helloween EP/mini-LP and the song "Judas" from the Judas EP were added to the Walls of Jericho track listing; they are now released as a compilation.

== Track listings ==
=== Original Edition ===
Side one
No.	Title	Writer(s)	Length
1.	"Walls of Jericho"	Michael Weikath, Kai Hansen	0:53
2.	"Ride the Sky"	Hansen	5:54
3.	"Reptile"	Weikath	3:45
4.	"Guardians"	Weikath	4:19
5.	"Phantoms of Death"	Hansen	6:33

Side two
No.	Title	Writer(s)	Length
6.	"Metal Invaders"	Weikath, Hansen	4:10
7.	"Gorgar"	Hansen	3:57
8.	"Heavy Metal (Is the Law)"	Weikath, Hansen	4:08
9.	"How Many Tears"	Weikath	7:15
Total length:			40:54

=== 1987 CD Edition ===
No.	Title	Writer(s)	Length
1.	"Starlight"	Weikath, Hansen	5:17
2.	"Murderer"	Hansen	4:26
3.	"Warrior"	Hansen	4:00
4.	"Victim of Fate"	Hansen	6:37
5.	"Cry for Freedom"	Weikath, Hansen	6:02
6.	"Walls of Jericho / Ride the Sky"	Weikath, Hansen	6:45
7.	"Reptile"	Weikath	3:45
8.	"Guardians"	Weikath	4:19
9.	"Phantoms of Death"	Hansen	6:33
10.	"Metal Invaders"	Weikath, Hansen	4:10
11.	"Gorgar"	Hansen	3:57
12.	"Heavy Metal (Is the Law)"	Weikath, Hansen	4:08
13.	"How Many Tears"	Weikath	7:15
14.	"Judas"	Hansen	4:43
Total length:			71:57

1989 Japanese version bonus track
No.	Title	Writer(s)	Length
15.	"Don't Run for Cover"	Michael Kiske	4:47

=== 2006 Remastered & Expanded Edition ===
Disc one is the same as above.

Disc two
No.	Title	Writer(s)	Length
1.	"Murderer" (remix)	Hansen	4:34
2.	"Ride the Sky" (remix)	Hansen	6:46
3.	"Intro / Ride the Sky" (live)	Hansen	7:17
4.	"Guardians" (live)	Weikath	4:26
5.	"Oernst of Life"	Weikath	4:46
6.	"Metal Invaders" (demo version)	Weikath, Hansen	4:37
7.	"Surprise Track (White Christmas - I'll Be Your Santa Claus)"	Traditional	2:08
Total length:			34:34

- Tracks 1 & 2 also appear on the album Treasure Chest
- Tracks 3 & 4 also appear on the Judas EP
- Tracks 5 & 6 also appear on the Death Metal compilation
- Track 7 also appears on the Helloween EP

=== 2024 Remastered Edition ===
The 2024 remastered edition places the tracks from the original release, plus Judas and live versions of Ride the Sky and Guardians on disc one. Disc two contains the Helloween EP tracks, followed by Oernst of Light and Metal Invaders from the Death Metal sampler, and remixes of Murderer and Ride the Sky.

Disc one
No.	Title	Length
1.	"Walls of Jericho/Ride the Sky"
2.	"Reptile"
3.	"Guardians"
4.	"Phantoms of Death"
5.	"Metal Invaders"
6.	"Gorgar"
7.	"Heavy Metal (Is the Law)"
8.	"How Many Tears"
9.	"Judas"
10.	"Ride the Sky" (live)
11.	"Guardians" (live)

Disc two
No.	Title	Length
1.	"Starlight"
2.	"Murderer"
3.	"Warrior"
4.	"Victim of Fate"
5.	"Cry for Freedom"
6.	"Oernst of Light" (from Death Metal sampler)
7.	"Metal Invaders" (from Death Metal sampler)
8.	"Murderer" (remix)
9.	"Ride the Sky" (remix)

== Notes ==
- In the liner notes, members of the band are credited with "vrrr" (vocals), "grrr" (guitars), "brrr" (bass) and "drrr" (drums).
- The second pressing of an unofficial 1991 cassette release by MG Records comes with a yellow top right corner, a pink stripe in the top right corner, a pink spine, and a pink/black label logo on the front cover. The third pressing in 1992 comes with a blue top right corner, a yellow stripe in the top right corner, a pink background on the front cover, and a black band logo on the front cover.
- An unofficial 1991 cassette release by Tact adds the song "Starlight".
- An unofficial 1993 cassette release by Euro Star adds the song "Judas". The second pressing comes with a green background behind the tracklist, green border around the album art, the band name in green, and the album title in blue.
- The track list on the back cover of the 1993 CD release by Futurist lists "Walls of Jericho" and "Ride the Sky" as separate tracks instead of the actual CD where they are joint.
- An unofficial 1997 cassette release by Audio Max excludes "Heavy Metal (Is the Law)" and "Judas".
- The track list on the back cover of the 1997 re-release by Noise Records is incorrect, which lists "Walls of Jericho" and "Ride the Sky" as joint songs.
- An unofficial 2001 CD release by Agat Company contains the 1987 album Keeper of the Seven Keys: Part I.
- The 2002 release by Sauron Music has the lyrics in Korean.

== Personnel ==
Helloween

- Kai Hansen – vocals, guitar
- Michael Weikath – guitar
- Markus Grosskopf – bass
- Ingo Schwichtenberg – drums

Additional musicians

- James Hardway – E-mu Emulator II

Production

- Harris Johns – production, engineering, mixing
- Edda and Uwe Karczewski – cover design
- Michael Weikath – cover concept
- Peter Vahlefeld – layout, typography

== Charts ==
Chart (1989)	Peak position
Japanese Albums (Oricon)	40

Chart (2025)	Peak position
Croatian International Albums (HDU)	28

== Trivia ==
- The titular entity in the song "Gorgar" is the first talking pinball machine ever produced.
- The main theme of Edvard Grieg's "In the Hall of the Mountain King" is used in the song "Gorgar."
- The intro to "Starlight" is taken from a commercial in the movie Halloween III: Season of the Witch.
- The song "Heavy Metal (Is the Law)" is not an official live recording. Rather, crowd noise was added.
- The live versions of "Ride the Sky" and "Guardians" are not live recordings; they are the same songs as found on Walls of Jericho but with crowd noise mixed in. The actual live versions of the two songs appeared only on the original 12" vinyl edition of the "Judas" single.
- Professional wrestler Chris Jericho took his ring name and the name of his submission maneuver from the title of this album.
