= Chameleon (Helloween album) =

Studio album by Helloween
- Released: 31 May 1993
- Recorded: 1992
- Studio: Chateau du Pape, Hamburg, Germany, mixed at Scream Studios, Los Angeles, United States
- Genre: Heavy metal
- Length: 71:26; 112:35 (with bonus tracks)
- Label: EMI
- Producer: Helloween; Tommy Hansen; Michael Tibes

Helloween chronology
Pink Bubbles Go Ape (1991)	Chameleon (1993)	Master of the Rings (1994)

Singles from Chamelon
- 1. "When the Sinner" Released: 21 May 1993; 2. "I Don't Wanna Cry No More" Released: 22 September 1993; 3. "Windmill" Released: 16 December 1993; 4. "Step Out of Hell" Released: 16 December 1993

Professional ratings
Review scores
Source	Rating
AllMusic	2/5 stars

Chameleon is the fifth studio album by German power metal band Helloween, released in 1993. It is their most musically adventurous release, but also their least commercially successful, and is their last studio album to feature singer Michael Kiske until 2021's self-titled album, as well as their last with original drummer Ingo Schwichtenberg. Chameleon was also the band's last album on EMI Records.

== Background ==
The album contains four singles: "When the Sinner", "I Don't Wanna Cry No More", "Windmill", and "Step Out of Hell".

The album received negative reviews both critically and commercially, and vocalist Michael Kiske and drummer Ingo Schwichtenberg were fired after the subsequent promotional tour.

Michael Weikath stated that 'Chameleon' could have been better with a different approach but it was the result of what was there at the time and the intentions they had with it. The band were lambasted with debts of the amount of two million Deutschmarks (equivalent to £800,000 as of 2025), and were just trying to get rid of that and thought that if they made the album commercial it would work. "Step Out of Hell" was one of the older tracks Roland Grapow had done with his old band Rampage, which was released originally as a track called "Victims of Rock". Grapow changed the lyrics and he remade it as a song with Helloween. The lyrics dealt with Ingo Schwichtenberg. Grapow's song "Music" was also recorded differently and bluesier with other lyrics by Rampage. It's on the second record they did in 1983 "Love Lights Up The Night".

There was a lot of 1970s era in the song “Music” and in his guitar part on “When The Sinner.” He was listening a lot to Stevie Ray Vaughan at the time and was also influenced by Brian May. Grapow stated that 'Chameleon' was something that the band needed to do. Helloween wanted to change the musical direction and try some new material. That was the main reason. There wasn't any pressure from the label or from the outside. Nobody at the label heard the demos, and the band had 100% control.

A problem during the 'Chameleon' recording was that Grapow was still new in the band at the time and he didn't know which way he should approach. Grapow was replacing Kai Hansen, and tried to write songs with a heavy metal direction, which he did on 'Pink Bubbles Go Ape'. He thought he did a good job, but the other band members, the songwriters, they had changed. Helloween recorded the successful 'Keeper' albums and then Hansen left, and they tried to do totally different kind of music. Grapow described 'Chameleon' as the three Helloween songwriters' solo record.

Bass player Markus Grosskopf stated that 'Chameleon' captured the time and the mood that the band was in, so he doesn't see it as a mistake. Helloween was not able to do anything different, and they weren't interested in doing anything else. Grosskopf thought that 'Chameleon' had to be done like that, to come to a point where the band had to change themselves. Grosskopf thought 'Chameleon' was a cool album, but it sounded a bit weird with Helloween written on it. It was a difficult album to make because they had some serious personal problems at that time.

Singer Michael Kiske stated that the best way to describe 'Chameleon' was that it's a three men solo album. There were three songwriters trying to make a solo record. Helloween was dysfunctional and were not functioning as a band anymore. When they did the “Chameleon” record, it was still an honest record, they did the best they could out of the situation, but they were not a band. The members weren't working together to get the songs. Ingo Schwichtenberg was very sick and the album recording was the last thing he did. After he did the drumming he had a breakdown. It was not a pleasant time. But Kiske thinks the record shows that in a way, that there were some very dramatic stuff on it when you look at some of the lyrics.

Ingo Schwichtenberg was replaced by drummer Richie Abdel-Nabi on the short tour of the album, in which, according to Weikath, they would play venues only a quarter sold out. It was the last album Schwichtenberg recorded; he committed suicide on 8 March 1995 by jumping in front of an S-Bahn train in his hometown Hamburg.

== Track listing ==
No.	Title	Writer(s)	Length
1.	"First Time"	Michael Weikath	5:29
2.	"When the Sinner"	Michael Kiske	6:54
3.	"I Don't Wanna Cry No More"	Roland Grapow	5:11
4.	"Crazy Cat"	Grapow	3:29
5.	"Giants"	Weikath	6:34
6.	"Windmill"	Weikath	5:12
7.	"Revolution Now"	Weikath	8:04
8.	"In the Night"	Kiske	5:36
9.	"Music"	Grapow	7:00
10.	"Step Out of Hell"	Grapow	4:21
11.	"I Believe"	Kiske	9:12
12.	"Longing"	Kiske	4:10
Total length:			71:26

Expanded edition bonus tracks
No.	Title	Writer(s)	Length
1.	"I Don't Care, You Don't Care"	Weikath	4:01
2.	"Oriental Journey"	Grapow	5:43
3.	"Cut in the Middle"	Markus Grosskopf	3:57
4.	"Introduction"	Weikath	3:52
5.	"Get Me out of Here"	Weikath	2:50
6.	"Red Socks and the Smell of Trees"	Helloween	10:48
7.	"Ain't Got Nothing Better"	Grosskopf	4:41
8.	"Windmill (Demo Version)"	Weikath	5:28

- M – 1,2 also appears on the When The Sinner single.
- M – 3,4,5 also appears on the Windmill & Step Out of Hell singles.
- M – 6,7 also appears on the I Don't Wanna Cry No More single.

== Personnel ==
=== Helloween ===
- Michael Kiske – vocals, rhythm guitar on "When the Sinner", "In the Night", and "I Believe"
- Michael Weikath – guitars
- Roland Grapow – guitars, acoustic guitars
- Markus Grosskopf – bass
- Ingo Schwichtenberg – drums

=== Guests ===
- Axel Bergstedt – conductor, church organ in "I Believe"
- Children's choir of the Orchestra "Johann Sebastian Bach", Hamburg in "I Believe"
- Stefan Pintev – violin

Three of the children of the children's choir are Aminata, Jazz and Sophie from Black Buddafly, who had been 12 and 13 years old when they sang for Chameleon.

== Charts ==
Chart (1993)	Peak position
Finnish Albums (The Official Finnish Charts)	15
German Albums (Offizielle Top 100)	35
Japanese Albums (Oricon)	8
Swedish Albums (Sverigetopplistan)	35
Swiss Albums (Schweizer Hitparade)	30

== Recording information ==
- Recorded in 1992 at Chateau De Pape in Hamburg, Germany
- Mixed in 1992 at Scream Studios in Los Angeles, United States
- Mastered at Precision Mastering, Hollywood, United States
- Produced by Helloween and Tommy Hansen, assisted by Michael Tibes
- Mixed by Michael Wagener at Double Trouble Productions Inc., assisted by Craig Boubet
- Mastered by Stephen Marcussen
- Logo by Michael Weikath and sleeve design by Michael Kiske
- All songs are published by Zomba Music Publishers (LTD) S.F. USA
