= Past in Different Ways =

Past In Different Ways

Studio album by Michael Kiske
- Released: May 9, 2008
- Genre: Rock, power metal, acoustic rock
- Length: 52:43
- Label: Frontiers
- Producer: Michael Kiske

Michael Kiske chronology
Kiske (2006)	Past In Different Ways (2008)

Professional ratings
Review scores
Source	Rating
Hardrock Haven	9.5/10 stars
Dangerdog	3/5 stars

Past in Different Ways is the fourth solo album of vocalist Michael Kiske. It features acoustic renditions of songs written by Kiske during his time in Helloween and one new track.

The album received a rather mixed critical support. Most reviewers were excited about the new acoustic arrangements and especially about Kiske's still powerful voice and wide vocal range. Other reviews criticized the album for the fact that it lacked any major innovative arrangements.

It was released on 9 May 2008 with cover art credited to Carl André Beckston.

According to Michael Kiske, Past In Different Ways "on one hand shows that I don't reject my past just because I'm a different person today, and on the other hand it can maybe give people who were part of that past a different view at those songs. It's my music, I can still identify myself with its spirit...I generally brought each song down to its basics, threw out useless weight and sometimes changed the key to make them sound better as acoustics; and I was surprised how well they worked like that".

Kiske said in 2006: "The good first HELLOWEEN years (with Kai Hansen) were also absolutely great; I don't reject them at all! And I think it was a good idea from Serafino (Frontiers Records) to give my songs of the past a new acoustic sound that fits me today. Because on one hand this shows that I don't reject my past; and on the other hand, it can also give some (more open and intelligent) people another perspective at those songs. And if anyone doesn't like that idea. No one forces him or her to listen to it! These new recordings will NOT AT ALL sound like HELLOWEEN or metal, so it is VERY stupid to put it the way some do."

== Track listing ==
1. "You Always Walk Alone" - 4:25
2. "We Got the Right" - 4:49
3. "I Believe" - 7:45
4. "Longing" - 4:09
5. "Your Turn" - 5:59
6. "Kids of the Century" - 4:24
7. "In the Night" - 5:07
8. "Going Home" - 3:30
9. "A Little Time" - 3:57
10. "When the Sinner" - 5:33
11. "Different Ways" (new track) - 3:05

Japanese bonus track

12. "How the Web Was Woven" – 3:35

All songs by Michael Kiske, except "How the Web Was Woven" by David Most and Clive Westlake.

== Credits ==
Band members

- Michael Kiske – vocals, guitar, keyboard
- Sandro Giampietro – guitar
- Fontaine Burnett – bass guitar
- Karsten Nagel – drums

Guest musicians

- Hanmari Spiegel – violins, piano on track 10
- George Spiegel – accordion, trombone
- Benny Brown – trumpet on track 2
