= SupaRed =

Supared

Studio album by Supared
- Released: 20 January 2003
- Genre: Rock
- Length: 55:10
- Label: Noise/Sanctuary
- Producer: Michael Kiske

Professional ratings
Review scores
Source	Rating
Metal Rules	2/5 stars

SupaRed is an album by SupaRed, a band led by Helloween vocalist Michael Kiske. It was released on Helloween's former record label Noise Records.

== Background ==
Kiske both produced and mixed the album by himself. The album was recorded in Kiskes own studio. It was a songwriting process and then the band members gradually recorded it. The guitars were recorded live at times.

He said in 2003: "Rock music as such is just a band story. With the solo albums I just had a lot to do with myself, had to sort and redefine a lot. At that point it was just fine to do solo records, but rock music is not for solo artists."

Kiske wanted a name that cannot be defined immediately, that has no special meaning, but just sounded good. Translated, it actually means nothing, except strong red.

He also said 2003: "I think it's unfair to compare Supared to Helloween, I know that people will compare it no matter what I think of it. It goes with the territory. You can't really compare the music, because it's an entirely different band."

Sandro Giampietro played guitar on Kiske's solo works Kiske (2006) and "Past In Different Ways" (2008), and was a co-songwriter for Unisonic on the songs "Blood" and "Manhunter" on the album "Light of Dawn" (2014).

== Track listing ==
1. "Reconsider" - 4:12
2. "Can I Know Now?" - 4:46
3. "Let's Be Heroes" - 4:16
4. "He Pretends" - 3:56
5. "Freak-Away" - 3:46
6. "Hey" - 4:55
7. "Boiling Points Of No Reburn" - 4:00
8. "Ride On" - 5:00
9. "Hackneyed" - 3:33
10. "That's Why" - 3:00
11. "A Bit Of Her" - 4:02
12. "Overrated" - 3:33
13. "Dancers Bug" - 2:34
14. "Turn It" - 3:24

All songs are written by Kiske. Except 1. Kiske/Taraxes, and 10. Kiske/Giampietro.

== Credits ==
=== Band members ===
- Michael Kiske – vocals, guitar, keyboard
- Sandro Giampietro – guitars
- Aldo Harms – Bass
- Jurgen Spiegel – drums
