= Instant Clarity =

Studio album by Michael Kiske
- Released: 17 August 1996
- Genre: Hard rock, heavy metal
- Length: 55:28
- Label: Victor
- Producer: Michael Kiske

Michael Kiske chronology
Instant Clarity (1996)	Readiness to Sacrifice (1999)

Professional ratings
Review scores
Source	Rating
Hardrock Haven	(7.7/10)
Rock Is Life	4/5 stars

Instant Clarity is the first solo album of vocalist Michael Kiske, formerly of Helloween. The album was released 1996 and features guest appearances by Kai Hansen, formerly of Helloween, Adrian Smith of Iron Maiden, and compositions with Ciriaco Taraxes.

A music video was produced and filmed in New York City for the song Always, which was dedicated to Ingo Schwichtenberg; the former Helloween drummer who committed suicide in 1995.

"The Calling" was released as a single-EP in Japan, and "Always" was released instead in the UK. Both EPs have the same bonus tracks not available on the album. These tracks were "Rock'N'Roll Is Dead" and "When You're Down On Your Knees That's When You're Closest To Heaven".

The album was reissued in 2006 containing four bonus tracks recorded in the sessions for his solo album "Kiske" released 2006.

== Background ==
Kiske said about the album 2013: "I think the 'Instant Clarity' record was rather easy because there was good money support, especially from Japan. Then I had Kai [Hansen] and Adrian Smith (Iron Maiden) there for support. And I was renting a house and we had everything set up there. That was quite fun to do. Then it got difficult afterwards when you don’t reach the sales for certain record companies. You get less money and you have less available production – that makes it more difficult. I actually lost interest, to be honest with you. Looking back now, maybe the Instant Clarity album still had a bit of the…drive of the past, it was still in there. Then I completely lost interest. I was interested in other things. I was studying things, reading books every day. There was this request for another record and I made one, but it wasn’t until 2006 when I got interested again."

== Track listing ==
1. "Be True to Yourself" (Kiske) - 4:40
2. "The Calling" (Kiske, Hansen, Adrian Smith) - 4:00
3. "Somebody Somewhere" (Ciriaco Taraxes, Michael Kiske) - 4:39
4. "Burned Out" (Taraxes) - 4:44
5. "New Horizons" (Smith, Kiske, Kai Hansen) - 4:25
6. "Hunted" (Kiske, Taraxes) - 4:25
7. "Always" (Kiske) - 4:15
8. "Thanx a Lot!" (Kiske) - 5:25
9. "Time's Passing By" (Kay Rudi Wolke, Taraxes) - 3:46
10. "So Sick" (Kiske) - 4:30
11. "Do I Remember a Life?" (Kiske, Taraxes) - 10:20
12. "A Song Is Just a Moment" (Kiske) [japanese bonus track] - 4:20
13. "I Don't Deserve Love" (Kiske) [bonus track] - 4:40
14. "Sacred Grounds" (Kiske) [bonus track] - 4:05
15. "Can't Tell" (Kiske) [bonus track] - 3:22

Tracks 13–15 appear on the 2006 reissue only. These tracks were recorded at the sessions for the 'Kiske' solo album released 2006.

== Credits ==
Band members

- Michael Kiske – vocals, guitar, keyboards, sound effects
- Ciriaco Taraxes – guitar
- Jens Mencl – bass guitar
- Kay Rudi Wolke – drums, guitar on 9

Guest musicians

- Kai Hansen – guitar on 1,2,5 and 8
- Adrian Smith – guitar on 2,5 and 6
- Norbert Krietemeyer – flute
