= Mike Campese =

American guitarist and composer

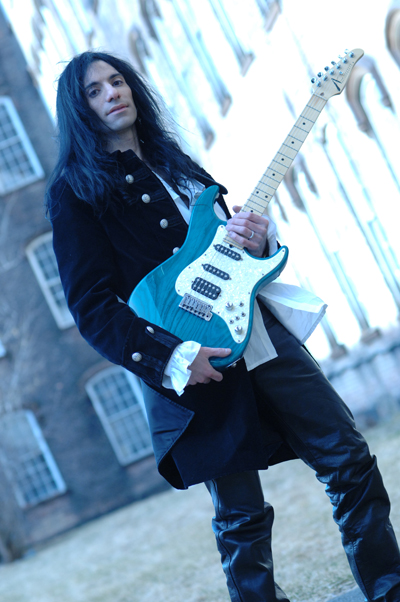

Background information
- Born: Mike Campese
- Genres: Instrumental rock, progressive rock, rock
- Instrument: Guitar
- Years active: 2000-present
- Formerly of: Trans-Siberian Orchestra
- Website: www.mikecampese.com

Mike Campese (born April 2, in Albany, New York) is an American guitarist and composer best known for being a member of the multi-platinum group Trans-Siberian Orchestra. Campese was picked over several guitarists in 2005 during the band's fourth CD, The Lost Christmas Eve, and received a gold record for his work. In 2008 Mike released his own rock Christmas CD, The Meaning of Christmas, which was well received. Campese is an honors graduate from the Musicians Institute in Hollywood, California and is a graduate of Shaker High School.

== Biography ==
Campese appeared on the Jason Becker tribute CD Warmth In The Wilderness, which was released internationally on the Lion Music record label, and his music was featured in a Lions Gate movie, "Vampire Assassins". Mike has been featured in national magazines such as Guitar One, Guitar World and Guitar Player and is a columnist for these publications Mike also writes many online guitar columns on sites such as Guitar Nine, Premier Guitar and Shred Academy Campese has done many masterclasses all over the world, in Sept of 2022, the Abbey Road Institute in Paris, hired Mike to do a series of events. Mike has released eleven solo CDs under his name, his second album, Full Circle, was featured on National Public Radio (NPR) stations across the country and was on regular rotation.

Mike continues to tour with his trio and as a solo artist and has opened and performed with many national acts such as The B-52's, the Spin Doctors, KC and The Sunshine Band, Dokken, Sebastian Bach, Lou Reed, Yngwie Malmsteen, Michael Schenker, the members of Yes and Asia, Kip Winger and many more. Campese was a performer at the Max's Kansas City benefit in 2002 and shared the stage with members of the Bob Dylan band and The Smithereens. Mike performed on the Crüe Fest 2 tour, which featured Mötley Crüe, Godsmack, Drowning Pool, Theory of a Deadman, Rev Theory and more.

Mike's trio was featured on Fox 23, WXXA-TV and Sound Visions which aired across the country. Currently, Mike has been performing at the largest trade show in the world, the winter NAMM Show. In October 2022, Campese is on the cover and is featured in Italy's premier guitar magazine, Axe Magazine. Mike Campese was inducted into the Thomas Edison Music Hall of Fame in 2023. The ceremony took place on March 27, 2023 at the Universal Preservation Hall in Saratoga Springs, NY. Campese is a versatile musician, he describes his style as rock fusion and writes vocal and instrumental arrangements, electric and acoustic. Mike is also the uncle of Brian Chesky, co-founder and CEO of Airbnb, whom he also taught guitar for a period of time.

== Discography ==
=== Solo albums ===
- Total Freedom digitally remastered (2001)
- Full Circle (2000)
- Vibe (2003)
- The New (2005)
- Hidden Treasures (2006)
- The Meaning of Christmas (2008)
- Electric City (2010)
- Chameleon (2013)
- Chapters (2016)
- The Fire Within (2018)
- Reset (2022)
- 12 (2026)

== Other projects ==
- Mr Strange "All This Time"
- Mr Strange "Hey The World"
- Jeckyl and Hyde Jeckyl and Hyde

== TV and movie ==
- Fox 23
- Soundvisions
- Vampire Assassin, Lions Gate (2005)

== Other appearances ==
- Nationwide Compilation by Rodell R (1995)
- Warmth in the Wilderness Jason Becker Tribute (Lion Music) (2001)
- Marius Danielsen - Legend of Valley Doom part 2 (2018)
