= Legend of Valley Doom part 2 =

Marius Danielsen's Legend of Valley Doom Part 2

Studio album by Marius Danielsen
- Released: 30 November 2018
- Recorded: 2017
- Genre: Symphonic power metal
- Length: 72:12
- Label: Crime Records
- Producer: Marius Danielsen, Angelo Emanuele Buccolieri

Marius Danielsen chronology
Marius Danielsen's Legend of Valley Doom Part 1 (2015)	Marius Danielsen's Legend of Valley Doom Part 2 (2018)	Marius Danielsen's Legend of Valley Doom Part 3 (2021)

Marius Danielsen's Legend of Valley Doom Part 2 is the second full-length album by Marius Danielsen's project Legend of Valley Doom. It is a concept album and a rock opera featuring many guest musicians. The plot of the album continues the story started on Legend of Valley Doom Part 1. It was released on 30 November 2018, with cover art credited to Dusan Markovic.

== Track listing ==
All tracks are written by Marius Danielsen, Peter Danielsen.

No.	Title	Guest Vocalist	Length
1.	"King Thorgan's Hymn"	Michael Kiske, Daniel Heiman	3:38
2.	"Rise of the Dark Empire"	Mark Boals, Simon Byron	6:49
3.	"Gates of Eunomia"	Alessio Garavello	2:29
4.	"Tower of Knowledge"	Mathias Blad	5:52
5.	"Visions of the Night"	Alessio Garavello	6:08
6.	"Crystal Mountains"	Diego Valdez, Raphael Mendes	7:15
7.	"By the Dragon's Breath"	Blaze Bayley, Per Johansson	6:19
8.	"Under the Silver Moon"	Jan Thore Grefstad, Kai Somby	6:23
9.	"Angel of Light"	Michael Kiske, Daniel Heiman	6:28
10.	"Princess Lariana's Forest"	Olaf Hayer, Anniken Rasmussen	9:22
11.	"Temple of the Ancient God"	Michele Luppi, Daniel Heiman	7:56
12.	"We Stand Together"	Tim Owens	3:33
Total length:			72:12

== Credits ==
- Marius Danielsen (Darkest Sins) – Vocals, Guitars
- Stian Kristoffersen (Pagan's Mind) – Drums
- Peter Danielsen (Darkest Sins) – Keyboards

=== Guests ===
==== Musicians ====
- Guitar
  - Bruce Kulick (ex-Kiss) – track 11
  - Matias Kupiainen (Stratovarius) – track 2
  - Jennifer Batten (ex-Michael Jackson) – track 8
  - Tracy G (ex-Dio) – track 6
  - Jens Ludwig (Edguy) – track 7
  - Tom Naumann (Primal Fear) – track 4
  - Jimmy Hedlund (Falconer) – tracks 7, 9
  - Timo Somers (Delain) – track 9
  - Olivier Lapauze (Heavenly) – track 9
  - Luca Princiotta (Doro) – track 10
  - Andy Midgley (Neonfly) – track 5
  - Mike Campese – track 9
  - Billy Johnston (Beecake) – track 8
  - Sigurd Kårstad (Darkest Sins) – track 2
- Bass
  - Jari Kainulainen (ex-Stratovarius, Masterplan) – tracks 5, 6, 10
  - Barend Courbois (Blind Guardian) – track 9
  - Magnus Rosén (ex-HammerFall) – track 7
  - Jonas Kuhlberg (Cain's Offering) – track 2
  - Giorgio Novarino (ex-Bejelit) – tracks 1, 3, 4, 11 12
  - Rick Martin (Beecake) – track 8
- Keyboards
  - Steve Williams (Power Quest) – track 11

==== Singers ====
- Marius Danielsen (Darkest Sins) – tracks 2, 3, 5, 10 & 12
- Michael Kiske (Helloween, Unisonic) – tracks 1 & 9
- Blaze Bayley (ex-Iron Maiden, Wolvesbane) – track 7
- Tim Owens (ex-Judas Priest, ex-Iced Earth) – track 12
- Mark Boals (ex-Yngwie Malmsteen, ex-Royal Hunt) – track 2
- Daniel Heiman (ex-Lost Horizon, Heed) – tracks 1, 9 & 11
- Michele Luppi (Whitesnake, ex-Vision Divine) – track 11
- Olaf Hayer (ex-Luca Turilli, Symphonity) – track 10
- Mathias Blad (Falconer) – track 4
- Alessio Garavello (ex-Power Quest, A New Tomorrow) – tracks 3 & 5
- Jan Thore Grefstad (Highland Glory, Saint Deamon) – track 8
- Diego Valdez (Helker, Iron Mask) – track 6
- Raphael Mendes (Urizen) – track 6
- Per Johansson (Ureas) – track 7
- Anniken Rasmussen (Darkest Sins) – track 10
- Peter Danielsen (Darkest Sins) – track 3
