= Keeper of the Seven Keys: Part II =

Studio album by Helloween
- Released: 5 September 1988
- Recorded: May–June 1988
- Studios: Horus Sound Studio, Hanover, Germany
- Genre: Power metal
- Length: 49:23
- Label: Noise
- Producers: Tommy Newton, Tommy Hansen

Helloween chronology
Keeper of the Seven Keys: Part I (1987)	Keeper of the Seven Keys: Part II (1988)	Live in the U.K. (1989)

Singles from Keeper of the Seven Keys: Part II
- 1. "Dr. Stein" Released: 6 August 1988; 2. "I Want Out" Released: 31 October 1988

Keeper of the Seven Keys: Part II is the third studio album by German power metal band Helloween, released on 5 September 1988. The album sold well, and success bloomed all over Europe, Asia, and even the United States. The album went gold in Germany and reached No. 108 in the US.

Two singles were released from the album, "Dr. Stein" and "I Want Out". "Dr. Stein" has a very long and moody solo, played with a blues tinge, very unlike other solos on the album, as well as an organ solo. "I Want Out" remains one of the band's best-known songs, and has been covered by several metal bands, such as Gamma Ray (which Kai Hansen formed after leaving Helloween itself), Unisonic (co-founded by Michael Kiske, after he left Helloween), HammerFall, LORD and Sonata Arctica. It is their last album to feature Hansen until 2021's self-titled album.

The title track "Keeper of the Seven Keys" remained the band's longest song until being surpassed by "King for a Thousand Years", from Keeper of the Seven Keys: The Legacy (2005).

== Background ==
The recording of the album ran 24 hours a day between May and June 1988. Tommy Newton would work during the daytime and Tommy Hansen took over at night until Karl Walterbach (Noise Records) fired Tommy Hansen from the project. Newton claimed that if he mixed 'Eagle Fly Free' on his own he could make it sound more modern and so wanted to continue on his own. After the preview mix of 'Eagle Fly Free', Tommy Hansen was sent home.

== Critical reception ==
Professional ratings
Review scores
Source	Rating
AllMusic	3/5 stars
Blabbermouth.net	10/10
Classic Rock	8/10 stars
Collector's Guide to Heavy Metal	9/10
Kerrang!	5/5 stars
Metal Hammer (GER)	7/7
Rock Hard	9/10
Sputnikmusic	4/5 stars

Loudwire named the album at first in their list "Top 25 Power Metal Albums of All Time." The album also ranked in the list "The 10 essential power metal albums" by Metal Hammer and topped their 2019 list of "25 Greatest power metal albums".

== Track listing ==
All tracks are written by Michael Weikath, except where noted.

Side one
No.	Title	Writer(s)	Length
1.	"Invitation"		1:06
2.	"Eagle Fly Free"		5:08
3.	"You Always Walk Alone"	Michael Kiske	5:08
4.	"Rise and Fall"		4:22
5.	"Dr. Stein"		5:03
6.	"We Got the Right"	Kiske	5:07

Side two
No.	Title	Writer(s)	Length
7.	"March of Time"	Kai Hansen	5:13
8.	"I Want Out"	Hansen	4:39
9.	"Keeper of the Seven Keys"		13:37
Total length:			49:23

CD bonus track
No.	Title	Writer(s)	Length
10.	"Save Us" (CD & cassette bonus track, track 7 on North American releases)	Kai Hansen	5:15

Expanded edition bonus disc
No.	Title	Writer(s)	Length
1.	"Savage"	Kiske	3:25
2.	"Livin' Ain't No Crime"		4:42
3.	"Don't Run for Cover"	Kiske	4:45
4.	"Dr Stein" (remix)		5:05
5.	"Keeper of the Seven Keys" (remix)		13:52
Total length:			31:49

"Keeper of the Seven Keys, Parts I & II" bonus tracks
No.	Title	Writer(s)	Length
11.	"Don't Run for Cover"	Kiske	4:45
12.	"Dr. Stein" (remix)		5:05
13.	"Keeper of the Seven Keys" (remix)		13:52

- Tracks 1 and 2 also appear on the "Dr. Stein" single
- Track 3 also appears on the "I Want Out" single
- Tracks 4 and 5 also appear on the Treasure Chest compilation

== Personnel ==
=== Helloween ===
- Michael Kiske - vocals
- Kai Hansen - guitar, backing vocals
- Michael Weikath - guitar, backing vocals, cover concept
- Markus Grosskopf - bass, fretless bass on "Eagle Fly Free"
- Ingo Schwichtenberg - drums

=== Production ===
- Tommy Newton - engineer, mixing for "I Got Confused Productions"
- Tommy Hansen - engineer, mixing of "Invitation"

== Charts ==
=== Weekly ===
Chart (1988)	Peak position
Austrian Albums (Ö3 Austria)	9
Dutch Albums (Album Top 100)	26
Finnish Albums (The Official Finnish Charts)	2
German Albums (Offizielle Top 100)	5
Japanese Albums (Oricon)	27
Norwegian Albums (VG-lista)	12
Swedish Albums (Sverigetopplistan)	7
Swiss Albums (Schweizer Hitparade)	6
UK Albums (Official Charts)	24
US Billboard 200	108

=== Year-end ===
Chart (1988)	Position
European Albums (Music & Media)	99
German Albums (GfK Entertainment Charts)	65

== Certifications ==
Region	Certification	Certified units/sales
Germany (BVMI)	Gold	250,000^{^}
^{^} Shipments figures based on certification alone.
