= Keeper of the Seven Keys: Part I =

Studio album by Helloween
- Released: March 1987
- Recorded: November 1986 – January 1987
- Studios: Horus Sound Studio, Hanover, Germany
- Genre: Power metal
- Length: 36:58
- Label: Noise
- Producers: Tommy Newton, Tommy Hansen

Helloween chronology
| Walls of Jericho (1985) | Keeper of the Seven Keys: Part I (1987) | Keeper of the Seven Keys: Part II (1988) |

Singles from Keeper of the Seven Keys: Part I
- 1. "Future World" Released: 1987

Keeper of the Seven Keys: Part I is the second studio album by German power metal band Helloween, released in 1987. It marks the first appearance of vocalist Michael Kiske, and is considered the album that created the genre of European-style power metal.

== Background ==
Kai Hansen stepped away from vocal duties as he had difficulties singing and playing the guitar at the same time during the previous tour. It was an album dominated by Hansen, due to illness of co-guitarist Michael Weikath which prevented him from performing on much of the album; Weikath claims he "smoked some bad weed and there was DDT in there", making him unable to play due to tremor. "Future World" was released as a single and a music video was made for "Halloween" but with 8 minutes omitted from the song. The band originally planned to release Keeper of the Seven Keys: Part I and Part II as a double album, but their record label refused, insisting that the albums be released separately. In 1993, both albums were released as a double CD set with bonus tracks.

== Critical reception ==
Professional ratings
Review scores
| Source | Rating |
|---|---|
| AllMusic | 4.5/5 stars |
| Blabbermouth.net | 10/10 |
| Classic Rock | 8/10 stars |
| Collector's Guide to Heavy Metal | 9/10 |
| Metal Hammer (GER) | 6/7 |
| Rock Hard | 9.5/10 |
| Sputnikmusic | 4.5/5 stars |

Loudwire ranked the album at third in their list "Top 25 Power Metal Albums of All Time" and commented the album is "a tireless LP and perhaps the first genuine power metal album." ThoughtCo also named the album in their list "Essential Power Metal Albums."

== Track listing ==
All tracks are written by Kai Hansen, except where noted.

Side one
| No. | Title | Writer(s) | Length |
|---|---|---|---|
| 1. | "Initiation" | | 1:20 |
| 2. | "I'm Alive" | | 3:22 |
| 3. | "A Little Time" | Michael Kiske | 3:59 |
| 4. | "Twilight of the Gods" | | 4:29 |
| 5. | "A Tale That Wasn't Right" | Michael Weikath | 4:42 |

Side two
| No. | Title | Writer(s) | Length |
|---|---|---|---|
| 6. | "Future World" | | 4:02 |
| 7. | "Halloween" | | 13:18 |
| 8. | "Follow the Sign" | Hansen, Weikath | 1:46 |
| Total length: | | | 36:58 |

Expanded edition bonus tracks
| No. | Title | Writer(s) | Length |
|---|---|---|---|
| 9. | "Victim of Fate" (re-recorded version) | | 7:00 |
| 10. | "Starlight" (remix) | Hansen, Weikath | 4:15 |
| 11. | "A Little Time" (alternative version) | Kiske | 3:33 |
| 12. | "Halloween" (video edit) | | 5:02 |

"Keeper of the Seven Keys, Parts I & II" bonus tracks
| No. | Title | Writer(s) | Length |
|---|---|---|---|
| 13. | "Savage" | Kiske | 3:23 |
| 14. | "Livin' Ain't No Crime" | Weikath | 4:42 |

- Tracks 9, 13, and 14 also appear on "Dr. Stein" single.
- Track 10 is a remix from the Treasure Chest compilation album of a re-recorded version of a song from the Helloween EP that was featured on the "Future World" single.
- Track 11 also appears on the "Future World" single.
- Track 12 also appears on the Pumpkin Box compilation album.

== Personnel ==
=== Helloween ===
- Michael Kiske – vocals
- Kai Hansen – guitar, front cover concept, backing vocals
- Michael Weikath – guitar, backing vocals
- Markus Grosskopf – bass, backing vocals
- Ingo Schwichtenberg – drums

=== Production ===
- Tommy Newton – producer, engineer
- Tommy Hansen – co-producer, engineer, mixing, E-mu Emulator
- Edda and Uwe Karczewski – cover design
- Limb – sleeve and back cover concept

== Charts ==
| Chart (1987) | Peak position |
|---|---|
| Finnish Albums (The Official Finnish Charts) | 10 |
| German Albums (Offizielle Top 100) | 15 |
| Japanese Albums (Oricon) | 58 |
| Swedish Albums (Sverigetopplistan) | 42 |
| Swiss Albums (Schweizer Hitparade) | 18 |
| US Billboard 200 | 104 |

== Certifications ==
| Region | Certification | Certified units/sales |
|---|---|---|
| Germany (BVMI) | Gold | 250,000^{^} |
^{^} Shipments figures based on certification alone.

== Cover version ==
Russian band Arktida covered the song "I'm Alive" in a single they titled "Я живой", romanized as "Ya zhivoy". The song was also covered by Luca Turilli and included in their single for "Demonheart".
