= Markus Grosskopf =

German bassist (born 1965)

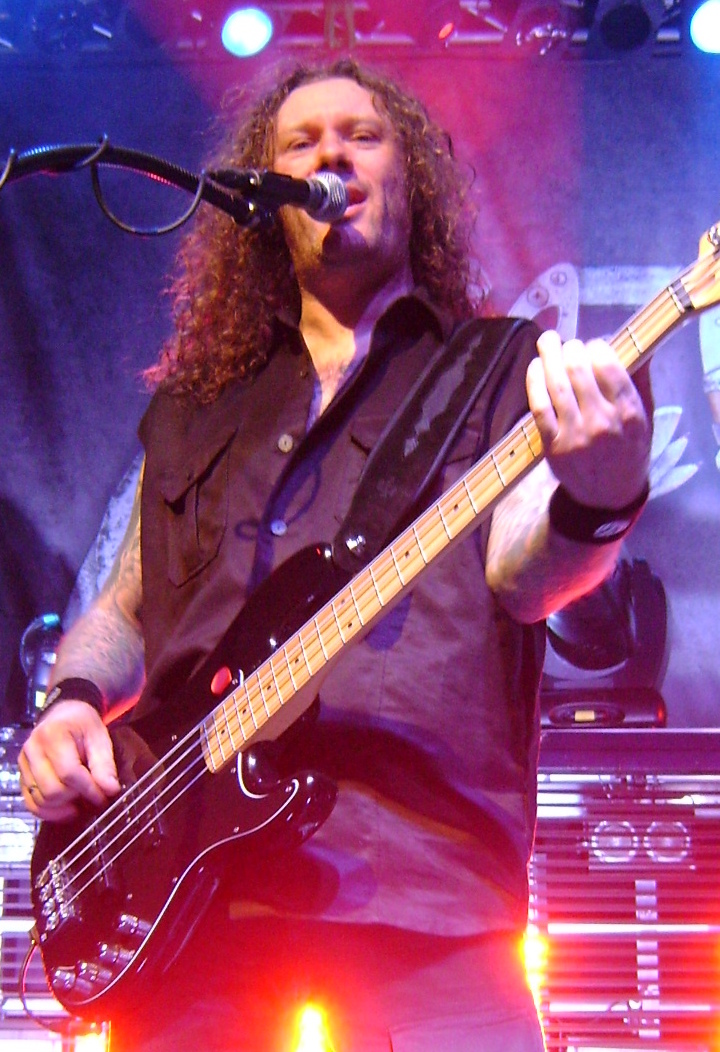
- Grosskopf performing with Helloween in 2010

Background information
- Born: 21 September 1965 (age 60); Hamburg, West Germany
- Genres: Power metal; speed metal; heavy metal
- Occupations: Musician; songwriter
- Instruments: Bass, guitar
- Years active: 1978–present
- Member of: Helloween; Bassinvaders
- Formerly of: Avantasia
- Website: helloween.org

Markus Grosskopf (born 21 September 1965) is a German musician best known as the bass guitarist, backing vocalist and a founding member of the power metal band Helloween.

== Biography ==
Grosskopf started playing bass at the age of 15 when he became friends with a drummer and a guitar player. They were looking for a bass player, so he bought his first bass and started jamming with covers of the Sex Pistols, Ramones, and the like. They covered songs from the Sex Pistols, the Ramones, Sid Vicious, XTC, The Stranglers, and others. Some time later, he decided to leave in hope of finding a heavier band with more live playing opportunities, then he met Kai Hansen and his band Second Hell, with whom he started playing. The band soon joined forces with former Powerfool guitarist Michael Weikath and adopted the name Helloween, with the original lineup being Kai Hansen (guitars/vocals), Michael Weikath (guitars), Grosskopf (bass) and Ingo Schwichtenberg (drums).

=== Helloween ===
Grosskopf writes some of the band's songs, which were initially mostly used as B-sides, but since Rabbit Don't Come Easy (which contained three songs credited to Markus), tracks written by him are regularly present on their albums.

In 2017, he and his bandmates Kai Hansen, Michael Kiske, Sascha Gerstner, Andi Deris, Michael Weikath and Dani Löble participated in the 'Pumpkins United' Reunion Tour.

== Side projects ==
Grosskopf's first side project was Shockmachine where he played both bass and rhythm guitars. They released their first album, Shockmachine, in 1998. He played bass on the first two albums of Edguy vocalist Tobias Sammet's project, Avantasia, issued in 2001 and 2002. He played on Uriah Heep members' arranged orchestral version of Salisbury released on video in 2001.

He also worked with the band Kickhunter, which released in 2002 their first album Hearts and Bones on which Markus played the roles of bassist, guitarist and producer, then again on the Little Monsters album released in 2007. His most recent endeavour is his bassguitar-focused side-project, Markus Grosskopf's Bassinvaders.

In 2016, he performed with Gotthard.

== Discography ==
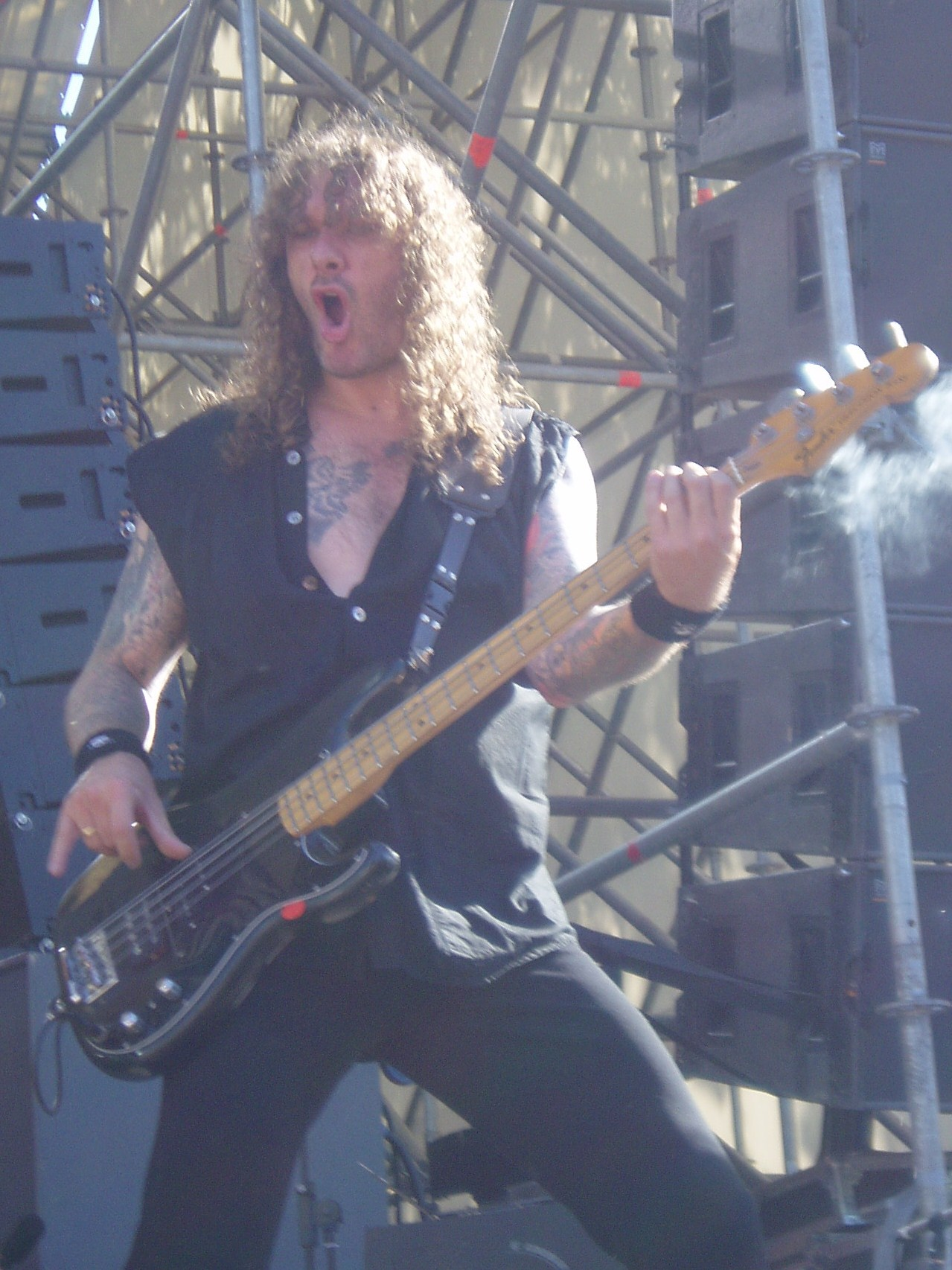
Grosskopf performing in 2006

- Helloween (1985)
- Walls of Jericho (1985)
- Keeper of the Seven Keys: Part I (1987)
- Keeper of the Seven Keys: Part II (1988)
- Pink Bubbles Go Ape (1991)
- Chameleon (1993)
- Master of the Rings (1994)
- The Time of the Oath (1996)
- Better Than Raw (1998)
- Metal Jukebox (1999)
- The Dark Ride (2000)
- Rabbit Don't Come Easy (2003)
- Keeper of the Seven Keys: The Legacy (2005)
- Gambling with the Devil (2007)
- Unarmed – Best of 25th Anniversary (2009)
- 7 Sinners (2010)
- Straight Out of Hell (2013)
- My God-Given Right (2015)
- Helloween (2021)
- Live at Budokan (2024)
- Giants & Monsters (2025)

== Playing style ==
Grosskopf's playing style has been known to include prominent basslines, and occasionally he has a solo such as in "Heavy Metal (Is the Law)" or "Eagle Fly Free", which is one of his most famous. He is known to use both his fingers and a pick, depending on the song. He regularly uses a pick for the more straightforward, simple bass lines, as in I Want Out or Just a Little Sign, and fingers for more lead-type playing, as on Eagle Fly Free or Halloween.

His playing style expanded on one of Helloween's more recent albums Keeper of the Seven Keys: The Legacy, where many more bass solos and lead parts are heard, like "Invisible Man", "Light the Universe" and even some slap bass on the first single "Mrs. God", as well as "Goin' Home" from Pink Bubbles Go Ape, where one can hear slap for the first time in Helloween's discography.

Regarding new ideas for the songs, he was quoted saying to the Metal Insider: "Sometimes I shout them into my mobile phone wherever I am at whether it be on a toilet, backstage, or somewhere else. There is a big collection of riffs and more saved up and I plan to sort all these out when I get home."

Loudwire considered him one of the best hard rock/metal bassists of all time.

=== Equipment ===
Amplifiers

- Ampeg SVT 400 Watt amplifier
- Ampeg SVT 8/10" Cabinets

Bass guitars

- Dommenget Telecaster Bass
- Fender Precision Bass
- Fender Jazz Bass
- Sandberg California Basses
- BC Rich Eagle Bass
- Warwick Streamer Bass
