= Pink Bubbles Go Ape =

Studio album by Helloween
- Released: 11 March 1991
- Recorded: 1990
- Studios: Puk Recording Studios, Gjerlev, Denmark
- Genre: Heavy metal
- Length: 44:02
- Label: EMI
- Producers: Chris Tsangarides; Helloween (track 5, 9)

Helloween chronology
Live in the U.K. (1989)	Pink Bubbles Go Ape (1991)	The Best, the Rest, the Rare (1991)

Singles from Pink Bubbles Go Ape
- 1. "Kids of the Century" Released: 16 February 1991; 2. "Number One" Released: 26 August 1992

Professional ratings
Review scores
Source	Rating
AllMusic	2/5 stars
Sputnikmusic	2/5 stars

Pink Bubbles Go Ape is the fourth studio album by German power metal band Helloween, released in 1991. It marked the departure of guitarist Kai Hansen, with Roland Grapow replacing him. It was also the band's first album released on EMI Records.

== Background ==
The album contains two singles, which are "Kids of the Century" and "Number One". "Kids of the Century" reached #56 in the United Kingdom. "Kids of the Century" single is also the first Helloween recording with a song written by bassist Markus Grosskopf: B-side "Shit and Lobster". The track "Heavy Metal Hamsters" (supposedly written about the band's former record company) was, according to Michael Weikath, never intended to be on the album, but rather on a B-side of a single.

Many disputes between the producer, bandmembers, management and the record company ensued. Weikath laid much of the blame at the feet of veteran Brit Metal producer Chris Tsangarides. Weikath said, “Straight away, I could tell things were going wrong. The show was being run by Michael and Ingo, and Chris simply didn’t like my songs. He couldn’t understand that certain cleverness they had.” Weikath wanted Tommy Hansen to produce the album.

Also, the band spent close to 400,000 pounds recording the new album. “The whole situation was bad,” Kiske said in 2017. “We spent a fortune in a studio in Denmark, but there was no inspiration.”

Storm Thorgerson designed the Pink Bubbles Go Ape’s cover and the girl on that cover is his niece. Thorgerson also directed the promo-video for "Kids of the Century". It was shot at the Rainbow Theatre in London.

Helloween had left Noise Records and turned to EMI. After the album was released, a lawsuit stopped Helloween from touring for a year. In the spring of 1992 an agreement was reached, and they could finally play on a short European Tour starting in Hamburg 30 April 1992, and in the autumn they also played some shows in Japan.

== Track listing ==
All tracks are written by Michael Kiske, except where noted.

No.	Title	Lyrics	Music	Length
1.	"Pink Bubbles Go Ape"			0:36
2.	"Kids of the Century"			3:51
3.	"Back on the Streets"		Roland Grapow	3:23
4.	"Number One"	Michael Weikath	Michael Weikath	5:13
5.	"Heavy Metal Hamsters"	Weikath • Kiske	Weikath	3:27
6.	"Goin' Home"			3:51
7.	"Someone's Crying"	Grapow	Grapow	4:18
8.	"Mankind"		Grapow	6:18
9.	"I'm Doin' Fine, Crazy Man"		Markus Grosskopf	3:39
10.	"The Chance"	Grapow	Grapow	3:47
11.	"Your Turn"			5:38
Total length:				44:02

Japanese edition bonus track
No.	Title	Lyrics	Music	Length
12.	"Shit and Lobster"	Grosskopf	Grosskopf	4:08

Expanded edition bonus tracks
No.	Title	Lyrics	Music	Length
12.	"Blue Suede Shoes" (Carl Perkins cover)	Carl Perkins	Carl Perkins	2:36
13.	"Shit and Lobster"	Grosskopf	Grosskopf	4:08
14.	"Les Hambourgeois Walkways"	Weikath	Weikath	5:45
15.	"You Run with the Pack"	Grosskopf	Grosskopf	3:54

- M - 12, 13 also appears on the single "Kids of the Century".
- M - 14, 15 also appears on the single "Number One".

== Personnel ==
Helloween

- Michael Kiske - vocals
- Michael Weikath - guitar
- Roland Grapow - guitar
- Markus Grosskopf - bass
- Ingo Schwichtenberg - drums

Additional musicians

- Keyboards – Pete Iversen, Phil Nicholas

Production

- Chris Tsangarides – production and engineering (all except "Heavy Metal Hamsters" and "I'm Doin' Fine, Crazy Man"), mixing (all tracks)
- Helloween – production on "Heavy Metal Hamsters" and "I'm Doin' Fine, Crazy Man"
- Pete Iversen – engineering (all except "Heavy Metal Hamsters" and "I'm Doin' Fine, Crazy Man")
- Lars Laversen – engineering (all except "Heavy Metal Hamsters" and "I'm Doin' Fine, Crazy Man")
- Dirk Steffens – engineering on "Heavy Metal Hamsters" and "I'm Doin' Fine, Crazy Man"
- Paul Wright – additional engineering (all except "Heavy Metal Hamsters" and "I'm Doin' Fine, Crazy Man")
- Storm Thorgerson - album cover

== Recording information ==
- Produced, engineered and mixed by Chris Tsangarides. Recorded at PUK Studios Gjerlev, Denmark.
- "Heavy Metal Hamsters", "I´m Doin´ Fine, Crazy Man", "Blue Suede Shoes" and "Shit and Lobster": Recorded at Sound House Studio, Hamburg, Germany. Produced by Helloween. Engineered by Dirk Steffens. Mixed by Chris Tsangarides.
- "Les Hambourgeois Walkways" and "You Run with the Pack": Produced and Mixed by Helloween and Dirk Steffens.

== Charts ==
Chart (1991)	Peak position
Austrian Albums (Ö3 Austria)	28
Dutch Albums (Album Top 100)	84
Finnish Albums (The Official Finnish Charts)	5
German Albums (Offizielle Top 100)	32
Japanese Albums (Oricon)	31
Norwegian Albums (VG-lista)	14
Swedish Albums (Sverigetopplistan)	14
Swiss Albums (Schweizer Hitparade)	20
UK Albums (Official Charts)	41

Chart (2021)	Peak position
UK Rock & Metal Albums (Official Charts)	29

=== Kids of the Century ===
Chart (1991)	Peak position
UK Singles (Official Charts)	56
