= Ingo Schwichtenberg =

German musician

Background information
- Also known as: Mr. Smile
- Born: 18 May 1965; Hamburg, West Germany
- Died: 8 March 1995 (aged 29) Hamburg, Germany
- Genres: Power metal, speed metal, heavy metal
- Occupation: Musician
- Instruments: Drums, percussion
- Years active: 1978–1993
- Website: ingoschwichtenberg.com

Ingo "Mr. Smile" Schwichtenberg (18 May 1965 – 8 March 1995) was a German drummer and one of the founding members of the power metal band Helloween.

== Biography ==
Helloween guitarist Roland Grapow said about Schwichtenberg in an interview 1999:

I would see him and he would go from one day to another like totally crazy, because of a nervous breakdown. He was a proud quiet guy, who was very laid back and did not talk much. He never talked about his feelings or anything and then he always had a beer in his hand. He was telling me he saw this and that and the devil, and was going totally nuts. It was really hard and it was my first experience in seeing someone like this, and when someone is changing over a period of a few months you realize there is something going on from one day to another. It was getting worse and sometimes we would think he is getting better, then suddenly he would act all crazy again ten minutes later.

We went on tour again with him and we felt insecure because we did not know what would happen with him, and we were scared something bad would happen while playing live. Sure enough we went to play a show in Hiroshima, Japan (2 October 1992) he stood up on his drum riser in the middle of a song and he then fell onto his cymbals, and we had to stop the show. That was one of his last shows, and we took him to the hospital and he was there for awhile and we had always hoped that he would get better and he would be himself again, but the problem still persisted.

The song "Step Out of Hell" from the Helloween album Chameleon is written by Roland Grapow about Schwichtenberg's problems with drug abuse.

After a six-hour telephone call with Michael Weikath, in which he explained why they had made that hard and painful decision, Ingo was asked to leave Helloween after the album Chameleon. Schwichtenberg was apparently somewhat dissatisfied with the direction of the band as well, even going as far as to refer to their song from the Chameleon album "Windmill", as "Shitmill". Michael Kiske said about the recording: "Ingo was very sick, that was the last thing he did, after he did the drumming he had a breakdown." Drummer Ritchie Abdel Nabi covered immediate commitments and played on the Chameleon Tour.

After Helloween, Schwichtenberg's father had died in February 1995, and he slid further and further into his schizophrenic episodes, culminating in his suicide on 8 March 1995 by jumping in front of an S-train in his native hometown Hamburg. He was 29 years old.

Schwichtenberg's replacement in the band was Uli Kusch. Helloween dedicated the album The Time of the Oath to him. His friend Kai Hansen had dedicated the song "Afterlife" from Gamma Ray's Land of the Free to Schwichtenberg, who had committed suicide prior to that album's release.

Michael Kiske also made a tribute to Schwichtenberg with the track "Always" from his first solo album Instant Clarity.

== Discography ==
With Helloween

- Helloween (1985) – EP
- Walls of Jericho (1985)
- Keeper of the Seven Keys: Part I (1987)
- Keeper of the Seven Keys: Part II (1988)
- Live in the U.K. (1989) – live album
- Pink Bubbles Go Ape (1991)
- Chameleon (1993)

With Doc Eisenhauer

- Alles Im Lack (1992) – drums on "Pharao"
