= Michael Kiske =

German singer (born 1968)

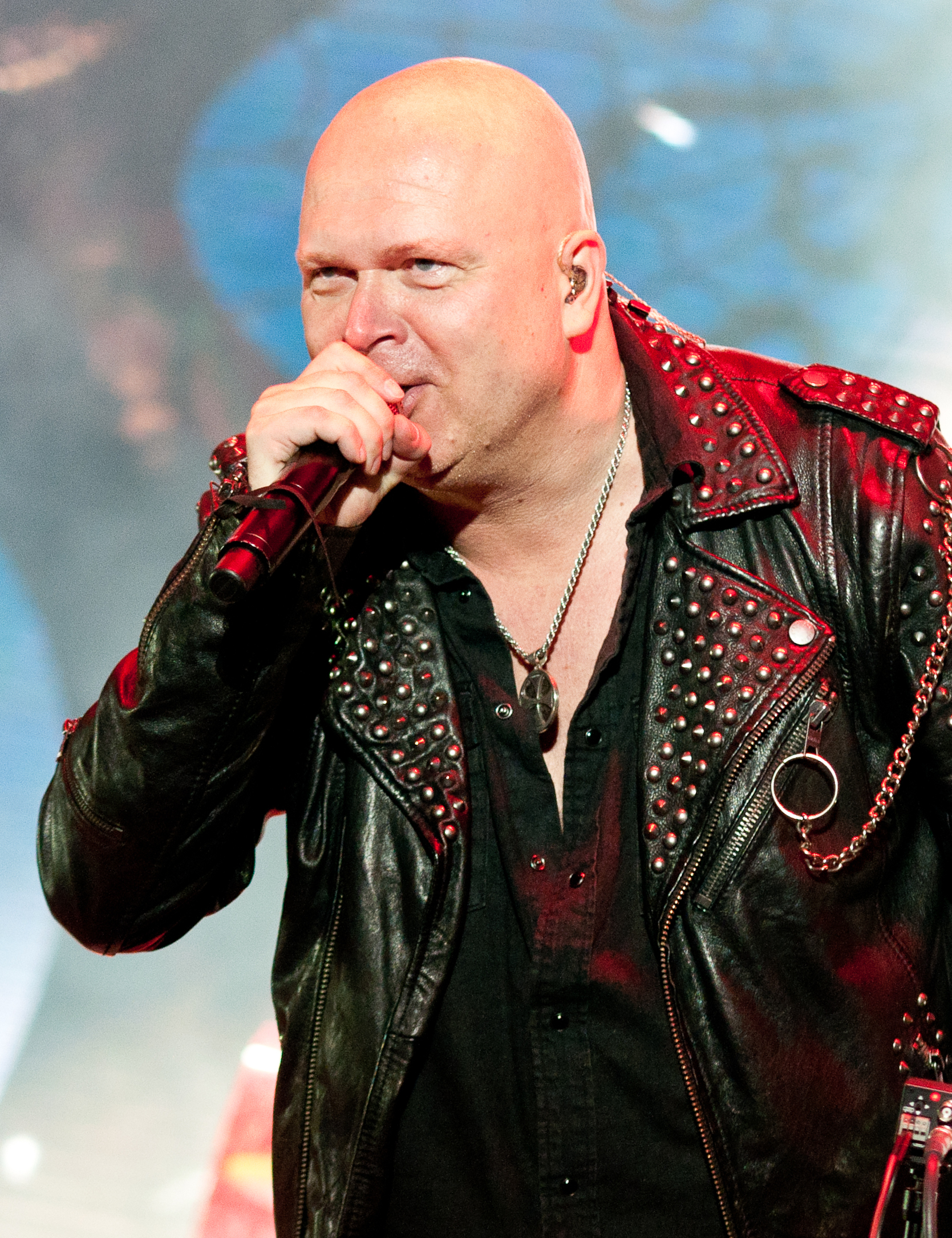
- Kiske with Helloween at Masters of Rock 2018

Background information
- Born: 24 January 1968 (age 58); Hamburg, West Germany
- Genres: Heavy metal; power metal; symphonic metal; speed metal; hard rock; acoustic
- Occupation: Singer
- Years active: 1985–present
- Member of: Helloween; Place Vendome; Kiske/Somerville
- Formerly of: SupaRed; Unisonic
- Website: michael-kiske.de

Michael Kiske (born 24 January 1968) is a German singer who is the co-lead vocalist for the power metal band Helloween. Kiske has also released four solo albums, two albums with the hard rock band Unisonic, has participated on various metal and rock related projects such as Avantasia, Place Vendome and Kiske/Somerville, and has performed with numerous bands as a guest vocalist.

== Biography ==
=== Early life ===
Prior to joining Helloween, Kiske sang with the German band Ill Prophecy at the age of 17. The band recorded a demo, but it was never released commercially.

=== Personal life ===
According to Kiske "Usually I do a lot of reading, I like to watch American Sitcoms, I like Comedy, I like Science Fiction movies. When it comes to books I'm reading a lot of serious stuff. Maybe this is the balancing. When you read serious stuff, you also need to have fun that brings you down." "I'm very sensitive and I take betrayal very, very heavy. I don't wanna sound stupid, but I think I'm a good friend. If I call someone a friend, he's my friend, and it stays that way, and I don't betray...After the split with Helloween, I kind of locked myself up and was basically just living in books for a number of years. I had some amazing years just being like spiritual. Just being, thinking, learning and trying to understand life. The musician's life is very often very superficial. Everything happens as a big party, so the years after Helloween were the total opposite of that. I didn't have much happening on the outside, everything happened on the inside."

=== Helloween (1986–1993, 2017–present) ===
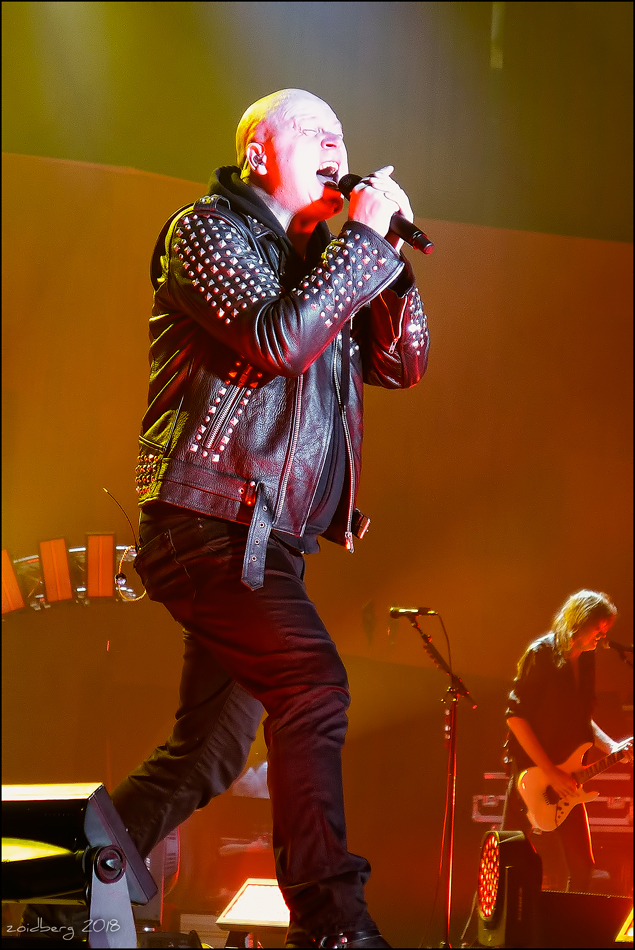
Michael Kiske live with Helloween in 2018

At the age of eighteen, Kiske was asked to join the German power metal band Helloween, which was fronted by singer/guitarist Kai Hansen. Hansen had some difficulties being both the lead guitarist and lead vocalist, and it was decided that a new vocalist would be needed. According to Kiske "I started very early as a singer, I got my school band and when I just barely got out of high school Markus from Helloween showed up in the rehearsal room telling me they were looking for a singer." Kiske rejected Helloween's first offer, because he disliked the sound of the band's Walls of Jericho album, but accepted the second and joined Helloween in late 1986. Kiske's first album with the band was 1987's Keeper of the Seven Keys: Part I, widely considered to be one of Helloween's best albums and a milestone in the creation of the power metal genre. Helloween went on to release Keeper of the Seven Keys: Part II in 1988, which went gold in Germany and brought even more success than its predecessor. The Keeper of the Seven Keys albums proved to be highly influential and aided in the formation of a new wave of European power metal bands, such as Blind Guardian, Stratovarius, HammerFall and Edguy. The album's worldwide success enabled the band to embark on an extensive world tour and perform at famous festivals such as Monsters of Rock.

After the completion of the band's 1988 headlining tour, the album Live in the UK was released, while Kai Hansen left the band and was replaced by guitarist Roland Grapow.

Legal disputes with their record company prevented Helloween from releasing new material until 1991's Pink Bubbles Go Ape, which was followed by 1993's Chameleon. These two albums saw the band moving away from their power metal roots and experimenting with different sounds. Both Pink Bubbles Go Ape and Chameleon were commercial failures and resulted in Kiske leaving Helloween. Kiske was fired from the band in 1993, reportedly for personal reasons. He was replaced by Pink Cream 69's Andi Deris, who has remained with Helloween ever since.

In 2016 it was announced that Michael Kiske would join Helloween, together with Kai Hansen, for a reunion tour that would take place during 2017 and 2018. Kiske stated in 2018 that "For a long time, this was totally impossible for me, because I was hurt and full of anger and I didn't want to have anything to do with it. For a long time I didn't want anything to do with the metal scene. It went very deep. But in the last couple of years before the reunion, without me noticing, things changed somehow, and I realized something is different when I ran into Michael Weikath. It was a festival and suddenly I was standing in front of him and he said something like, 'Michael, what have I done that you can't forgive me?', which I thought was a great line. Then I just said, 'You know what? I think I have forgiven you a long time ago.' That was just how I felt. There was no anger — I was totally relaxed." It took another year until he agreed to take part in the reunion tour, as he asserted during a 2017 interview: "We'd just played some shows in Spain with Unisonic. We were getting changed backstage, getting out of our clothes, and Kai said: 'If we don't ever do anything under the name of Helloween again, we're just idiots.' And I said: 'You know what? I'm open.'" "Helloween was the mother ship and this tour somehow sums it up to me. It is almost like a circle that gets to the starting point. I got off the band, I have been through a lot of experiences and I don't want to miss any of it, because I know how important it was to go through all this. I am not angry anymore and I can forgive and forget."

The Pumpkins United World Tour started in October 2017 in South America and continued in Europe with concerts lasting close to three hours. On 8 December 2017 the single Pumpkins United, featuring the reunited line-up, was released. The reunion tour continued throughout 2018 in Japan, Russia, Ukraine and Europe in general, North America, Canada and Latin America. The Pumpkins United World Tour was the biggest one in the band's history as it comprised 69 shows and lasted for 14 months. A live DVD/Blu-ray entitled United Alive and the live album United Alive in Madrid were released on 4 October 2019.

The band embarked on a Brazilian tour in September 2019, which started at Rockfest (São Paulo) and ended with their performance at the Rock In Rio Festival.

A new album with Kiske and Hansen was released on 18 June 2021. The self titled album reached top ten positions in several international music charts.

On December 13, 2024 Helloween released the live album, DVD/Blu-ray Live at Budokan. The album featured the recording of the band's September 16, 2023 performance at Tokyo’s Nippon Budokan during the 2022-2023 world tour.

The second album featuring the reunited line-up was released on 28 August 2025 under the title Giants & Monsters.

=== Solo work (1996–2008) ===
On 16 August 1996, three years after leaving Helloween, Kiske released his first solo album, Instant Clarity. The album featured guest appearances by Adrian Smith of Iron Maiden, Kai Hansen and Ciriaco Taraxes and contained songs in a wide variety of styles. A music video for the ballad "Always", dedicated to deceased Helloween drummer Ingo Schwichtenberg, was filmed and produced in New York City.

During the same time he also wrote a book, Kunst Und Materialismus, (in English: Art and Materialism.) which is only available in German. Kiske said in 2003: "First of all, I wrote this book for myself. First I had to collect and define myself. This was a very good personality enhancement story. I then printed a few thousand in self-publishing. It is very difficult to translate as I have quoted many quotes from thinkers from the good old days in Germany."

His second solo album, Readiness to Sacrifice, was first only released in Japan on the Victor Label in April 1999, and later reissued in Europe 2001 by Noise Records. The music on the album featured Kiske moving completely away from his heavy metal roots towards a smoother AOR sound. Kiske also sang on two symphonic orchestral songs with The Bremer Weser Quartett on strings.

Kiske stated in 2003: "After I left Helloween I was insecure about myself. The situation with Helloween created such an inner conflict inside me, that I needed those albums to rediscover myself. I was disappointed in everything and everyone. I was angry at some people, but most of all of the metal-industry."

In 2003, out of desire to make rock music again, Kiske formed a band with studio musicians, named SupaRed. They released a self-titled album in January 2003 on Noise Records. This album had a modern rock sound and a song structure, distinct from both his solo albums and the heavy metal sound of Helloween. The project was under promoted, unsuccessful and because of some personal reasons Kiske dissolved the band. "It didn't work", he said in an interview.

In 2006, Kiske released his third full-length solo album under the name of Kiske. This was his first solo album released by the Italian Frontiers Records. The album contained songs in a mellow, acoustic singer-songwriter style and was a step away from the sound of his previous solo albums. According to Kiske:"It's a healthy-careless and musically free album. I am very proud of this record because it is a true statement from myself". Instant Clarity was also reissued in 2006 with the addition of 4 newly recorded bonus tracks. Kiske sees his solo albums as "the best I could do in those days. I see those years after Helloween as a learning phase. I was learning so much...Even the process of setting up the microphones, mastering, mixing."

In 2008, Kiske released his fourth solo work, entitled Past in Different Ways. The album contained acoustic re-arrangements of his old Helloween material and one new song. According to Kiske the album "on one hand shows that I don't reject my past just because I'm a different person today, and on the other hand it can maybe give people who were part of that past a different view at those songs".

In an interview with Spanish Metal Journal, in May 2021, Kiske said that he was recording a new acoustic solo album. The album will contain new songs and various cover versions.

=== Avantasia (since 2000) ===
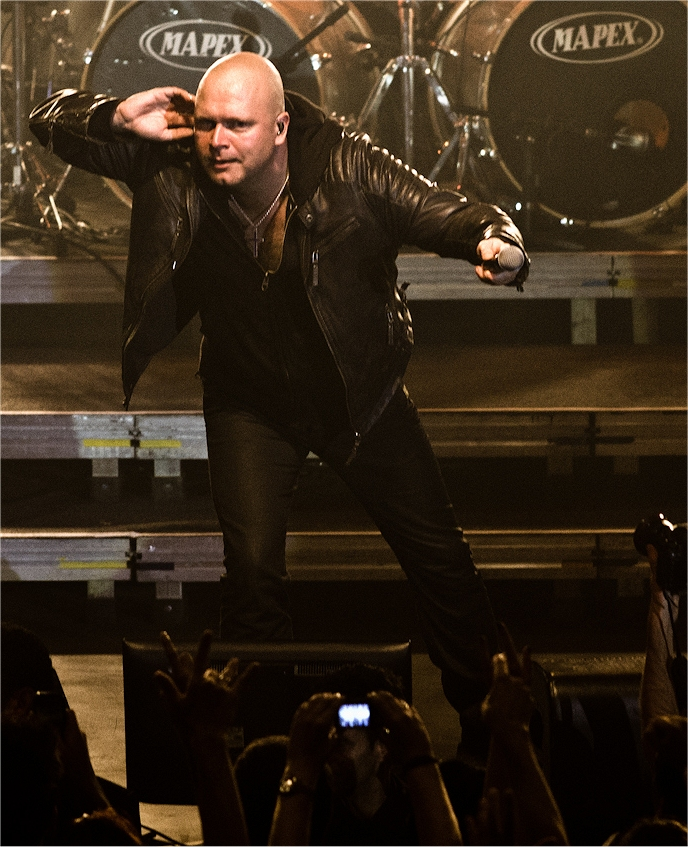
Michael Kiske live with Avantasia in 2013

In 2000, Tobias Sammet (vocalist of the band Edguy) asked Kiske to participate in the rock opera project Avantasia. Kiske agreed to sing on the project, in the role of Lugaid Vandroiy, but only under the nickname of Ernie. The nickname was printed on the back of the first Avantasia release, The Metal Opera, but not on the sequel, The Metal Opera Part II, where he was featured under his real name. As Kiske recalls "In the '90s, I didn't even think that I would ever go on stage again or anything like that. I was frustrated and disappointed, and didn't want to have anything to do with it...it started with Toby [Tobias Sammet] talking me into laying vocals down on some of his songs that sounded very Helloween-like. In the beginning I was even saying; 'no, I don't want to do stuff like that anymore'; I was very anti-everything in that direction! But he's the kind of guy that doesn't give up that easily, so he was calling me up and he was really talking me into doing it, and I did it just for him because I liked him. That's why I'm called Ernie on that record [The Metal Opera, 2001]; that was my way of dealing with everybody." He had a main role in the concept of the Metal Opera albums and performed on the songs "Reach Out for the Light", "Breaking Away", "Farewell", "Avantasia", "The Tower", "The Seven Angels" and "No Return".

During 2007, he recorded guest vocals for two Avantasia tracks; "Promised Land" and "Lost in Space [Extended Version]", both of which appeared on the Lost in Space Part I & II compilation album ("Promised Land" was also featured on the EP Lost in Space Part II).

In 2008, Kiske took part in the Avantasia album The Scarecrow, singing lead on the track "Shelter From The Rain" and backing on the title track and on "What Kind of Love".

During 2010, Kiske performed on the Avantasia albums The Wicked Symphony and Angel of Babylon, singing on the tracks "Wastelands", "Runaway Train" and "Stargazers". Between November and December, he also took part in "The Metal Opera Comes to Town Tour", sharing the stage with Tobias Sammet, Kai Hansen, Jørn Lande, Bob Catley, Amanda Somerville, Sascha Paeth, and Oliver Hartmann among others.

On 6 August 2011, Kiske performed with Avantasia at the Wacken Open Air Festival.

During 2013, Kiske took part in the Avantasia album The Mystery of Time, singing on the songs "Where Clock Hands Freeze", "Savior in the Clockwork" and "Dweller in a Dream". Between April and August, he also participated on "The Mystery World Tour", which included 10 European festival appearances and 3-hour long shows in South America, Japan, Russia and Europe.

On 2 August 2014, Michael performed with Avantasia at the Wacken Open Air festival once again.

In 2016, Kiske participated in the Avantasia album Ghostlights, singing on the songs "Ghostlights", "Unchain The Light" and on the bonus track "Wake Up To The Moon". Between March and August of the same year, he was part of the biggest Avantasia tour, entitled "Ghostlights World Tour", which consisted of more than 40 concerts in Europe, North America, South America, Canada, Japan, Russia and Scandinavia.

During 2019, Michael took part in the Avantasia album Moonglow, singing on the song "Requiem For A Dream".

In 2022, Kiske participated in the Avantasia album A Paranormal Evening with the Moonflower Society, singing on the songs "The Inmost Light" and "Arabesque".

During 2025, Michael took part in the Avantasia album Here Be Dragons, singing on the song "The Moorlands At Twilight".

=== Place Vendome (2005–2017) ===
In 2005, Kiske took part in the Place Vendome project, on Frontiers Records. According to Kiske "Place Vendome was always a project. It started with Serafino asking me if I'd like to do a record where I'm singing AOR music" Place Vendome consisted of Dennis Ward (bass and production), Kosta Zafiriou (drums) and Uwe Reitenauer (guitars) from the German band Pink Cream 69, Gunther Werno (keyboards) from the band Vanden Plas and Kiske on vocals. The project's debut album, Place Vendome, was a blend of melodic hard rock and AOR (comparable to the sound of bands such as Foreigner or Journey) and the majority of the songwriting was provided by Dennis Ward. As Kiske recalls "That was supposed to be a bit of a tribute to the 80's AOR and the songs turned out really good, especially with my voice as I don't have a typical AOR voice…I was surprised at how they turned out and how well they worked."

In 2009, the Place Vendome project released its second album entitled Streets of Fire. A video was filmed for the song "My Guardian Angel", marking Michael's visual return since 1996. The songwriting for the second album was provided by musicians Magnus Karlsson (Primal Fear), Torsti Spoof (Leverage), Ronny Milianowicz (Saint Deamon) and Robert Sall (Work of Art).

In 2013, Frontiers Records released Place Vendome's third album entitled Thunder in the Distance. The songwriters for this release were Alessandro Del Vecchio (Hardline), Timo Tolkki (ex-Stratovarius), Brett Jones, Tommy Denander (Radioactive), Magnus Karlsson (Primal Fear), Sören Kronqvist (Sunstorm), Roberto Tiranti and Andrea Cantarelli (Labyrinth). A video was filmed for the song "Talk To Me".

In 2017, the Place Vendome project released its fourth album entitled Close to the Sun. The album featured songs written by Magnus Karlsson, Alessandro Del Vecchio, Jani Liimatainen (Cain's Offering, ex-Sonata Arctica), Olaf Thorsen (Vision Divine, Labyrinth), Fabio Lione (Vision Divine, Angra, ex-Rhapsody of Fire), Simone Mularoni (DGM), Aldo Lonobile (Secret Sphere) and Mike Palace. In addition, it was the first Place Vendome album to feature guest guitar solos by Gus G (Firewind, Ozzy Osbourne), Kai Hansen (ex-Helloween, Gamma Ray, Unisonic), Mandy Meyer (Krokus, ex-Asia, Unisonic), Alfred Koffler (Pink Cream 69), Michael Klein, Magnus Karlsson and Simone Mularoni.

=== Kiske/Somerville (2009–2015) ===
In late 2009, Kiske collaborated with vocalist Amanda Somerville in a duet project, put together by Frontiers Records. The project was named Kiske/Somerville and it marked the contribution of musicians Mat Sinner, Magnus Karlsson, Sander Gommans, Martin Schmidt and Jimmy Kresic. The self-titled debut album was released on 24 September 2010. Two videos were filmed for the songs "Silence" and "If I Had A Wish", enabling most of the participants to actually meet in person.

The second Kiske/Somerville album entitled City of Heroes was released on 17 April 2015. Mat Sinner, Magnus Karlsson and Veronika Lukesova handled the instrumentation, while Jacob Hansen and Sinner were in charge of the production. Two music videos were filmed for the songs "City Of Heroes" and "Walk On Water".

=== Unisonic (2009–2017) ===
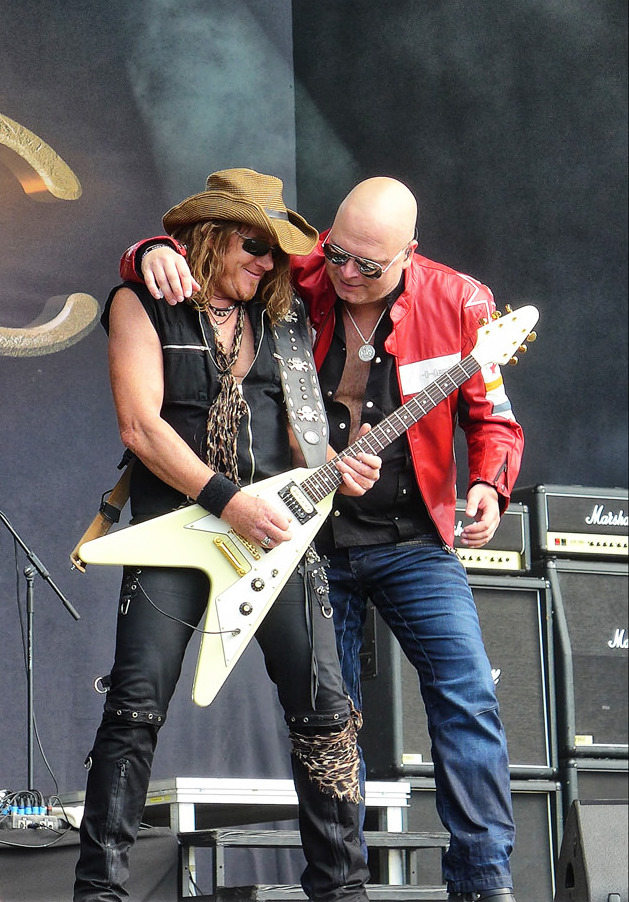
Kai Hansen (left) and Michael Kiske (right) live with Unisonic in 2016

On 10 November 2009, Michael formed the band Unisonic together with Dennis Ward, Kosta Zafiriou and Mandy Meyer. Unisonic embarked on a short tour in June 2010, playing some warm-up shows in Germany and performing at Sweden Rock Festival and Masters of Rock Festival as well. This small tour marked Kiske's return to the live stages after 17 years of absence. In March 2011, Kai Hansen joined the band, and on 15 October the new line-up performed its first show at Loud Park Festival (Japan).

Kiske stated in a 2012 interview: "We started off with the basic idea in about 2009, when Kosta and Dennis were contacting me about this idea of doing a real band. And very quickly, Dennis added Mandy Meyer to make it a four-piece band. We did two festivals in 2010, and we started to write songs and stuff…We wrote a lot of stuff, but somehow it needed this extra creative force of Kai Hansen to complete the thing, which happened c. 2010. We were on stage together with Avantasia, and toured several places in the world…We just thought that there was a great thing going on. We've always had a good relationship even after the Helloween years anyway, but we never thought of doing something together like this until we were on stage together with Avantasia. After that it didn't take long for me to suggest him to join Unisonic. From that day on, I think everything fell into place very quickly."

The band released the EP Ignition, together with their first video for the song "Unisonic" in January 2012, through EarMusic (Edel AG). The release of their self-titled debut album followed on 30 March 2012. The debut album entered several international music charts, scoring the highest points on the Finnish albums chart, Japanese Albums Chart, German Albums Chart and Swedish albums chart.

Unisonic embarked on their first world tour in May 2012 performing in South America and in various European music festivals, such as Masters of Rock, Hellfest, Rock Hard Festival and Gods of Metal among others. The second half of the tour included concerts in Japan, Taiwan, Korea, Russia, Spain and Germany.

The band's second EP, For the Kingdom, came out in May 2014, the video for the song "Exceptional" followed in July, while their second album, Light of Dawn, was released on 1 August 2014. Light of Dawn entered several international music charts, scoring the highest entries on the Finnish albums chart, German Albums Chart, Swiss albums chart, Czech albums chart and Japanese Albums Chart.

The band embarked on a summer festival tour in July 2014, performing at Masters Of Rock, Leyendas del Rock, Moscow Metal Meeting, Bang Your Head, Skogsrojet and Rock Pod Kamenom. A Japanese and European tour together with Edguy followed, while the band's final show was at the Knock Out Festival in December 2014.

On 5 August 2016, Unisonic performed a show at Wacken Open Air Festival, which was recorded and released under the title Live in Wacken on 21 July 2017.

=== Collaborations and guest appearances ===
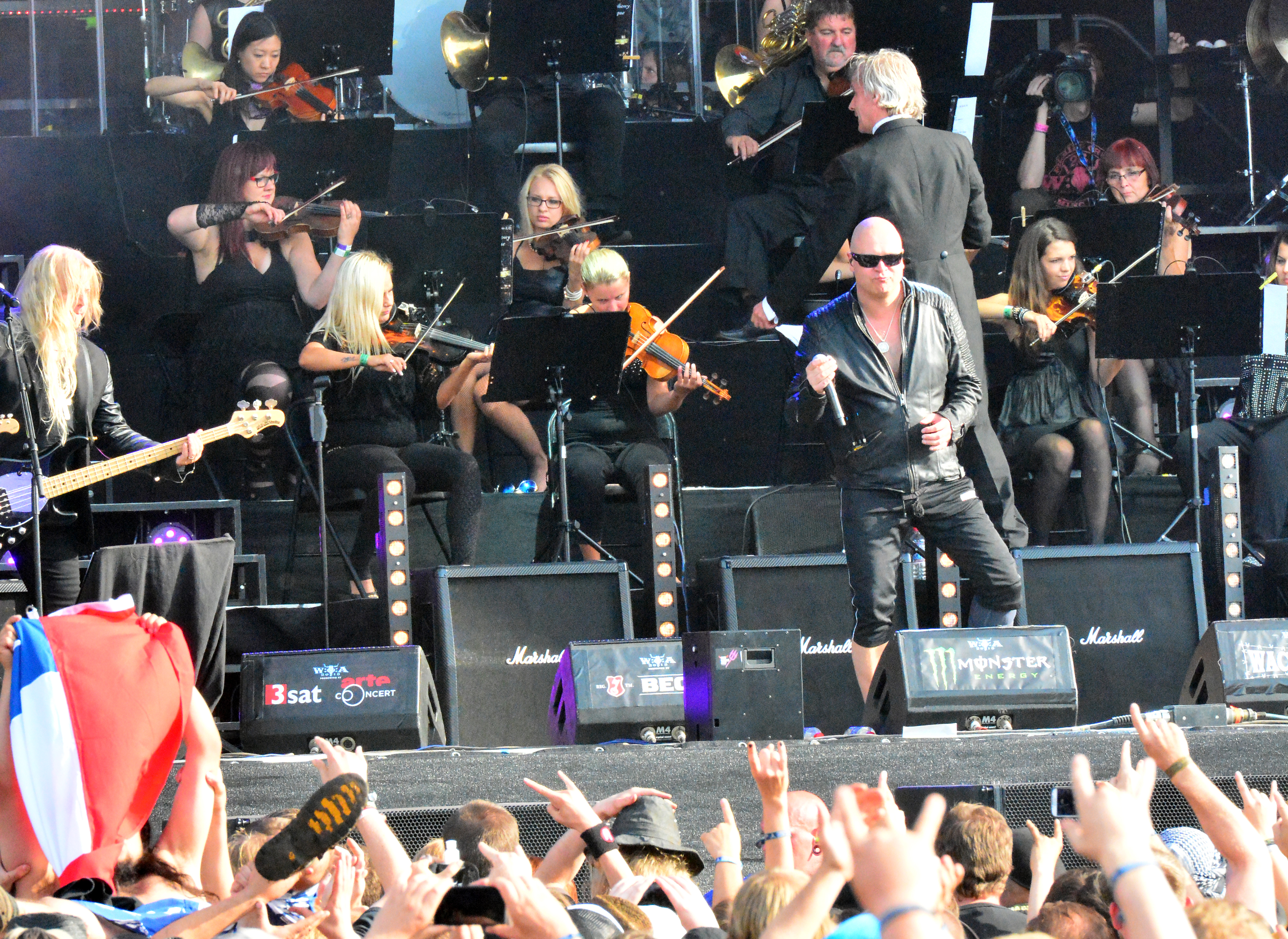
Michael Kiske live with Rock Meets Classic in 2015

In 1995, Kiske participated as a guest on Gamma Ray's (Kai Hansen's band, formed after his departure from Helloween in late 1988) Land of the Free album, singing lead vocals on the song "Time To Break Free" and additional vocals on the title track.

During 2002, Michael sang the song "Key to the Universe", which was featured on Timo Tolkki's (guitarist of the band Stratovarius) solo album Hymn to Life.

In 2003, Kiske took part in the metal opera Days of Rising Doom by Aina, in the role of the Narrator, singing on the songs "Revelations", "Silver Maiden", "Serendipity" and "Restoration". During the same year he also sang on the duet "Heroes" (together with Jørn Lande), featured on Masterplan's self-titled debut album.

In 2004, Michael sang on the duet "The Encounter", together with the female vocalist of the band Thalion on their debut album Another Sun.

During 2005, Kiske was a guest on the heavy metal album Execution by the band Tribuzy, singing on the duet "Absolution". Following this participation Kiske also sang as a guest on the song "Judas at the Opera", featured on Edguy's Superheroes EP.

In 2007, Michael sang on the duet "Breathe in Water", together with the female vocalist of the band Indigo Dying on their self-titled debut album.

During 2008, Timo Tolkki departed from Stratovarius and formed the band Revolution Renaissance. The band's debut album, New Era, was recorded by session musicians and Kiske on the role of the main singer, performing vocals for the tracks "I Did It My Way", "Angel", "Keep The Flame Alive", "Last Night on Earth" and "Revolution Renaissance".

In 2009, he was a guest on Trick or Treat's album Tin Soldiers, singing all vocals on the song "Hello Moon" and additional lead vocals on the duet "Tears Against Your Smile".

During 2010, he recorded guest vocals for the song "All You Need To Know", featured on Gamma Ray's To The Metal album.

In 2011, Kiske appeared as a special guest in Gamma Ray's concert in Pratteln (Switzerland). The full show was released in both CD and DVD under the name Skeletons & Majesties Live in 2012. Michael sings on the songs "Time To Break Free", "A While in Dreamland" and "Future World".

In 2012, Michael sang the song "The Ethereal Dream (Reprise)", featured on the album 34613 by the project Tomorrow's Outlook.

During 2013, Kiske took part in Timo Tolkki's metal opera project Avalon. Michael sang the self-titled track on the project's debut album The Land of New Hope. In the same year he also sang as a guest on the duet "Fly", featured on Infinita Symphonia's self-titled album. During December, he participated in the "Christmas Metal Symphony 2013 tour", sharing the stage with Joey Belladonna, Udo Dirkschneider, Chuck Billy, Joacim Cans, Floor Jansen and a symphonic orchestra.

In 2014, he sang on the duet "Black And White Forever", featured on Starchild's self-titled debut album.

During 2015, Kiske sang as a guest on the title track of the Wolfpakk album Rise of the Animal. In August of the same year he sang as a special guest with Rock Meets Classic (a project featuring Mat Sinner and the Bohemian Symphony Orchestra Prague) performing at the Rock of Ages Festival and at Wacken Open Air Festival. On 19 September, he performed at the Rock In Rio festival with the band Noturnall.

In 2016, he participated as a guest vocalist on the Hansen & Friends XXX : 30 Years of Metal album and on the project's performance at Wacken Open Air Festival. The live performance was recorded and released on both CD and DVD under the title Hansen & Friends Thank You Wacken, on 23 June 2017. During the same year he also sang on the duet "Halleluja" with Swedish singer Aino Löwenmark, featured on her album "Human". Kiske returned to work on this recording with ex. SupaRed-members, the guitar player Sandro Giampietro and drummer Jürgen Spiegel.

During 2018, Kiske sang on the duets "Angel Of Light" and "King Thorgan's Hymn", featured on the album Legend of Valley Doom part 2 by Marius Danielsen.

In 2022, Kiske sang on the song "A King Has Gone", featured on the album Universal by Michael Schenker Group. The song was a tribute to Ronnie James Dio and featured guest appearances by former Rainbow members Tony Carey, Bob Daisley and Bobby Rondinelli.

During 2025, Kiske sang as a guest on the song "Losing More Than You’ve Ever Had", featured on the album Balls To The Wall Reloaded by Dirkschneider. The album was a re-recording of Accept's classic album Balls to the Wall (1983) and included the participation of various rock and metal vocalists.

== Influences and singing style ==
His influences include Elvis Presley, John Farnham, Bruce Dickinson, Geoff Tate, Rob Halford and Ronnie James Dio. In comparison to Kai Hansen, Kiske had a more vibrant and clean voice. Some fans and critics have likened his singing style and range to that of Geoff Tate or a young Samson-era Bruce Dickinson, with shades of Rob Halford. He has a tenor type voice and possesses an almost 4 octave vocal range, as he is capable of reaching extremely high notes (B♭5) and low baritone notes (B1) as well. Kiske's time in Helloween has proven to be highly influential and many singers cite him as a major influence.

== Recognition and honors ==
Named favorite vocalist Rank:5. In Burrn! magazine's Readers poll (April 2012 issue).

Named best vocalist of 2012. In Burrn!'s Readers poll (April 2013 issue).

Named best all-time singer in rock and metal Rank:18. In German Metal Hammer readers poll (June 2013).

== Discography ==
=== With Helloween ===
- Keeper of the Seven Keys: Part I (1987)
- Keeper of the Seven Keys: Part II (1988)
- Live in the UK (1989; Live Album)
- Pink Bubbles Go Ape (1991)
- Chameleon (1993)
- United Alive in Madrid (2019; Live Album)
- Helloween (2021)
- Live at Budokan (2024; Live Album)
- Giants & Monsters (2025)

=== Solo albums ===
- Instant Clarity (1996)
  - Always (EP) (1996)
  - The Calling (EP Japan-only)(1996)
- Readiness to Sacrifice (1999)
- Kiske (2006)
- Past in Different Ways (2008)

=== With Avantasia ===
- Avantasia (Single) (2001), songs "Reach Out for the Light" & "Avantasia"
- The Metal Opera (2001), songs "Reach Out for the Light", "Breaking Away", "Farewell", "Avantasia" & "The Tower"
- The Metal Opera Part II (2002), songs "The Seven Angels" & "No Return"
- Lost in Space Part II (EP) (2007), song "Promised Land"
- Lost in Space Part I & II (2008), songs "Lost in Space [Extended Version]" & "Promised Land"
- The Scarecrow (2008), songs "Shelter From The Rain", "The Scarecrow" & "What Kind of Love"
- The Wicked Symphony, songs "Wastelands" & "Runaway Train"
- Angel of Babylon (2010), song "Stargazers"
- The Mystery of Time (2013), songs "Where Clock Hands Freeze", "Dweller in a Dream" & "Savior in the Clockwork"
- Ghostlights (2016), songs "Ghostlights", "Unchain The Light" & "Wake Up To The Moon" (bonus track)
- Moonglow (2019), song "Requiem For A Dream"
- A Paranormal Evening with the Moonflower Society (2022), songs "The Inmost Light" & "Arabesque"
- Here Be Dragons (2025), song "The Moorlands At Twilight"

=== With SupaRed ===
- SupaRed (2003)

=== With Place Vendome ===
- Place Vendome (2005)
- Streets of Fire (2009)
- Thunder in the Distance (2013)
- Close to the Sun (2017)

=== With Kiske/Somerville ===
- Kiske/Somerville (2010)
- City of Heroes (2015)

=== With Unisonic ===
- Ignition (2012, EP)
- Unisonic (2012)
- For the Kingdom (2014, EP)
- Light of Dawn (2014)
- Live in Wacken (2017; Live Album)

=== Guest appearances ===
Gamma Ray

- Land of the Free (1995), songs "Time To Break Free" & "Land of the Free"
- To the Metal! (2010), song "All You Need To Know"
- Skeletons & Majesties Live (2012; Live Album), songs "Time To Break Free", "A While In Dreamland" & "Future World"

Timo Tolkki

- Hymn to Life (2002), song "Key to the Universe"

Masterplan

- Masterplan (2003), song "Heroes"

Aina

- Days of Rising Doom (2003), songs "Revelations", "Silver Maiden", "Serendipity" & "Restoration"

Thalion

- Another Sun (2004), song "The Encounter"

Tribuzy

- Execution (2005), song "Absolution"

Edguy

- Superheroes (2005), song "Judas at the Opera"

Indigo Dying

- Indigo Dying (2007), song "Breathe in Water"

Revolution Renaissance

- New Era (2008), songs "I Did It My Way", "Angel", "Keep The Flame Alive", "Last Night on Earth" & "Revolution Renaissance"

Trick or Treat

- Tin Soldiers (2009), songs "Hello Moon" & "Tears Against Your Smile"

Tomorrow's Outlook

- 34613 (2012), song "The Ethereal Dream (Reprise)"

Timo Tolkki's Avalon

- The Land of New Hope (2013), song "The Land of New Hope"

Infinita Symphonia

- Infinita Symphonia (2013), song "Fly"

Starchild

- Starchild (2014), song "Black And White Forever"

Wolfpakk

- Rise of the Animal (2015), song "Rise of the Animal"

Aino Löwenmark

- Human (2016), song "Halleluja"

Hansen & Friends

- XXX : 30 Years of Metal (2016), song "Stranger In Time"
- Thank You Wacken (2017; Live Album), songs "I Want Out" & "Future World"

Marius Danielsen

- Legend of Valley Doom part 2 (2018), songs "Angel Of Light" & "King Thorgan's Hymn"

Michael Schenker Group

- Universal (2022), song "A King Has Gone"

Dirkschneider

- Balls To The Wall Reloaded (2025), song "Losing More Than You’ve Ever Had"
