= Power metal =

Subgenre of heavy metal

- Stylistic origins: Heavy metal; NWOBHM; speed metal; neoclassical metal
- Cultural origins: Europe and United States in the 1980s

Fusion genres
- Symphonic power metal

Regional scenes
- Europe; North America; South America; East Asia; Australia

Other topics
- List of power metal bands

Power metal is a subgenre of heavy metal music combining characteristics of traditional heavy metal with speed metal. It developed along two main branches: a traditional branch that emerged in the early to mid-1980s (Manowar, Warlord, Helloween) characterized by mid-to-fast tempos, heavy and epic atmospheres and anthemic choruses; and a symphonic branch that emerged in the late 1990s (Rhapsody, Nightwish) which incorporates symphonic and orchestral elements and tends toward a lighter, more uplifting sound in contrast with the heaviness and dissonance prevalent in extreme metal. Both branches tend to create a theatrical, dramatic, and emotionally "powerful" sound. It's often associated with fantasy themes, but it also encompasses social, historical and introspective subjects.

The term was first used in the mid-1980s and refers to two different but related styles: the first pioneered in North America and Europe with a harder sound similar to speed metal; and a later, more widespread and popular style based in Europe with frequent use of keyboards.

== Stylistic origins ==
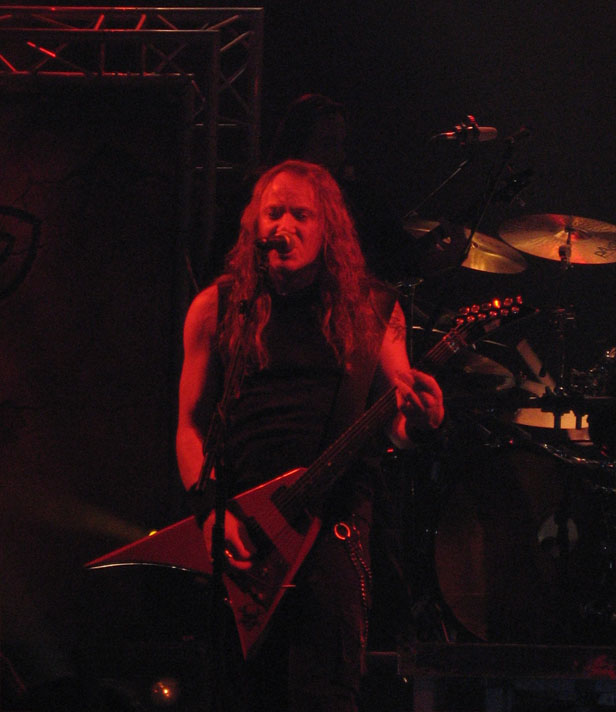
Kai Hansen of Gamma Ray during a show in Barcelona. Hansen is regarded as one of the biggest influences in the early development of power metal.

Anthropologist Sam Dunn traced the origins of power metal back to the late 1970s, when the groundwork for power metal lyrical style was laid down by Ronnie James Dio. The fantasy-oriented lyrics he wrote for Rainbow, concentrated around medieval, renaissance, folk, and science fiction themes, directly influenced modern power metal bands. According to Dunn, the songs "Stargazer" and "A Light in the Black" from the 1976 album Rising, as well as "Kill the King" and "Lady of the Lake" from the 1978 album Long Live Rock 'n' Roll, might be among the earliest examples of power metal. In his 2011 documentary series Metal Evolution, Dunn further explained how Rob Halford of Judas Priest created a blueprint for power metal vocal delivery. His almost constant high-pitched singing became one of the main characteristics of power metal. The twin-guitar sound promoted by Judas Priest's duo of K. K. Downing and Glenn Tipton also highly influenced this subgenre.

Another British band, Iron Maiden, brought epic and melodic sensibility to metal, creating anthemic, singalong music, an approach widely embraced by modern power metal musicians. Referred to as the "main prototype" of the power metal genre, Iron Maiden was heavily influenced by Heaven and Hell and Mob Rules (the first two albums of Black Sabbath's Dio-era), which would also go on to influence modern power metal.

The emergence of the early German power metal scene in particular was made possible by Scorpions and Accept. Swedish guitarist Yngwie Malmsteen made a significant impact on many future power metal guitarists, with his accurate and fast neo-classical style. His bandmate Jens Johansson modernized the keyboard sound of Deep Purple's Jon Lord, which was further incorporated into the genre. Manowar's mythological sword and sorcery lyrics influenced a number of power metal bands.

Throughout the early 1980s (especially during 1982 and 1983), the US power metal style first emerged from traditional heavy metal, the new wave of British heavy metal (NWOBHM), and thrash/speed metal backgrounds. Although the genre's precise stylistic origins are often contested, acts such as Cirith Ungol, Jag Panzer, Manilla Road, Omen, Riot, Savatage, Metal Church and Warlord are generally believed to have influenced the earliest development of the style.

More concretely, in 1987 German band Helloween released their second album, Keeper of the Seven Keys: Part I, cited by AllMusic as "a landmark recording that remains arguably the single most influential power metal album to date. Its volatile combination of power and melody would inspire an entire generation of metal bands". This release influenced a European power metal style to evolve, which proliferated throughout the globe and since the start of the 1990s is still the most commonly heard style of power metal.

== Musical characteristics ==
Power metal is today associated with fast guitar riffs and drumming, twin melodies, operatic singing, and thus "bears all the hallmarks of traditional metal." The sound is tempered by characteristics of speed metal, power metal's musical forerunner.

=== Vocals ===
Power metal is highly focused on the vocalist, with "clean" vocals being much more prevalent than the growling vocals often associated with extreme metal. Inspired by Ronnie James Dio, Bruce Dickinson, Rob Halford, Geoff Tate, and other heavy metal vocalists, power metal vocals are often in a high register, and the singer's vocal range is usually wide. The majority of the genre's vocalists sing in the tenor range and are capable of hitting very high notes, for example Timo Kotipelto of Stratovarius, Tony Kakko of Sonata Arctica, Michael Kiske of Helloween and Andre Matos (ex-Angra). There are many exceptions who sing in either baritone or bass range, like Joakim Brodén of Sabaton. Some vocalists sing in a harsh, thrash metal style, including Chris Boltendahl of Grave Digger, Kai Hansen of Gamma Ray and Helloween, Peavy Wagner of Rage, and Wintersun's Jari Mäenpää. Many power metal vocalists record multi-layered vocals, creating a choral effect.

=== Lyrical themes ===
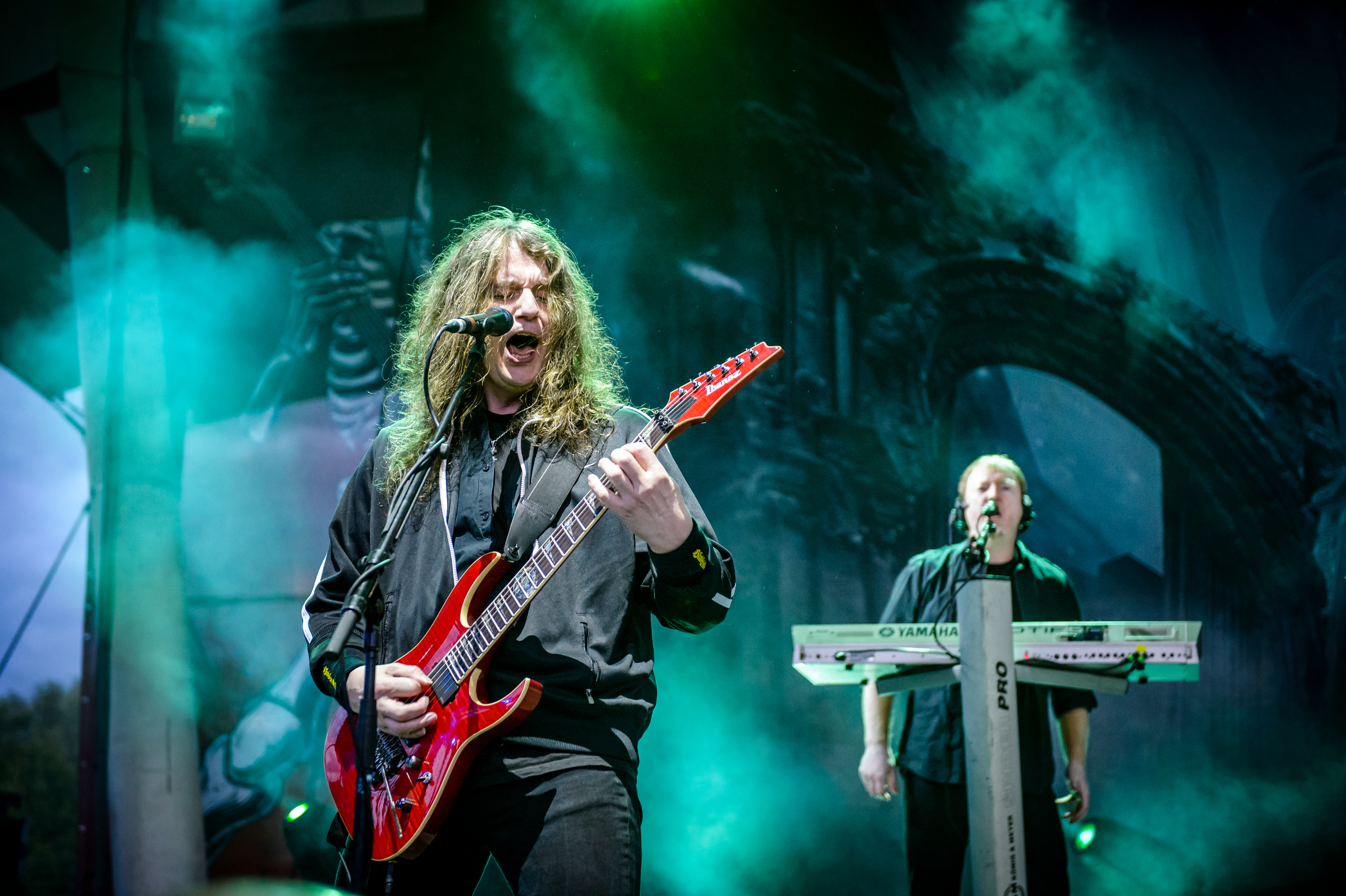
Most songs of German band Blind Guardian are based on fantasy, mythology and science fiction, and their live shows often feature fantasy decorations.

Themes that frequently feature throughout other metal subgenres, such as religion and politics, are comparatively rare in power metal - albeit not unheard of. Power metal's lyrical themes often focus on fantasy and mythology, male camaraderie and hope, personal struggles and emotions, war and death, or combinations of the aforementioned. For example, Finnish band Sonata Arctica have been known for focusing their lyrics of their songs on fantasy but also have many songs based on reality, love and relationships.

Many power metal bands based their concept albums on fantasy books and national epics; Blind Guardian based Nightfall in Middle-Earth on Tolkien's The Silmarillion, while Kamelot based Epica and The Black Halo on Goethe's Faust. Some bands have even written their own imaginary stories, like Rhapsody of Fire's Emerald Sword Saga and The Dark Secret Saga, Iced Earth's Something Wicked Saga, or Avantasia by Edguy's Tobias Sammet.

Historical themes have also seen usage in the works of bands, most famously Sabaton, whose lyrics extensively focus on historical wars, battles, and individuals that received notable recognition for their wartime accomplishments. Examples include World War I, World War II, Vikings, Samurai, and much more from around the world including the American, Swedish, and German militaries. Serenity, an Austrian (symphonic) power metal band, focuses mainly on historical figures and events, including Sir Francis Drake, Marco Polo, Galileo, Beethoven, and Napoleon.

=== Instrumentation ===
Helloween - Halloween (sample)
A brief sample of the track Halloween from Keeper of the Seven Keys: Part I, the second album of Helloween, and one of the first albums to represent the European Power Metal style.

Power metal guitarists and bassists generally play rapid streams of notes, but change chords comparatively slowly, with a harmonic tempo of once per measure or slower. Fast and technically demanding guitar solos, however, are almost guaranteed. The slow changing of chords is significant in defining power metal just as the fast rapid chord changes often define traditional thrash metal. Power metal often makes use of Major chord progressions as well as circle progressions. Some of the most influential and acclaimed power metal guitarists are Kai Hansen of Gamma Ray, Michael Weikath of Helloween, and Timo Tolkki formerly of Stratovarius. It is a common trait in power metal for the bass guitar to take a back seat, so to speak; often simply providing the chord root notes and being drowned out by the more prevalent rhythm guitars. However, some power metal bands incorporate bass that is more audible with colorful patterns distinct from the rhythm guitars, such as Helloween, Hibria, and Symphony X.

Many power metal drummers play double bass patterns with either two bass drums, or utilize a double bass pedal; using them to play a constant stream of sixteenth notes (semiquavers) with snare drum accents on the beat, a style not restricted to, but most often associated with, power metal. The style was used by drummer Ingo Schwichtenberg of Helloween, setting a blueprint for many other drummers to follow. Others, such as the drummers of Blind Guardian and Iced Earth, use a more thrash metal style of drumming with rapid bursts of double bass that involve three to six beats with the double kick.

Power metal bands often incorporate keyboards into their musical arrangements, something popularized by Jens Johansson of Stratovarius (though their prominence varies). Some power metal bands also record with symphonic elements, and as such, they utilize a full orchestra to fill the role usually played by the keyboardist.

== Styles ==
=== American style ===
Riot - Thundersteel (sample)
Music sample of Riot's "Thundersteel" from their 1988 album Thundersteel, an early example of USPM.

The American branch of power metal emerged in the early 1980s in the United States, drawing influence primarily from traditional metal and the NWOBHM. Though very close to its roots, US power metal (often abbreviated USPM) is often faster and more energetic than traditional heavy metal, with a more riff-driven approach and a relative lack of keyboard usage compared to its later European counterpart. However, it is often more melodic than thrash metal, with a greater emphasis on guitar leads. USPM is also notable for its widespread (but not universal) use of high-register operatic vocals, a trend which would continue with the rise of European power metal in the late 1980s and early 1990s. This style is not exclusive to North America, as European bands such as Sacred Steel, Majesty, and Australian band Pegazus later adopted a style inspired by USPM bands in the 1990s.

The early releases of progressive metal bands Queensrÿche and Fates Warning, such as The Warning (1984) and The Spectre Within (1985), heavily influenced a number of bands that were to develop a common sound towards the late 1980s. Among the better known representatives of the style, such as Manowar, Vicious Rumors, Virgin Steele, Riot, or Jag Panzer, a small number of bands enriched their sound with progressive and epic elements (the most obvious examples being Crimson Glory, Savatage, Sanctuary and the epic doom metal band Cirith Ungol); or even with thrash metal elements, e.g., Metal Church and Iced Earth. US power metal saw a sharp decline in popularity at the beginning of the 1990s, though the style has rebounded somewhat in the past decade, with bands such as Liege Lord or Heir Apparent reforming for live performances and many, such as Helstar and Omen, still releasing new material.

=== European style ===
Rhapsody - Wisdom of the Kings (sample)
A brief sample of the track 'Wisdom of the Kings' from Symphony of Enchanted Lands, the second album of band Rhapsody illustrates European stylings as well as aspects of symphonic power metal

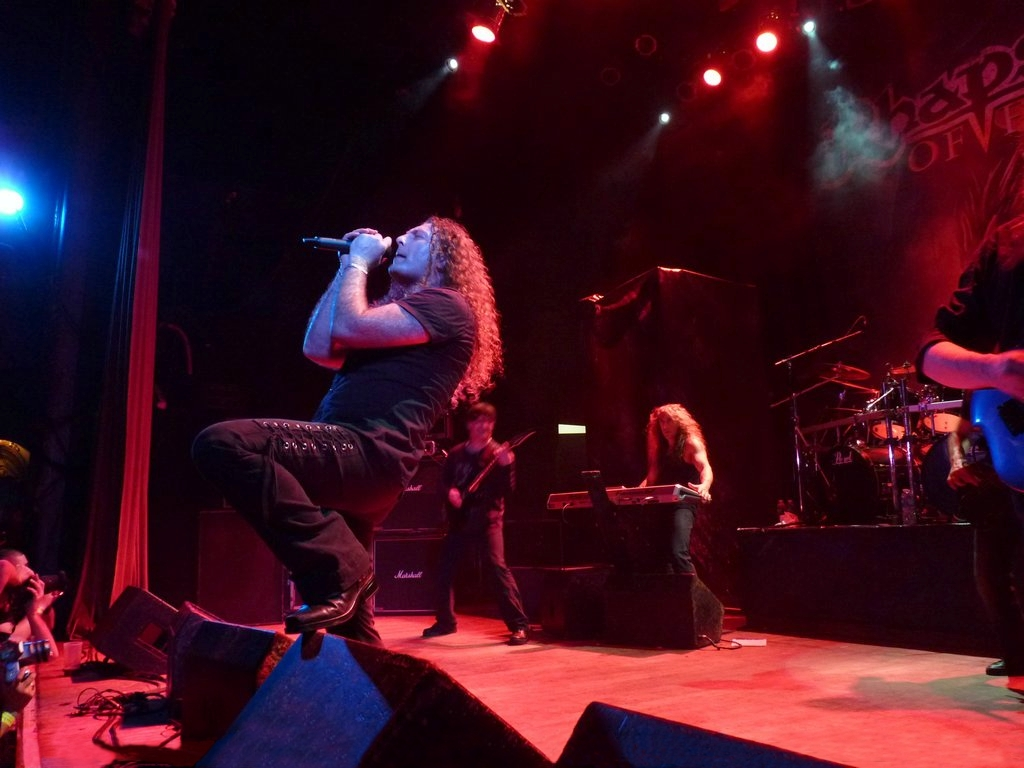
Italian band Rhapsody of Fire performing in Buenos Aires in 2010

European power metal originated from speed metal and the NWOBHM, emerging in late 1980s, particularly in Germany, with Helloween, Running Wild, Rage, Grave Digger, and Blind Guardian. The second and third Helloween albums; Keeper of the Seven Keys: Part I (1987) and Part II (1988) are usually considered the first proper European power metal albums. Alongside the early German bands came Finland's Stratovarius in late 1980s. These bands pioneered the genre, but took it in somewhat different directions. Helloween, followed by early Gamma Ray, mixed fast palm muted speed metal riffs with high-pitched clean vocals, and with a strong focus on melody and uplifting, positive themes. Stratovarius further developed this melodic direction by making heavy use of keyboards, with lyrics dealing with emotions and personal issues. Blind Guardian utilized the technique of vocal and guitar overdubbing to create an epic atmosphere, with lyrical content strongly based on fantasy novels, myths and legends. The symphonic and neo-classical elements also found their way through power metal with bands like Rhapsody of Fire (Italy), Serenity (Austria) and Nightwish (Finland). At the same time, bands such as HammerFall simplified their power metal to bring it closer to traditional heavy metal.

Over the late 90s and early 00s, power metal spread over Europe especially as well as the rest of the world, often incorporating new influences. Italy's Elvenking, Sweden's Falconer, Spain's Mägo de Oz, and Denmark's Wuthering Heights integrated elements of folk music with power metal. Angra, Kamelot, and especially Symphony X are known for combining progressive and power metal. Some bands are known for combining power metal with more aggressive musical forms; Children of Bodom were one of the earliest who combined elements of power metal and an early form of melodic death metal.

European-style power metal became widespread in comparison with US style as of the mid 1990s, with numerous North American bands such as Theocracy, Borealis, Forgotten Tales, Avian, Pharaoh, Circle II Circle, and Kamelot demonstrating the style. This European style of power metal is sometimes considered the "second wave" of power metal since its spread was in the late 1980s and especially the mid-late 1990s rather than proliferating throughout the 1980s, and the widespread influence and development of the genre that came in its tow while US "first wave" style markedly declined.

== See also ==
- List of power metal bands
- Neoclassical metal
- Symphonic metal

== General bibliography ==
- Sharpe-Young, Garry (2003). A–Z of Power Metal. Rockdetector Series. Cherry Red Books. p. 464. ISBN 978-1-901447-13-2.
- Dio, Ronnie James; Bukszpan, Daniel (2003). The Encyclopedia of Heavy Metal. Barnes & Noble Publishing. p. 300. ISBN 0-7607-4218-9.
- Kahn-Harris, Keith (2007). Extreme Metal: Music and Culture on the Edge. Rockdetector Series. Berg Publishers. p. 194. ISBN 978-1-84520-399-3.
