= Stratovarius discography =

Cataloging of published recordings by Stratovarius

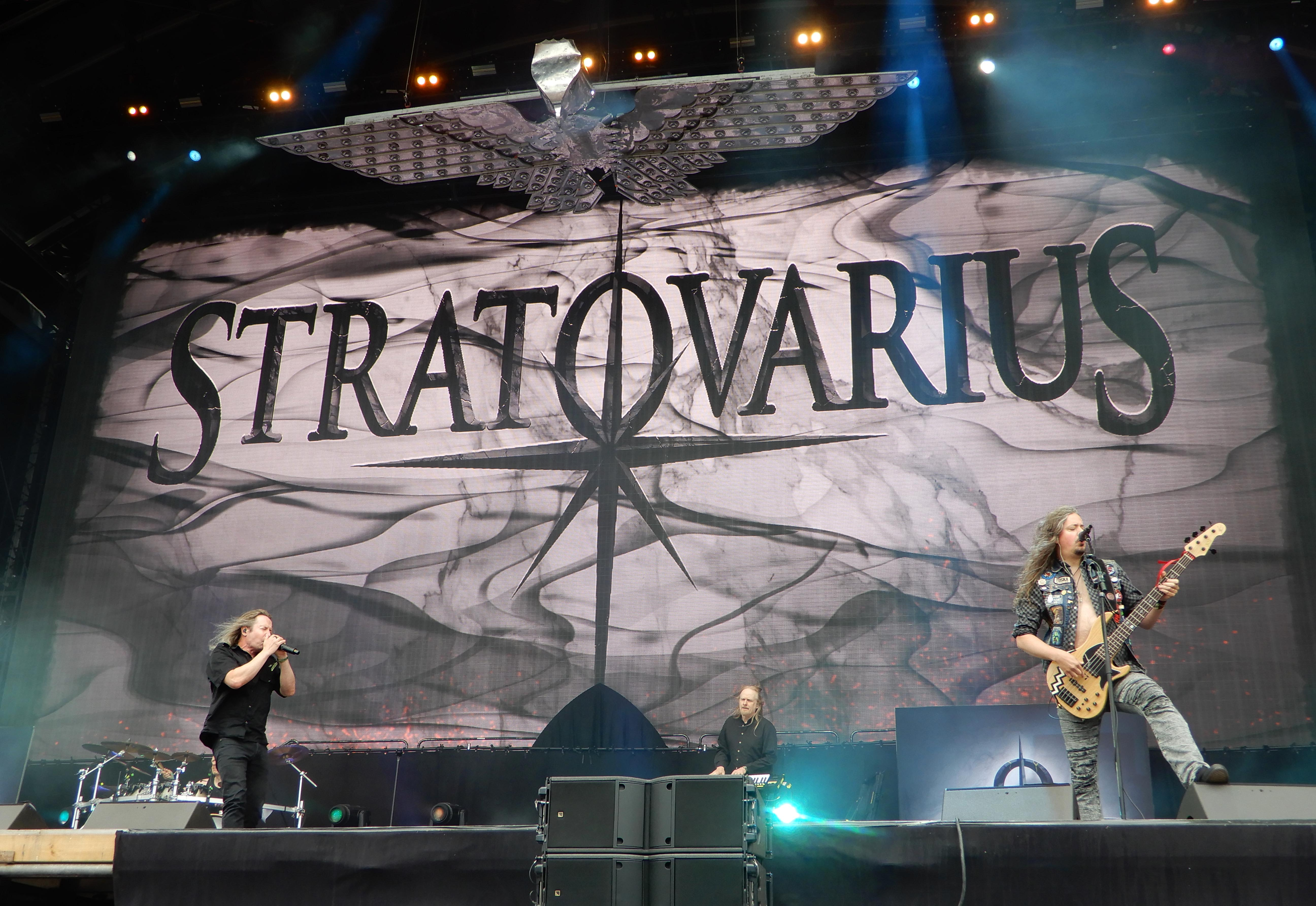
- Stratovarius at Hellfest in 2024
- Studio albums: 16
- Extended plays: 27
- Live albums: 6
- Compilation albums: 8
- Video albums: 6
- Music videos: 54

This is the comprehensive discography of Stratovarius, a power metal band from Finland. Their discography consists of 16 studio albums, six video albums, and 27 EPs. They have sold over 4 million records worldwide. The group released their debut album Fright Night in 1989 which peaked at number 48 on the Finnish Charts. They followed this up with their 1992 sophomore album Twilight Time which peaked at number 43 on the Japanese charts. Their third album Dream Space which was released in 1994 continued the success in Japan peaking at 26. The 4th album see a major change as Timo Tolkki stepped down as lead vocalist in favor of Timo Kotipelto, Fourth Dimension was then released 1995 and peaked at number 33 in Finland and 26 in Japan.

One year later in 1996 they released Episode which returned them back to the Finnish Charts peaking at 21, while also peaking at 20 in Japan. In 1997 they released Visions which peaked at number 4 on the Finnish Charts. The album quickly sold 20,000 copies and became their first album to be certified gold by the IFPI. The following year in 1998 they released their seventh album Destiny, which became the bands first album to top the Finnish charts and has since been certified gold by the IFPI.

The band then signed with Nuclear Blast Records to release Infinite in 2000. The album became their second in a row to reach No. 1 on the Finnish albums chart, it also reached the top 100 in six other countries. It became the bands 3rd straight to be certified gold in June 2013. 3 years later they released their 9th studio album Elements Pt. 1. The album reached No. 2 on the Finnish albums chart, as well as reaching the top 100 in four other countries. "Eagleheart" was released as a single, also reaching No. 2 on the Finnish singles chart. 9 months later their 10th album Elements Pt. 2 which charted at number 4 on the Finnish Charts. In 2005 they returned to Sanctuary Records to release their 11th album a self titled record. The album reached No. 4 on the Finnish albums chart as well as the top 100 in six other countries.

They then signed with Edel Music/JVC Victor records to release Polaris in 2009, this was the first album to not feature founding member Timo Tolkki. The album reached No. 2 on the Finnish charts, as well as reaching the top 70 in five other countries. Their 13th album Elysium was released in 2011 and brought the band back to No. 1 on the Finnish albums chart, as well as reaching the top 80 in five other countries. 2 years later their 14th album Nemesis was released and peaked at 3 Finnish albums chart and charted in the top 100 in 10 other countries with 6 of them being in the top 50. In 2015 their 15th album Eternal was released and reached No. 5 on the Finnish albums chart, also charting in 8 other countries. After the bands longest hiatus in between records they released their 16th and most recent album Survive which gave them their 4th record to top the Finnish albums chart. While once again charting in the top 100 in several other countries.

== Albums ==
=== Studio albums ===
List of studio albums, showing record label, release date and selected chart positions
Title	Label	Released	FIN	CH	ESP	FRA	GER	GRE	BE	JPN	SWE	AT	Ital	Certification
Fright Night	CBS Finland/ Sony Music	11 May 1989	48	-	-	-	-	-	-	-	-	-	-	
Twilight Time	Sanctuary/Noise	20 February 1992	-	-	-	-	-	-	-	43	-	-	-	
Dreamspace	Sanctuary/Noise	9 February 1994	-	-	-	-	-	-	-	26	-	-	-	
Fourth Dimension	Sanctuary/Noise	11 March 1995	33	-	-	-	-	-	-	26	-	-	-	
Episode	Sanctuary/Noise	22 April 1996	21	-	-	-	-	-	-	20	-	-	-	
Visions	Sanctuary/Noise	28 April 1997	4	-	-	-	-	-	-	18	-	-	-	IFPI: Gold
Destiny	Sanctuary/Noise	5 October 1998	1	-	-	-	89	-	-	31	-	-	-	IFPI: Gold
Infinite	Nuclear Blast	28 February 2000	1	-	-	-	28	32	-	29	-	-	-	IFPI: Gold
Elements Pt. 1	Nuclear Blast	27 January 2003	2	91	-	42	27	-	-	22	46	-	-	
Elements Pt. 2	Nuclear Blast	27 October 2003	4	-	93	74	75	-	-	38	-	-	-	
Stratovarius	Sanctuary	5 September 2005	4	92	-	88	58	-		39	37	-	52	
Polaris	Edel Music/JVC Victor	15 May 2009	2	57	-	62	55	-	-	32	-	-	47	
Elysium	Edel Music/JVC Victor	12 January 2011	1	45	-	70	38	-	80	45	-	-	-	IFPI: Platinum
Nemesis	Edel Music/JVC Victor	22 February 2013	3	30	32	82	41	-	59	17	44	62	-	IFPI: Platinum
Eternal	Edel Music/JVC Victor	11 September 2015	5	22	-	61	27	-	45	16	-	69	-	
Survive	Edel Music/JVC Victor	23 September 2022	1	6	-	125	30	-	126	7	-	63	-	

=== Compilation albums ===
Title	Label	Released	FIN	CH	FRA	GER	BE
The Past and Now	Import	24 July 1997	-	-	-	-	
The Chosen Ones	Noise	9 November 1999	7	-	-	-	
14 Diamonds - Best Of Stratovarius	JVC Japan	21 June 2000	-	-	-	-	
Intermission	Nuclear Blast	26 June 2001	7	85	91	73	
Black Diamond: The Anthology	Noise	24 April 2006	-	-	-	-	
Infinite Visions	Nuclear Blast	17 Sep 2009	-	-	-	-	
Best Of	Edel Music	20 May 2016	12	-	-	-	197
Enigma: Intermission 2	Edel Music	28 September 2018	16	69	-	-	200

=== Live albums ===
Title	Label	Released
Live! Visions of Europe	Noise	1998
Polaris Live	Edel Music	2010
Under Flaming Winter Skies – Live in Tampere	Edel Music	2012
Visions of Destiny	Edel Music	2016
Live at Wacken	Edel Music	2016
Live Under the Southern Cross – South America 2019	Edel Music	2022

=== DVD ===
Acoustic Madrid (V/H/S)	Unknown label	1998
Visions Of Destiny	Nuclear Blast	1999
Infinite Visions	Nuclear Blast	2000
Under Flaming Winter Skies (Live in Tampere - The Jörg Michael Farewell Tour)	Edel Music	2012
Nemesis Days	Edel Music	2014
Live at Loud Park Festival	Edel Music	2015

== Singles ==
Year	Title	Fin	Swiss	GER	Spa	Ital	Album
1988	“Future Shock”	-	-	-	-	-	Fright Night
1989	“Black Night”	-	-	-	-	-	Fright Night
1992	"Break the Ice"	-	-	-	-	-	Twilight Time
1992	"Lead Us into the Light"	-	-	-	-	-	Twilight Time
1995	“Against the Wind”	-	-	-	-	-	Fourth Dimension
1996	"Father Time"	-	-	-	-	-	Episode
1996	"Uncertainty”	-	-	-	-	-	Episode
1996	“Will The Sun Rise?”	-	-	-	-	-	Episode
1997	"Black Diamond"	-	-	-	-	-	Visions
1997	"The Kiss Of Judas"	-	-	-	-	-	Visions
1998	“SOS”	2	-	-	-	-	Destiny
1998	"No Turning Back"	-	-	-	-	-	Destiny
1998	“Years Go By”	-	-	-	-	-	Destiny
2000	“Hunting High and Low”	4	-	-	-	21	Infinte
2000	“Millennium”	-	-	-	-	-	Infinte
2000	“A Million Light Years Away"	14	-	-	-	-	Infinte
2000	"Celestial Dream"	-	-	-	-	-	Infinte
2003	"Eagleheart"	2	-	-	-	-	Elements Pt. 1
2003	“I Walk to My Own Song”	9	-	-	-	-	Elements Pt. 2
2005	“Maniac Dance”	4	82	93	17	-	Stratovarius
2009	"Deep Unknown"	20	-	-	-	-	Polaris
2009	"Higher We Go”	-	-	-	-	-	Polaris
2010	"Darkest Hours"	4	-	-	-	-	Elysium
2010	"Infernal Maze"	-	-	-	-	-	Elysium
2013	“Unbreakble”	-	-	-	-	-	Nemesis
2018	“Oblivion”	-	-	-	-	-	Enigma: Intermission II
2018	"Unbreakable (Orchestral Version)"	-	-	-	-	-	Enigma: Intermission II
2022	“Survive”	-	-	-	-	-	Survive
2022	"World on Fire"	-	-	-	-	-	Survive
2022	"Firefly"	-	-	-	-	-	Survive
2022	"Frozen in Time"	-	-	-	-	-	Survive
2026	“Sammumaton”	-	-	-	-	-	???????

== EPs ==
- "Future Shock" (1988)
- "Black Night" (1989)
- "Break The Ice" (1991)
- "Wings Of Tomorrow" (1994)
- "Father Time" (1996)
- "Will The Sun Rise?" (1996)
- "Black Diamond" (1997)
- "The Kiss Of Judas" (1997)
- "S.O.S." (1998)
- "Hunting High And Low" (2000)
- "It's a Mystery" (2000)
- "A Million Light Years Away" (2000)
- "Eagleheart" (2002)
- "I Walk To My Own Song" (2003)
- "Maniac Dance" (2005)
- "Deep Unknown" (2009)
- "Darkest Hours" (2010)
- "Unbreakable" (2013)
- "Unbreakable" (Orchestral Version) (2018)
- "Enigma / Act II" (2018)
- "Survive" (2022)
- "World On Fire" (2022)
- "Firefly" (2022)
- "Frozen In Time" (2022)
- "Heroes" (2024)
- "Demand" (2024)
- "Abandon" (2024)

== Music videos ==
- "Future Shock" (1988)
- "Break The Ice" (live) (1992)
- "Against The Wind" (First version) (1995)
- "Against The Wind" (Second version) (1995)
- "Distant Skies" (live) (1995)
- "Speed Of Light" (1996)
- "Black Diamond" (1997)
- "The Kiss Of Judas" (1997)
- "Hold On To Your Dream" (Unplugged) (1998)
- "S. O. S." (1998)
- "Speed Of Light (live) (1999)
- "S. O .S." (live) (1999)
- "Coming Home" (live) (1999)
- "Hunting High And Low" (2000)
- "A Million Light Years Away" (2000)
- "Freedom" (2000)
- "Eagleheart" (2003)
- "I Walk To My Own Song" (2003)
- "Maniac Dance" (2005)
- "Black Diamond" (live) (2005)
- "Phoenix" (live) (2006)
- "Deep Unknown" (2009)
- "Black Diamond" (live) (2012)
- "Halcyon Days" (2013)
- "Unbreakable" (2013)
- "If The Story Is Over" (2014)
- "Shine In The Dark" (lyric video) (2015)
- "My Eternal Dream" (2015)
- "Shine In The Dark" (2015)
- "Until The End Of Days" (2016)
- "My Eternal Dream" (live) (2017)
- "Unbreakable (Orchestral Version)" (lyric video) (2018)
- "Survive" (lyric video) (2022)
- "World On Fire" (2022)
- "Firefly" (2022)
- "Broken" (2022)
- "Speed Of Light" (live) (2022)
- "Survive" (2022)
- "Forever Free" (live) (2022)
- "Heroes" (lyric video) (2024)
- "We Hold The Key" (live) (2024)
- "Demand" (2024)
- "Falling Star" (lyric video) (2024)
- "Event Horizon" (lyric video) (2024)
- "Abandon" (lyric video) (2024)
- "Dragons" (lyric video) (2024)
- "Winter Skiest" (lyric video) (2025)
- "Millennium" (lyric video) (2026)
- "Phoenix" (lyric video) (2026)
- "Hunting High And Low" (live) (2026)
- "Under Flaming Skies" (live) (2026)
- "I Walk To My Own Song" (live) (2026)
- "Speed Of Light" (live) (2026)
