= Best Of (Stratovarius album) =

Compilation album by Stratovarius
- Released: 6 May 2016
- Genre: Power metal
- Length: 2:35:44; 3:30:34 (limited edition)
- Label: Edel AG
- Producer: Matias Kupiainen

Stratovarius chronology
Eternal (2015)	Best Of (2016)	Enigma: Intermission 2 (2018)

Best Of is a compilation album by power metal band Stratovarius, released on 6 May 2016. It has 28 different songs spanning the band's entire career, hand-picked and remastered by the band. It also includes one new track, Until the End of Days.

== Track listing ==
The album is split into two CDs. All tracks on CDs 1 and 2 were remastered in 2016, except Until the End of Days.

The limited-edition version of the album also includes a third CD with songs from the Wacken Open Air 2015 live performance.

CD1
No.	Title	Lyrics	Music	Album	Length
1.	"Until the End of Days"	Lauri Porra	Porra	Previously unreleased	3:44
2.	"My Eternal Dream"	Timo Kotipelto, Jani Liimatainen	Matias Kupiainen	Eternal	6:05
3.	"Eagleheart"	Timo Tolkki, Kotipelto	Tolkki	Elements Pt. 1	3:50
4.	"Speed of Light"	Kotipelto	Tolkki	Episode	3:06
5.	"S.O.S."	Tolkki, Kotipelto	Tolkki	Destiny	4:17
6.	"Forever Free"	Kotipelto	Tolkki	Visions	6:02
7.	"Wings of Tomorrow"	Tolkki	Tolkki	Dreamspace	5:08
8.	"No Turning Back"	Kotipelto	Tolkki	Destiny	4:22
9.	"Break the Ice"	Tuomo Lassila	Tolkki	Twilight Time	4:39
10.	"Distant Skies"	Tolkki	Tolkki	Fourth Dimension	4:10
11.	"Will the Sun Rise?"	Kotipelto	Tolkki	Episode	5:07
12.	"A Million Light Years Away"	Tolkki	Tolkki	Infinite	5:20
13.	"Under Flaming Skies"	Kotipelto	Kotipelto, Kupiainen	Elysium	3:52
14.	"Darkest Hours"	Kotipelto, Kupiainen	Kupiainen	Elysium	4:11
15.	"Winter Skies"	Jens Johansson	Johansson	Polaris	5:42
16.	"I Walk to My Own Song"	Tolkki	Tolkki	Elements Pt. 2	5:04
17.	"Maniac Dance"	Tolkki	Tolkki	Stratovarius	4:33
Total length:					1:19:12

CD2
No.	Title	Lyrics	Music	Album	Length
18.	"Halcyon Days"	Kotipelto	Kupiainen	Nemesis	5:32
19.	"Will My Soul Ever Rest in Peace?"	Tolkki	Tolkki	Intermission	4:56
20.	"Destiny"	Tolkki	Tolkki	Destiny	10:15
21.	"Paradise"	Tolkki	Tolkki	Visions	4:28
22.	"Deep Unknown"	Kotipelto	Kupiainen	Polaris	4:28
23.	"Elysium"	Kupiainen, Kotipelto	Kupiainen	Elysium	18:06
24.	"Black Diamond"	Kotipelto	Tolkki	Visions	5:41
25.	"If the Story Is Over"	Liimatainen	Liimatainen, Kotipelto	Nemesis	6:07
26.	"Unbreakable"	Kupiainen, Kotipelto	Kupiainen	Nemesis	4:38
27.	"Forever"	Tolkki	Tolkki	Episode	3:07
28.	"Shine in the Dark"	Kotipelto, Liimatainen	Kotipelto, Liimatainen	Eternal	5:06
29.	"Hunting High and Low"	Kotipelto	Tolkki	Infinite	4:08
Total length:					1:16:32

CD3 – Limited edition bonus tracks
No.	Title	Lyrics	Music	Length
30.	"Intro" (Live at Wacken 2015)	Instrumental		2:22
31.	"Black Diamond" (Live at Wacken 2015)	Tolkki	Tolkki	5:38
32.	"Eagleheart" (Live at Wacken 2015)	Tolkki	Tolkki	4:59
33.	"Against the Wind" (Live at Wacken 2015)	Tolkki, Kotipelto	Tolkki	4:19
34.	"Dragons" (Live at Wacken 2015)	Johansson	Johansson	4:15
35.	"Legions of the Twilight" (Live at Wacken 2015)	Tolkki	Tolkki	5:58
36.	"Paradise" (Live at Wacken 2015)	Tolkki	Tolkki	5:57
37.	"Shine in the Dark" (Live at Wacken 2015)	Kotipelto, Liimatainen	Kotipelto, Liimatainen	4:41
38.	"Speed of Light" (Live at Wacken 2015)	Kotipelto	Tolkki	3:42
39.	"Unbreakable" (Live at Wacken 2015)	Kupiainen, Kotipelto	Kupiainen	4:56
40.	"Hunting High and Low" (Live at Wacken 2015)	Kotipelto	Tolkki	8:03
Total length:				54:50

== Personnel ==
- Timo Kotipelto – vocals
- Matias Kupiainen – guitar, production
- Jens Johansson – keyboard
- Rolf Pilve – drums
- Lauri Porra – bass

== Charts ==
Chart (2016)	Peak position
Belgian Albums (Ultratop Wallonia)	197
Finnish Albums (Suomen virallinen lista)	12
