= Enigma: Intermission 2 =

Compilation album by Stratovarius
- Released: 28 September 2018
- Genre: Power metal
- Length: 1:15:00
- Label: Edel AG
- Producer: Matias Kupiainen

Stratovarius chronology
Best Of (2016)	Enigma: Intermission 2 (2018)	Survive (2022)

Enigma: Intermission 2 (stylized as Enigma: Intermission II) is a compilation album by power metal band Stratovarius, released on 28 September 2018 worldwide. The album has a collection of rare Stratovarius tracks spanning four of their studio albums: Polaris, Elysium, Nemesis and Eternal. It also includes three new tracks: "Enigma", "Burn Me Down" and "Oblivion", along with four orchestral versions of previous Stratovarius songs. The album is a follow-up to 2001's Intermission.

Two songs from the album were released as singles before its release: "Oblivion" on 10 August and "Unbreakable (Orchestral Version)" on 14 September 2018.

== Track listing ==
No.	Title	Lyrics	Music	Album	Length
1.	"Enigma"	Timo Kotipelto	Kotipelto, Matias Kupiainen, Jani Liimatainen	—	4:21
2.	"Hunter"	Kotipelto, Perttu Vänskä	Kupiainen	Nemesis (Limited Edition bonus track)	3:30
3.	"Hallowed"	Lauri Porra	Porra	Elysium (Collector's Edition bonus track)	5:53
4.	"Burn Me Down"	Kupiainen, Iivo Kaipainen, Ilari Kaipainen	Kupiainen, Iivo Kaipainen	—	3:43
5.	"Last Shore"	Porra	Porra	Elysium (Collector's Edition bonus track)	5:33
6.	"Kill It with Fire"	Jens Johansson	Johansson	Nemesis (Japanese bonus track)	4:52
7.	"Oblivion"	Kupiainen, Francisco Cresp	Kupiainen, Francisco Cresp	—	3:51
8.	"Second Sight"	Kotipelto	Kupiainen	Polaris (Japanese bonus track)	4:26
9.	"Fireborn"	Porra	Porra	Nemesis (Limited Edition bonus track)	4:47
10.	"Giants"	Johansson	Johansson	Eternal (Japanese bonus track)	5:28
11.	"Castaway"	Porra	Porra	Elysium (Japanese bonus track)	4:41
12.	"Old Man and the Sea"	Porra	Porra	Nemesis (limited vinyl edition bonus track)	4:16
13.	"Fantasy (Orchestral Version)"	Porra	Porra	Nemesis	4:25
14.	"Shine in the Dark (Orchestral Version)"	Kotipelto, Liimatainen	Kotipelto, Liimatainen	Eternal	4:28
15.	"Unbreakable (Orchestral Version)"	Kupiainen, Kotipelto	Kupiainen	Nemesis	4:46
16.	"Winter Skies (Orchestral Version)"	Johansson	Johansson	Polaris	6:00
Total length:					1:15:00

Tracks 1, 4 & 7 were previously unreleased and recorded in 2018. Tracks 13–16 are orchestral versions recorded in 2018.

== Personnel ==
- Timo Kotipelto – vocals
- Matias Kupiainen – guitar, production
- Jens Johansson – keyboard
- Rolf Pilve – drums
- Lauri Porra – bass
- Jörg Michael – drums on 3, 5, 8 and 11

== Charts ==
Chart (2018)	Peak position
Belgian Albums (Ultratop Wallonia)	200
Finnish Albums (Suomen virallinen lista)	16
Swiss Albums (Schweizer Hitparade)	69
