= Jörg Michael =

German drummer (born 1963)

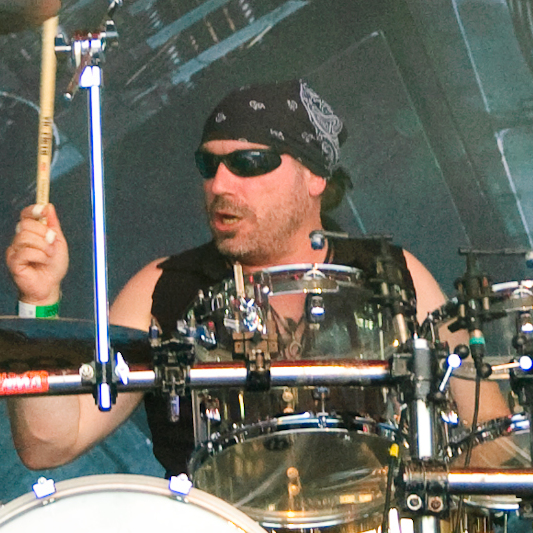
- Michael in 2009

Background information
- Born: 27 March 1963 (age 62); Dortmund, West Germany
- Genres: Power metal, thrash metal, heavy metal
- Occupations: Drummer
- Years active: 1984–present

Jörg Michael (born 27 March 1963) is a German drummer who is known for playing with numerous groups, including the power metal band Stratovarius, with whom he played from 1995 to 2011, and Saxon (2004–2005). He was a founding member of the German power metal band Rage. He has also been a member of Mekong Delta, and many more heavy metal bands.

== Biography ==
Michael left Stratovarius in 2011 for "personal reasons". Around the same time he was diagnosed with thyroid cancer, from which he later made a full recovery.

He is currently a member of Heavatar, a German power metal band founded in 2013.

Michael is considered to be one of the most important and influential power metal drummers.

== Discography ==
Avenger

- Prayers of Steel (1985)
- Depraved to Black (EP, 1985)

Rage

- Reign of Fear (1986)
- Execution Guaranteed (1987)
- 10 Years in Rage (1994)

Der Riss

- They All Do What Their Image Says (EP, 1986)

100 Names

- 100 Names (1986)

The Raymen

- Going Down to Death Valley (1986)
- The Rebel Years (best-of) (1995)

Metal Sword

- Metal Sword (1986)

Mekong Delta

- Mekong Delta (1986)
- The Music of Erich Zann (1988)
- Toccata (1989)
- The Principle of Doubt (1989)
- Dances of Death (and Other Walking Shadows) (1990)
- Classics (1993)

X-Mas Project

- X-Mas Project (1986)

Tom Angelripper

- Ein Schöner Tag (1995)

Axel Rudi Pell

- Wild Obsession (1989)
- Nasty Reputation (1991)
- Eternal Prisoner (1992)
- The Ballads (1993)
- Between the Walls (1994)
- Black Moon Pyramid (1996)
- Magic (1997)
- Oceans of Time (1998)
- The Ballads II (1999)

Laos

- Laos (1989)
- We Want It (EP, 1990)
- More than a Feeling (EP, 1993)
- Come Tomorrow (EP, 1993)

Headhunter

- Parody of Life (1990)
- A Bizarre Gardening Accident (1993)
- Rebirth (1994)
- Parasite Of Society (2008)

Schwarzarbeit

- Third Album (1990)

Grave Digger

- The Reaper (1993)
- Symphony of Death (EP, 1994)

Running Wild

- Black Hand Inn (1994)
- Masquerade (1995)
- The Rivalry (1998)

Glenmore

- For the Sake of Truth (1994)

House of Spirits

- Turn of the Tide (1994)
- Psychosphere (1999)

Unleashed Power

- Mindfailure (1997)
- Absorbed (EP, 1999)

Andreas Butler

- Achterbahn Fahrn (1995)

Stratovarius

- Episode (1996)
- Visions (1997)
- Live! Visions of Europe (1998)
- Destiny (1998)
- The Chosen Ones (1999)
- Infinite (2000)
- Intermission (2001)
- Elements Pt. 1 (2002)
- Elements Pt. 2 (2003)
- Stratovarius (2005)
- Black Diamond: The Anthology (2006)
- Polaris (2009)
- Elysium (2011)
- Enigma: Intermission 2 (2018)

Avec Avalon

- Mystic Places (1997)

Die Herzensbrecher

- Seid Glücklich Und Mehret Euch (1998)

Andy & The Traceelords

- Pussy! (1998)

Beto Vázquez Infinity

- Beto Vázquez Infinity (2001)

Saxon

- Lionheart (2004)

Kaledon

- Chapter 3: The Way of the light (2005)

Devil's Train

- Devil's Train (2012)
- Devil's Train 2 (2015)
- Ashes & Bones (2022)

Heavatar

- All My Kingdoms (2013)
- The Annihilation (2018)
