= Worlds Apart (Conquest album) =

Studio album by Conquest
- Released: September 13, 1999
- Genre: Heavy metal
- Length: 42:44
- Label: Escape Music

Conquest chronology
Worlds Apart (1999)	The Harvest (2011)

Worlds Apart is the first album by the Finnish heavy metal band Conquest, released in 1999. The album is known for featuring former Stratovarius drummer, Tuomo Lassila, and then future Nightwish bassist and male vocalist, Marko Hietala. It was recorded and mixed at Seawolf Studios by vocalist, Peter James Goodman, and guitarist, Heikki Warma in early 1999.

== Track listing ==
No.	Title	Length
1.	"Changes"	5:27
2.	"Different Worlds"	4:13
3.	"No More Crying"	4:27
4.	"Heal My Soul"	5:42
5.	"Heat of the Flame"	4:31
6.	"Down for the Count" (instrumental)	0:34
7.	"Sister Moon"	3:52
8.	"Guardian Angel"	3:34
9.	"Flesh and Blood"	4:26
10.	"As Far as the Eye Can See"	4:02
11.	"Through the Time"	1:56
Total length:		42:44

Bonus tracks
No.	Title	Length
1.	"In & Out"	3:49
2.	"Evil That Men Do" (Iron Maiden cover)	6:07
Total length:		9:56

== Credits ==
Tuomo Lassila – Drums
Heikki Warma – Guitars
Peter James Goodman – Vocals
Marko Hietala – Bass guitars, backing vocals
Pate Kivinen – Keyboards

=== Guest appearances ===
Sakari Kukko – Flutes
