= Survive (Stratovarius album) =

Studio album by Stratovarius
- Released: 23 September 2022
- Length: 58:04
- Label: Edel
- Producer: Matias Kupiainen

Stratovarius chronology
Enigma: Intermission 2 (2018)	Survive (2022)

Singles from Survive
- 1. "Survive" Released: 3 June 2022; 2. "World on Fire" Released: 1 July 2022; 3. "Firefly" Released: 5 August 2022; 4. "Frozen in Time" Released: 16 September 2022; 5. "Heroes (digital release)" Released: 26 July 2024; 6. "Demand (digital release)" Released: 30 August 2024

Survive is the sixteenth studio album by Finnish power metal band Stratovarius, released on 23 September 2022. It is the first studio album of the band in seven years.

The album reached number 1 on the Finnish Charts, while also managing to chart in several other European music charts.

== Background ==
Seven years following the bands previous studio album (Eternal), an abnormally long period for the band. This was partly due to COVID-19 pandemic. The album was produced and mixed by Matias Kupiainen. Due to pandemic-related limitations, the band could not record everything in one place — while Kotipelto's personal studio in Finland served as the main recording location, the drum tracks were laid down in Helsinki, and Jens Johansson recorded his keyboard parts separately at his studio in Sweden.

Like other albums by the band, Survive addresses the themes of the environment and the future of humanity and survival. The cover art, designed by Havancsák Gyula, also evokes the theme of ecology, depicting a human skull and garbage in a landfill. The green plant growing out of the skull is inspired by a scene from the film WALL-E, in which a shoe is seen with a plant growing out of it.

Johansson stated in an interview “There was a global pandemic, and all kinds of crazy s**t was going on… Some of the lyrics are perhaps less uplifting than they could have been, but that reflects our mood at the time.” “There’s a lot of positive stuff on there as well.”

== Critical reception ==
The album was met with critical acclaim, being viewed as a strong comeback/return to form. Blabbermouth.net gave the album a positive review stating “All of Stratovarius most classic traits are as integral to "Survive" as they were to any previous album, but here fresh inspiration has led to new and vivid colors being woven into that enduring blueprint.” Adding “this is the sound of Finland's power metal masters at their classy, clangorous best.”

Jakk Mylde of Metal Sucks stated gave the album a near perfect score claiming “With their latest effort, they (Stratovarius) have set out and proved something that we already knew; Stratovarius are a band built to thrive, not just survive.”

Metal Hammer put Survive at number 7 on their list of “The 10 best power metal albums of 2022.”

Survive was nominated for metal album of the year at the 2022 Emma gaalas.

Professional ratings
Review scores
Source	Rating
MetalSucks	4.5/5 stars
Metal Injection	7.5/10
Blabbermouth.net	8.5/10
Sonic Perspectives	8.8/10
My Global Mind	9/10

== Track listing ==
All lyrics are written by Jens Johansson, Timo Kotipelto, Matias Kupiainen, Jani Liimatainen, except where noted.

No.	Title	Lyrics	Music	Length
1.	"Survive"		Kupiainen	4:39
2.	"Demand"		Kotipelto, Kupiainen	4:03
3.	"Broken"	Johansson, Kotipelto, Kupiainen	Kupiainen	4:58
4.	"Firefly"		Johansson, Kotipelto, Kupiainen	3:39
5.	"We Are Not Alone"	Kotipelto, Kupiainen, Liimatainen	Kupiainen, Lauri Porra	4:35
6.	"Frozen in Time"	Johansson, Kotipelto, Liimatainen	Johansson, Kotipelto, Kupiainen	6:43
7.	"World on Fire"		Francisco Cresp, Kupiainen	4:26
8.	"Glory Days"		Johansson, Kotipelto, Kupiainen	5:07
9.	"Breakaway"		Kotipelto, Kupiainen	4:28
10.	"Before the Fall"	Johansson, Kotipelto, Liimatainen	Kotipelto, Kupiainen	4:16
11.	"Voice of Thunder"	Johansson, Kotipelto, Liimatainen	Johansson, Kotipelto, Kupiainen	11:11
Total length:				58:04

Exclusive track for vinyl edition
No.	Title	Lyrics	Music	Length
10.	"Heroes"	Kupiainen	Kupiainen	3:48

== Personnel ==
- Timo Kotipelto – vocals
- Matias Kupiainen – guitar, production
- Jens Johansson – keyboard
- Rolf Pilve – drums
- Lauri Porra – bass

== Charts ==
Chart (2022)	Peak position
Austrian Albums (Ö3 Austria)	63
Belgian Albums (Ultratop Flanders)	179
Belgian Albums (Ultratop Wallonia)	126
Finnish Albums (Suomen virallinen lista)	1
French Albums (SNEP)	125
German Albums (Offizielle Top 100)	30
Japanese Albums (Oricon)	32
Scottish Albums (Official Charts)	64
Swiss Albums (Schweizer Hitparade)	6
UK Independent Albums (Official Charts)	25
UK Rock & Metal Albums (Official Charts)	5
