= Polaris (Stratovarius album) =

Studio album by Stratovarius
- Released: 15 May 2009
- Recorded: September–December 2008 at Finnvox Studios, Hästfittan Studios and 5 by 5 Audio in Pitäjänmäki; Musicworks; Timo Kotipelto's home; Der Bunker
- Genre: Power metal; neoclassical metal; symphonic metal
- Length: 54:55
- Label: Edel
- Producer: Stratovarius

Stratovarius chronology
Stratovarius (2005)	Polaris (2009)	Elysium (2011)

Alternative cover
- Vinyl edition

Singles from Polaris
- 1. "Deep Unknown" / "Higher We Go" Released: 29 April 2009

Professional ratings
Review scores
Source	Rating
AllMusic	3.5/5 stars
Metalcrypt.com	4/5 stars

Polaris is the twelfth studio album by power metal band Stratovarius, released on 15 May 2009. It is the first Stratovarius album to feature bassist Lauri Porra and guitarist Matias Kupiainen, following former bassist Jari Kainulainen's departure from the band in 2005 and former guitarist Timo Tolkki's departure in 2008.

Timo Kotipelto, who at the time of Polaris' release had been a member of Stratovarius the longest (since 1994) among the current members, considered Polaris to be "the album that saved the band" and said that "without it there would not be any Stratovarius." More time passed between the release of Stratovarius' eponymous album Stratovarius in 2005 and the release of Polaris than between any other two consecutive albums released by the band. Stratovarius in 2006 had recorded a demo album called Revolution Renaissance, performed one Revolution Renaissance song live in August 2007 ("Last Night on Earth") and according to Kotipelto had intended to release a completed version of the album in 2008. However, the songs of that album were re-recorded and released in 2008 as New Era, the first album of Tolkki's new band, Revolution Renaissance, which acquired the album's prior name.

Polaris reached No. 2 on the Finnish albums chart, as well as reaching the top 70 in five other countries. "Deep Unknown" was released as a single, reaching No. 20 on the Finnish singles chart. In its first week of release, the album sold around 800 copies in the U.S.

== Background ==
In September 2008, with past tensions behind them, the band withdrew to a secluded cabin near the Finnish coastline for several weeks. There, surrounded by forest and sea, they focused on reconnecting as a group — spending time together, and began writing, creating, and recording new material. The experience revitalized them, leading to a renewed sense of purpose and resulting in an album that was melodic, dynamic, polished, and musically intricate.

== Reception ==
Greg Prato writing for AllMusic stated “The signature Stratovarius sound and approach are very much still intact, as evidenced by their 12th studio album overall, Polaris.” Also commenting on the “bombastic production, and all the elements that longtime Stratovarius connoisseurs demand in a new album by their Finnish heroes.” Blabbermouth.net gave the album a positive review commenting on the “Powerful melodies mingle with sophisticated arrangements, strong anthems stand alongside heavy songs. 11 songs full of energy, musicianship, and a positive outlook.

== Track listing ==
No.	Title	Lyrics	Music	Length
1.	"Deep Unknown"	Timo Kotipelto	Matias Kupiainen	4:28
2.	"Falling Star"	Lauri Porra	Porra	4:33
3.	"King of Nothing"	Jens Johansson	Johansson	6:43
4.	"Blind"	Johansson	Johansson	5:28
5.	"Winter Skies"	Johansson	Johansson	5:50
6.	"Forever Is Today"	Porra	Porra	4:40
7.	"Higher We Go"	Kotipelto	Kotipelto, Kupiainen	3:47
8.	"Somehow Precious"	Kotipelto	Kotipelto, Kupiainen	5:37
9.	"Emancipation Suite Part I: Dusk"	Porra	Porra	6:57
10.	"Emancipation Suite Part II: Dawn"	Porra	Porra	3:40
11.	"When Mountains Fall"	Porra	Porra	3:12
Total length:				54:55

Digipak edition bonus track
No.	Title	Lyrics	Music	Length
12.	"Deep Unknown (Mikko Raita Vinyl Mix)"	Kotipelto	Kupiainen	4:46

Japanese edition
No.	Title	Writer(s)	Length
1.	"Deep Unknown"	Kotipelto, Kupiainen	4:28
2.	"Falling Star"	Porra	4:33
3.	"King of Nothing"	Johansson	6:43
4.	"Second Sight"	Kotipelto, Kupiainen	4:25
5.	"Blind"	Johansson	5:28
6.	"Winter Skies"	Johansson	5:50
7.	"Forever Is Today"	Porra	4:40
8.	"Higher We Go"	Kotipelto, Kupiainen	3:47
9.	"Somehow Precious"	Kotipelto, Kupiainen	5:37
10.	"Emancipation Suite Part I: Dusk"	Porra	6:57
11.	"Emancipation Suite Part II: Dawn"	Porra	3:40
12.	"When Mountains Fall"	Porra	3:12

7" vinyl collector's edition
No.	Title	Writer(s)	Length
1.	"Second Sight (Mikko Karmilla Polycarbonate Mix)"	Kotipelto, Kupiainen
2.	"King Of Nothing (Matias Kupiainen Death Star Mix)"	Johansson

Digipak edition reissue live bonus disc
No.	Title	Lyrics	Music	Length
1.	"Destiny"	Timo Tolkki	Tolkki	10:12
2.	"Hunting High and Low"	Kotipelto	Tolkki	5:07
3.	"Speed of Light"	Kotipelto	Tolkki	3:14
4.	"The Kiss of Judas"	Kotipelto	Tolkki	6:54
5.	"Deep Unknown"	Kotipelto	Kupiainen	5:08
6.	"A Million Light Years Away"	Tolkki	Tolkki	5:33
7.	"Bach: Air Suite"	(instrumental)	Johann Sebastian Bach	2:17
8.	"Winter Skies"	Johansson	Johansson	5:19
9.	"Phoenix"	Tolkki	Tolkki	6:08
10.	"SOS"	Tolkki, Kotipelto	Tolkki	3:55
11.	"Forever is Today"	Porra	Porra	5:15
12.	"King of Nothing"	Johansson	Johansson	6:39
13.	"Father Time"	Kotipelto, Richard Johnson	Tolkki	5:19
14.	"Higher We Go"	Kotipelto	Kotipelto, Kupiainen	4:07
Total length:				75:07

== Personnel ==
=== Stratovarius ===
- Timo Kotipelto – lead vocals, background vocals, production
- Matias Kupiainen – guitar, background vocals, engineering (vocals, guitar, bass), production
- Jens Johansson – keyboard, background vocals, engineering, production
- Jörg Michael – drums, production
- Lauri Porra – bass, background vocals, production

=== Additional credits ===
- Seppo Rautasuo – strings (track 11)
- Heikki Hämäläinen – strings (track 11)
- Heikki Vehmanen – strings (track 11)
- Kari Lindstedt – strings (track 11)
- Perttu Vänskä – strings arrangement (tracks 1, 8), strings programming (tracks 1, 8), engineering (acoustic guitar; track 11), additional Pro Tools editing
- Pessi Levanto – strings arrangement (track 11)
- Alexi Parviainen – background vocals
- Marko Waara – background vocals
- Tipe Johnson – background vocals
- Tony Kakko – background vocals
- Tommi Vainikainen – engineering (strings; track 11)
- Mikko Karmila – mixing
- Mikko Raita – mixing (track 11)
- Svante Forsbäck – mastering

== Release history ==
Following Polaris' original release, a Digipak edition was reissued on 21 May 2010, containing a bonus disc of live recordings from the 2009–10 Polaris world tour.

Region	Date	Label
Europe	15 May 2009	Edel
Japan	15 May 2009	Victor
United States	15 May 2009	Armoury
Europe (reissue)	21 May 2010	Edel

== Charts ==
Chart (2009)	Peak position
Finnish Albums (Suomen virallinen lista)	2
French Albums (SNEP)	62
German Albums (Offizielle Top 100)	55
Hungarian Albums (MAHASZ)	32
Italian Albums (FIMI)	47
Japanese Albums (Oricon)	32
Swiss Albums (Schweizer Hitparade)	57
US Heatseekers Albums (Billboard)	57
