= Matias Kupiainen =

Finnish guitarist, songwriter, and record producer (born 1983)

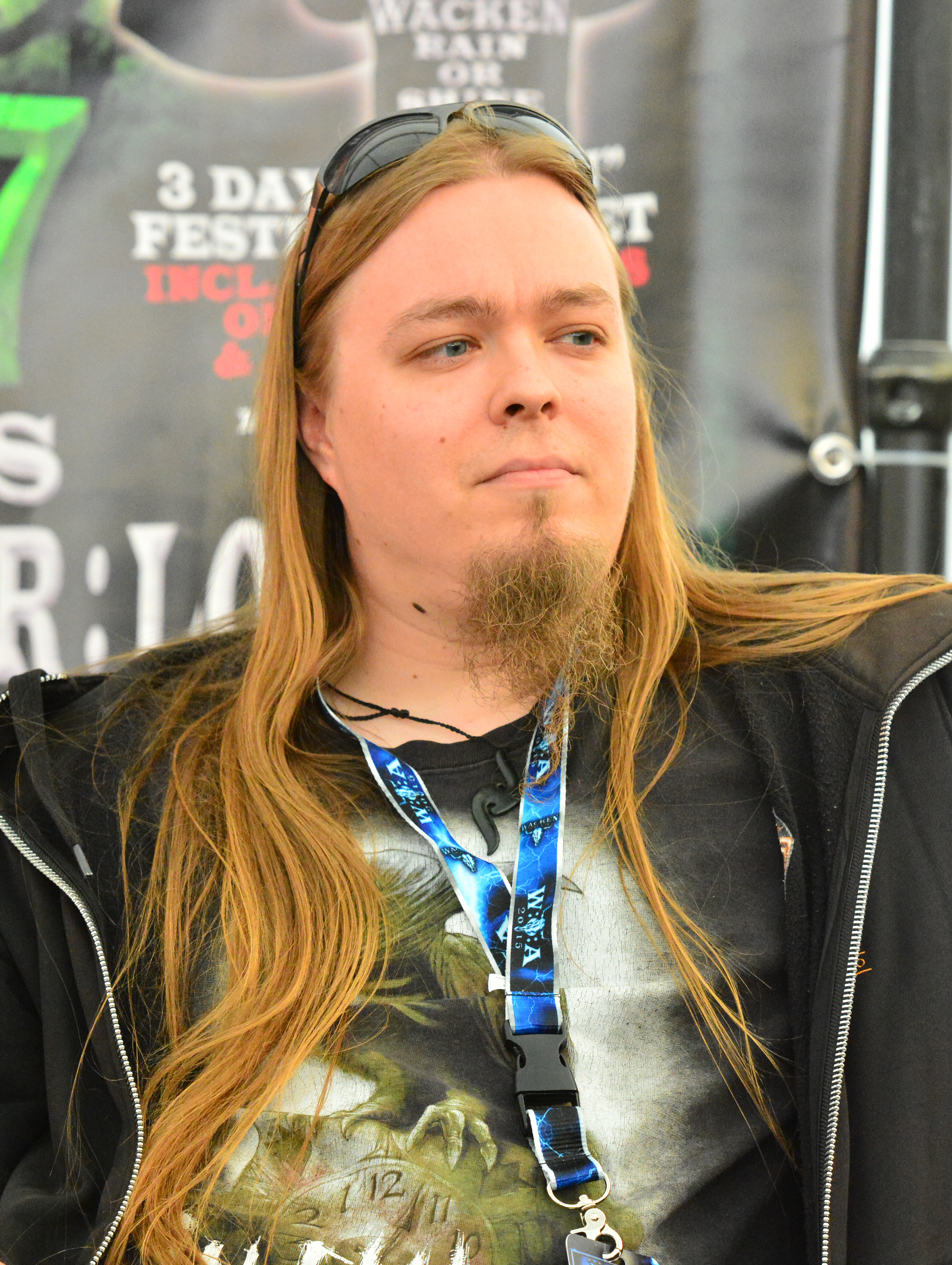
- Matias Kupiainen at Wacken Open Air 2016

Background information
- Born: 11 May 1983 (age 43); Helsinki, Finland
- Genres: Power metal; neoclassical metal; progressive metal; jazz fusion; grindcore
- Occupations: Musician; songwriter; record producer
- Instrument: Guitar
- Years active: 2006–present
- Labels: Ear Music, Victor
- Website: ,

Matias Kupiainen (born 11 May 1983 in Helsinki) is a Finnish guitarist, songwriter and record producer. He is the current guitarist in Stratovarius.

== Biography ==
Kupiainen was chosen as the new guitarist for the Finnish power metal band Stratovarius after Timo Tolkki's departure from the band in 2008. He started playing with the band in 2009, on their album Polaris for which he composed three songs.

In addition to Stratovarius, Kupiainen founded the grindcore band Fist in Fetus, which released a self-produced EP in 2007. He guested on the 2007 album Guitar Heroes, on the song "12 Donkeys", that was also released as a single, and appeared on the record release concert at Tavastia Club. At the 2007 Tuska festival, he appeared as the one-man house band of the TV station YLE Extra.

Kupiainen has also played as a session musician, among others, on albums of Olavi Uusivirta and Milana Misic, and worked as a producer, recording engineer, and mixer, as well. He has studied at Sibelius Academy in Helsinki and the Pop & Jazz Conservatory in Oulunkylä. He played a PRS Artist Series I guitar and now he is an endorser of Ruokangas Guitars. He currently plays his custom Hellcat made of Spanish cedar and arctic birch, and uses mainly ENGL, Hughes & Kettner, Mesa Boogie and TC Electronic gear.

Kupiainen was a part-owner of a recording studio named Minor Music in Helsinki, Finland, until it was merged with 5 By 5 Audio.

== Discography ==
=== Fist in Fetus ===
- 2007 Fist in Fetus EP

=== Stratovarius ===
- 2009 Polaris
- 2010 Polaris Live
- 2011 Elysium
- 2012 Under Flaming Winter Skies: Live in Tampere
- 2013 Nemesis
- 2014 Nemesis Days
- 2015 Eternal
- 2016 Best Of
- 2018 Enigma: Intermission 2
- 2022 Survive

=== Guest appearances ===
- 2011 Turisas, Stand Up and Fight

=== Offensive ===
- 2021 Awenasa
