= Elysium (Stratovarius album) =

Studio album by Stratovarius
- Released: 12 January 2011
- Recorded: 2010 at 5 by 5 Audio in Pitäjänmäki
- Genre: Power metal; neoclassical metal; symphonic metal
- Length: 56:29
- Label: Victor
- Producer: Matias Kupiainen

Stratovarius chronology
Polaris (2009)	Elysium (2011)	Nemesis (2013)

Alternative cover
- Collector's edition

Singles from Elysium
- 1. "Darkest Hours" / "Infernal Maze" Released: 26 November 2010

Elysium is the thirteenth studio album by power metal band Stratovarius, released on 12 January 2011 through Victor Entertainment (Japan) and on 14 January through Edel AG (worldwide). It is the last Stratovarius album to feature longtime drummer Jörg Michael, who left the band in 2012. Elysium reached No. 1 on the Finnish albums chart, as well as reaching the top 80 in five other countries. "Darkest Hours" was released as a single, reaching No. 4 on the Finnish singles chart.

== Overview ==
The official track listing for Elysium was first announced by keyboardist Jens Johansson on the forum of the band's website on 8 November 2010. The album was released on four different formats: a regular CD; a deluxe Digipak edition CD with a bonus disc containing demos of the entire album; a double-disc collector's edition CD with two bonus tracks on a 7" single; and on vinyl. At a length of 18:07, Elysium's title track is by far the longest Stratovarius song to date. The album cover art was created by Gyula Havancsák and features the same star-shaped spacecraft from Polaris (2009).

== Critical reception ==
The album was met with positive reviews Paul Elliot writing for Louder Sound wrote “for connoisseurs of histrionic heavy metal, it doesn’t get much better than this.”

Professional ratings
Review scores
Source	Rating
AllMusic	2.5/5 stars
Sputnikmusic	3/5
Metal Storm	8/10
Metal Temple Magazine	7/10
Louder Sound	3.5/5 stars

== Track listing ==
No.	Title	Lyrics	Music	Length
1.	"Darkest Hours"	Timo Kotipelto, Matias Kupiainen	Kupiainen	4:11
2.	"Under Flaming Skies"	Kotipelto	Kotipelto, Kupiainen	3:51
3.	"Infernal Maze"	Kotipelto	Kupiainen	5:33
4.	"Fairness Justified"	Kotipelto	Kupiainen	4:20
5.	"The Game Never Ends"	Jens Johansson	Johansson	3:53
6.	"Lifetime in a Moment"	Lauri Porra	Porra	6:38
7.	"Move the Mountain"	Johansson	Johansson	5:33
8.	"Event Horizon"	Kotipelto	Kupiainen	4:23
9.	"Elysium": "Part I"; "Part II"; "Part III"	Kupiainen, Kotipelto	Kupiainen	18:07
Total length:				56:29

Collector's edition bonus tracks
No.	Title	Lyrics	Music	Length
10.	"Hallowed"	Porra	Porra	5:57
11.	"Last Shore"	Porra	Porra	5:51
Total length:				68:23

Japanese edition bonus tracks
No.	Title	Lyrics	Music	Length
10.	"Castaway"	Porra	Porra	4:40
11.	"Darkest Hours" (demo)	Kotipelto, Kupiainen	Kupiainen	4:32
12.	"Against the Wind" (live)	Kotipelto, Timo Tolkki	Tolkki	4:02
13.	"Black Diamond" (live)	Kotipelto	Tolkki	7:30
Total length:				77:19

== Personnel ==
=== Stratovarius ===
- Timo Kotipelto – lead vocals
- Matias Kupiainen – guitar, keyboard programming, engineering, mixing (tracks 3, 4, 8, 9), production
- Jens Johansson – keyboard
- Jörg Michael – drums
- Lauri Porra – bass, keyboard programming

=== Additional credits ===
- Risto Kupiainen – keyboard programming, orchestral arrangement (track 3, 10), orchestral programming (tracks 1, 3, 10), choir programming (tracks 4, 9)
- Perttu Vänskä – orchestral arrangement (tracks 1, 2, 4, 9), orchestral programming (tracks 2, 4, 9), engineering, editing
- Arzka Sievälä – choir
- Jani Liimatainen – choir
- Aleksi Parviainen – choir
- Tipe Johnson – choir
- Anssi Stenberg – choir
- Marko "Hepa" Waara – choir
- Kalle Keski-Orvola – engineering, editing
- Santtu Lehtiniemi – engineering (guitar)
- Mikko Karmila – mixing (tracks 1, 2, 5–7)
- Svante Försback – mastering

== Charts ==
Chart (2011)	Peak position
Belgian Albums (Ultratop Wallonia)	80
Finnish Albums (Suomen virallinen lista)	1
French Albums (SNEP)	70
German Albums (Offizielle Top 100)	38
Japanese Albums (Oricon)	48
Swiss Albums (Schweizer Hitparade)	45
US Heatseekers Albums (Billboard)	47
UK Independent Albums (OCC)	28
UK Rock & Metal Albums (OCC)	22

== See also ==
- List of number-one albums of 2011 (Finland)
