= Fright Night (album) =

- Cover art by Patrick Woodroffe

Studio album by Stratovarius
- Released: May 1989
- Recorded: Finnvox Studios, Helsinki
- Genre: Heavy metal; power metal
- Length: 40:30
- Label: Columbia
- Producer: Stratovarius

Stratovarius chronology
Fright Night (1989)	Twilight Time (1992)

Singles from Fright Night
- 1. "Future Shock" / "Witch-Hunt" Released: 1988; 2. "Black Night" / "Night Screamer" Released: 1989

Fright Night is the first studio album by the power metal band Stratovarius, released in May 1989 by Columbia Records. A remastered edition was issued in 1993.

== Cover art ==
The cover art for Fright Night was created by British fantasy artist Patrick Woodroffe. Known for his surreal and gothic style, Woodroffe's artwork for the album reflects a dark and supernatural aesthetic.

== Critical reception ==
Professional ratings
Review scores
Source	Rating
AllMusic	2.5/5 stars

Antti J. Ravelin at AllMusic gave Fright Night 2.5 stars out of 5, describing it as lacking variety and criticising the band for not playing particularly well together. He nonetheless recommended the album for fans of 1980s heavy rock, saying that it was an important part of Stratovarius' discography.

== Track listing ==
All music is composed by Timo Tolkki

No.	Title	Lyrics	Length
1.	"Future Shock"	Tuomo Lassila, Tolkki	4:35
2.	"False Messiah"	Tolkki	5:20
3.	"Black Night"	Lassila	3:43
4.	"Witch-Hunt"	Lassila	3:22
5.	"Fire Dance"	(instrumental)	2:20
6.	"Fright Night"	Lassila, Tolkki	8:13
7.	"Night Screamer"	Lassila	4:48
8.	"Darkness"	Tolkki	6:57
9.	"Goodbye"	(instrumental)	1:12
Total length:			40:30

== Personnel ==
- Timo Tolkki – vocals, guitar, production
- Antti Ikonen – keyboards, production
- Tuomo Lassila – drums, production
- Jyrki Lentonen – bass guitar, production
- Make Törrönen – engineering
- Mika Jussila – remastering (reissue)

== Charts ==
Chart (2021)	Peak position
Finnish Albums (Suomen virallinen lista)	48
