= Dreamspace =

Studio album by Stratovarius
- Released: 9 February 1994
- Studio: Rauhala Estate; Sibelius Academy; University of Helsinki Department of Musicology; Swat Team Palace; Soundtrack Studios
- Genre: Heavy metal; power metal
- Length: 63:52
- Label: Noise
- Producer: Timo Tolkki

Stratovarius chronology
Twilight Time (1992)	Dreamspace (1994)	Fourth Dimension (1995)

Singles from Dreamspace
- 1. "Wings of Tomorrow" / "Dreamspace" Released: 1995

Dreamspace is the third studio album by power metal band Stratovarius, released on 9 February 1994 through Noise Records. It is the last Stratovarius album to feature guitarist Timo Tolkki on vocals (after which Timo Kotipelto became the lead singer on 1995's Fourth Dimension), as well as the first to feature bassist Jari Kainulainen. Sami Kuoppamäki was asked to record drums for some of the songs after drummer Tuomo Lassila was unable to finish the sessions due to tendonitis.

== Critical reception ==
Professional ratings
Review scores
Source	Rating
AllMusic	4/5 stars

Steve Huey at AllMusic gave Dreamspace four stars out of five, saying that it "demonstrates the band coming into its own, honing its melodic Euro-metal attack to a razor-sharp point."

== Track listing ==
All music is composed by Timo Tolkki.

No.	Title	Lyrics	Length
1.	"Chasing Shadows"	Tolkki	4:38
2.	"4th Reich"	Tolkki	5:49
3.	"Eyes of the World"	Tolkki	5:56
4.	"Hold On to Your Dream"	Tolkki, Tuomo Lassila	3:34
5.	"Magic Carpet Ride"	Tolkki	4:49
6.	"We Are the Future"	Tolkki	5:19
7.	"Tears of Ice"	Tolkki	5:15
8.	"Dreamspace"	Tolkki	5:57
9.	"Reign of Terror"	Tolkki	3:28
10.	"Thin Ice"	Lassila	4:23
11.	"Atlantis"	(instrumental)	1:07
12.	"Abyss"	Lassila	4:59
13.	"Shattered"	Lassila	3:29
14.	"Wings of Tomorrow"	Tolkki	5:09
Total length:			63:52

Japanese edition bonus track
No.	Title	Lyrics	Length
15.	"Full Moon"	Tolkki	4:33

== Personnel ==
- Timo Tolkki – vocals, guitar, engineering, mixing, production
- Antti Ikonen – keyboards, computer
- Tuomo Lassila – drums (tracks 1, 2, 5, 8–12, 14), percussion, flute
- Sami Kuoppamäki – drums (tracks 3, 4, 6, 7, 13)
- Jari Kainulainen – bass guitar
- Sole – oboe
- Mikko Karmila – mixing

== Charts ==
Chart (1994)	Peak position
Japanese Albums (Oricon)	26
