= Twilight Time (album) =

Studio album by Stratovarius
- Released: Early 1992
- Recorded: Millbrook Musiikki in Helsinki
- Genre: Heavy metal; power metal
- Length: 41:59
- Label: Shark
- Producer: Stratovarius

Stratovarius chronology
Fright Night (1989)	Twilight Time (1992)	Dreamspace (1994)

Alternative cover
- Original cover

Alternative cover
- 1992 reissue

Singles from Twilight Time
- 1. "Break the Ice" / "Lead Us into the Light" Released: 1992

Twilight Time is the second studio album by the power metal band Stratovarius. The album was originally recorded and released in the band's native Finland as Stratovarius II in early 1992 by Bluelight Records.

Stratovarius got a new international record deal from Shark Records later in the same year. The album was released worldwide under a new name, Twilight Time, and different artwork, although it remained musically unchanged. In June 1993, the album was also released in Japan by Victor Entertainment as Twilight Time.

Bluelight Records made two reissues of the album in Finland, retaining the name Stratovarius II. Released in 1992 and 1993, these reissues changed the cover artwork by replacing the original "feet" picture with a picture of the band members. That same picture can be found on the back cover of the Twilight Time releases.

The Stratovarius II releases, especially the ones with the original "feet" cover, are considered somewhat collector items. The initial Finnish pressings of the album were small, and it has never been repressed or released internationally with the original name or cover.

Bassist Jari Behm appears in the band photos of the release and is credited with playing, but all bass parts on the album were actually performed by the guitarist and then-bandleader Timo Tolkki.

== Critical reception ==
Professional ratings
Review scores
Source	Rating
AllMusic	3/5 stars

Steve Huey at AllMusic notes that Twilight Time significantly helped to establish Stratovarius' popularity in Japan, and that the band's "melodic, retro-British/power metal sound really started to jell."

== Track listing ==
All music is composed by Timo Tolkki

No.	Title	Lyrics	Length
1.	"Break the Ice"	Tuomo Lassila	4:42
2.	"The Hands of Time"	Tolkki, Lassila	5:35
3.	"Madness Strikes at Midnight"	Tolkki	7:19
4.	"Metal Frenzy"	(instrumental)	2:20
5.	"Twilight Time"	Tolkki, Lassila	5:50
6.	"The Hills Have Eyes"	Lassila	6:19
7.	"Out of the Shadows"	Tolkki, Lassila	4:09
8.	"Lead Us into the Light"	Tolkki	5:45
Total length:			41:59

== Personnel ==
- Timo Tolkki – vocals, guitar, bass guitar, production
- Antti Ikonen – keyboard, production
- Tuomo Lassila – drums, percussion, production
- Juha Heininen – engineering, mixing

== Charts ==
Chart (1992)	Peak position
Japanese Albums (Oricon)	43
