= Tuomo Lassila =

- Born: 13 November 1965 (age 59); Helsinki, Finland
- Genres: Power metal, progressive metal, neoclassical metal, heavy metal, instrumental rock
- Occupation(s): Musician, songwriter
- Instrument(s): Drums, percussion, flute, vocals (early)
- Years active: 1984–1995, 1998–2002, 2011–present

Tuomo Ollinpoika Lassila (born 1965) is a Finnish percussionist and heavy metal drummer. He is best known as the former drummer, founding member and co-songwriter of the power metal band Stratovarius from 1985 to 1995. Currently he is the principal percussionist of the Lohja City Orchestra and the drummer and percussionist for the Finnish metal band Conquest.

== Music career ==
Lassila was born in Helsinki in 1965. He studied the flute in Helsinki Conservatory of Music, but after being asked to be the drummer in a rock band, he concentrated his studies in percussion instead.

Lassila became one of the original founding members of "Black Water" (early Stratovarius name), the others being bassist John Vihervä and guitarist Staffan Stråhlman. He is credited with coming up with the band's current name after combining the words "Stratocaster" and "Stradivarius". In 1985, Stråhlman quit the band and Lassila approached guitarist Timo Tolkki to fill in the position. During his time with the band, he was (besides Tolkki) the band's co-leader and secondary songwriter (primarily during the first two albums) and also the only original member remaining in the band before leaving in late 1995 after the Fourth Dimension tour, along with original keyboardist Antti Ikonen due to creative disagreements with Tolkki over the direction the band was heading.

After leaving Stratovarius he temporarily retired from performing and graduated as percussionist from Sibelius Academy in 1997. He has been the principal percussionist of Lohja City Orchestra since 2002. In 1998, he joined the Finnish band Conquest, led by Peter James Goodman and played drums in their first album Worlds Apart (released in 1999) and also in a tribute (with Conquest) to Iron Maiden, playing in the song "The Evil That Men Do" on the tribute album Slave to the Power which was released in 2000. Conquest subsequently disbanded in 2002 and Lassila dedicated to play in orchestral projects.

He rejoined a reformed Conquest in 2011, initially as a guest member in their second album "The Harvest" (their first in almost 12 years) but at the end of the year, he again became a full-time member after the departure of drummer Ville Siuruainen and went with the band on a small tour within Finland.

On 28 October 2013 it was announced that Tuomo Lassila will be the drummer for the second album of his former Stratovarius bandmate Timo Tolkki's metal opera Avalon. A few weeks later, on 23 November, it was also announced that Antti Ikonen is also joining the project, being the first time the three original members of Stratovarius reunite to make music in nearly in 20 years.

In the summer 2022 Lassila, Tolkki, and Ikonen met to discuss a possibility of a reunion, deciding to call themselves Timo Tolkki's Strato. "In secrecy, they have been rehearsing in Tuomo's garage since January 2023."

== Discography ==
=== Stratovarius ===
- 1989: Fright Night
- 1992: Twilight Time
- 1994: Dreamspace
- 1995: Fourth Dimension

=== Timo Tolkki ===
- 1994: Classical Variations and Themes

=== Conquest ===
- 1999: Worlds Apart
- 2011: The Harvest

=== Timo Tolkki's Avalon ===
- 2014: Angels of the Apocalypse
