= Eternal (Stratovarius album) =

Studio album by Stratovarius
- Released: 11 September 2015
- Length: 54:19
- Label: Edel
- Producer: Matias Kupiainen

Stratovarius chronology
Nemesis (2013)	Eternal (2015)	Best Of (2016)

Eternal is the fifteenth album by Finnish power metal band Stratovarius, released on 11 September 2015 (Europe) and 18 September (United States). Eternal reached No. 5 on the Finnish albums chart. Singer Timo Kotipelto composed three tracks and wrote most lyrics together with his Cain's Offering partner and former Sonata Arctica member Jani Liimatainen.

The band members have described the album as a blend of old school and modern power metal, though this direction was not planned, according to keyboardist Jens Johansson.

== Background, composing and lyrical themes ==
The band wanted to start working on the album in 2014, but they felt they didn't have enough good songs. After playing a few special Visions shows, they became surprised with the audience response and found some motivation to get back to the studio. The album cover was ready one year prior to the album's release, but not its title. After discussing suggestions from the members, they finally agreed on bassist Lauri Porra's Eternal, making it the band's seventh album with a seven-letter title.

The opening track, "My Eternal Dream", is about feeling different from other people around and fulfilling dreams no matter what others say. It received a video that premiered on 10 September. "Shine in the Dark" was released as the first single and received a lyric video. It was composed a year before the album was released and is about "a person who has passed away a long time ago but is still remembered with warmth." "Rise Above It" is about lies told by the media and how people should read the news with caution.

"Lost Without a Trace", Porra's only writing contribution, is about a man that is in search of his love, but flees every time he finds it, afraid of a real commitment. "Feeding the Fire" states that humankind, instead of taking actions towards the protection of planet Earth, is just making things worse. "In My Line of Work" covers the issue of having a job that keeps one far from their family and friends.

Johansson contributed with two songs for the album, apart from the bonus tracks: "Man in the Mirror", about a man who cannot recognize himself when looking at the mirror; and "Fire in Your Eyes", about perceiving the fire in the loved one's eyes and finding the strength to carry on.

"Few Are Those" was originally rejected by the band. However, when Rolf Pilve was recording his drums parts, Kotipelto asked him to record a track in a particular tempo, feeling he and Jani would be able to build something around it. Later, he received the drum track and composed the song on top of it. The lyrics are about the few people who are able to "see with their own eyes and feel with their own hearts".

The ending track, "The Lost Saga", is the longest song on the album. In the liner notes, Kotipelto states that writing the lyrics, which deal with Vikings and battles, was the "hardest work he has ever done". He spent four nights researching historical references.

== Track listing ==
All lyrics are written by Timo Kotipelto and Jani Liimatainen, except where noted.

No.	Title	Music	Length
1.	"My Eternal Dream"	Matias Kupiainen	6:04
2.	"Shine in the Dark"	Kotipelto, Liimatainen	5:05
3.	"Rise Above It"	Kupiainen	4:26
4.	"Lost Without a Trace"	Lauri Porra	5:27
5.	"Feeding the Fire"	Kupiainen	4:12
6.	"In My Line of Work"	Kotipelto, Liimatainen	4:18
7.	"Man in the Mirror" (lyrics: Jens Johansson)	Johansson	4:43
8.	"Few Are Those"	Kotipelto, Liimatainen	4:11
9.	"Fire in Your Eyes" (lyrics: Johansson)	Johansson	4:14
10.	"The Lost Saga"	Kupiainen	11:39
Total length:			54:19

Japanese edition bonus tracks
No.	Title	Music	Length
6.	"Endless Forest" (instrumental)	Johansson	2:15
7.	"Giants" (lyrics: Johansson)	Johansson	5:28

== Reception ==
Professional ratings
Review scores
Source	Rating
Blabbermouth.net	8/10
Metalcrypt.com	4/5
Myglobalmind.com	9/10
Sleazer Roxx	Favorable
Metal Temple Magazine	10/10

The album was met with generally favorable reviews Blabbermouth.net gave the album a positive review stating, “Stratovarius engineers another detailed and often snappy album. There are no surprises to "Eternal", only by the numbers power metal soaked with the band's usual opulence and professionalism. Daniel Fox, for Metal Temple Magazine, wrote “Eternal" is the overall-best album the band have put out since the 90's.” Bruno Medeiros from Metalcrypt stated, “returning fans and casual listeners alike should enjoy Eternal almost in its entirety, as it is not overly melodic nor is it trying to reinvent the wheel, instead relying on solid performances and down-to-earth songwriting.

== Personnel ==
- Timo Kotipelto – vocals
- Matias Kupiainen – guitar, production
- Jens Johansson – keyboard
- Rolf Pilve – drums
- Lauri Porra – bass

== Charts ==
Chart (2015)	Peak position
Austrian Albums (Ö3 Austria)	69
Belgian Albums (Ultratop Flanders)	78
Belgian Albums (Ultratop Wallonia)	45
Finnish Albums (Suomen virallinen lista)	5
French Albums (SNEP)	61
German Albums (Offizielle Top 100)	27
Japanese Albums (Oricon)	23
Swiss Albums (Schweizer Hitparade)	22
UK Independent Albums (OCC)	35
UK Rock & Metal Albums (OCC)	22
