= Stratovarius =

Finnish power metal band

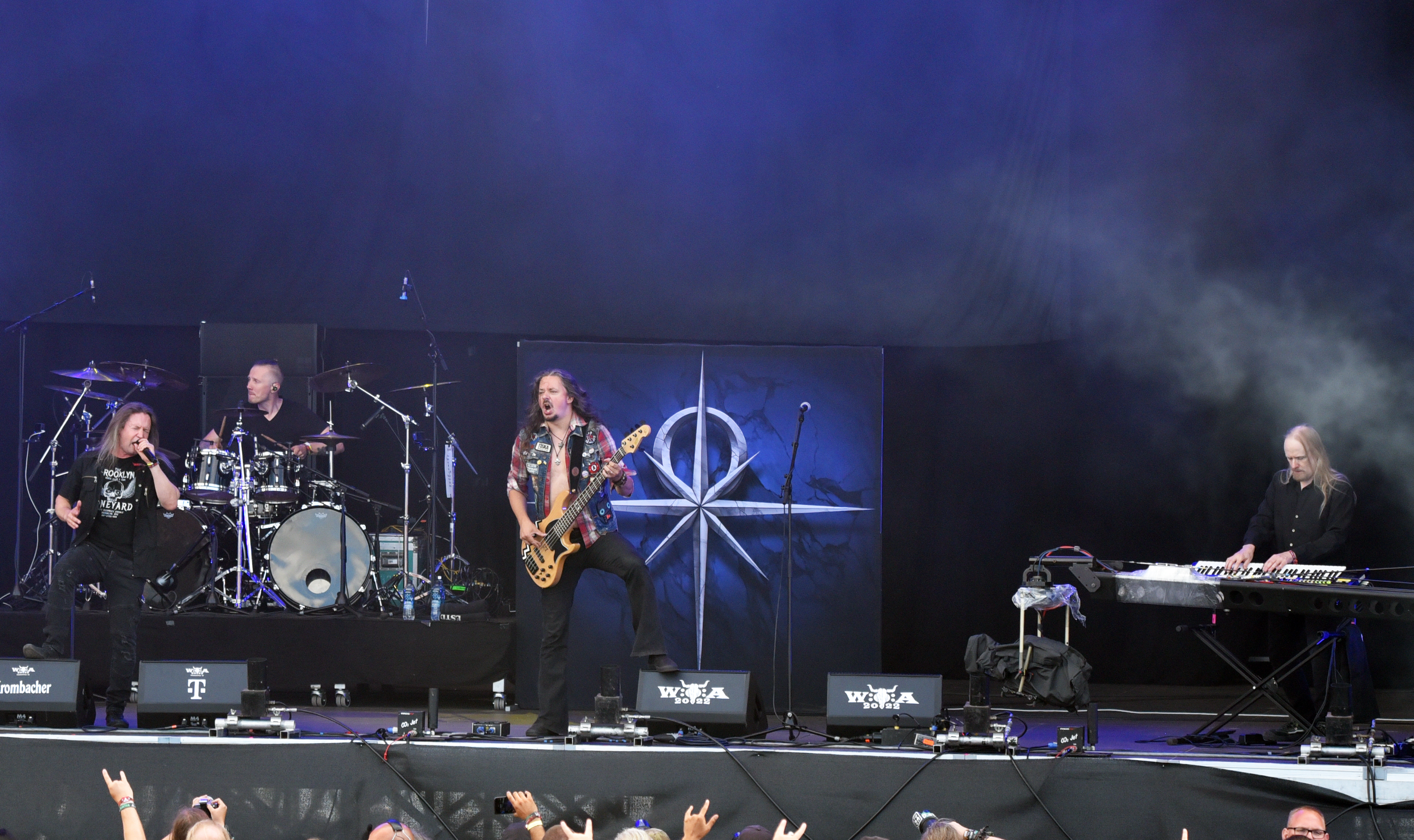
- Stratovarius at Wacken Open Air 2022

Background information
- Also known as: Black Water
- Origin: Helsinki, Finland
- Genres: Power metal; neoclassical metal; symphonic metal
- Years active: 1984–present
- Labels: earMUSIC; Nuclear Blast; Sanctuary; Noise
- Members: Timo Kotipelto; Jens Johansson; Lauri Porra; Matias Kupiainen; Rolf Pilve
- Past members: Timo Tolkki; Jörg Michael; Jari Kainulainen; Antti Ikonen; Tuomo Lassila; Staffan Stråhlman; John Vihervä; Mika Ervaskari; Jyrki Lentonen; Jari Behm
- Website: stratovarius.com

Stratovarius is a Finnish power metal band formed in 1984. They have released sixteen studio albums, six DVDs, and six live albums. The band's line-up has changed many times, with no founding member left since the departure of drummer Tuomo Lassila in 1995, and no member from their early recording days left following guitarist Timo Tolkki's departure in 2008. Currently, the longest standing member is singer Timo Kotipelto, who joined in 1994.

The band was founded in August 1984 as Black Water, consisting of Lassila as singer and drummer, guitarist Staffan Stråhlman, bassist John Vihervä, and, later, keyboardist Antti Ikonen. In Summer 1985, the band changed its name to Stratovarius, which was soon followed by line-up changes. Tolkki replaced Stråhlman and with this line-up, the band released its first album Fright Night in 1989, with Tolkki as sole songwriter. While going through many bassists, the band released the albums Twilight Time in 1992 and Dreamspace in 1994. In 1994, Kotipelto replaced Tolkki as lead vocalist, and after the release of Fourth Dimension in 1995, Lassila and Ikonen left the band and were replaced by Jörg Michael and Jens Johansson respectively.

This line-up, sometimes identified as the "classic line-up" of Stratovarius, lasted ten years and released eight albums, including most of their popular works, until Tolkki's departure in 2008; Tolkki had originally intended to disband Stratovarius, but allowed the rest of the band to continue without him. The band's following albums were all positively received, and were acknowledged as a return to form for the band. The current line-up, which has remained the same since the arrival of drummer Rolf Pilve in 2012, is the longest-tenured in the band's history.

The group have topped the charts in their native Finland four times and are viewed as a significant and influential band in the power metal genre.

== History ==
=== Early years (1984–1990) ===
Black Water was founded in August 1984 in Finland. They went through a number of personnel and style changes before the band found its own voice. The founding members were Tuomo Lassila, Staffan Stråhlman, and John Vihervä. Towards the end of 1984, bassist John Vihervä left the band, being replaced by Jyrki Lentonen, Timo Tolkki's former bandmate in a band called Road Block. After some small live performances, Stråhlman also left the band in 1985, a few days before an important concert in Aalborg, Denmark. Staffan was replaced by Timo Tolkki, a skilled guitarist and singer influenced by the musical style of Ritchie Blackmore and Rainbow, as well as an admirer of gothic music. His entry into the band also allowed Tuomo to concentrate solely on the drums, leaving the vocals entirely to the new addition.

By the end of 1985, the band had disbanded and reformed as Stratovarius (a portmanteau of Stratocaster and Stradivarius, which is also the name of an early Kraftwerk song), with guitarist/vocalist Tolkki becoming the driving force and mastermind of the band, having nearly complete control of the song-writing. In 1988 they added keyboardist Antti Ikonen to their lineup, that same year they released their first two singles, "Future Shock" and "Black Night" and were signed by CBS Finland. In 1989, their debut album Fright Night was released which peaked at number 48 on the Finnish Charts. The album release would be accompanied by a small tour of Europe.

=== Twilight Time, Dreamspace and Fourth Dimension (1991–1995) ===
After being dropped by CBS, the band went through several member changes, In early 1990, they began composing new songs, and in 1991 they returned to the studio to produce a new album. The album was originally released in early 1992 in Finland, titled Stratovarius II, but later, due to its successful performance, it was released throughout Europe in October of the same year now under the title Twilight Time. The album was also released in Japan, where it reached number 10 in the Best Foreign Albums chart within a few weeks, and peaked at number 43 on the mainstream Japan charts, and in 1993 it became the Best Import Album. On this album, Tolkki played bass as well as guitar on all tracks, despite Jari Behm receiving credit on the album. After Twilight Time was released, Behm was fired and replaced with Jari Kainulainen, with the new lineup, the band embarked on a nearly year-long world tour, including numerous overseas stops.

New material was written from the spring to summer 1994 and band hit the studio following a Japan Tour. During this time Timo Tolkki also recorded a solo album "Classical Variations and Themes". Stratovarius spent the whole summer of 1994 in studio finishing its fourth album. The album Dreamspace was then released which help them continue with the success in Japan as it peaked at number 26. Following this release Timo Tolkki stepped down as lead singer to concentrate on guitar and songwriting as well as to move Stratovarius in a new direction. Dreamspace was the last album that followed the style of the band's initial releases before the group adopted the more neo-classical/symphonic style which they became famous for. In June of that year, the group flew back to Japan to play in Tokyo, Osaka, and Nagoya. The group also performed at the famous Finnish venue, the Shadow Club, in Helsinki.

The band started auditions for a new singer, eventually choosing Timo Kotipelto. In 1995, the band released their first album with Kotipelto on vocals, Fourth Dimension, which was accompanied by a music video for the song "Against the Wind". This was the last album with a singing performance by Timo Tolkki, being featured as a backing vocalist on this album. This was the first album that showed signs of the new direction the band was heading, with tracks such as "Twilight Symphony" using an orchestra for the first time in their recordings. The album was met with critical acclaim and continued to boost their popularity even more. The band then set off on a new tour with stops in Germany, Switzerland, the Netherlands, Finland, Greece and Japan.

=== Departures of Tuomo Lassila and Antti Ikonen, Episode, Visions and Destiny (1996–1999) ===
That same year, 1995, Tuomo Lassila, the last member of Black Water, and Antti Ikonen were fired from the band. This decision was, as Tolkki referred to years later shortly after leaving the band in 2008, "due to a non-dedication to the band's activities. They both were not at all into heavy metal and I don't think they ever thought that the band could become so successful. They didn't like the direction the music was heading."

This left Stratovarius searching for a new drummer and keyboardist. Jörg Michael from Rage was hired as their drummer and soon after, Jens Johansson of Yngwie Malmsteen-fame was hired as keyboardist, a position he has held to this date. This new line-up then started released Episode in 1996 which peaked at number 21 on the Finnish Charts and number 20 in Japan. The recording took place at Finnvox Studios in Helsinki. the album showcased further improvements in the band's style and sound, which, thanks in part to the addition of new members Johansson and Michael, became much more dramatic, melodic, and symphonic than their previous albums. Furthermore, for the first time, the band recorded with a choir of forty singers and a twenty-piece orchestra. The album also featured the classic tracks "Father Time," "Eternity," and "Will the Sun Rise?", The line-up on this album proved to be their most stable, remaining the same until the release of Polaris in 2009. The supporting tour for the album took place throughout Europe in late 1996.

In 1997, the band released their sixth studio album, titled Visions. This album was released to a very positive reception and featured notable songs "The Kiss of Judas", "Black Diamond" and the title track "Visions (Southern Cross)", a 10-minute epic and their longest song at the time. "Black Diamond" has become one of their most recognized songs, and has been included in almost all live setlists since its release. It is often considered their breakthrough album, and one of the most influential in the power metal scene. Achieving impressive sales album reaching number 4 on the Finnish albums chart. The band then embarked on a new tour in support of the album, including stops in Japan, Europe, and South America.. Visions eventually sold 20,000 copies in Finland, earning the band their first gold record, which they celebrated with a huge party at the Tavastia Club in Helsinki on June 10, 1998.

The band released the album Destiny in 1998. which became their first to reach No. 1 on the Finnish charts. Destiny contained "S.O.S." (which reached number 2 of the Finnish Singles chart) and "Rebel", as well as the 10-minute title track "Destiny". The album quickly sold 20,000 copies in Finland and was certified gold. In March of the same year, Stratovarius' first live album, Visions of Europe, was also released. It was a double CD version lasting one hundred minutes in total, recorded during performances in Milan and Athens, and became a great critical and sales success for the band. The Band began their "Destiny Tour" in the Spring of 1998, the tour concluded in Japan on December 17. The second leg of the tour took place throughout 1999 mainly taking place in Europe along with a few shows in Brazil.

from 1998 into 1999 the band was awarded/nominated for a plethora of awards including earning major recognition from Finnish metal fans, topping the annual readers’ poll of SFP magazine as the country’s leading metal act. Their video for “S.O.S.” was also named Finland’s best domestic metal video of 1998 in the same poll. The band’s popularity was further highlighted in Soundi magazine’s readers’ survey, where Timo Tolkki secured a decisive win in the “Best Musician” category for the second consecutive year. Stratovarius ranked as the second most popular band overall, while vocalist Timo Kotipelto placed third among singers. Their album Destiny was voted the second-best release of the year, and “S.O.S.” placed second in the song category. Both Tolkki and Kotipelto were also recognized among the most admired personalities, and keyboardist Jens Johansson was featured in the foreign musicians category. On top of these fan-driven honors, the band received an official accolade from the Finnish music industry, taking home an Emma trophy for being an outstanding export band.

=== Infinite, Intermission and Elements, Pts. 1 & 2 (2000–2003) ===
In 2000, the album Infinite was released. Just like its predecessor, Infinite reached No.1 on the Finnish chart, the last time one of their albums would do so until the release of Elysium in 2011. Hunting High and Low" and "A Million Light Years Away" were released as singles, reaching No. 4 and 14 respectively on the Finnish singles chart. Continuing the trend of featuring lengthy symphonic pieces, the titular track, "Infinity", is over nine minutes long. Featured songs are "Hunting High and Low" and "A Million Light Years Away". The band the supported the album with a multiple continent tour. Infinite was certified Platinum in June 2013, with 21,907 copies sold. The band then embarked on the "Infinite Tour" begging in Finland in March of 2000, the tour lasted till December of that year with legs in Europe, Japan and South America.

While Stratovarius was performing at Europe's largest metal music festival, Wacken Open Air, in Germany on 4 August 2000, lead singer Timo Kotipelto burned his left hand in a pyrotechnic explosion, resulting in second and third degree burns to two fingers and the back of his hand. Kotipelto was able to sing until the end of the concert, but the band's Latin American tour was cancelled, giving him time to recover.

The following year saw the release of Intermission, a compilation album of B-Sides, bonus tracks from previous albums and unreleased material. During this time, the band took a break from working on new material. It was at this time that Timo Tolkki released his second solo album, Hymn to Life, and guest appeared on the Avantasia album The Metal Opera (Tolkki would later play guest guitar on the sequel album, The Metal Opera Part II). Timo Kotipelto also began his side project Kotipelto, with the first album, Waiting for the Dawn, released in 2002.

In 2002, the band started work on their next project, titled Elements. Initially conceived as a double album, the project was eventually split into two different releases, with Elements Pt. 1 and Elements Pt. 2 being released the same year in 2003. This would contain some of the group's most ambitious work yet, with the title track "Elements" on Elements Pt. 1 clocking in at 12 minutes, the longest song the band would write until the release of Elysium in 2011. Elements was also the first, and so far only attempt at recording a double-album, and showed the band experimenting with their musical style. From March to August 2003, the band toured throughout Europe, Japan, Brazil and Mexico in support of Elements Pt. 1.

=== Hiatus, Stratovarius and Tolkki's departure (2004–2008) ===
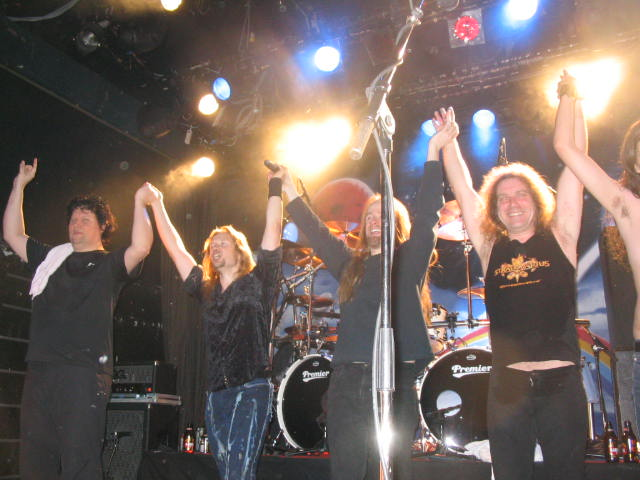
Stratovarius in 2006

During this period, tensions were increasing in the band, and in 2004 Stratovarius temporarily disbanded after Timo Tolkki suffered a nervous breakdown. A couple of months after the breakdown, Tolkki was diagnosed with bipolar disorder and went into rehabilitation for a period. During this time, Timo Kotipelto released his second album with his side project Kotipelto titled Coldness. It was also during this time that Stratovarius orchestrated a series of publicity stunts, including Kotipelto being fired and replaced by a female singer named "Miss K" (Katriina Wiiala), as well as Tolkki being stabbed at a concert. Eventually, the stunts were revealed to be a hoax, and Tolkki reunited the band to begin work on their next album. In 2005, the self-titled album Stratovarius was released. The album reached No. 4 on the Finnish albums chart as well as the top 100 in six other countries. Despite the commercial success it was met with hostile reception by fans. Stratovarius featured a very different style compared to previous efforts, containing almost no symphonic or neo-classical elements in the music or soloing of Tolkki and Johansson that fans were used to, and did not feature any lengthy epics. Tolkki was also highly critical of the album, and Stratovarius was proof of the relationship between band members at an all-time low. Seemingly against Tolkki's wishes, Jari Kainulainen was fired in 2005 following the release of the album for reasons Tolkki said were "so absurd that I am not even [going to] try and explain them here". Kainulainen was quickly replaced with Lauri Porra. During this time the band embarked on a world tour and in 2006 the band began work on a new album that was tentatively titled R...R.... However, as internal issues increased, the project stalled. The band did tour throughout 2006, taking part in the Monster Metal Madness Tour along with their own headlining tour.

Eventually, the band reached a divide, with Johansson and Porra supporting Tolkki on one side, and Kotipelto and Michael on the other. Finally, on 4 March 2008, Tolkki officially declared that he was disbanding Stratovarius:

"It is time to stop the silence and announce what some of you have already been speculating. Stratovarius is no more..."

As Tolkki held the rights to the name Stratovarius and all its royalties, it was his initial intention to completely disband Stratovarius. However, on 20 May 2008 he agreed to sign over the rights to the name Stratovarius and all its royalties to Timo Kotipelto, Jens Johansson and Jörg Michael (though Michael was initially against using the name Stratovarius), allowing Stratovarius to continue on without him. Tolkki later took the songs he wrote for the R...R... sessions and formed the band Revolution Renaissance, using the R...R... to form the name of the band, instead of the album. Subsequently, on August 22, 2008, news appeared on Stratovarius' official website that the remaining members of the band had chosen a new guitarist to replace Tolkki: Matias Kupiainen, with whom they recorded a new album initially called King of Nothing, but later renamed Polaris.

=== First years without Tolkki: Polaris and Elysium (2009–2012) ===
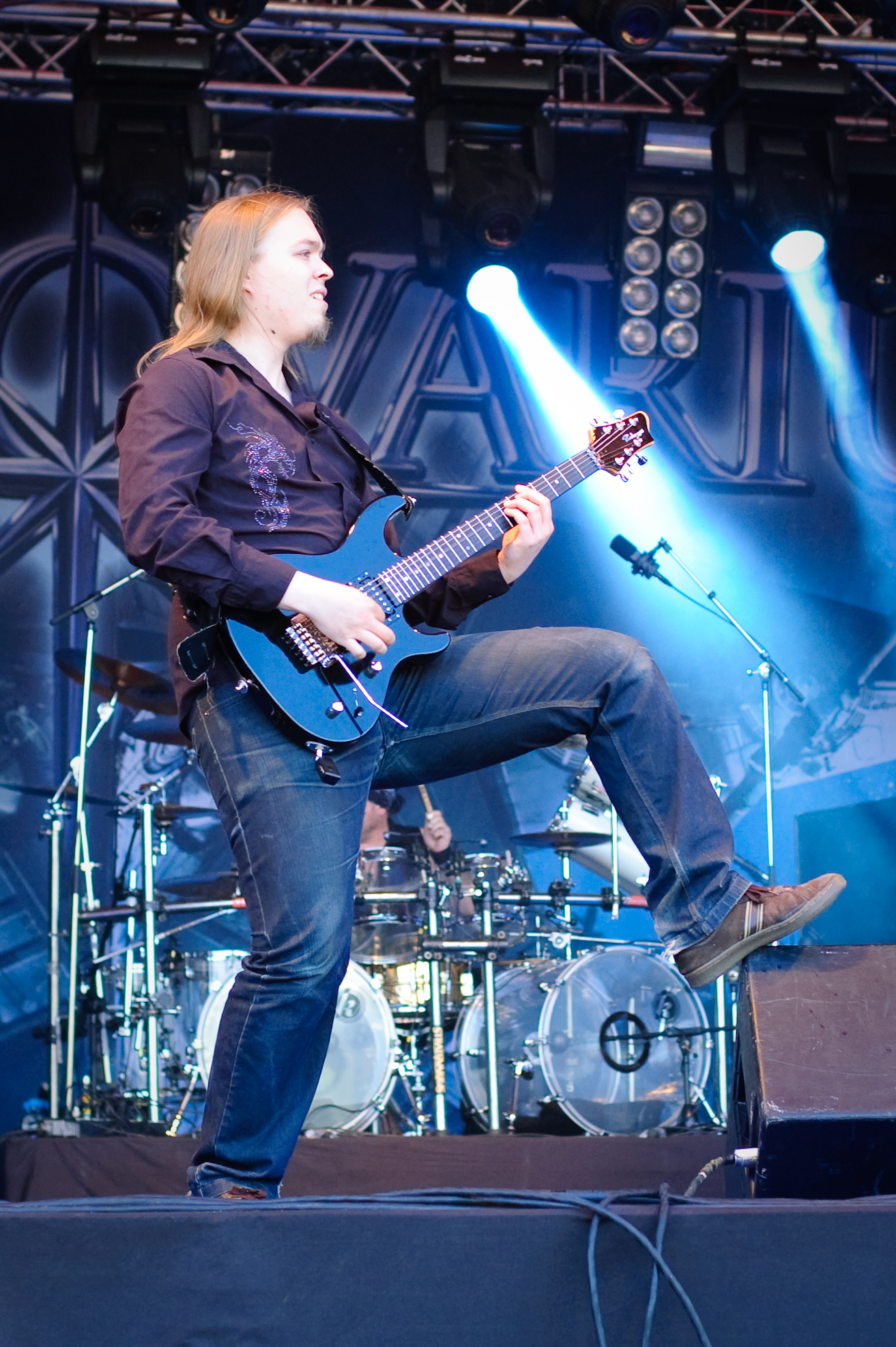
Matias Kupiainen joined the band in 2008.

Polaris was released in 2009 and reached No. 2 in Finland, and was met with positive reception. It was the first album after the departure of Timo Tolkki and Jari Kainulainen, and featured in their place new guitarist Matias Kupiainen and bassist Lauri Porra. The album yielded the two singles "Deep Unknown" and "Higher We Go". In 2010, the album was re-released along with various live material recorded during the Polaris Tour. The Polaris Tour ran through the second half of 2009, with legs in North America, South America and Europe.

In September 2010, Stratovarius announced the start of recording of their second album with Matias Kupiainen on guitar. Before officially launching the album, the Darkest Hours EP was released with the new songs "Darkest Hours" and "Infernal Maze", plus two live recordings of older songs. To promote the new album, Stratovarius toured as guests on Helloween's Seven Sinners Tour. As Stratovarius's drummer Jörg Michael was diagnosed with cancer, he was temporarily replaced by Alex Landenburg.

That same year Stratovarius released a special edition version of Infinite in. The re-release came as a two disc set, 3 new songs, 2 demos, 2 live tracks and a digitally remastered album cover.

In 2011, the band released their new album titled Elysium, which quickly reached No. 1 in Finland, the first of their albums to reach No.1 since Infinite. Notable songs on the album include the singles "Darkest Hours", (which reached No. 4 on the Finnish singles chart) "Under Flaming Skies", and the 18-minute epic "Elysium", the longest song that Stratovarius has ever recorded. The album received positive reviews with Louder Sound noting “for connoisseurs of histrionic heavy metal, it doesn’t get much better than this.”

During this period they also took part in the 7 Sinners World Tour 2010/11 alongside Helloween.

Jörg Michael announced his plans to leave the band for personal reasons. Jörg played the remaining tour dates until 31 January in Guatemala City, and celebrated with a special Finnish "Farewell Jörg" tour from 18 to 26 November.

In March 2012, the band announced a drummer search on their Facebook page. On 20 June 2012, the band announced that Rolf Pilve was their new drummer. Throughout the year Stratovarius played various shows in Europe, Guatemala and the US.

On 29 June 2012, live album and DVD Under Flaming Winter Skies - Live In Tampere was released. It was filmed in Tampere, Finland, on 19 November 2011. It is the last release with drummer Jörg Michael.

=== Nemesis, Eternal, Enigma and Intermission 2 (2013–2020) ===
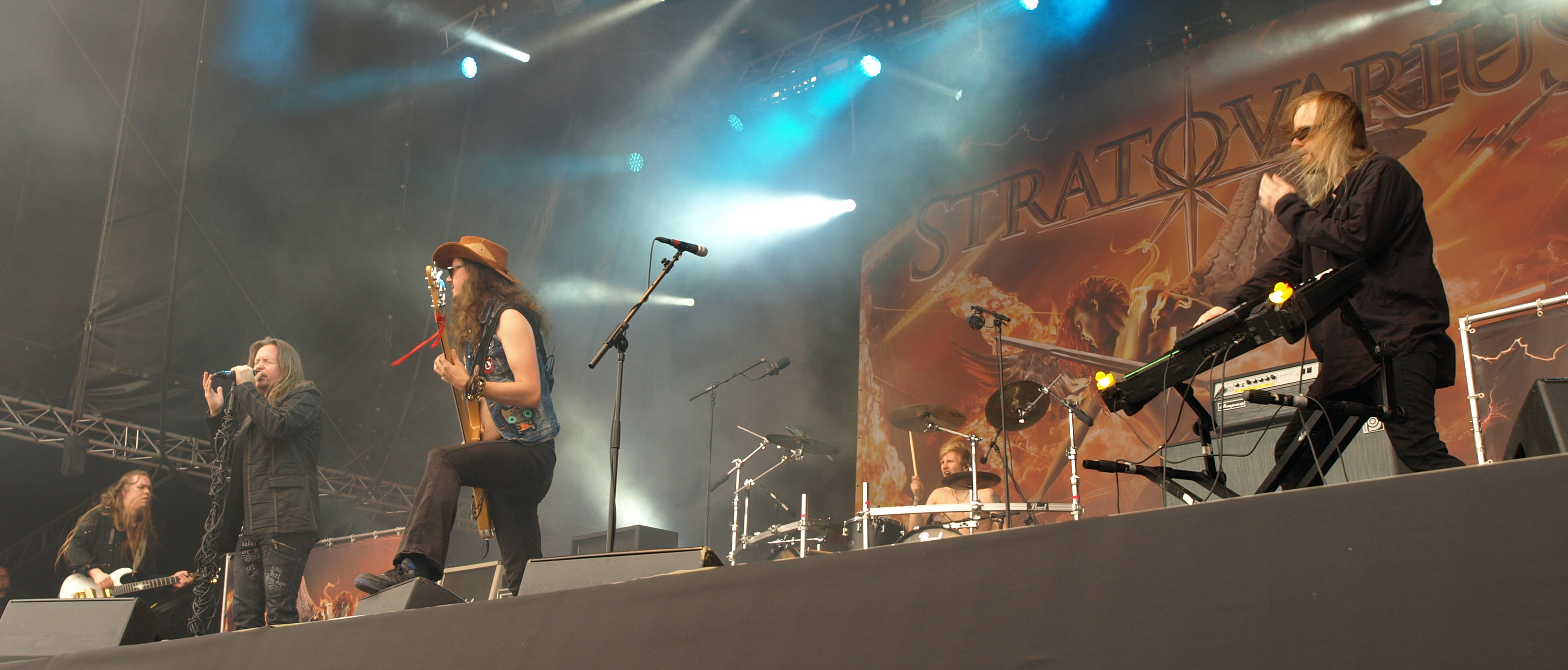
Stratovarius live at Tuska 2013. From left to right: Matias Kupiainen, Timo Kotipelto, Lauri Porra, Rolf Pilve and Jens Johansson.

Their next album, Nemesis, was released on 22 February 2013. The first single, "Unbreakable", was released on 25 January 2013. Nemesis reached No. 3 on the Finnish albums charts and charted in the top 100 in 8 other countries. it received generally positive reviews from critics, Metal Storm wrote “Even after all their previous dramas Stratovarius have made Nemesis their most expressive return to form.” The "Nemesis World Tour" ran throughout 2013, with Legs in Europe, Asia, South America and Australia. They also released a DVD called Nemesis Days with some Nemesis World Tour recordings in this same year.

In August 2014, the band announced they would play a few shows dedicated to their 1997 hit album Visions. During these shows, the whole album was played. The premiere of these concept shows was 12 September 2014: their headliner performance at Progpower USA in Atlanta.

On 5 December 2014, Elements Pt. 1 and Elements Pt. 2 were reissued as a box set that included the high quality 3CD+DVD digi-pak, a cassette including previously unreleased demo songs not available anywhere else, an "Elements" tour T-shirt as well as a reproduction of the original tour program.

On 24 April 2015, Stratovarius announced their fifteenth studio album, Eternal, would be released on 11 September 2015. On 23 June 2015, Stratovarius unveiled Eternal's cover, as well as the official track list of the album. On 30 July 2015, the band announced that the lead single from Eternal would be "Shine in the Dark". An official lyric video featuring vocalist Timo Kotipelto was uploaded to YouTube. In October 2015, Stratovarius embarked on a world tour to promote the new album. They began this with a European Tour of 16 countries including France, Germany, and the Netherlands. Gloryhammer and Divine Ascension were the supporting acts for the European leg of the tour. Eternal reached No. 5 on the Finnish albums chart and once again received positive reviews. On 20 May 2016, the band released their Best Of compilation, which included one previously unreleased track called "Until the End of Days". In the summer of that same year they re released their entire catalog with high quality packaging and bonus material.

In autumn 2017, Jari Kainulainen joined the band for several concerts in Finland due to the conflict in Lauri Porra's schedule.

On 13 January 2018, Kotipelto discussed recent anniversary shows and also commented that the band were hoping to record a new album during spring 2018. On 10 August 2018, Stratovarius released the new song "Oblivion" from the upcoming compilation album Enigma: Intermission 2, which came out 28 September 2018. It is the follow-up to 2001's Intermission. The band supported the new album with a European tour with Tarja Turunen on the A Nordic Symphony '18 tour.

In 2019, the band played at numerous shows and festivals in Europe, Asia and South America.

=== Survive and upcoming seventeenth studio album (2021–present) ===
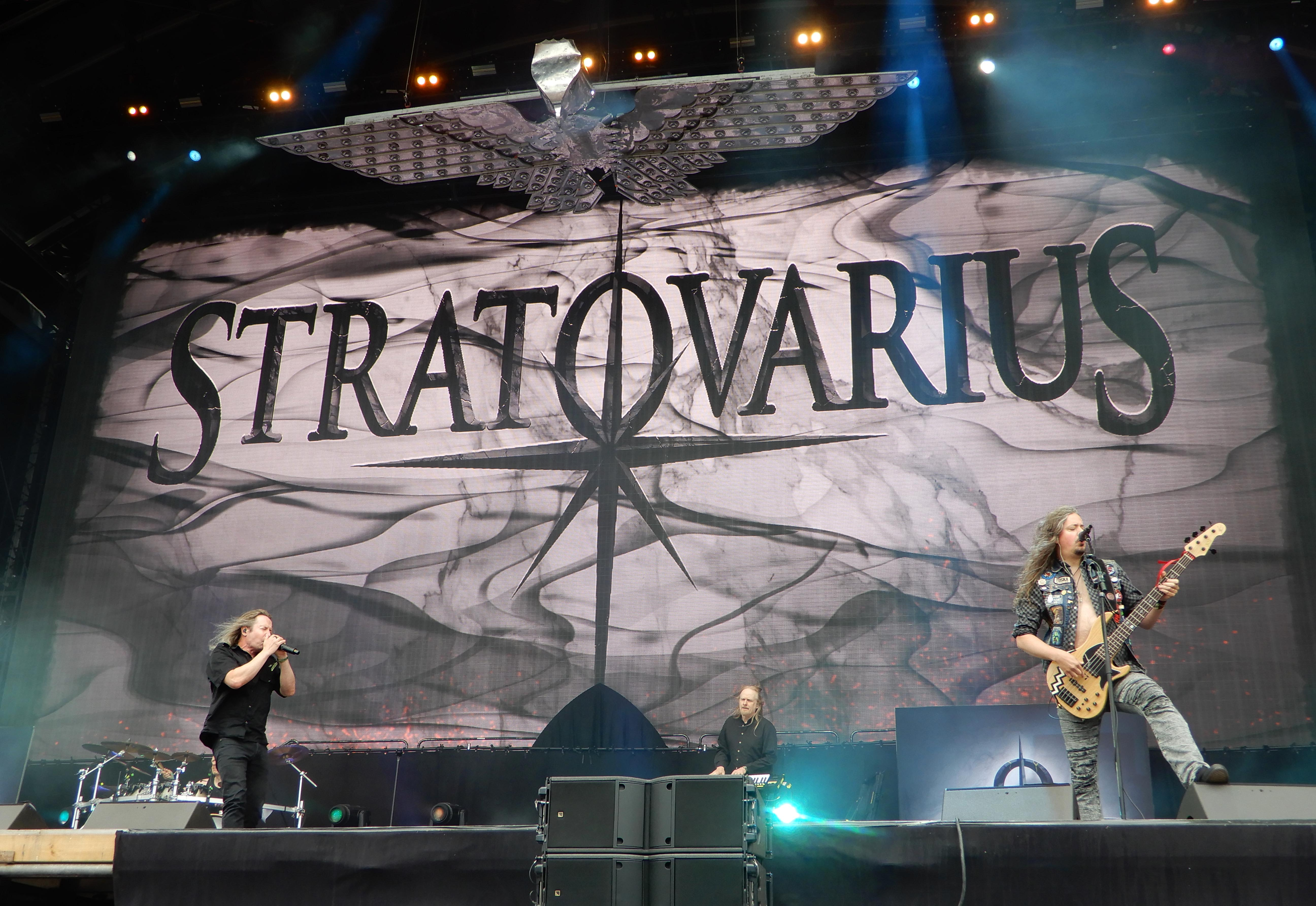
Stratovarius at Hellfest in 2024

By September 2021, Stratovarius had been tracking their new album at Kotipelto's studio. The new album, Survive, was released on 23 September 2022. The album became the bands 4th to top the Finnish Album Charts and was met with critical acclaim, being nominated for metal album of the year at the 2022 Emma gaalas along with Metal Hammer putting Survive at number 7 on their list of "The 10 best power metal albums of 2022." They supported the album with a European tour along with a few shows in the U.S.

In 2023, the band continued touring in both Europe and Latin America. During the Fall they went on the Nordic Power Metal Titans Tour alongside Sonata Arctica. In 2024, they played select shows and festivals in Europe and have continued into 2025, also going on a second Nordic Power Metal Titans Tour with Sonata Arctica.

In October 2025, Kotipelto confirmed that Stratovarius has been working on new material for their seventeenth studio album, in hopes of having it released in 2026 or 2027 rather than repeating the seven-year gap between Eternal and Survive. The group will be touring Finland in the Summer of 2026, along with China and South America later in the year. On September 5, the group were one of metal bands selected to perform at Yle’s 100th anniversary concert broadcast.

== Musical style ==
Stratovarius is primarily described as a melodic power metal band and one of the most influential groups of the genre, also encompassing other genres, such as neoclassical metal, and symphonic metal. Lead singer Timo Kotipelto is known for his powerful quasi-operatic singing style and emotional delivery.

Bass player Lauri Porra commented on the band's influences stating:

We are different people and we like a lot of different stuff. You can hear some influences of older bands such as Deep Purple or Rainbow but Stratovarius has always been adding musical influences from all around for instance classical music, modern metal, Finnish Schlager music and film music. Influences can be found everywhere.

Additionally Timo Tolkki, former guitarist and lead songwriter for Stratovarius, has cited Helloween as his biggest influence, in addition to drawing inspiration from the virtuosity of Swedish guitarist Yngwie Malmsteen.

=== Lyrical themes ===
Many Stratovarius songs are uplifting anthems of personal growth, inner strength, and triumph over adversity. An example of this is "Eagleheart", which is a motivational anthem about perseverance and courage.

They also touch upon spirituality and destiny with the song "Infinity" describing a transcendental journey through time and space. Finally, the band also touches upon political issues such as war and environmental protection which can be seen in the song "Paradise".

== Legacy ==
Stratovarius is often grouped with Helloween, Blind Guardian, and Rhapsody of Fire as foundational acts, forming part of the "Big Four" of European power metal. Stratovarius has been very influential on the genre showing that power metal could be not just fast and aggressive, but also emotionally rich, with complex arrangements, musical virtuosity, and lyrical themes beyond just fantasy or battles. Despite lineup changes, the band has remained relevant for over 35 years, as well as continuing to release new music (Survive in 2022) and headline festivals. Albums such as Episode, Visions, Destiny, and Infinite all pushed the boundaries of power metal with new arrangements, intricate solos, and emotional depth, and are considered power metal classics by fans and critics. Visions is viewed as a turning point for the Finnish power metal scene and a reference point for many emerging bands. In 2017, Loudwire placed the album in its top 10 power metal albums of all time. In 2019 Metal Hammer named Destiny the 7th best power metal album of all time.

The band has topped the Finnish charts multiple times and have sold over 4 Million records worldwide with album Infinite was certified Platinum in June 2013, with 21,907 copies sold. The group is seen as one of the most successful and influential bands to come out of Finland.

Bands such as Sonata Arctica, DragonForce, Galneryus, Balflare, Nightwish, Heavenly, Seven Thorns, Crystallion, Phoenix Rising, Children of Bodom, Wintersun, Unlucky Morpheus, Twilight Force and Majestica have all credited Stratovarius as an influence.

== Band members ==
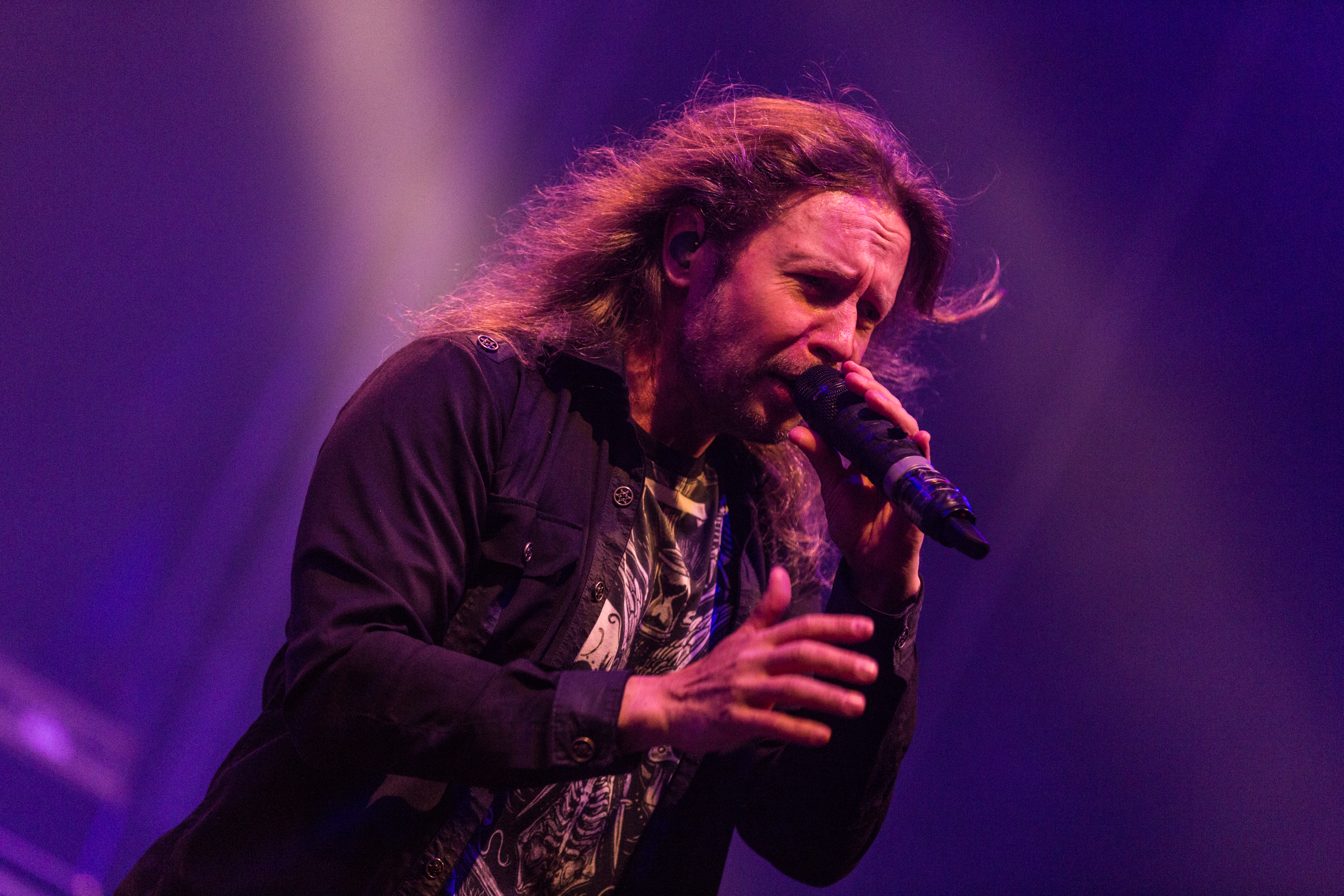
Timo Kotipelto

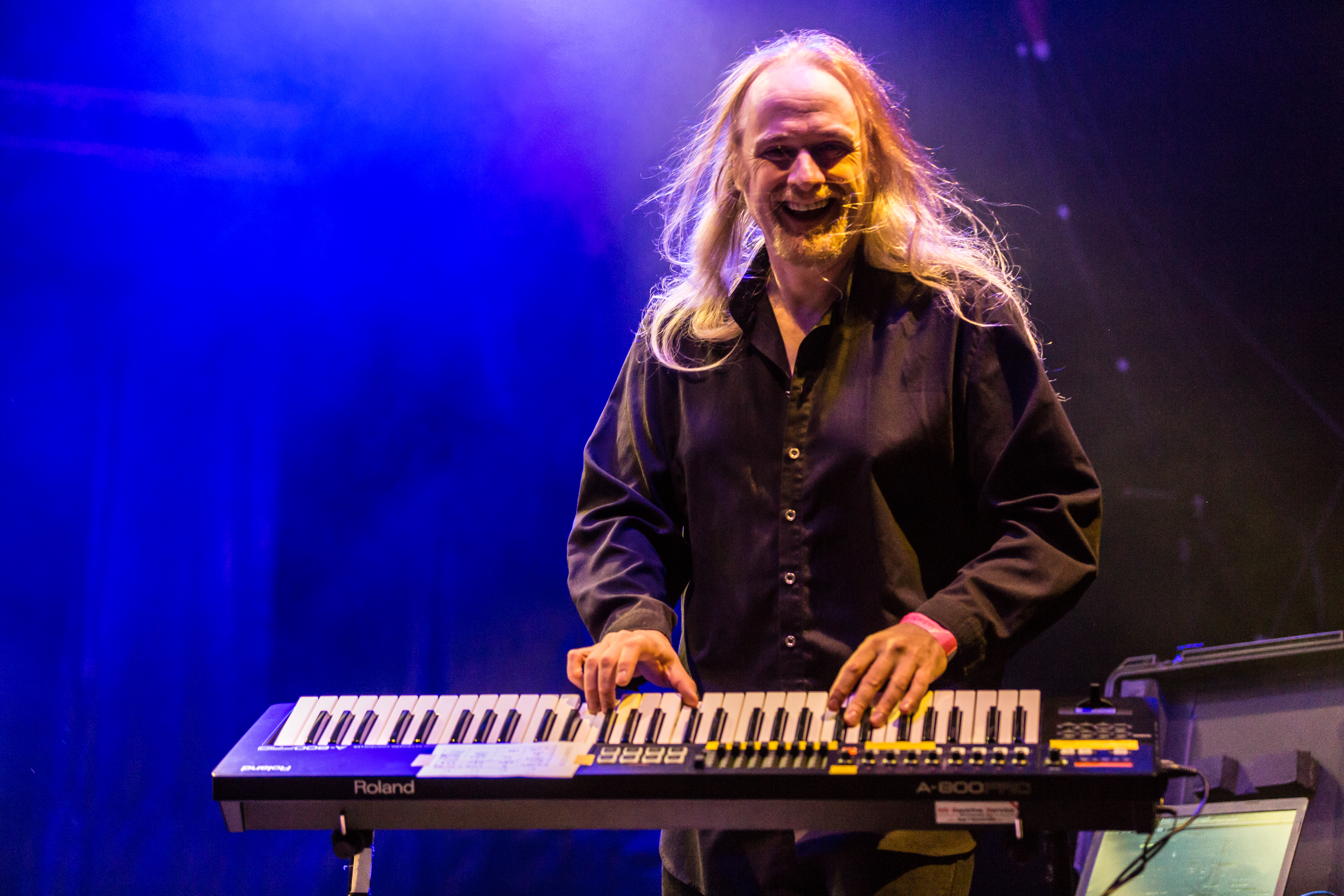
Jens Johansson

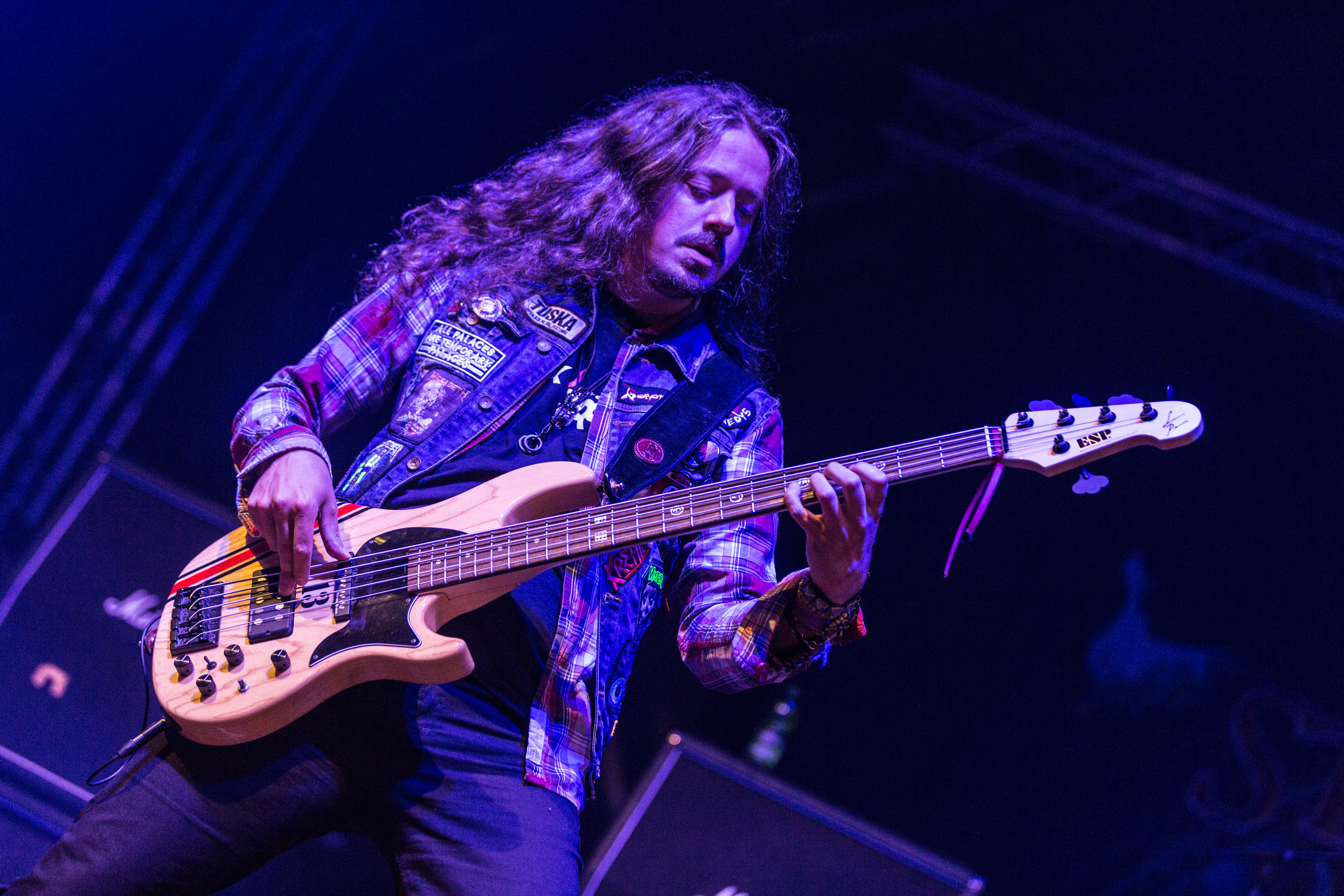
Lauri Porra

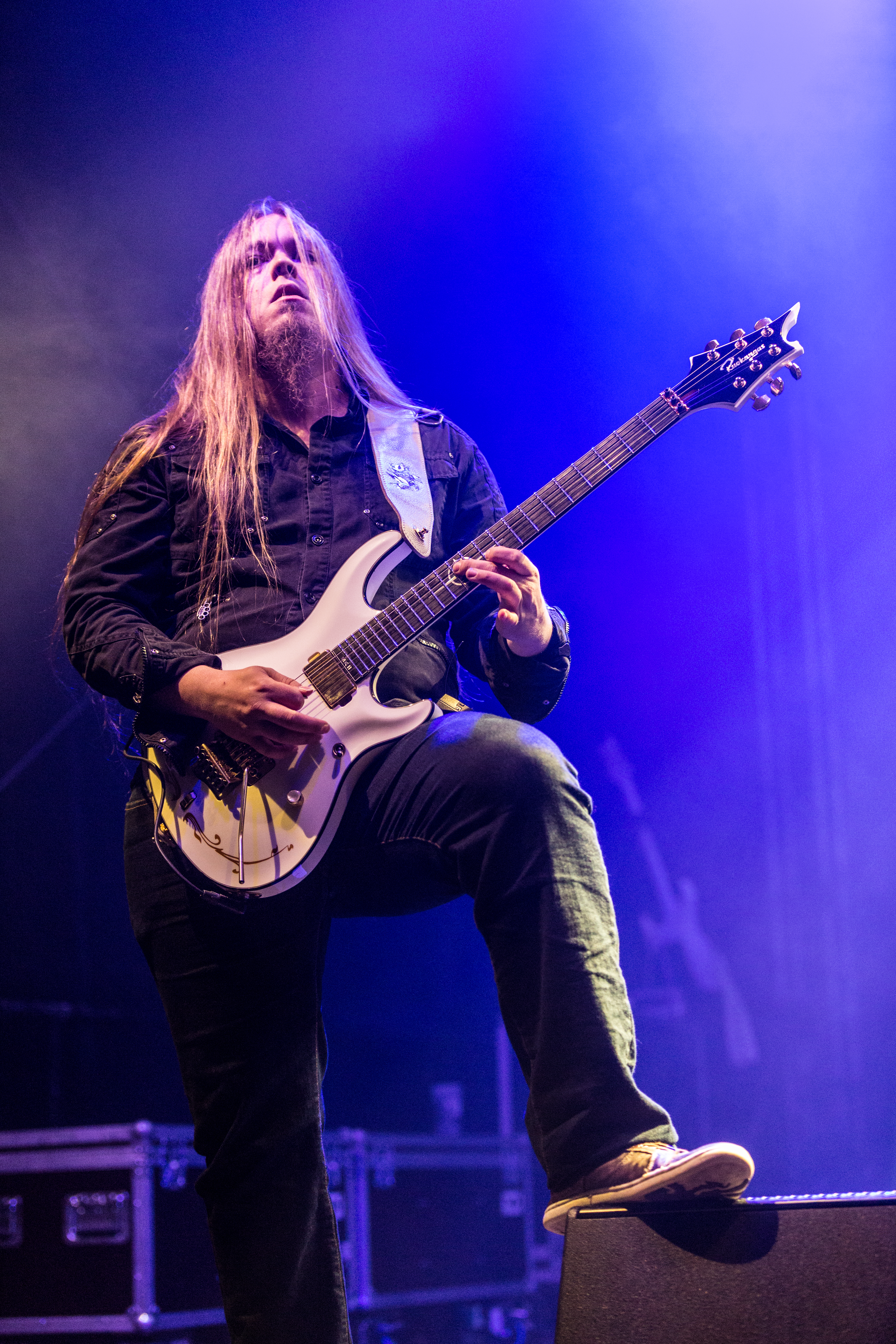
Matias Kupiainen

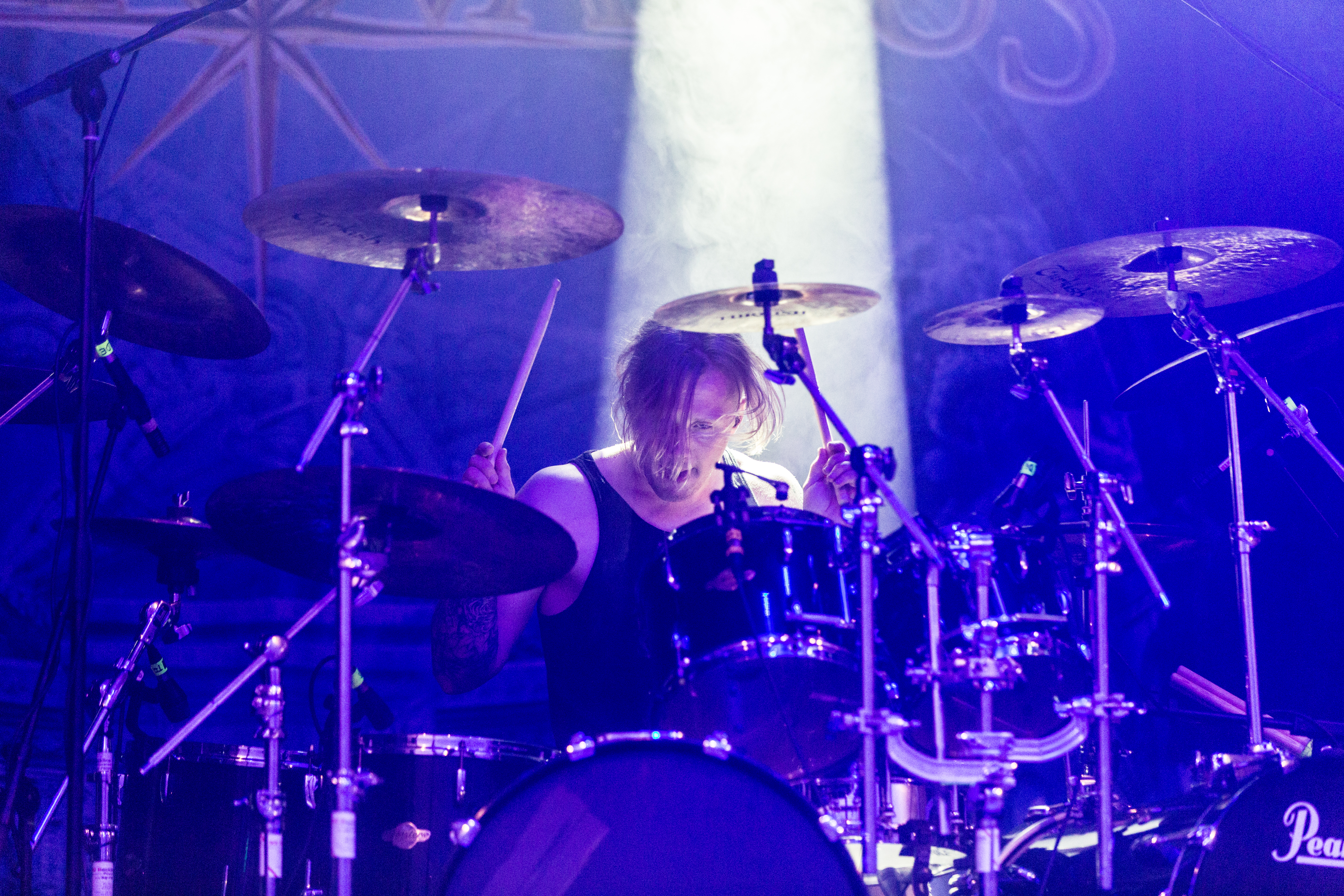
Rolf Pilve

Current

- Timo Kotipelto – lead vocals (1994–present)
- Jens Johansson – keyboards (1995–present)
- Lauri Porra – bass, backing vocals (2005–present)
- Matias Kupiainen – guitar, backing vocals (2008–present)
- Rolf Pilve – drums (2012–present)

Former

- Tuomo Lassila – drums (1982–1995), lead vocals (1982–1985)
- Mika Ervaskari – keyboards (1984–1987, died 2005)
- Staffan Stråhlman – guitar (1982–1984)
- John Vihervä – bass (1982–1984)
- Timo Tolkki – guitar (1984–2008), lead vocals (1984–1994), backing vocals (1994–2008)
- Jyrki Lentonen – bass (1984–1990)
- Antti Ikonen – keyboards (1988–1995)
- Jari Behm – bass (1990–1993)
- Jari Kainulainen – bass (1993–2005)
- Jörg Michael – drums (1995–2012)

Former session musicians

- Sami Kuoppamäki – drums (1993–1994)
- Anders Johansson – drums (2004; live substitute for Jörg Michael)
- Alex Landenburg – drums (2010; live substitute for Jörg Michael)

== Discography ==
Studio albums

- Fright Night (1989)
- Twilight Time (1992)
- Dreamspace (1994)
- Fourth Dimension (1995)
- Episode (1996)
- Visions (1997)
- Destiny (1998)
- Infinite (2000)
- Elements Pt. 1 (2003)
- Elements Pt. 2 (2003)
- Stratovarius (2005)
- Polaris (2009)
- Elysium (2011)
- Nemesis (2013)
- Eternal (2015)
- Survive (2022)

== Award and nominations ==
Emma Gaala

Year	Nominee / work	Award	Result
1998	Stratovarius	Export Artist of the Year	Won
2022	Survive	Metal Album of the Year	Nominated

Metal Storm Awards

Year	Nominee / work	Award	Result
2009	Polaris	Power Metal Album of the Year	Nominated
2011	Elysium	Power Metal Album of the Year	Nominated
2013	Nemesis	Power Metal Album of the Year	Won
2015	Eternal	Power Metal Album of the Year	Nominated
2022	Survive	Power Metal Album of the Year	Nominated

Finnish Metal Awards

Year	Nominee / work	Award	Result
2011	Stratovarius	Band of the Year	Nominated
2011	Elysium	Album of the Year	Nominated
2011	Timo Kotipelto	Vocalist of the Year	Nominated

SFP Awards

Year	Nominee / work	Award	Result
1998	"S.O.S."	Best Domestic Video of the Year	Won
1999	Stratovarius	Metal Band of the Year	Won

Soundi Awards

Year	Nominee / work	Award	Result
1998	Timo Tolkki	Best Musician	Won
1999	Timo Tolkki	Best Musician	Won
1999	Stratovarius	Act of the Year	Nominated
1999	Timo Kotipelto	Singer of the Year	Nominated
1999	Destiny	Album of the Year	Nominated
1999	"S.O.S."	Video of the Year	Nominated
