= Nemesis (Stratovarius album) =

Studio album by Stratovarius
- Released: 22 February 2013
- Recorded: August–October 2012 at 5 by 5 Audio in Pitäjänmäki, Helsinki, Finland
- Genre: Power metal; symphonic metal
- Length: 57:39
- Label: Edel
- Producer: Matias Kupiainen

Stratovarius chronology
| Elysium (2011) | Nemesis (2013) | Eternal (2015) |

Alternative cover
- Alternate cover included in Japan edition

Singles from Nemesis
- 1. "Unbreakable" Released: January 25, 2013

Nemesis is the fourteenth studio album by power metal band Stratovarius, released on 22 February 2013 through Edel AG. It is the first Stratovarius album to feature new drummer Rolf Pilve, who replaced Jörg Michael in 2012. The album was first announced on the band's official website on 24 November 2012, with the track listing being revealed on 5 December 2012. Nemesis reached No. 3 on the Finnish albums chart. A preview of "Unbreakable", the album's first single, was made available on YouTube and was released on 25 January 2013.

== Background and recording ==
Former Sonata Arctica guitarist Jani Liimatainen, who released the collaborative acoustic album Blackoustic in 2012 with singer Timo Kotipelto, guest performs on Nemesis, having also co-written two songs in "If the Story Is Over" and "Out of the Fog".

The band considered hiring an orchestra to perform in the album, but they abandoned the idea in the end.

The name of the album came up when guitarist Matias was sitting on the airport of Madrid and suggested it to his bandmates. At that point, most of the lyrics were already done. The woman on the cover may be a savior, an avenger or the author of all the destruction, according to Jens.

== Track listing ==
| No. | Title | Lyrics | Music | Length |
|---|---|---|---|---|
| 1. | "Abandon" | Timo Kotipelto | Matias Kupiainen | 4:51 |
| 2. | "Unbreakable" | Kupiainen, Kotipelto | Kupiainen | 4:37 |
| 3. | "Stand My Ground" | Kupiainen, Kotipelto | Kupiainen | 4:14 |
| 4. | "Halcyon Days" | Kotipelto | Kupiainen | 5:29 |
| 5. | "Fantasy" | Lauri Porra | Porra | 4:19 |
| 6. | "Out of the Fog" | Kotipelto, Jani Liimatainen | Kotipelto, Liimatainen, Kupiainen | 6:58 |
| 7. | "Castles in the Air" | Jens Johansson | Johansson | 6:02 |
| 8. | "Dragons" | Johansson | Johansson | 4:04 |
| 9. | "One Must Fall" | Kupiainen | Kupiainen | 4:27 |
| 10. | "If the Story Is Over" | Liimatainen | Liimatainen, Kotipelto | 6:06 |
| 11. | "Nemesis" | Kotipelto | Kupiainen | 6:33 |
| Total length: | | | | 57:40 |

Limited edition bonus tracks
| No. | Title | Lyrics | Music | Length |
|---|---|---|---|---|
| 12. | "Fireborn" | Porra | Porra | 4:45 |
| 13. | "Hunter" | Kotipelto, Perttu Vänskä | Kupiainen | 3:27 |

Japanese edition bonus track (Japan version also includes "Fireborn" and "Hunter")
| No. | Title | Lyrics | Music | Length |
|---|---|---|---|---|
| 14. | "Kill It with Fire" | Johansson | Johansson | 4:52 |

Limited vinyl edition bonus track
| No. | Title | Lyrics | Music | Length |
|---|---|---|---|---|
| 15. | "Old Man and the Sea" | Porra | Porra | 4:11 |

== Critical reception ==
Professional ratings
Review scores
| Source | Rating |
|---|---|
| About.com | 4/5 stars |
| AllMusic | 3/5 stars |
| BW&BK | 8.5/10 |
| Metal Storm | 8.2/10.0 |
| Metal Hammer | 4/5 stars |

LA Weekly named its cover as the most ridiculous metal album cover of 2013.

As for the album itself, it received generally positive reviews from critics, Metal Storm wrote “Even after all their previous dramas Stratovarius have made Nemesis their most expressive return to form.”

James Monger writing for AllMusic wrote “Nemesis delivers musically what it does visually, offering up 11 well-honed slabs of propulsive, stadium-ready, non-specific adversity anthems,” “resulting in another riveting, ludicrous, ornate, hammy, and explosive set from one of the genre's finest practitioners.”

The album won best Power Metal album at the 2013 Metalstorm awards.

== Personnel ==
=== Stratovarius ===
- Timo Kotipelto – vocals
- Matias Kupiainen – guitar, mixing, production
- Jens Johansson – keyboard
- Rolf Pilve – drums
- Lauri Porra – bass

=== Guest musicians ===
- Jani Liimatainen – acoustic guitar, background vocals
- Joakin Jokela – whistling
- background vocals by the "Shark Finns" – Susana Koski, Anna Maria Parkkinen, Anna-Maija Jalkenen, Alexa Leroux, Tipe Johnson, Hepa Waara, Ari Sievälä, James Lascelles, Dane Stefaniuk, Koop Arponen

=== Production ===
- Mika Jussila – mastering
- Perttu Vänskä – production assistance
- Kalle Keski-Orvola – production assistance
- Paavo Kurkela – production assistance
- Gyula Havancsák – cover art
- Sander Nebeling – layout and package coordination

== Charts ==
| Chart (2013) | Peak position |
|---|---|
| Austrian Albums (Ö3 Austria) | 62 |
| Belgian Albums (Ultratop Flanders) | 136 |
| Belgian Albums (Ultratop Wallonia) | 59 |
| Finnish Albums (Suomen virallinen lista) | 3 |
| French Albums (SNEP) | 82 |
| German Albums (Offizielle Top 100) | 41 |
| Japanese Albums (Oricon) | 37 |
| Spanish Albums (Promusicae) | 32 |
| Swedish Albums (Sverigetopplistan) | 44 |
| Swiss Albums (Schweizer Hitparade) | 30 |
| US Heatseekers Albums (Billboard) | 16 |
