= Intermission (Stratovarius album) =

Compilation album by Stratovarius
- Released: 26 June 2001
- Recorded: 1996–2001 at Finnvox Studios, Tavastia Club, "luxurious apartments on Helsinginkatu" in Helsinki; Crownhill Studio in Düsseldorf; Hästfittan Estate; "hotel rooms all over the world"
- Genre: Power metal, heavy metal
- Length: 67:21
- Label: Nuclear Blast
- Producer: Timo Tolkki

Stratovarius chronology
| Infinite (2000) | Intermission (2001) | Elements Pt. 1 (2003) |

Intermission is a compilation album by power metal band Stratovarius, released on 26 June 2001 through Nuclear Blast. The album consists of covers, live and bonus tracks, as well as four new tracks. It charted in the top 100 in four countries.

== Critical reception ==
Professional ratings
Review scores
| Source | Rating |
|---|---|
| AllMusic | 3/5 stars |

Antti J. Ravelin at AllMusic gave Intermission three stars out of five, calling it "just an attempt to please fans and to postpone the making of their next studio album", but that "oddly enough, Intermission succeeds to offer a very album-like (a strong and steady whole) compilation."

== Track listing ==
| No. | Title | Lyrics | Music | Notes | Length |
|---|---|---|---|---|---|
| 1. | "Will My Soul Ever Rest in Peace?" | Timo Tolkki | Tolkki | Previously unreleased | 4:56 |
| 2. | "Falling into Fantasy" | Timo Kotipelto | Tolkki | Previously unreleased | 5:13 |
| 3. | "The Curtains Are Falling" | Jens Johansson | Johansson | Previously unreleased | 4:25 |
| 4. | "Requiem" | Tolkki | Tolkki | Previously unreleased | 2:54 |
| 5. | "Bloodstone" | K.K. Downing, Rob Halford, Glenn Tipton | Downing, Halford, Tipton | Judas Priest cover; previously released on A Tribute to Judas Priest: Legends of Metal | 3:54 |
| 6. | "Kill the King" | Ronnie James Dio | Ritchie Blackmore, Dio, Cozy Powell | Rainbow cover; "Father Time" B-side | 4:36 |
| 7. | "I Surrender" | Russ Ballard | Ballard | Rainbow live cover; previously unreleased | 3:47 |
| 8. | "Keep the Flame" | Johansson | Johansson | Infinite French edition bonus track | 2:47 |
| 9. | "Why Are We Here?" | Johansson | Johansson | Infinite box set edition bonus track | 4:43 |
| 10. | "What Can I Say" | Kotipelto | Kotipelto | Infinite Japanese edition bonus track | 5:12 |
| 11. | "Dream with Me" | Kotipelto | Kotipelto | Destiny Japanese edition bonus track | 5:13 |
| 12. | "When the Night Meets the Day" | Tolkki | Tolkki | Episode Japanese edition bonus track | 5:26 |
| 13. | "It's a Mystery" | Kotipelto | Tolkki | Infinite box set edition bonus track | 4:04 |
| 14. | "Cold Winter Nights" | Kotipelto | Tolkki | Destiny European edition bonus track | 5:14 |
| 15. | "Hunting High & Low" | Kotipelto | Tolkki | Live | 4:57 |
| Total length: | | | | | 67:21 |

Special edition bonus track
| No. | Title | Lyrics | Music | Notes | Length |
|---|---|---|---|---|---|
| 16. | "Blackout" | Klaus Meine, Herman Rarebell, Sonja Kittelsen | Rudolf Schenker | Scorpions cover; SOS B-side | 4:08 |

Limited edition bonus tracks
| No. | Title | Lyrics | Music | Length |
|---|---|---|---|---|
| 16. | "Freedom" (demo) | Tolkki | Tolkki | 5:10 |
| 17. | "Neon Light Child" (demo) | Tolkki | Tolkki | 4:52 |

== Personnel ==
- Timo Kotipelto – lead vocals (except track 6)
- Timo Tolkki – lead vocals (track 6), guitar, record producer
- Jens Johansson – keyboards
- Jörg Michael – drums
- Jari Kainulainen – bass guitar
- Kimmo – background vocals
- Marko – background vocals
- Pasi – background vocals
- Anssi – background vocals
- Mikko Karmila – engineering (except track 12), mixing
- T. T. Oksala – engineering (track 12)
- Mika Jussila – mastering

== Charts ==
| Chart (2001) | Peak position |
|---|---|
| Finnish Albums (Suomen virallinen lista) | 7 |
| French Albums (SNEP) | 97 |
| German Albums (Offizielle Top 100) | 73 |
| Swiss Albums (Schweizer Hitparade) | 85 |
