= Episode (Stratovarius album) =

Studio album by Stratovarius
- Released: 22 April 1996
- Recorded: October 1995 – February 1996
- Studio: Finnvox Studios, Helsinki
- Genre: Power metal, neoclassical metal
- Length: 62:56
- Label: Noise
- Producer: Timo Tolkki

Stratovarius chronology
Fourth Dimension (1995)	Episode (1996)	Visions (1997)

Singles from Episode
- 1. "Father Time" / "Uncertainty" Released: 1996; 2. "Will the Sun Rise?" Released: 1996

Episode is the fifth studio album by power metal band Stratovarius, released on 22 April 1996 through Noise Records. It is the first Stratovarius album to feature keyboardist Jens Johansson and drummer Jörg Michael, both of whom would form part of the band's most stable line-up for a decade. The album reached No. 21 on the Finnish albums chart and remained on that chart for six weeks.

The album blends heavy, fast-paced songs like "Father Time" with slower tracks and features the memorable "Sibelius String Orchestra" for added atmospheric depth. It is viewed as a high point for the band and features more complex song writing.

== Critical reception ==
The album has received high praise and is considered a classic of melodic speed metal, praised for its intricate instrumental work, Timo Kotipelto's powerful vocals, and the incorporation of classical elements like string orchestras. Antti J. Ravelin writing for AllMusic wrote “Episode is indeed a big step for Stratovarius. It's the album on which they finally reached the sound that would last for years. Larry Griffin writing for Metalcrypt gave the album a perfect score calming “with a lot of innovation that the genre hadn't seen since the glory days of Queensryche and Crimson Glory in the 80s and a songwriting talent great enough to shatter a supernova. This is Stratovarius' best album by far, with even the weaker songs having merit to them and generally being extremely well written.

Professional ratings
Review scores
Source	Rating
AllMusic	3/5 stars
Metalcrypt.com	5/5
Theheadbangingmoose.com	4.5/5 stars
Ultimate Guitar	10/10

== Track listing ==
No.	Title	Lyrics	Music	Length
1.	"Father Time"	Timo Kotipelto, Richard Johnson	Timo Tolkki	5:01
2.	"Will the Sun Rise?"	Kotipelto	Tolkki	5:06
3.	"Eternity"	Kotipelto	Tolkki	6:55
4.	"Episode"	(instrumental)	Tolkki	2:01
5.	"Speed of Light"	Kotipelto	Tolkki	3:03
6.	"Uncertainty"	Kotipelto	Kotipelto	5:59
7.	"Season of Change"	Tolkki	Tolkki	6:56
8.	"Stratosphere"	(instrumental)	Tolkki	4:51
9.	"Babylon"	Tolkki	Tolkki	7:09
10.	"Tomorrow"	Johnson	Tolkki	4:51
11.	"Night Time Eclipse"	Kotipelto	Tolkki	7:58
12.	"Forever"	Tolkki	Tolkki	3:06
Total length:				62:56

Japanese edition bonus track
No.	Title	Lyrics	Music	Length
13.	"When the Night Meets the Day"	Tolkki	Tolkki	5:30

2002 Japanese reissue bonus track
No.	Title	Lyrics	Music	Length
14.	"Future Shock '96"	Tuomo Lassila, Tolkki	Lassila, Tolkki	4:27

== Personnel ==
- Timo Kotipelto – lead vocals
- Timo Tolkki – guitar, background vocals, arrangement (except track 12), engineering, mixing, production
- Jens Johansson – keyboards
- Jörg Michael – drums
- Jari Kainulainen – bass guitar
- Pasi Puolakka – flute
- Sibelius String Orchestra – strings
- Sibelius Choir – choir
- Pop/Jazz Conservatory Choir – choir
- Reijo Harvonen – conducting, arrangement (track 12)
- Kimmo Blom – background vocals
- Richard Johnson – background vocals
- Marko Vaara – background vocals
- Richard Johnson – vocal consultation, lyrical consultation
- Timo Oksala – engineering
- Rene Siren – engineering
- Erol Sakir – tape operation
- Mikko Karmila – mixing
- Mika Jussila – mastering

== Charts ==
Chart (1996)	Peak position
Finnish Albums (Suomen virallinen lista)	21
Japanese Albums (Oricon)	20
