= Fourth Dimension (Stratovarius album) =

Studio album by Stratovarius
- Released: 11 March 1995
- Recorded: June–October 1994
- Studio: Soundtrack Studios, Helsinki
- Genre: Power metal; heavy metal
- Length: 59:20
- Label: Noise
- Producer: Timo Tolkki

Stratovarius chronology
Dreamspace (1994)	Fourth Dimension (1995)	Episode (1996)

Singles from Fourth Dimension
- 1. "Against the Wind" Released: 1995

Fourth Dimension is the fourth studio album by power metal band Stratovarius, released on 11 March 1995 through Noise Records. The album is the band's first to feature vocalist Timo Kotipelto as well as the last with keyboardist Antti Ikonen and drummer Tuomo Lassila, thus being the last Stratovarius album to date featuring an all-Finnish line-up.

Founding member and guitarist Timo Tolkki, who had served as the band's vocalist for their first three albums, made the decision to leave the vocals to Timo Kotipelto who the band had already known some time before. Tolkki still provided background vocals on Fourth Dimension before handing over lead singing duties to Kotipelto for all subsequent albums. The track "030366" is likely a reference to Tolkki's birthday of 3 March 1966. The album seen Stratovarius take off both commercially and artistically. As they redefined its style, with a mix between melody, speed and technical guitar passages.

For a couple of months, the recording sessions for this album ran parallel and in the same studio as Tolkki's then-upcoming solo studio album Classical Variations and Themes. In said album, Lassila and Ikonen also provided drums and keyboards, respectively.

== Critical reception ==
Professional ratings
Review scores
Source	Rating
AllMusic	4/5 stars
Music Waves	4/5

Steve Huey at AllMusic described Fourth Dimension as "melodic Euro-metal" and picking up where Dreamspace (1994) left off. He recommended it for fans of Judas Priest, Scorpions and other similar heavy metal bands.

== Track listing ==
All music is composed by Timo Tolkki.

No.	Title	Lyrics	Length
1.	"Against the Wind"	Tolkki, Timo Kotipelto	3:48
2.	"Distant Skies"	Tolkki	4:10
3.	"Galaxies"	Tolkki, Kotipelto	5:00
4.	"Winter"	Tolkki	6:32
5.	"Stratovarius"	(instrumental)	6:22
6.	"Lord of the Wasteland"	Tolkki	6:11
7.	"030366"	Tolkki	5:46
8.	"Nightfall"	Tolkki, Tuomo Lassila	5:09
9.	"We Hold the Key"	Tolkki, Kotipelto	7:53
10.	"Twilight Symphony"	Tolkki	6:59
11.	"Call of the Wilderness"	(instrumental)	1:30
Total length:			59:20

Japanese edition/2003 reissue bonus track
No.	Title	Lyrics	Length
12.	"Dreamspace" (live)	Tolkki	6:16

== Personnel ==
- Timo Kotipelto – lead vocals, background vocals
- Timo Tolkki – guitar, background vocals, engineering, mixing, record producer
- Antti Ikonen – keyboards
- Tuomo Lassila – drums, arrangement (track 10)
- Jari Kainulainen – bass guitar
- Marko Vaara – background vocals
- Kimmo Blom – background vocals
- Kimmo Tullila – strings (track 10)
- Marika Bister – strings (track 10)
- Petteri Poljärvi – strings (track 10)
- Antero Manninen – strings (track 10)
- Mika Jussila – mastering

== Charts ==
Chart (1995)	Peak position
Finnish Albums (The Official Finnish Charts)	33
Japanese Albums (Oricon)	26
