= Visions (Stratovarius album) =

Studio album by Stratovarius
- Released: 28 April 1997
- Recorded: October 1996 – February 1997
- Studios: Finnvox Studios, Helsinki
- Genres: Power metal; neoclassical metal
- Length: 61:01
- Label: Noise
- Producer: Timo Tolkki

Stratovarius chronology
Episode (1996)	Visions (1997)	Destiny (1998)

Singles from Visions
- 1. "The Kiss of Judas" Released: 1997; 2. "Black Diamond" Released: 1997

Visions is the sixth studio album by Finnish power metal band Stratovarius, released on 28 April 1997 through Noise Records. The album reached No. 4 on the Finnish albums chart and remained on that chart for 23 weeks. It is a concept album about Nostradamus.

The album is viewed as a turning point for the Finnish power metal scene and a reference point for many emerging bands of the time.

== Critical reception ==
Professional ratings
Review scores
Source	Rating
AllMusic	4/5 stars
Rock Hard	9.5/10
Metalcrypt.com	4.5/5 stars

Steve Huey at AllMusic gave Visions four stars out of five, calling it "as ambitious as neoclassical metal gets" and saying "there are some fine moments on the record", but also remarking that "too much of the material sinks under its own weight, particularly the ten-minute title track."

In 2005, the album was ranked No. 297 in Rock Hard magazine's book The 500 Greatest Rock & Metal Albums of All Time.

In 2016 Metal Hammer named the album in their list of "The 10 essential power metal albums." Stating “Visions is simply a classic power metal record: preposterous, slick, immaculate and bursting with killer tunes."

In 2017 Loudwire named the album at sixth in their list "Top 25 Power Metal Albums of All Time."

== Track listing ==
All music is composed by Timo Tolkki, except where noted.

No.	Title	Lyrics	Length
1.	"The Kiss of Judas"	Timo Kotipelto	5:49
2.	"Black Diamond"	Kotipelto	5:39
3.	"Forever Free"	Kotipelto	6:00
4.	"Before the Winter"	Tolkki	6:07
5.	"Legions"	Tolkki	5:43
6.	"The Abyss of Your Eyes"	Kotipelto	5:38
7.	"Holy Light"	(instrumental)	5:45
8.	"Paradise"	Tolkki	4:27
9.	"Coming Home"	Tolkki	5:36
10.	"Visions (Southern Cross)"	Tolkki	10:17
Total length:			61:01

Japanese edition bonus tracks
No.	Title	Lyrics	Length
11.	"Black Diamond" (demo)	Kotipelto	5:07
12.	"Uncertainty" (live; music by Kotipelto)	Kotipelto	6:13

Japanese 2002 reissue bonus track
No.	Title	Lyrics	Length
13.	"4th Reich" (live)	Tolkki	5:44

== Personnel ==
- Timo Kotipelto – lead vocals
- Timo Tolkki – guitar, background vocals, mastering, production
- Jens Johansson – keyboards, harpsichord
- Jörg Michael – drums
- Jari Kainulainen – bass guitar
- Kimmo Blom – background vocals
- Marko Vaara – background vocals
- Richard Johnson – background vocals, lyrical consultation
- James M. Johnson – spoken vocals
- Mikko Karmila – engineering, mixing
- Pauli Saastamoinen – mastering

== Charts ==
Chart (1997)	Peak position
Finnish Albums (Suomen virallinen lista)	4
Japanese Albums (Oricon)	18

== Certifications ==
Region	Certification	Certified units/sales
Finland (Musiikkituottajat)	Gold	20,000
