= Destiny (Stratovarius album) =

Studio album by Stratovarius
- Released: 5 October 1998
- Recorded: April–July 1998
- Studio: Finnvox Studios, Helsinki
- Genre: Power metal; neoclassical metal
- Length: 53:43
- Label: Noise
- Producer: Timo Tolkki

Stratovarius chronology
Visions (1997)	Destiny (1998)	Infinite (2000)

Singles from Destiny
- 1. "SOS" / "No Turning Back" / "Years Go By" Released: 17 August 1998

Destiny is the seventh studio album by power metal band Stratovarius, released on 5 October 1998 through Noise Records. It reached No. 1 on the Finnish albums chart and remained on that chart for 17 weeks. "SOS" was released as a single, reaching No. 2 on the Finnish singles chart and remaining on that chart for eleven weeks.

In 2016 the band released a reissue with enhanced album artwork and additional bonus tracks

In 2019, Metal Hammer ranked it as the 7th best power metal album of all time.

== Reception ==
The album received positive reception with Metal Hammer writing “Destiny, was the culmination of this Finnish quintet’s first decade of wizardly development, bringing their sharpest skills to bear on a set of sweet pop-metal nuggets, killer trad Euro-bangers, impassioned power ballads and dizzying progressive epics. Metal Music Archives stated “Destiny is one of their most solid, consistent and tasteful albums. It’s a great example of the band’s style and its full to the brim with catchy choruses, entertaining and flashy musicianship.

Professional ratings
Review scores
Source	Rating
AllMusic	3/5 stars
Metal-rules.com	4/5
Metal Music Archives	4/5 stars
Ultimate Guitar	7/10

== Track listing ==
All music is composed by Timo Tolkki, except where noted.

No.	Title	Lyrics	Length
1.	"Destiny"	Timo Tolkki	10:15
2.	"S.O.S."	Tolkki, Timo Kotipelto	4:15
3.	"No Turning Back"	Kotipelto	4:22
4.	"4000 Rainy Nights"	Tolkki	6:00
5.	"Rebel"	Tolkki	4:16
6.	"Years Go By"	Tolkki	5:14
7.	"Playing with Fire"	Kotipelto	4:15
8.	"Venus in the Morning"	Tolkki	5:35
9.	"Anthem of the World"	Tolkki	9:31
Total length:			53:43

European edition bonus track
No.	Title	Lyrics	Length
10.	"Cold Winter Nights"	Kotipelto	5:12

Japanese edition bonus track
No.	Title	Lyrics	Music	Length
10.	"Dream with Me"	Kotipelto	Kotipelto	5:13

United States edition bonus track
No.	Title	Lyrics	Music	Length
10.	"Blackout" (Scorpions cover)	Klaus Meine, Herman Rarebell, Sonja Kittelsen	Rudolf Schenker	4:08

2016 remastered version, included all bonus tracks and live album Visions of Destiny released by Edel SE & Co. KGaA under the label earMusic on October 28, 2016.

== Personnel ==
- Timo Kotipelto – vocals
- Timo Tolkki – guitar, engineering, production
- Jens Johansson – keyboards
- Jörg Michael – drums
- Jari Kainulainen – bass guitar
- Max Savikangas – strings
- Eicca Toppinen – strings
- Sanna Salmenkallio – strings
- "Mr. Unknown" – strings
- Cantores Minores – choir
- Timo Ojala – conducting
- Mikko Karmila – engineering, mixing
- Mika Jussila – mastering
- Pauli Saastamoinen – mastering

== Charts ==
Chart (1998)	Peak position
Finnish Albums (Suomen virallinen lista)	1
German Albums (Offizielle Top 100)	89
Japanese Albums (Oricon)	31

== Certifications ==
Region	Certification	Certified units/sales
Finland (Musiikkituottajat)	Gold	20,000

== See also ==
- List of number-one albums (Finland)
