= 2013 in heavy metal music =

This is a timeline documenting the events of heavy metal in the year 2013.

== Bands disbanded ==
- Ava Inferi
- Cataract
- Kiuas
- The Chariot
- Forbidden
- Gaza
- God Forbid
- Inhale Exhale
- Nachtmystium
- Power Quest
- Static-X
- Vomitory
- Weapon

== Bands reformed ==
- Dark Angel
- Falconer
- Gardenian
- Luna Mortis
- Minsk
- Mutiny Within
- Sonic Syndicate
- SugarComa (one-off reunion)
- Toxik

== Events ==
- Paul Di'Anno (ex-Iron Maiden) retired after his 2012 tour.
- HammerFall went on hiatus this year and did not release their next album until 2014.
- Lars Ulrich confirmed that Metallica's Orion Music + More festival will be held again this year.
- Ceremonial Oath, who split up in 1995, and Gardenian, who split up in 2004 and had not played a show in 12 years, both reunited for this year's edition of The Gothenburg Sound festival, which took place from January 4–5 at Trädgår'n in Gothenburg, Sweden.
- Metal Church, who split up twice (in 1994 and 2009), reunited for a second time at this year's 70000 Tons of Metal in January.
- Lamb of God singer Randy Blythe stood trial on February 4 on charges of manslaughter in the death of a fan at a concert in Prague, Czech Republic in 2010. He was acquitted on March 5, 2013, of all charges against him. Drummer Chris Adler said in an interview "Not only were we not able to generate any income, but we ended up having to pay more than half a million dollars in legal fees," the drummer said. "It bankrupted the entire band, no money left for any kind of payroll or anything."
- Rush was inducted into the Rock and Roll Hall of Fame, at the Nokia Theater in Los Angeles, California, on April 18.
- Liege Lord, who split up in 1989, reunited at the Keep It True XVI festival, which took place from April 19–20 at Tauberfrankenhalle in Lauda-Königshofen, Germany. They were the headliner of the festival.
- Cannibal Corpse celebrated the 25th anniversary of their formation.
- Anthrax announced the departure of guitarist Rob Caggiano.
- Volbeat announced that "former Anthrax and The Damned Things guitarist Rob Caggiano has officially joined Volbeat." Caggiano served as producer on "Outlaw Gentlemen & Shady Ladies" alongside long-time production partner Jacob Hansen, who produced and mixed the band's prior four albums.
- Danny Carey (Tool) admitted that he was the band member that had the motorcycle accident, "I cracked four ribs, broke three of them on a motorcycle the other day, so I am kinda laid up at this point. It's making it really painful to play. It's not an easy thing to do," he said.
- On February 18, 2013, bassist Daniel Antonsson quit Dark Tranquillity on good terms. Daniel wanted to focus on his own musical projects, play guitar rather than be the bassist in the band, and not wanting to commit to heavy touring of the band's 10th studio album and being a recording engineer/producer in his studio Gothenburg Rock Studios.
- Slayer drummer Dave Lombardo was not able to attend the Australian tour due to misgivings over contract negotiations. Jon Dette (ex-Evildead, ex-Testament) had replaced Dave for the remainder of the tour. On May 30, Slayer announced that Dave Lombardo has been officially replaced by Paul Bostaph (ex-Exodus, ex-Testament).
- Bison B.C. were dropped by Metal Blade Records, but the band still remains optimistic about the future.
- Symphony X drummer Jason Rullo suffered heart failure, but recovered with cardiac rehab.
- Korn announced that a new album featuring Brian "Head" Welch who officially rejoined the band after 8 years of absence.
- Tim Lambesis, vocalists for As I Lay Dying and Austrian Death Machine, was arrested after police said he tried to hire an undercover detective to kill his estranged wife. Tim has pleaded not guilty, and was released on bail for 2 million on May 31, 2013.
- Mike Portnoy (ex-Dream Theater) leaves Adrenaline Mob due to "scheduling conflicts".
- Protest the Hero drummer and original member Moe Carlson left the band after 12 years. Moe stated, "just to let you know, I'm going back to school, [I don't] have any intentions of touring ever again."

== Deaths ==
- January 16 – Claudio Leo, former guitarist of Lacuna Coil, died from cancer at the age of 40.
- January 26 – Bryan Carlstrom, recording engineer of numerous artists in a wide spectrum of genres, including Anthrax, Alice in Chains, D.R.I., Sacred Reich, White Zombie, and Incubus, died from undisclosed reasons at the age of 51.
- March 12 – Clive Burr, former drummer of Iron Maiden, Trust and Samson, died from multiple sclerosis complications at the age of 56.
- March 19 – David Henning "Blackmoon" Parland, founding member, songwriter, and multi-instrumentalist of numerous Swedish death and black metal bands, including Dark Funeral, Necrophobic, and Infernal, died by suicide at the age of 42.
- March 24 – Willi Lackmann, original Grave Digger bassist, died from undisclosed reasons.
- April 5 – Sławomir Kusterka (a.k.a. Mortifer), bassist of Hate, died from cardiac dysrhythmia in his sleep at the age of 27.
- April 5 – Jeremy Andrew "Andy" Johns, record producer and audio engineer of numerous artists, including Led Zeppelin, Van Halen, Ozzy Osbourne, and L.A. Guns, died from stomach ulcer complications at the age of 62.
- April 13 – Chi Cheng, bassist of Deftones died from complications following the 2008 car crash he was involved in at the age of 42.
- April 18 – Storm Elvin Thorgerson, graphic artist, music video director, and album cover designer of numerous artists, including Pink Floyd, Dream Theater, Black Sabbath, Rainbow, Helloween, and Bruce Dickinson, among others, died from cancer at the age of 69.
- May 2 – Jeffrey John "Jeff" Hanneman, founding member, songwriter, and guitarist of Slayer, died from alcohol-related cirrhosis of the liver at the age of 49.
- May 18 – Phil Buerstatte, former drummer of White Zombie, died from MRSA infection at the age of 46.
- May 21 – Trevor Bolder, bassist of Uriah Heep and Wishbone Ash, died from pancreatic cancer at the age of 62.
- June 1 – Maria Johanna Mårlöv, former Therion vocalist, died from cancer at the age of 38.
- June 2 – Mick Morris, bassist of Eighteen Visions and live bassist of Bleeding Through, died due to a pre-existing heart condition at the age of 35.
- August 10 – Phil Baheux, drummer of Channel Zero died from heart problems at the age of 45.
- August 23 – Joey LaCaze, founding member and drummer of Eyehategod, died from respiratory failure at the age of 42.

== Films ==
- Metallica released their 3D movie on August 9, 2013. The movie is entitled Metallica: Through the Never and was developed by Picturehouse.
- Dream Theater released their movie on November 4, 2013. The movie is entitled Dream Theater: Live at Luna Park and was developed by Eagle Rock Entertainment.

== Albums released ==
=== January ===
Day	Artist	Album
1	Oblivion	Called to Rise
1	Subterranean Masquerade	Home (EP)
8	Newsted	Metal (EP)
8	Hollywood Undead	Notes from the Underground
12	Mors Principium Est	...And Death Said Live
12	Mutiny Within	Synchronicity
18	Blockheads	The World is Dead
18	Helloween	Straight Out of Hell
18	Nightfall	Cassiopeia
18	Rotten Sound	Species at War (EP)
18	Saille	Ritu
21	Fen	Dustwalker
21	The Prophecy	Salvation
21	Riverside	Shrine of New Generation Slaves
22	Crashdïet	The Savage Playground
22	Holy Grail	Ride the Void
22	Love and Death	Between Here & Lost
22	Touché Amoré and Pianos Become the Teeth	Touché Amoré / Pianos Become the Teeth (Split EP)
22	Lightning Swords of Death	Baphometic Chaosium
22	Voivod	Target Earth
25	Convulse	Inner Evil
25	Cult of Luna	Vertikal
25	Hatebreed	The Divinity of Purpose
25	Koldbrann	Vertigo
25	Jørn Lande	Symphonic (compilation)
25	Pink Cream 69	Ceremonial
25	Stratovarius	Unbreakable (EP)
28	Funeral for a Friend	Conduit
29	A Sound of Thunder	Queen of Hell (EP)
29	Assassin	Chaos and Live Shots (DVD)
29	Circle II Circle	Seasons Will Fall
29	The Gates of Slumber	Stormcrow (EP)
29	Tomahawk	Oddfellows

=== February ===
Day	Artist	Album
1	The 69 Eyes	Love Runs Away (EP)
1	Blind Guardian	A Traveler's Guide to Space and Time (box set)
1	Enforcer	Death by Fire
1	Manilla Road	Mysterium
1	Raven Lord	Descent to the Underworld
1	Sinister	Years of Massacre (Compilation)
1	Sonic Reign	Monument in Black
5	Passages Into Deformity	Defeated Sanity
5	Hate	Solarflesh – A Gospel of Radiant Divinity
5	Red	Release the Panic
5	Spektr	Cypher
12	Bullet for My Valentine	Temper Temper
15	Misery Index	Live in Munich (live album)
15	Suffocation	Pinnacle of Bedlam
16	Sacred Steel	The Bloodshed Summoning
18	Officium Triste	Mors Viri
19	Complete Failure	The Art Gospel of Aggravated Assault
19	Black Boned Angel	The End
19	Portal	Vexovoid
19	Shai Hulud (band)	Reach Beyond the Sun
19	Wednesday 13	The Dixie Dead
22	Arkona	Decade of Glory
22	Eternal Tears of Sorrow	Saivon Lapsi
22	Lord	Digital Lies
22	Lost Soul	Genesis XX: Years Of Chaoz (Compilation)
22	Stratovarius	Nemesis
22	W.E.T.	Rise Up
25	Darkthrone	The Underground Resistance
25	Omnium Gatherum	Beyond
25	Steven Wilson	The Raven That Refused to Sing (And Other Stories)
26	Byzantine	Byzantine
26	Ruins	Place of No Pity
26	Vreid	Welcome Farewell
26	Within the Ruins	Elite

=== March ===
Day	Artist	Album
1	Crystallion	Killer
1	Rotting Christ	Kata ton Daimona Eaytoy
1	Saxon	Sacrifice
1	Thyrfing	De Ödeslösa
1	Wolfchant	Embraced by Fire
4	Hardcore Superstar	C'mon Take on Me
4	Long Distance Calling	The Flood Inside
5	Krokus	Dirty Dynamite
5	Neaera	Ours is the Storm
5	Soilwork	The Living Infinite
8	Horna	Askel Lähempänä Saatanaa
8	Lordi	To Beast or Not to Beast
11	Blood Tsunami	For Faen
11	Orange Goblin	A Eulogy For The Fans (DVD)
12	Adrenaline Mob	Covertá (EP)
12	Common Dead	Allegorize
12	Rammstein	Videos 1995–2012 (DVD)
15	Imperia	Queen of Passion (compilation)
15	KEN mode	Entrench
15	Torture Killer	Phobia
15	Wardruna	Runaljod - Yggdrasil
18	Intronaut	Habitual Levitations (Instilling Words with Tones)
19	Anthrax	Anthems (covers EP)
19	Clutch	Earth Rocker
19	Hundredth	Revolt (EP)
19	Jungle Rot	Terror Regime
19	Six Feet Under	Unborn
22	Adept	Silence the World
22	Aeternus	...And the Seventh His Soul Detesteth
22	Hypocrisy	End of Disclosure
22	Northlane	Singularity
22	Pretty Maids	Motherland
22	Serenity	War of Ages
22	Stonelake	Monolith
22	Trail of Tears	Oscillation
22	Visions of Atlantis	Ethera
22	Von	Dark Gods: Seven Billion Slaves
25	Amaranthe	The Nexus
25	The Amenta	Flesh Is Heir
25	Finntroll	Blodsvept
25	Gamma Ray	Master of Confusion (EP)
25	Moss	Horrible Nights
25	October Tide	Tunnel of No Light
25	Axel Rudi Pell	Live on Fire (DVD)
26	Benea Reach	Possession
26	DGM	Momentum
26	Kvelertak	Meir
26	Senses Fail	Renacer
26	Sevendust	Black Out the Sun
26	Stryper	Second Coming
26	Suicidal Tendencies	13
29	Persefone	Spiritual Migration
30	Avantasia	The Mystery of Time

=== April ===
Day	Artist	Album
2	Drowning Pool	Resilience
2	Killswitch Engage	Disarm the Descent
2	Bring Me the Horizon	Sempiternal
2	Toxic Holocaust	From the Ashes of Nuclear Destruction (compilation)
3	Dir En Grey	The Unraveling (EP)
5	Deathchain	Ritual Death Metal
5	Volbeat	Outlaw Gentlemen & Shady Ladies
5	Saltatio Mortis	Manufactum III
8	Device	Device
8	The Meads of Asphodel	Sonderkommando
8	Shining	One One One
9	Dawn of Ashes	Anathema
9	Ghost	Infestissumam
9	Keep of Kalessin	Introspection (EP)
9	Stone Sour	House of Gold & Bones – Part 2
12	Ctulu	Seelenspiegelsplitter
12	Memory Garden	Doomain
12	Mystic Prophecy	Best of Prophecy Years (compilation)
12	Wastefall	Meridiem (EP)
15	Iced Earth	Live In Ancient Kourion (DVD)
15	Sacred Mother Tongue	Out of the Darkness
15	Spiritual Beggars	Earth Blues
16	Jeff Loomis	Requiem for the Living (EP)
16	Skid Row	United World Rebellion: Chapter One (EP)
17	Coldrain	The Revelation
18	Noumena	Death Walks With Me
19	Amorphis	Circle
19	Beastwars	Blood Becomes Fire
19	Gama Bomb	The Terror Tapes
19	Heaven Shall Burn	Veto
19	Steak Number Eight	The Hutch
22	Hacride	Back to Where You've Never Been
23	Amplifier	Echo Street
23	Kaledon	Altor: The King's Blacksmith
23	Queensrÿche with Geoff Tate	Frequency Unknown
23	Rob Zombie	Venomous Rat Regeneration Vendor
24	Atrocity	Okkult
24	Dreamtale	World Changed Forever
26	Deep Purple	Now What?!
26	Howl	Bloodlines
26	The Ocean	Pelagial
26	Sodom	Epitome of Torture
26	Vicious Rumors	Electric Punishment
28	Malefice	Five
29	Cathedral	The Last Spire
29	Freedom Call	Ages Of Light (compilation)
29	Kingdom Come	Outlier
29	Satan	Life Sentence
30	After the Burial	This Life is All We Have (EP)
30	Altar of Plagues	Teethed Glory and Injury
30	Arsis	Unwelcome
30	Cauldron	Tomorrow's Lost (American Version)
30	Hybrid	Angst

=== May ===
Day	Artist	Album
1	Delain	Interlude (compilation)
3	Lacrimas Profundere	Antiadore
3	Rhapsody of Fire	Live – From Chaos to Eternity (live)
3	Shade Empire	Omega Arcane
7	Joe Satriani	Unstoppable Momentum
10	Arckanum	Fenris Kindir
10	Chaostar	Anomima
10	Immolation	Kingdom of Conspiracy
13	My Dying Bride	The Manuscript (EP)
14	The Dillinger Escape Plan	One of Us Is the Killer
14	Pop Evil	Onyx
14	Tribulation	The Formulas of Death
17	Blood Red Throne	Blood Red Throne
17	Gothminister	Utopia
17	Masterplan	Novum Initium
20	Leprous	Coal
20	Transport League	Boogie from Hell
21	Airbourne	Black Dog Barking
21	Avalon	The Land of New Hope
21	A Pale Horse Named Death	Lay My Soul to Waste
21	U.D.O.	Steelhammer
24	Anvil	Hope in Hell
24	Dew-Scented	Insurgent
24	Kylesa	Ultraviolet
24	Suidakra	Eternal Defiance
27	Burzum	Sôl Austan, Mâni Vestan
27	Dagoba	Post Mortem Nihil Est
27	Dark Tranquillity	Construct
27	Evile	Skull
27	Christopher Lee	Charlemagne: The Omens of Death
27	Tesseract	Altered State
28	Aborym	Dirty
28	Alice in Chains	The Devil Put Dinosaurs Here
28	Antigama	Meteor
28	Anvil	Hope in Hell
28	ASG	Blood Drive
28	Blood Ceremony	The Eldritch Dark
28	Judas Priest	Epitaph (DVD)
28	Sacred Oath	Fallen
28	Svartsyn	Black Testament
29	Chthonic	Bú-Tik
31	Cardiant	Verge
31	Tristania	Darkest White

=== June ===
Day	Artist	Album
3	White Wizzard	The Devil's Cut
4	Megadeth	Super Collider
5	Oliva	Raise the Curtain
7	Summoning	Old Mornings Dawn
11	The Black Dahlia Murder	Everblack
11	Black Sabbath	13
11	Boysetsfire	While a Nation Sleeps...
11	Children of Bodom	Halo of Blood
11	Deafheaven	Sunbather
11	Integrity	Suicide Black Snake
11	Jørn Lande	Traveller
11	My Ruin	The Sacred Mood
11	Scale the Summit	The Migration
14	Magnus Karlsson	Free Fall
17	Amberian Dawn	Re-Evolution (compilation)
17	Kalmah	Seventh Swamphony
18	Dark Moor	Ars Musica
18	Fuck the Facts	Amer (EP)
18	High on Fire	Spitting Fire Live Vol. 1 (live)
18	High on Fire	Spitting Fire Live Vol. 2 (live)
18	Valient Thorr	Our Own Masters
21	Edenbridge	The Bonding
21	Eternal Oath	Ghostlands
21	Extol	Extol
21	Raven	Rock Until You Drop (DVD)
24	Autopsy	The Headless Ritual
24	Firewind	Apotheosis – Live 2012 (live)
24	Orphaned Land	All Is One
24	Queensrÿche with Todd La Torre	Queensrÿche
25	Amon Amarth	Deceiver of the Gods
25	August Burns Red	Rescue & Restore
25	Deeds of Flesh	Portals to Canaan
25	Havok	Unnatural Selection
25	Hopes Die Last	Wolfpack EP
25	Mouth of the Architect	Dawning
25	Skillet	Rise
26	Hibria	Silent Revenge
26	Trauma	Karma Obscura
28	Agathodaimon	In Darkness
28	Darkane	The Sinister Supremacy
28	Impiety	Vengeance Hell Immemorial (compilation)
28	Månegarm	Legions of the North
28	Sirenia	Perils of the Deep Blue

=== July ===
Day	Artist	Album
1	Revenger Lupus	Extinción
2	Huntress	Starbound Beast
9	Butcher Babies	Goliath
9	Battlecross	War of Will
9	Nothnegal	Nothnegal (EP)
10	Proyecto Eskhata	"El despertar de Queztgull"
12	Hypocrisy	Penetralia / Osculum (box-set)
15	Panzerchrist	7th Offensive
16	Evan Brewer	Your Itinerary
18	King Conquer	1776
18	Philip H. Anselmo & The Illegals	Walk Through Exits Only
18	Seven Witches	Rebirth
18	Trouble	The Distortion Field
19	Baroness	Live At Maida Vale (live EP)
19	Karnivool	Asymmetry
19	Powerwolf	Preachers of the Night
22	Stormzone	Three Kings
23	American Head Charge	Shoot (EP)
23	Black Tusk	Tend No Wounds (EP)
23	Counterparts	The Difference Between Hell and Home
23	Five Finger Death Punch	The Wrong Side of Heaven and the Righteous Side of Hell, Volume 1
23	Legion of the Damned	Ravenous Plague
23	Misery Signals	Absent Light
26	Deadlock	The Arsonist
26	We Came as Romans	Tracing Back Roots
27	Mercenary	Through Our Darkest Days
29	James LaBrie	Impermanent Resonance
30	Chimaira	Crown of Phantoms

=== August ===
Day	Artist	Album
2	The Defiled	Daggers
2	Lingua Mortis Orchestra and Rage	LMO
2	Exhumed	Necrocracy
6	Iwrestledabearonce	Late For Nothing
6	Newsted	Heavy Metal Music
6	Revocation	Revocation (album)
8	Rosetta	The Anaesthete
16	Fleshgod Apocalypse	Labyrinth
16	Manowar	The Lord Of Steel Live (live EP)
16	Soil	Whole
19	Watain	The Wild Hunt
20	Blessthefall	Hollow Bodies
20	Born of Osiris	Tomorrow We Die Alive
21	Turisas	Turisas2013
23	ReVamp	Wild Card
23	Tarja Turunen	Colours in the Dark
23	Unshine	Dark Half Rising
27	Avenged Sevenfold	Hail to the King
27	DevilDriver	Winter Kills
30	Gorguts	Colored Sands
30	Kreator	Dying Alive (DVD)
30	Nine Inch Nails	Hesitation Marks
31	Avulsed	Ritual Zombi
31	Kayo Dot	Hubardo

=== September ===
Day	Artist	Album
2	Haken	The Mountain
2	The Safety Fire	Mouth of Swords
3	Beneath The Horror	Libres y Alzando la Voz (single)
3	Deliverance	Hear What I Say!
3	Vista Chino	Peace
3	Annihilator	Feast
6	Dark Age	A Matter of Trust
6	Ministry	From Beer to Eternity
6	Ashes Of Ares	Ashes Of Ares
7	Michael Angelo Batio	Intermezzo
9	Satyricon	Satyricon
10	Gemini Syndrome	Lux
10	Nine Inch Nails	Live 2013 EP (EP)
13	Onslaught	VI
13	Poisonblack	Lyijy
13	Carcass	Surgical Steel
17	The Devil Wears Prada	8:18
17	Eyes Set to Kill	Masks
17	Ulcerate	Vermis (album)
17	Týr	Valkyrja
17	Gwar	Battle Maximus
20	Hirax	Immortal Legacy
20	Stormlord	Hesperia
24	Dream Theater	Dream Theater
24	Megadeth	Countdown to Extinction: Live (CD/DVD)
24	Ra	Critical Mass
25	The Gathering	Afterwords
27	Master	The Witchhunt
27	myGRAIN	Planetary Breathing
27	Mystic Prophecy	Killhammer
27	Wisdom	Marching for Liberty
27	Hatesphere	Murderlust
30	Devin Townsend	The Retinal Circus (CD/DVD)

=== October ===
Day	Artist	Album
1	Broken Hope	Omen Of Disease
1	The Browning	Hypernova
1	Fates Warning	Darkness in a Different Light
1	Scar the Martyr	Scar the Martyr
1	Within Temptation	Paradise (What About Us?)
4	Running Wild	Resilient
4	Soulfly	Savages
8	A Day to Remember	Common Courtesy
8	Korn	The Paradigm Shift
8	Ulver	Messe I.X-VI.X
11	Death Angel	The Dream Calls for Blood
11	Testament	Dark Roots of Thrash (CD/DVD)
14	Deep Purple	Perfect Strangers Live (DVD)
15	Doomriders	Grand Blood
15	Red Fang	Whales and Leeches
15	Trivium	Vengeance Falls
15	Monster Magnet	Last Patrol
16	Europe	Live At Sweden Rock – 30th Anniversary Show (DVD)
21	Pestilence	Obsideo
21	Motörhead	Aftershock
22	Ihsahn	Das Seelenbrechen
22	Lita Ford	The Bitch is Back... Live
22	Metal Church	Generation Nothing
25	Inquisition	Obscure Verses for the Multiverse
25	Sahg	Delusions Of Grandeur
25	Sepultura	The Mediator Between Head and Hands Must Be the Heart
28	Ayreon	The Theory of Everything
28	Hail Of Bullets	III: The Rommel Chronicles
28	Man Must Die	Peace Was Never an Option
29	Kataklysm	Waiting For The End To Come
29	Kill Devill Hill	Revolution Rise
29	Myka Relocate	Lies to Light the Way
29	Protest the Hero	Volition
29	Skeletonwitch	Serpents Unleashed
29	Toxic Holocaust	Chemistry of Consciousness
29	Warbringer	IV: Empires Collapse
29	Winds of Plague	Resistance

=== November ===
Day	Artist	Album
5	Dream Theater	Live at Luna Park
5	Falkenbach	Asa
5	Melvins	Tres Cabrones
5	Stryper	No More Hell To Pay
8	Cronian	Erathems
8	Endstille	Kapitulation 2013
8	Epica	Retrospect (DVD)
8	Iron Mask	Fifth Son of Winterdoom
12	Handful of Hate	To Perdition
12	Living Sacrifice	Ghost Thief
12	Black Tide	Bite the Bullet (EP)
13	Leaves' Eyes	Symphonies of the Night
13	Sacrificium	Prey for Your Gods
15	Apocalyptica	Wagner Reloaded (Live)
15	Alestorm	Live At The End Of The World (DVD)
18	Rush	Clockwork Angels Tour
19	Code	Augur Nox
19	Ephel Duath	Hemmed By Light, Shaped By Darkness
19	Five Finger Death Punch	The Wrong Side of Heaven and the Righteous Side of Hell, Volume 2
22	Artillery	Legions
22	Betzefer	The Devil Went Down to the Holy Land
22	Hell	Curse And Chapter
22	Pro-Pain	The Final Revolution
22	Rhapsody of Fire	Dark Wings of Steel
25	Almah	Raise The Sun
25	S7N	Fearless
26	Black Sabbath	Live... Gathered in Their Masses
26	Deicide	In the Minds of Evil
29	Benedictum	Obey
29	Human Fortress	Raided Land
29	Nightwish	Showtime, Storytime (DVD/CD)

=== December ===
Day	Artist	Album
18	Skálmöld and the Iceland Symphony Orchestra	Skálmöld & Sinfóníuhljómsveit Íslands (CD/DVD)

Preceded by 2012	Heavy Metal Timeline; 2013	Succeeded by 2014
