= Mescalyne =

EP by Spektr
- Released: June 2007
- Genre: Black metal
- Length: 22:58
- Label: Debemur Morti Productions

Spektr chronology
Near Death Experience (2006)	Mescalyne (2007)

Mescalyne is the first EP by the black metal band Spektr. It was released in 2007 on Debemur Morti Productions.

== Track listing ==
1. Hollow Contact - 6:43
2. Mescalyne - 5:37
3. Maze of Torment - 4:57
4. Revelations - 5:41
