= Spektr (band) =

French experimental black metal band

- Origin: Paris, France
- Genres: Black metal Industrial music
- Years active: 2000 – present
- Label: Candlelight Records
- Members: Kl.K; Hth
- Past members: E.N.H

Spektr is an experimental black metal duo formed in 2000, in Paris, France. They are currently signed to Candlelight Records and have released four full-length albums to date. The band's sound is a mix of raw black metal in style of Darkthrone with elements of industrial and dark ambient, which has drawn comparisons to the more recent works of fellow countrymen Blut Aus Nord.

Their work has drawn very wide attention and acclaim, with their first album being dubbed 'the weirdest black metal album ever' by Aquarius Records in San Francisco, and their second being acclaimed as "absolutely essential, unique and memorable" and "an album with a solid artistic value".

Very little is known about the members of this group, other than that they are also involved with the black metal groups Battlehorns and Haemoth.

The band released its fourth full-length album, entitled The Art to Disappear, on 29 January 2016 via Agonia Records.

== Members ==
=== Current line-up ===
- Haemoth - guitars, bass, vocals, samples, programming (2000-)
- kl.K. - vocals, drums, samples, programming (2000-)

=== Past members ===
- E.N.H. - guitar (2000-2003)

== Discography ==
=== Albums ===
- Et Fugit Intera Fugit Irreparabile Tempus (2004)
- Near Death Experience (2006)
- Cypher (2013)
- The Art to Disappear (2016)

=== EPs ===
- Mescalyne (2007)
