= Deadline (S7N album) =

Studio album by S7N
- Released: June 17, 2016
- Recorded: 02–March 2016
- Studio: SMStudios in Mexico City
- Genre: Heavy metal, thrash metal
- Length: 37:24
- Label: Intolerancia
- Producer: Erik Canales

S7N chronology
Fearless (2013)	Deadline (2016)

Singles from Deadline
- 1. "Innocent Guilty" Released: April 29, 2016; 2. "Bomb Maker" Released: June 5, 2017

Deadline is the second studio album by the Mexican heavy metal band S7N, released on June 17, 2016. In 2016, the album was nominated for Best Metal/Hardcore Album on the 15th Independent Music Awards.

== Production and promotion ==
The band recorded the album in SMStudios in Mexico City during February and March, 2016. The album was produced by Allison's singer Erik Canales, who also participated with arrangements. The album was crowdfunded during the first trimester of 2016, allowing fans to be part of the recording sessions as a reward. Eduardo Carrillo and Manuel Vázquez, from SMStudios and Mexican progressive metal band Agora, served as audio engineers, with Vázquez also collaborating with "Innocent Guilty"'s guitar solo composition and recording.

The band's debut single "Innocent Guilty" was released on April 29, 2016, with a lyric video via YouTube. On May 21, the band had a listening party for fans, media and friends at Mexico City, where they debuted the album. "Bomb Maker" was released as second single on June 5, 2017, with a music video directed by Lack of Remorse's singer Andrei Pulver.

== Reception ==
Professional ratings
Review scores
Source	Rating
Rolling Stone	3/4 stars
Reina El Metal	4/5 stars
Bizarro.fm	4/5 stars

Deadline received positive reviews from music critics. Miguel H. Zetter of Rolling Stone Mexico defines the album as "Mexican metal for exportation". Poncho Civeira compares Deadline's essence with "Black Sabbath's heaviness and Metallica's power."

== Track listing ==
No.	Title	Length
1.	"Last Dance"	5:11
2.	"Fatal Disease"	4:10
3.	"Innocent Guilty"	4:53
4.	"Deadline"	6:12
5.	"Bomb Maker"	4:03
6.	"Hated King"	3:44
7.	"My Own War"	4:51
8.	"Enough Is Enough"	4:23
Total length:		37:24

== Personnel ==
S7N

- Mao Kanto – lead vocals, rhythm guitar
- Guillermo García – lead guitar, backing vocals
- Israel Monroy – lead guitar, backing vocals
- Lalo Olvera – bass guitar

Additional musicians

- Leo Padua – drums
- Manuel Vázquez – guitar solo on "Innocent Guilty"

Production

- Erik Canales – producer, arrangements
- Eduardo Carrillo – engineer
- Manuel Vázquez – engineer
- Distinctive Audio – mixing, mastering
- Karla Farrugia – cover art
