= Swarth =

Studio album by Portal
- Released: 20 October 2009
- Recorded: 2008–2009
- Studio: Awryeon Audio
- Genres: Avant-garde metal, black metal, death metal
- Length: 40:42
- Label: Profound Lore
- Producer: Aphotic Mote

Portal chronology
Outré (2007)	Swarth (2009)	Vexovoid (2013)

Swarth is the third studio album by Australian extreme metal band Portal. It was released on October 20, 2009 through Profound Lore Records. The CD version of the album was packaged in a gatefold hard cover digi-sleeve, with a 16-page booklet.

== Musical style ==
In their review of the album, Exclaim! described it as the album's style "unique and unorthodox", but noted that it kept to the sound established on Portal's previous albums. They wrote that the album has "an extremely raw feel, with heavily distorted guitar riffs that aid in the album's overall chaotic and apocalyptic atmosphere. The release's eight tracks all contain that same distortion blast anchored by down-tuned rhythms, sharing some black metal aspects."

== Critical reception ==
Professional ratings
Review scores
Source	Rating
AllMusic	2/5 stars
Sputnikmusic	4/5

The album received largely positive reception from music critics. Sputnikmusic praised the performances by every member of the band, and described the album as "claustrophobic", and as "the heaviest, most extreme offering of music to ever be created." NPR Music's Lars Gottrich wrote that "Nothing gave me more nightmares than Portal's 2009 album Swarth", describing the album as "pure audio horror, the kind of abstract death metal record that, while a brilliant feat, is almost something like watching Requiem for a Dream for me — I'm inspired by the experience, but don't revisit it that often." Terrorizer named it the 13th best metal album of 2009.

== Track listing ==
All music is composed by Portal.

No.	Title	Length
1.	"Swarth"	4:15
2.	"Larvae"	4:26
3.	"Illoomorpheme"	3:16
4.	"The Swayy"	5:22
5.	"Writhen"	4:51
6.	"Omenknow"	3:03
7.	"Werships"	8:36
8.	"Marityme"	6:53

== Personnel ==
- The Curator – vocals
- Horror Illogium – lead guitar, bass (played on recording, though Omenous Fugue is listed as bassist in the credits)
- Aphotic Mote – rhythm guitar
- Omenous Fugue – bass
- Ignis Fatuus – drums
