= A Dark Enchanted Crystal Night =

Studio album by Crystallion
- Released: 4 December 2006
- Genre: Power metal
- Length: 58:29
- Label: STF Records

Crystallion chronology
| Knights of the Apocalypse : ...Nemesis (2005) | A Dark Enchanted Crystal Night (2006) | Hattin (2008) |

A Dark Enchanted Crystal Night is the first full-length album by the power metal band Crystallion. It was released in 2006.

== Track listing ==
| No. | Title | Length |
|---|---|---|
| 1. | "A Dark Enchanted Crystal Night" | 0:55 |
| 2. | "Guardians of the Sunrise" | 5:17 |
| 3. | "Visions" | 8:05 |
| 4. | "Eternia" | 6:42 |
| 5. | "Crystal Clear" | 6:13 |
| 6. | "Tears in the Rain" | 7:00 |
| 7. | "Dragonheart" | 8:20 |
| 8. | "Burning Bridges" | 6:46 |
| 9. | "The Final Revelation" | 9:11 |
| Total length: | | 58:29 |
