= Beyond Undeniable Entropy =

EP by Hybrid
- Released: June 1, 2006
- Recorded: June 2005
- Genre: Avant-garde metal, extreme metal
- Length: 21:28
- Label: Dead Wrong
- Producer: Hybrid

Hybrid chronology
Beyond Undeniable Entropy (2006)	The 8th Plague (2008)

Beyond Undeniable Entropy is the debut EP by Spanish extreme metal band Hybrid, originally released in 2006 by Deadwrong Records; a six song EP of the band's sound "avant-garde extreme metal that mixes brutal death metal, black metal, doom, crust, grindcore and even latin, bossa nova and crazy free jazz."

== Track listing ==
1. "Ave Phoenix" – 2:53
2. "Sleep of the Defeated" – 3:55
3. "Sun Burnt" – 2:53
4. "Insomnia" – 3:35
5. "Growing Misanthropy" – 3:52
6. "Throne of the Necronaut" – 4:20

== Personnel ==
- Enrique Maroto - bass
- Chus Maestro - drums
- Javier Domiguez - guitar
- Miguel Frutos - guitar, vocals
- Unai García - vocals
