= Outré (Portal album) =

Studio album by Portal
- Released: September 11, 2007
- Genre: Death metal; avant-garde metal; black metal
- Length: 36:36
- Language: English
- Label: Profound Lore

Portal chronology
Lurker at the Threshold (2006)	Outré (2007)	Swarth (2009)

Outré is the second studio album by Australian extreme metal band Portal. The album was released on September 11, 2007 through Profound Lore Records. The band has described the album as "the end result of the Seepia clearing, the Vint-Age of our ideal barren landscape and atmosphere, a time heralding antiquated and stern artifacts which yield only the foul."

== Background ==
Portal were unhappy with how their previous album, 2003's Seepia, as they intended for a darker, more atmospheric sound. "After some years of exploration and many songs scrapped we had finally found what we were looking for, with a more simplisitc, minimal and ritualistic approach, letting the music breathe and utilizing more powerful simplistic drum patterns had opened up the door to make pure darkness with our sound, we used the speed and technicality when it was appropriate, something "Seepia" lacked with unintelligent choices in drum arrangements." In 2006, the band released a demo tape titled 'Lurker at the Threshold' which was intended to bridge the gap between the more extreme sound of Seepia and the style the band sought to articulate on Outre', and has been described by the band as a "transition period". These songs were later modified and re-recorded, and all three are featured on the final version of Outre', and the band considers the album versions superior.

== Critical reception ==
Professional ratings
Review scores
Source	Rating
Metal Injection	7.5/10
PopMatters	8/10 stars

Outre received generally positive reviews from music critics and fans. Critics praised the unorthodox nature of the band's sound as well as their Lovecraftian horror-influenced lyrics and aesthetic, which critics noted felt returned a sense of horror and danger to death metal. Writing for PopMatters, Adrien Begrand described the album as "truly friggin' terrifying." Begrand compared the band's lyrical approach to William Burroughs, described the production as "unrelentingly stifling", and wrote that "Not unlike black metal, it’s more preoccupied with atmosphere and less with technical proficiency, the songs constantly projecting a supremely creepy vibe, from the awkward cadence of the percussion, to the haunting thrum of bass (or as the liner notes put it, the “Writhing Undertow of Omnitidings & Rift”), to the lo-fi churning of guitars (wait, is that a melody in “13 Globes”?). [...] the astonishing Outré is not only a highly disturbing slice of extreme music, but also an essential one." Metal Injection gave a positive assessment of the album, arguing that the band "challenges the very notion of what is death metal." They suggested that the album's production style had both its strengths and weaknesses, writing that "Blastbeats sometimes bubble up, as do death growls here and there. But this album gives listeners no help. With virtually no repetition or predictability, it's more of a soundscape than a series of tracks. Thus, it can be a slog. The title track sounds like a howling headache. But it's also strangely addictive. This is death metal from another dimension, an alien jolt to the senses."

== Track listing ==
No.	Title	Length
1.	"Moil"	1:35
2.	"Abysmill"	4:46
3.	"Heirships"	6:06
4.	"Omnipotent Crawling Chaos"	5:17
5.	"Black Houses"	5:00
6.	"Outre"	2:32
7.	"13 Globes"	4:08
8.	"Sourlows"	7:18

== Personnel ==
- The Curator – vocals
- Horror Illogium – lead guitar
- Aphotic Mote – rhythm guitar
- Elsewhere – bass
- Monocular – drums
- Jeff Lowe – artwork
