= Et Fugit Intera Fugit Irreparabile Tempus =

Studio album by Spektr
- Released: 2004
- Genre: Black metal, black ambient
- Length: 46:19
- Label: Appease Me

Spektr chronology
Et Fugit Intera Fugit Irreparabile Tempus (2004)	Near Death Experience (2006)

Et Fugit Intera Fugit Irreparabile Tempus is the debut album by the experimental black metal band Spektr. This album is often mistakenly titled "No Longer Human Senses", which is actually the album's subtitle.

== Track listing ==
1. "No Longer Human Senses" — 9:03
2. "Post Fatalism" — 04:18
3. "Reveal the Four Seals" — 05:07
4. "Nothing's Been Worth Saving (The Procession)" — 05:41
5. "A Return to the Flesh" — 05:37
6. "Wizened Hand" — 08:14
7. "...With Only One Eye" — 02:06
8. "Confusion / The Persistence" (Ending Contakt) — 06:48

== Musicians ==
- kl.K. (a.k.a. Krig) — drums, vocals, samples, programming
- Hth — guitars, bass, vocals, samples, programming
