= Marching for Liberty =

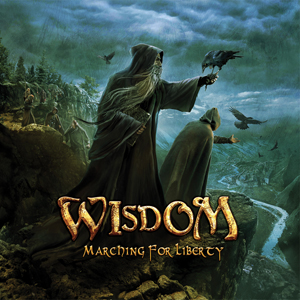

Studio album by Wisdom
- Released: 27 September 2013
- Recorded: 2012 April - 2013 May; Blacksmith Studio, Supersize Studio, Budapest, Hungary; Denever Studio, Szolnok, Hungary
- Genre: Heavy metal, power metal
- Length: 46:25
- Label: NoiseArt Records (Worldwide), Nail Records (Hungary)
- Producer: Gabor Kovacs

Wisdom chronology
Judas (2011)	Marching for Liberty (2013)

Marching for Liberty is the third studio album by Hungarian heavy metal band Wisdom, released on 27 September 2013, through Noise Art Records. The album came out in Hungary one week later through Nail Records.

== Background ==
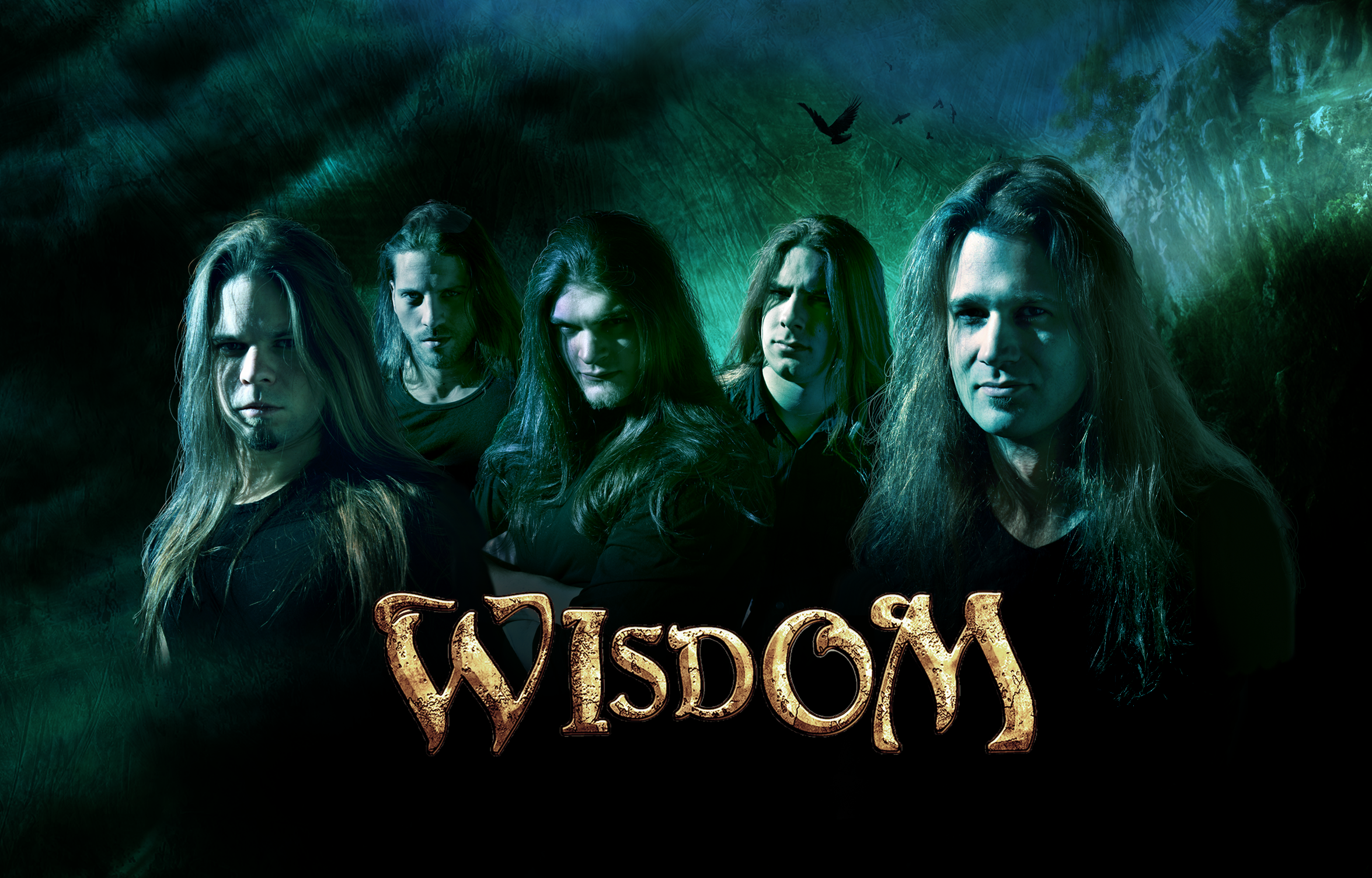
Wisdom 2013

Several international record labels became interested in Wisdom after Judas was released in Hungary. Serious negotiations got started with the Austrian Noise Art Records and the German AFM Records. After all in January 2012 Wisdom signed to Noise Art Records, which cooperated with one of the world's biggest concert organizer office called Rock The Nation. Results: Rock The Nation sent the band for a European tour which began in September 2012 and lasted for months. Zsolt Galambos, the guitarist couldn't take part in this tour so Mate Bodor was recruited as his replacement. His guitar playing can also be heard on the album titled Marching For Liberty. All of the songs on the album were composed from scratch, so not one previous idea or sketch was used or recycled. Most of the new songs were created by Gabor Kovacs in two weeks’ time. This was a remarkable improvement because previously he needed numerous weeks or months to finish only one song. Of course the arrangement of the album's further details took a lot of time as always. Originally the release of Marching for Liberty was April 2013, but due to logistic reasons it was postponed for six months. Finally the album came out worldwide on 27 September 2013 via Noise Art Records. One week later the album came out in Hungary on Nail Records. On their previous album, Judas, the band tried to play it safe because they had a brand new singer on board. During the recording of their new material, Marching For Liberty, they unleashed their experimental and creative side and tried several new techniques and methods that they have never used before. A good example of this that they recorded the chorus parts with choir of opera singers.

== Album title and cover ==
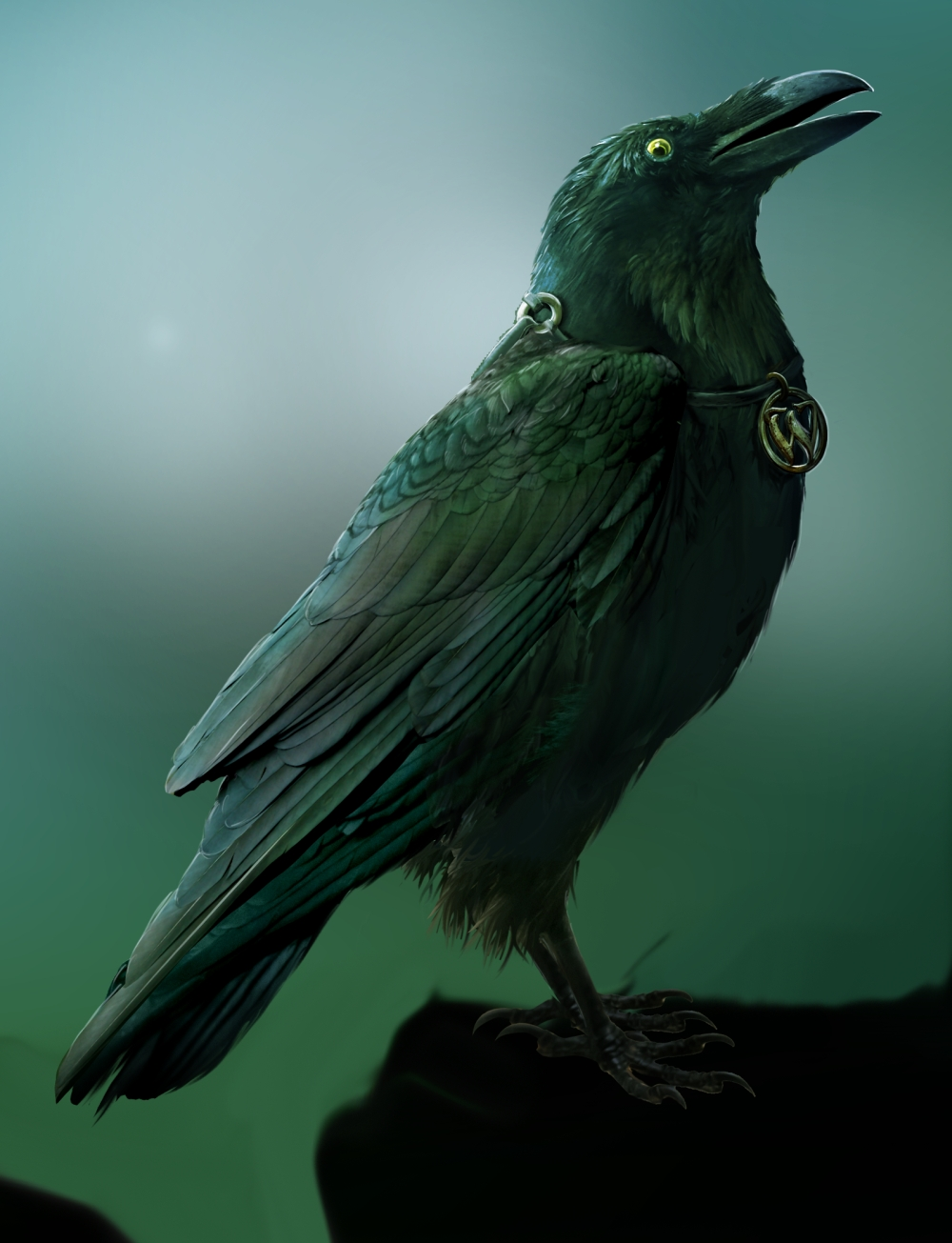
The raven, wearing a Wisdom-medal

Wiseman's story reached a turning point when he overcame the betrayal of Judas and felt that the time has come to start a journey with his disciples to liberate the people living under tyranny. The album's title refers to this situation. This is the fourth album cover which was created by Gyula Havancsak for the band. He won several awards with this cover the Hangsúly Metal Award for example, where the votes of journalists decide on the winning piece of art. The cover features Wiseman and his disciples as they are heading towards the city dominated by the evil power that emerges from distant parts of the valley next to the river. On the edge of the cliff a raven had just flown onto Wiseman's arm. It is wearing a medal of the Wisdom logo around its neck. In Hungarian mythology and history the raven is the carrier of good news and hope. The back side of the cover captures the moment when the raven flies away from Wiseman's arm. The following quotation which holds the essence of the album's message is from the song titled "World of the Free".

No words can say what we feel
We bring the change, have no fear
We are the ones who will fight
For a brave new world of the free.

== Songs ==
=== World Of The Free ===
"World Of The Free" reminds an a capella oriented symphonic style song and functions not just as the intro of the album but a bit more than that. The first half of the text was originally written for "Marching For Liberty" instead of the Latin verse of the song when the translation was not yet completed. After the translation was finished this segment became redundant, but later it has been used for the intro. It summarized the concept of the album so perfectly that it became the motto of the album also.

=== Dust Of The Sun ===
In some respects the Marching For Liberty album can be considered as a pioneering effort in the life of the band because more members participated in the process of songwriting. Previously Gabor Kovacs and Mate Molnar had written every song. The musical and textual roots of the dynamic "Dust Of The Sun" came from Balazs Agota and his ideas were developed jointly by all the band members. This fast and pure power metal track with its chorus is reminiscent of the classic Rhapsody Of Fire songs. This was the first occasion when Balazs tried to write a song and he instantly caught the spirit of the band perfectly. He has brought something new and exciting to the table lyrically with his particular interpretation of existence.

=== War Of Angels ===
The stomping, mid-tempo song "War Of Angels" is like an epic battle anthem and shows a new side of the band however the final result is 100% Wisdom. It contains more powerful riffing and grooves than an ordinary Wisdom track, but the monumental Nightwish-like choruses countervail these features. The shout chorus parts alternating with the choir make more sense to the message of the song. The theme of this track is the fight of fallen angels but its message can be meaningful for everyone in every age. It tells the story of a man who does not act like a coward and is brave enough to stand up for his right even though he knows he is doomed.

=== Failure Of Nature ===
The epic, Ronnie James Dio style "Failure Of Nature" is one of the slowest Wisdom songs. The weight of the main riff and the sluggishness of the tempo give a sense of dramatic vibes. Its lyrics are also based upon a deep and serious topic. The Beauty and the Beast and Frankenstein also inspired the verses of the lyrics which tell the story of a man whose inner qualities are neglected and forgotten because of his disfigured outlook; regardless of the fact that his personality might conceal remarkable values. This distorted-looking person gets tired of the useless struggles so he decides to escape to another place in hopes of understanding.

=== The Martyr ===
"The Martyr" is a pounding power metal song with sweeping dynamics about a newest period of Wiseman's life. According to this song the chosen ones are continuously searching for wisdom in the depths of secret forest, but some were unlucky and they got struck by the murdering hands of power. They die as martyrs during their fight for truth. Although this part is not included amongst the episodes of Wiseman's life, but these side stories also pertain to Wiseman's life.

=== God Rest Your Soul ===
"God Rest Your Soul" sets out with a medieval acoustic guitar before turning into a thunderous uptempo track. The lyrics are about an innocent animal which was killed by a hunter or about a person who is killed by a lethal bullet. Thereby his soul will be free forever and he can find peace in heaven.

=== Take Me To Neverland ===
The sweeping "Take Me To Neverland" contains power and melodic guitars with a dynamic rhythmic section. This is the easiest song to digest from the album both musically and thematically speaking. The lyric is about the everyday life, but in the chorus parts it has cinematic fantasy elements too. A director has started to make a monumental, animated music video for the song more than one year before the release of the album, but it has not been finished as of the release of the record. Nevertheless, "Take Me To Neverland" was used during the promotional stage, so around the time the album was released this was the most well-known new song from the album.

=== Wake Up My Life ===
Since 2007 the band has not made an acoustic song with a similar nature like "Wake Up My Life", still they think that these kind of songs provide the best opportunity to express deeply emotional feelings. Anyone can end up in a situation where one couldn't get out of the hole which he or she dug for oneself, but with help it could be managed. The essential question of the song is the following: will there be someone who is willing to take the time to save a dying soul? It is a cliché, however it is certainly true: a friend in need is a friend indeed.

=== My Fairytale ===
The speedier "My Fairytale" widened the scope of the band a little towards folk metal, but these influences can be only discovered in terms of atmosphere and mood. Perhaps this is the most positive song from the whole album, which takes place in a fantasy world where life is as magical as in a Fairytale. It is quite odd and paradox that the quotation which expresses the song's meaning the best originates from Mary Shelley, the author of the horrifying novel, Frankenstein.

=== Have No Fear ===
"Have No Fear" was compiled from Gabor Nagy's ideas and by this the number of members who took part in the song writing process of Marching For Liberty increased to four. The lyrics of the song guide the listener to the world of monotone, never-ending marches, where the frosty, cold winter surroundings ("General Winter") also torment the warriors. They don't give up, but their situation is hopeless as they die after another. This was the first Wisdom song ever which used a quote from a Hungarian writer, Imre Madách. It is taken from his drama The Tragedy of Man. The upper quoted line represents perfectly the message of "Have No Fear".

=== Live Like A Beast ===
The fast and powerful "Live Like A Beast" with thundering guitars and catchy melodies is the most furious song of Wisdom's history and its lyrics have a similar tone also. It's about the last days of a malefactor who is detested even by his loved ones, who are the closest to him, because of the ruthless sins he has committed in his lifetime. It is the will of people to rid him from society. Marching For Liberty is an album which has faster songs and stronger dynamics than the previous record, Judas. This composition is part of the kind of songs which uses double bass drum; however there are quite unusual shifts in its structure.

=== Marching For Liberty ===
"Marching For Liberty" is the title track of the album and also the longest Wisdom song. Starts with an acoustic guitar right before barging with immense power metal. The polyphonic part of the song has a bigger role here than the main singing. The band does not use any accompanying synthesizers or a big orchestra so it tries to make their music more monumental with the help of vocals, choirs and decorative guitar sections. The story of this title song is the current chapter of Wiseman's life. The actions take place not long after the betrayal by Judas, which Wiseman was able to survive and he thought that the time has come for him and his followers to start the quest of liberating the people suffering under the rule of evil. Fabio Lione, the singer of Rhapsody Of Fire makes a guest performance in the song as a bard character. He has the role of a lyrical storyteller, who reappears time after time and by this act he provides a contrast to the ambitious and dense instrumental parts.

== Reception ==
Since the release of Judas and the signing to an international record label contract the band has toured a lot and increased its fan base. The new album which was in the making during this period took the advantage of the heightened interest and arrived just in time. As the first complete album at Noise Art it received widespread international promotion, so it reached all parts of the world.

Marching For Liberty received high praise from music critics and from the audience as well. In Hungary the album opened at the top of the list of MAHASZ and several other media ranked it among the best albums of year.

== Album release show and tour ==
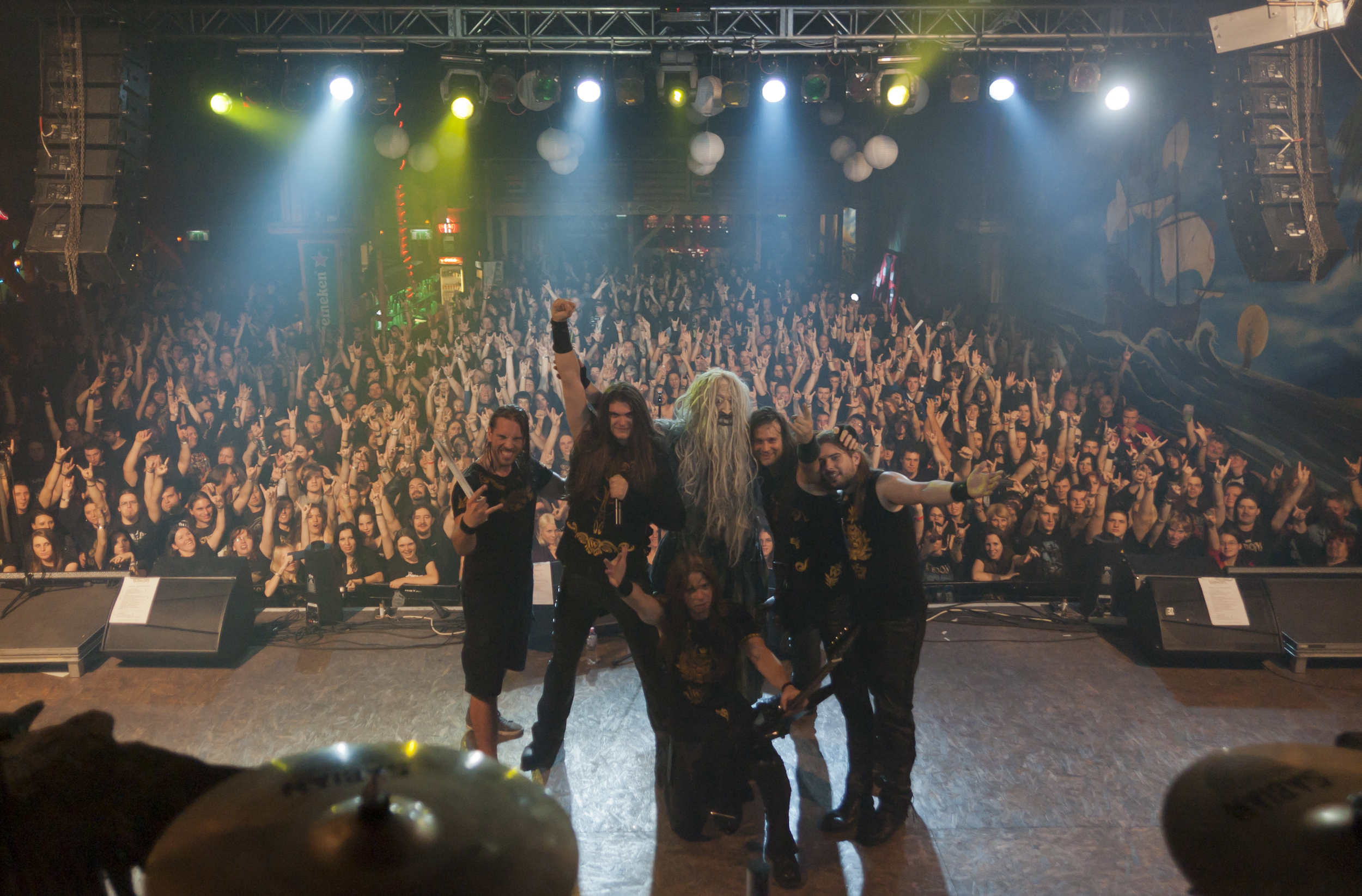
Marching For Liberty album release show

The official premiere of Marching for Liberty was on 15 November 2013 as part of the seventh Keep Wiseman Alive concert. It was held in the Barba Negra Club, Budapest, Hungary. Every song was played from the record during the concert except for "Live Like a Beast", "The Martyr" and "My Fairytale". "World Of The Free" opened the show as an intro. The album release tour took place between October and November in 2013. Wisdom was a guest act on the German Powerwolf’s Wolfsnächte tour which visited nine cities in Europe.

=== Songs performed at the album release show ===
War Of Angels / God Rest Your Soul / Somewhere Alone / Fate / Have No Fear / Fallin' Away From Grace / King Of Death / Live Forevermore / Wake Up My Life / Marching For Liberty / Rhapsody – Holy Thunderforce / Failure Of Nature / Take Me To Neverland / Judas /// Wisdom /

== Track listing ==
No.	Title	Lyrics	Music	Length
1.	"World of the Free"	Mate Molnar	Gabor Kovacs	0:44
2.	"Dust of the Sun"	Balazs Agota, Mate Molnar	Balazs Agota, Gabor Kovacs	3:55
3.	"War of Angels"	Mate Molnar	Gabor Kovacs	3:36
4.	"Failure of Nature"	Mate Molnar	Gabor Kovacs	4:15
5.	"The Martyr"	Mate Molnar	Gabor Kovacs	3:04
6.	"God Rest Your Soul"	Mate Molnar	Gabor Kovacs	3:18
7.	"Take Me to Neverland"	Mate Molnar	Gabor Kovacs	3:59
8.	"Wake Up My Life"	Mate Molnar	Gabor Kovacs	3:22
9.	"My Fairytale"	Mate Molnar	Gabor Kovacs	3:50
10.	"Have No Fear"	Mate Molnar	Gabor Nagy, Gabor Kovacs	4:32
11.	"Live Like a Beast"	Mate Molnar	Gabor Kovacs	3:42
12.	"Marching for Liberty"	Mate Molnar	Gabor Kovacs	8:08
Total length:				46:25

== Personnel ==
=== Wisdom ===
- Gabor Nagy - lead vocals
- Gabor Kovacs - guitar
- Mate Bodor - guitar
- Mate Molnar - bass guitar
- Balazs Agota - drums

=== Additional performers ===
- Fabio Lione - additional lead vocals on "Marching For Liberty"
- A la cARTe choir - choir

=== Production ===
- Gabor Kovacs - executive producer, engineer, mastering
- Gabor Noniusz - engineer
- Gyula Havancsak - cover concept, graphics
- Wisdom photo studio - band photos
