= Wisdom (band) =

Hungarian power metal band

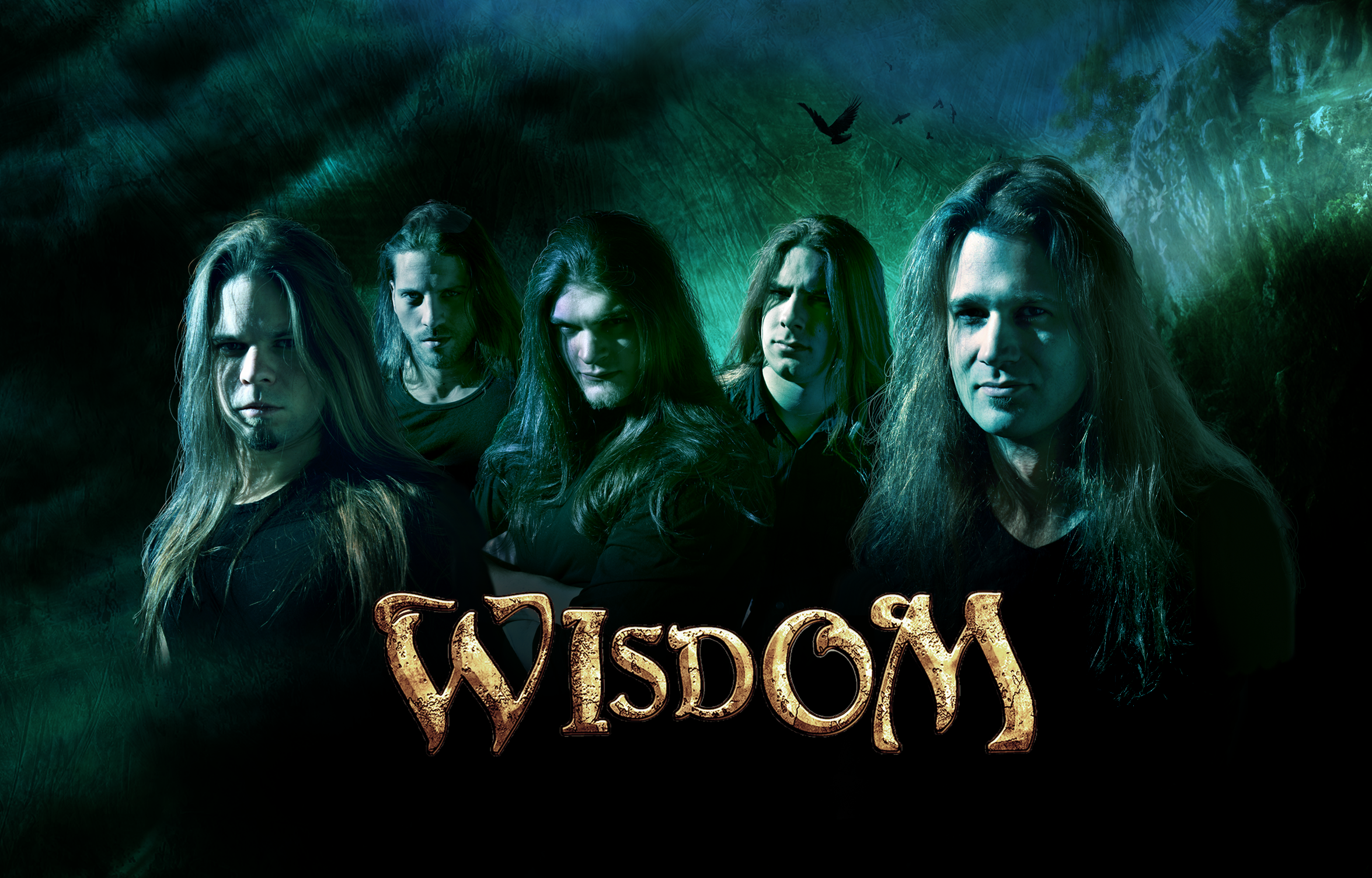
- Wisdom in 2013

Background information
- Origin: Hungary
- Genres: Power metal
- Years active: 2001–2018
- Labels: Noise Art (worldwide); CdInZane LLC (America); Spinning (Japan); Hammer (Hungary)
- Past members: Gabor Nagy; Gabor Kovacs; Anton Kabanen; Mate Molnar; Balazs Agota; Zsolt Galambos; Peter Kern; Istvan Nachladal; Csaba Czebely; Balazs Hornyak
- Website: www.wisdom.hu

Wisdom was a Hungarian power metal band from Budapest. Formed in autumn 2001, the group was known for its practice of basing each song on a well-known quotation. Many of the band's lyrics and all of the album covers center on the story of an old man, a cult figure called Wiseman.

== Biography ==
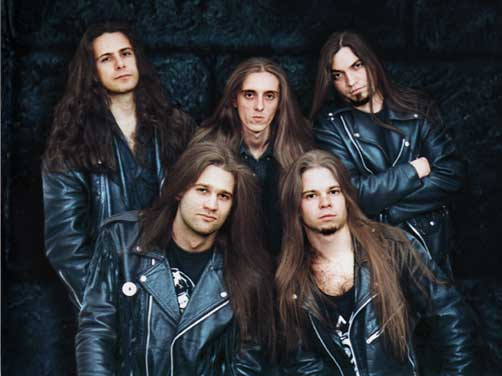
Wisdom - Early days

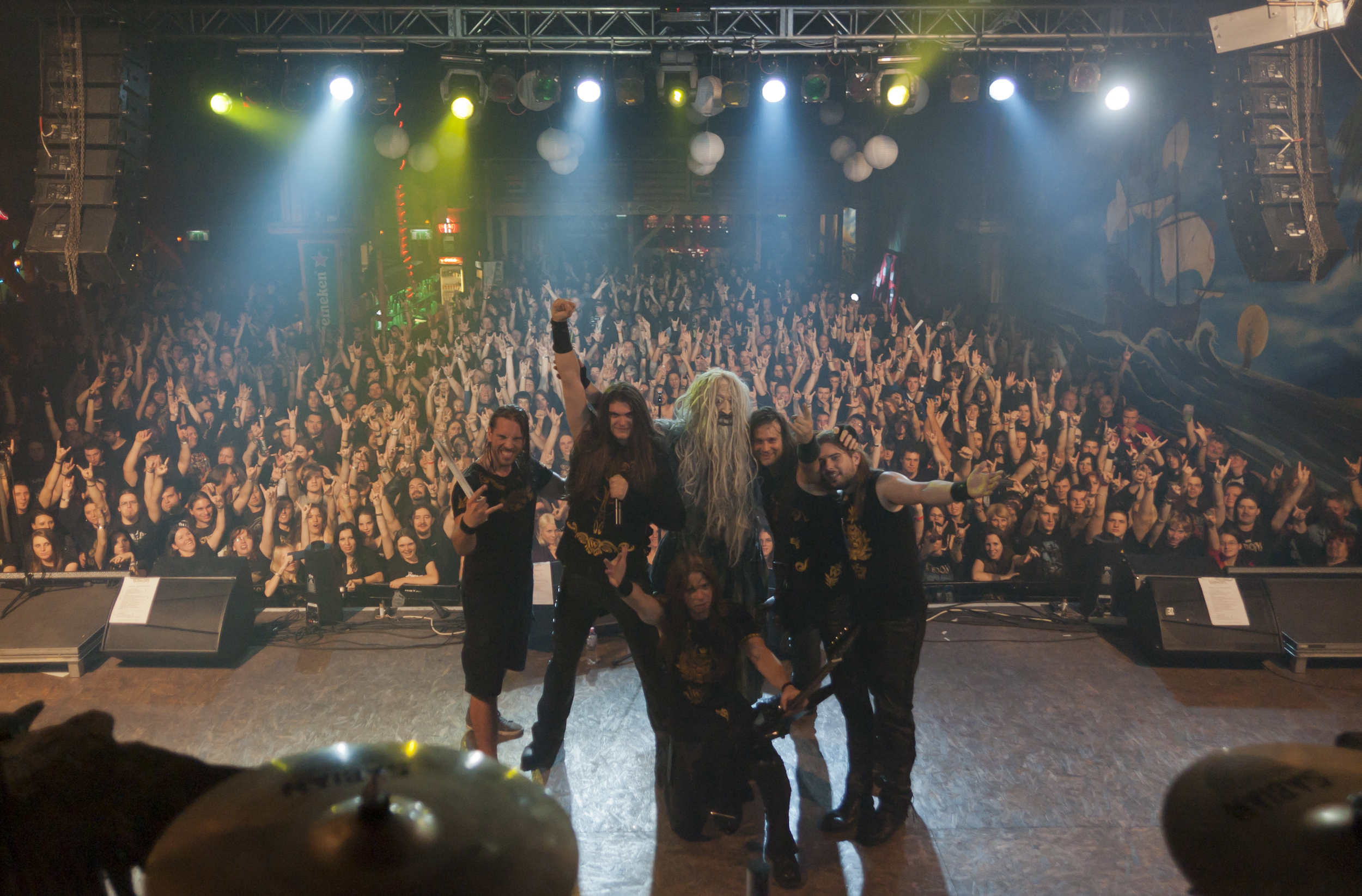
Keep Wiseman Alive 2013

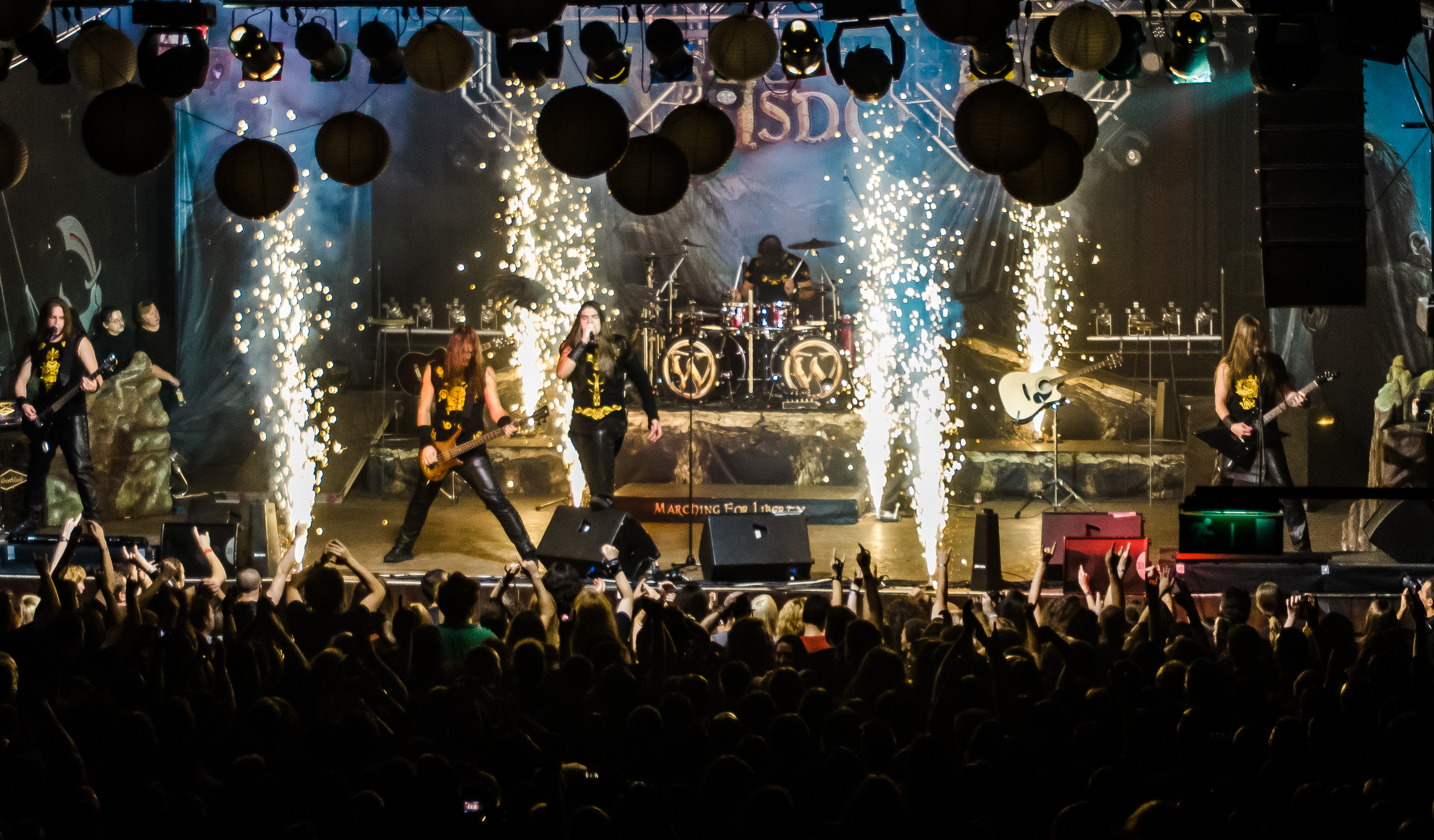
Wisdom on stage in 2013

Fate
A brief sample of the first track from the Wisdom EP.

Judas
A brief sample of the last track from the Judas album.

Marching For Liberty
A brief sample of the last track from the Marching For Liberty album.

The band originally consisted of bass player Mate Molnar and guitarist Gabor Kovacs. Molnar was a fan of Kovacs' existing band Legendary, and the two agreed to form a new group together. They were later joined by Istvan Nachladal (Nahi) (vocals), Balazs Hornyak (drums) and Zsolt Galambos (guitar), who had also been a member of Legendary. The band was named after the 1986 film Wisdom.

Wisdom played their first concert in Miskolc in 2002. In they were featured as a support act in the 2003 Iron Maiden tour Give Me Ed... 'Til I'm Dead Tour. They subsequently featured in the motorcycle magazine Born To Be Wild, which led to increased public exposure. Wisdom performed as a warm-up act for Saxon and were the support act for the UDO-Doro tour.

Whilst on this tour the band was noticed by Ronny Milianowicz of Swedish/German band Dionysus, who arranged a record company offer which would release the first Wisdom record, a four-track single titled Wisdom EP released in July 2004. It was circulated as a free CD with the Hungarian music magazine Metal Hammer. During the process of recording, Hornyak left the group and was replaced by Csaba Czebely. After the release of the EP, Wisdom supported Europe and in early 2005 toured with the band Ossian.

Molnar wanted to build up a narrative world around the name Wisdom, based on Iron Maiden's Eddie or Megadeth's Vic. During the course of recording their first album, graphic designer Gyula Havancsak (Hjules) created the figure of Wiseman, who became the band's mascot. Each subsequent record released by Wisdom contained references to the character's biography. The band's first independent concert was held on 19 November 2005 in Budapest, and was called Keep Wiseman Alive. Originally a one-off gig, Keep Wiseman Alive ultimately evolved into an annual event. In 2006 Wisdom played as a warm up act for Helloween.

In 2006 the band's first LP, Words of Wisdom, was released under Hammer Records. Peter Kern had by this point replaced Csaba Czebely as the band's drummer. The album was mastered at Finnvox studios. Wisdom then signed to Soundholic Records for the album's Asian release.

Wisdom was nominated as a contender for Hungary's entry for the Eurovision Song Contest 2007, although they were not selected. In the spring of 2007, Wisdom embarked on a tour for the promotion of their own record, and also opened for Heaven and Hell at the Sziget Festival. During the tour, Nachladal left the band; Zoltan Kiss replaced him on vocals for their remaining concerts. After the release of the single "At The Gates"', the band took a hiatus from performing. Kern left the band due to health issues and was replaced on drums by Balazs Agota.

After two years, Wisdom returned to performing, playing as the opening act for Judas Priest. The band recruited new vocalist Gabor Nagy in 2010 and released a new studio album, Judas, in April 2011. In order to promote the new album, Wisdom went on to tour in the fall of 2010; Nagy wore a mask for all the gig appearances as a promotional stunt. The album featured Mats Levén (Therion and Malmsteen) as guest vocalist. Japan's Spinning Records and United States' CD InZane LLC subsequently released Judas.

In autumn the band shot a new video for a track called "Heaven and Hell". The shooting took place Festetics family's castle of Dég. At this time the band celebrated its 10th anniversary with a tour they named Wise Years, which concluded with their annual Keep Wiseman Alive concert in Budapest.

In 2012 the band were signed by booking agency Rock the Nation and record company NoiseArt Records. Galambos left the band and was replaced on guitar by Mate Bodor. In August the album Judas was released worldwide, and to promote it the band joined Sabaton on their Swedish Empire Tour.

On 27 September 2013, the band's third album was released titled Marching For Liberty. It was distributed internationally through NoiseArt records. The album entered the official Hungarian Album Charts (Mahasz) at number 1. Fabio Lione (Rhapsody, Vision Divine, Kamelot Angra) sang several parts in the title song. Immediately after the new release, the band started touring in Western Europe alongside Powerwolf. At the 7th annual Keep Wiseman Alive show, Powerwolf performed as the guest act.

On 1 April 2018 the band announced that they were splitting up. Nevertheless, they still planned to record and release a fifth studio album.

== Band members ==
Final lineup

- Gábor Nagy - lead vocals (2010–2018)
- Gábor Kovács - guitar, backing vocals (2001–2018)
- Anton Kabanen - guitar (2015–2018)
- Máté Molnár - bass guitar (2001–2018)
- Tamás Tóth - drums (2014–2018)

Former

- Balázs Ágota - drums (2008–2014)
- Máté Bodor - guitar (2012–2015)
- Zsolt Galambos - guitar (2001–2012)
- István Nachladal - lead vocals (2001–2007)
- Péter Kern - drums (2006–2008)
- Csaba Czébely - drums (2004–2005)
- Balázs Hornyák - drums (2001–2003)

== Discography ==
- Wisdom EP (2004)
- Words of Wisdom (2006)
- At the Gates EP (2007)
- Judas (2011)
- Marching for Liberty (2013)
- Rise of the Wise (2016)
