= Cypher (Spektr album) =

Studio album by Spektr
- Released: 2013
- Genres: Black metal, black ambient
- Length: 45:51
- Label: Agonia

Spektr chronology
| Near Death Experience (2006) | Cypher (2013) | The Art to Disappear (2016) |

Cypher is the third album by the experimental black metal band Spektr, via Agonis Records. It was released on February 5, 2013, in Europe and February 19, 2013, in North America.

== Reception ==
Professional ratings
Review scores
| Source | Rating |
|---|---|
| Metal Hammer | 3.5/5 stars |
| PopMatters | 7/10 stars |
| Punknews.org | 2.5/5 stars |

Punknews.org rated the album two and a half stars, noting "With Cypher, SPEKTR attempt to make black metal for people who don't like black metal." PopMatters gave it a rating score of seven and remarked, "Cypher is replete with effects and distorting sounds that make the journey fraught with confusion." The album was rated three and a half stars by Metal Hammer, which stated, "Cypher takes on a cast of diseased urban psychosis where all the familiar surfaces of the world give way to reveal the ‘ineffable terror’ beyond."

== Track listing ==
| No. | Title | Length |
|---|---|---|
| 1. | "Hermetism" | 1:22 |
| 2. | "Teratology" | 9:39 |
| 3. | "The Singularity" | 8:14 |
| 4. | "Solitude" | 1:40 |
| 5. | "Antimatter" | 6:09 |
| 6. | "Solve Et Coagula" | 2:42 |
| 7. | "Cypher" | 11:15 |
| 8. | "Decorporation" | 1:15 |
| 9. | "Le Vitriol Du Philosophe" | 3:35 |
| Total length: | | 45:51 |

== Personnel ==
- kl.K. (aka Krig) - drums, vocals, samples, programming
- Hth - guitars, bass, vocals, samples, programming
