= Hybrid (Spanish band) =

Spanish extreme metal band

- Origin: Madrid, Spain
- Genres: Avant-garde metal Extreme metal Progressive metal Technical death metal
- Years active: 2004-2013
- Label: Eyesofsound
- Members: Chus Maestro; Antonio Sánchez; Iván Durán
- Past members: Unai García; J. Oliver; Miguel; Kike; Albano Fortes; Iago Fuentes; Rafa Fernández
- Website: myspace.com/hybridmetal

Hybrid was an extreme metal band formed in 2004 by musicians from other Madrid acts.

== Biography ==
Hybrid was formed in March 2004 when Chus Maestro (One Last Word, Supra and formerly in Another Kind Of Death) recruited members from Human Mincer and Wormed to form an extreme metal band. With Kike and Unai García, they wrote songs and recorded them in June 2005 as the band's debut EP, Beyond Undeniable Entropy, a six-song MCD of avant-garde, eclectic math metal, released the following year by Deadwrong Records.

The band played live with Tool and Deftones at the Festimad Sur'06, as well as with Napalm Death, Cephalic Carnage, Textures, Misery Index Moho, Machetazo and Looking For An Answer, among others.

In 2007, Hybrid entered Sadman Studio to record their first full-length album, The 8th Plague, mastered by Alan Douches (Mastodon, The Dillinger Escape Plan) with artwork by Seldon Hunt (Isis, Neurosis). The 8th Plague was released by English label Eyesofsound in August 2008.

The band wrote material for a release scheduled for 2012. A live version of one of the songs to be released was added to YouTube on March 28, 2011.

== Musical style ==
Hybrid's music starts from a combination of technical death metal and avant-garde extreme metal in which they merge a big bunch of influences and nuances from diverse styles such as mathcore, grindcore, black metal, doom, crust and also free jazz and Latin music. They normally use odd time signatures, dissonances, polyrhythms, staccato riffing, blast beats, cuts, changes and contrasts that increase the unpredictableness of their music. Their composing method is based on the improvisation and the creative freedom. The band is also known for using different vocal ranges.

== Lyrical content ==
Hybrid lyrics cover philosophical, sociological and spiritual themes from an apocalyptic, misanthropic and nihilistic point of view. The lyrics are written using metaphors and including references to The Bible, mythology, religion, mysticism, occultism, and psychology.

== Members ==
- Chus Maestro – drums, vocals (2004–2013)
- Iván Durán – guitar (2008–2013)
- Antonio Sanchez – guitar (2008–2013)

=== Past members ===
- Enrique Maroto – bass (2004–2008)
- Javier Oliver – guitar, vocals (2004–2008)
- Miguel Frutos – guitar, vocals (2004–2008)
- Unai García – vocals (2004–2007)
- Albano Fortes – vocals (2007–2008)
- Iago Fuentes – bass (2008–2009)
- Rafael Fernández– vocals (2008–2010)
- Alfonso Vicente – bass (2009–2011)

== Discography ==
=== Studio albums ===
- The 8th Plague (album) (2008)
- Angst (2013)

=== EPs ===
- Beyond Undeniable Entropy (2006)

=== Compilations ===
- Antichristmass Fest 2005 (Mondongo Caníbale, 2005)
- Xtreemities Vol. 6 (Xtreem Music, 2006)
- Madtaste Vol. 3 (Sur Music, 2006)
- 22 Dósis de Psicoactivación (Rompiendo Records, 2007)
- Fear Candy Vol. 58 (Terrorizer, 2008)
- Spain Kills. Vol 8 (Xtreem Music, 2007)
- Various Sampler 2008 (Eyesofsound, 2008)
