= Sonic Reign =

German black metal band

Sonic Reign is a German black metal band consisting of two members: Ben (vox, strings) and Sebastian (drums). The band plays a modern variant of black metal influenced by bands such as Satyricon, Emperor and Thorns.

The band was initially formed in 1997 under the name of Megiddo, but began to use Sonic Reign in 1999.

Sonic Reign signed a deal with Metal Blade Records in December 2006. The first release in this collaboration is the re-release of the band's first album, Raw Dark Pure, which was originally released by the band's own label Sovereignty Productions on 21 July 2006.

== Discography ==
- 1999: A Journey (demo)
- 2002: The Decline Portrait (demo)
- 2004: The Decline Portrait (promo)
- 2006: Raw Dark Pure
- 2013: Monument In Black
