= Newsted =

American heavy metal band

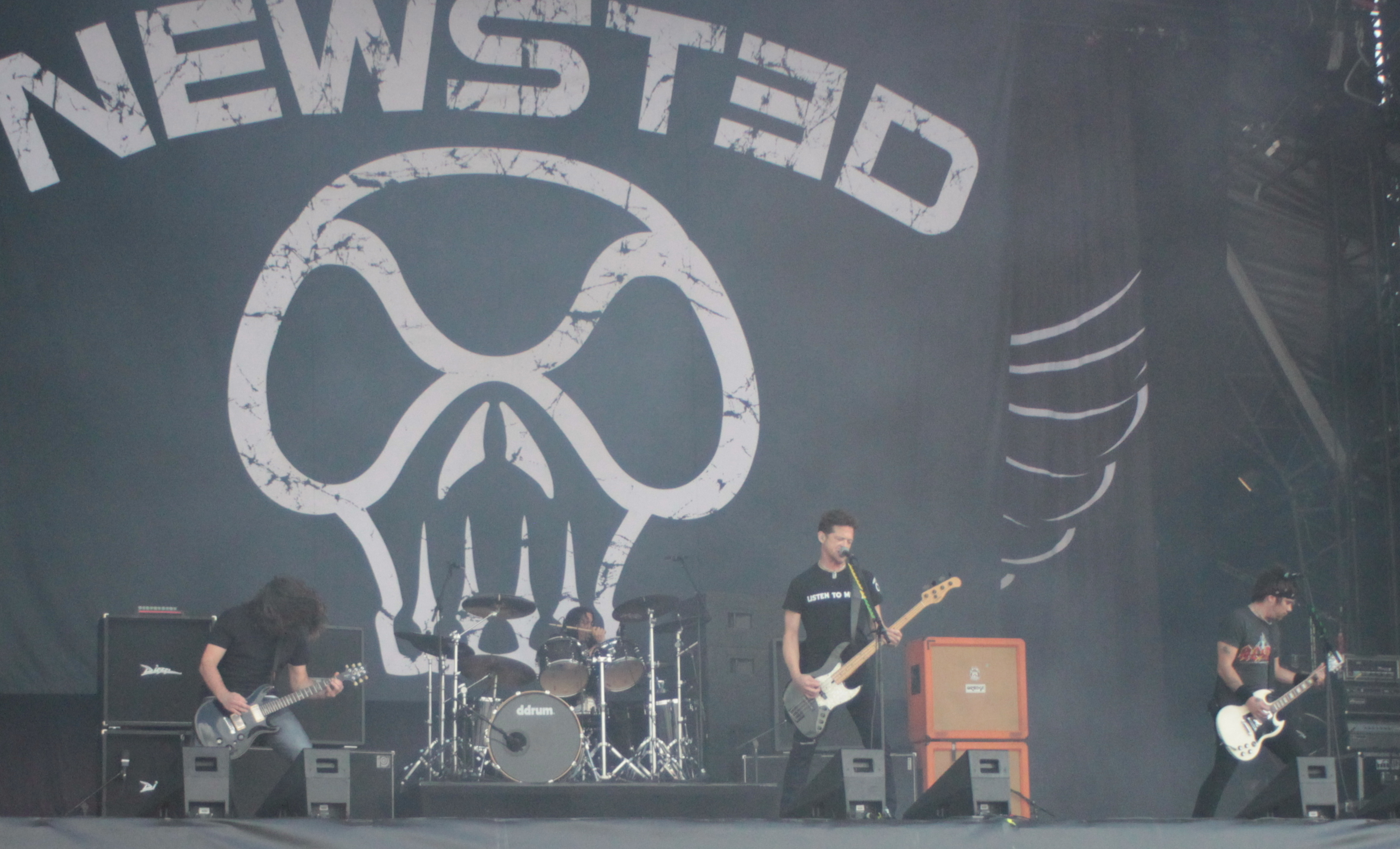
- Newsted performing at Hellfest 2013

Background information
- Origin: Turlock, California, U.S.
- Genre: Heavy metal
- Years active: 2012–2014; 2023–present
- Label: Chophouse
- Members: Jason Newsted; Jessie Farnsworth; Jesus Mendez, Jr.; Humberto Perez
- Past members: Mike Mushok

Newsted is an American heavy metal band formed in October 2012. The first lineup was led by Jason Newsted (former member of Metallica, Flotsam and Jetsam, and Voivod) on bass and lead vocals, along with drummer Jesus Mendez Jr., guitarist Jessie Farnsworth, with Staind guitarist Mike Mushok joining in 2013. The band released the four-song EP Metal (recorded before Mushok had joined) on January 8, 2013, and followed up with the full-length debut album Heavy Metal Music on August 6, 2013. Guitarist Mushok stated that there were no plans for the band to regroup for any further touring or recording, explaining that Jason Newsted "shut down" the project in early 2014. Prior to revealing this, the band was set to perform at the Soundwave festival in Australia throughout February and March that year which they cancelled their appearance at bringing their touring and activity at the time to a halt. Newsted broke silence in 2016 to explain having been overwhelmed with projects.

In April 2023, Newsted announced reactivating the band with a new show on May 20 at Revolution Live in Fort Lauderdale, Florida. The band, featuring new guitarist Humberto Perez replacing Mushok, played their first show since August 2013, on May 20, 2023, at Revolution Live in Fort Lauderdale, Florida, featuring four old Newsted songs, Metallica, Motörhead and Ted Nugent covers and debuting 12 new songs.

== Band members ==
=== Current ===
- Jason Newsted – bass, lead vocals, additional guitar (2012–2014, 2023–present)
- Jessie Farnsworth – lead guitar (2012–2013), rhythm guitar, backing vocals, occasional bass (2012–2014, 2023–present)
- Jesus Mendez Jr. – drums, percussion (2012–2014, 2023–present)
- Humberto Perez – lead guitar (2023–present)

=== Former ===
- Mike Mushok – lead guitar (2013–2014)

== Discography ==
=== Albums ===
Year	Album	Peak chart positions					
Year	Album	AUT	FRA	SWE	SWI	UK	US
2013	Heavy Metal Music	20	130	42	15	71	40

=== EPs ===
Year	Album	Peak chart positions	
Year	Album	UK	US
2013	Metal	–	62
