= Vexovoid =

Studio album by Portal
- Released: February 19, 2013
- Genre: Death metal; avant-garde metal; black metal
- Length: 34:03
- Label: Profound Lore

Portal chronology
Swarth (2009)	Vexovoid (2013)	Ion (2018)

Vexovoid is the fourth full-length album by Australian extreme metal band Portal. It was released on February 19, 2013 through Profound Lore Records. The band's guitarist, Horror Illogium, has described the album as "the evolution by sickness, the advancement by mutation where all has become clear, the third eye open, think tanks in construct." The album received positive reviews from music critics, and was notably reviewed by the New York Times.

== Release and promotion ==
NPR Music streamed the song "The Back Wards" in advance of the album's release, commenting that "this is the stuff of Dario Argento's surrealist horror films, pounded into the clearest-sounding Portal album yet, as if stripping away the murk for something that much more terrifying." Pitchfork also streamed the track 'Curtain', writing that "for the six minutes, as long-running Australian crew Portal twist time and again from death metal build to black metal blur to noise rock distortion, the song remains enormous and crushing." A music video for the song 'Curtain' was released in October 2013, directed by Zev Deans. The concept for the video was loosely adapted from Edgar Allan Poe's poem "The Conqueror Worm."

== Musical style ==
In their review of the album, The New York Times noted that Vexovoid represents a further incremental development in Portal's sound, writing that "Each one reinvents the guitar tone; what you hear on “Vexovoid,” from the guitarists Horror Illogium and Aphotic Mote, is clearer and more elegant, a little less scoured and crackly. The drum sound is deeper, more resonant, with more midrange. We’re talking small but important increments, but this is moving toward traditional rock values." They went on to write that on a structural level, "It sounds upside-down and backward. Most Portal songs are loosely connected chains of arrangements; the unity is not on the song level but on the largest level, the band’s constant use of certain modes and rhythmic patterns. You don’t remember how the songs go, but you do remember their weird feeling, their atmosphere. Every beat is articulated, and because of the upward guitar strokes and the fast, ungainly drumbeat combinations, the rhythm sounds like rising rather than landing — as if the beats were being pulled upward out of the drums."

Pitchfork noted in their review the unsettling, dissonant character of the album, writing that "the expected shapes have been mutated and multiplied into orders so strange they seem surreal. Rhythms stay the course where you expect them to shift before finally switching without warning. Sharp-barbed riffs emerge from and climb above dins that once seemed irreparably unordered. Songs that, for the first minute, appeared to have but one aim and direction find a half-dozen new missions and vectors in a five-minute span." They also noted the wide-ranging influences beyond those typical for a death metal album, including doom metal, black metal, and noise rock. Spin wrote that "Where black metal conjures symphonic whirlwinds of minor-key mayhem and death metal froths with jagged pessimism, Portal have found a middle ground where all forms of extreme negativity work in concert."

== Critical reception ==
Professional ratings
Aggregate scores
Source	Rating
Metacritic	76/100
Review scores
Source	Rating
About.com	4.5/5 stars
Decibel Magazine	9/10 stars
Exclaim!	9/10 stars
Pitchfork	8/10 stars
Spin	7/10
Tiny Mix Tapes	4/5 stars

Vexovoid was met with positive reviews from music critics. At Metacritic (a review aggregator site which assigns a normalized rating out of 100 from music critics), based on 7 critics, the album has received a score of 76/100, which indicates "generally favorable reviews". The album has been noted for providing clearer production values than heard on previous albums, which renders the band's "intricacies...more apparent" without detracting from the band's mysterious qualities, which were described as a "temple to the inscrutable". Writing for Decibel Magazine, Rod Smith concurred, noting that, with Vexovoid, "Portal retire the idiosyncratic production style that had people mentioning vacuum cleaners and wind tunnels...The added clarity imparts a new sense of urgency" to the band's approach. Pitchfork praised the album's depth and complexity despite its short runtime, describing it as "meticulous" and "merciless". Tiny Mix Tapes emphasised the album's Lovecraftian and horror-related themes, describing the album as "a temple to the inscrutable, and the geometries and inscriptions featured in its blueprints seem inked in a language only accessible to those whose sanity the Old Ones have already shattered." They went on to write that "It’s Portal’s ability to invoke the strange aeons beyond death that makes their music so uncannily horrific. Their death metal refuses to stop at death and continues even deeper into the darkness."

== Track listing ==
No.	Title	Length
1.	"Kilter"	5:46
2.	"The Back Wards"	4:16
3.	"Curtain"	5:57
4.	"Plasm"	5:47
5.	"Awryeon"	4:21
6.	"Orbmorphia"	2:40
7.	"Oblotten"	5:16
Total length:		34:03

== Personnel ==
Personnel adapted from AllMusic credits.

=== Portal ===
- The Curator – vocals
- Horror Illogium – lead guitar
- Aphotic Mote – rhythm guitar
- Ignis Fatuus – drums
- Omenous Fugue – bass guitar

=== Additional personnel ===
- Kriss Hades – artwork
- Nihilistic WarFucker - additional graphics
- Industrie Chimère Noire - additional graphics, design
