= Portal (band) =

Australian extreme metal band

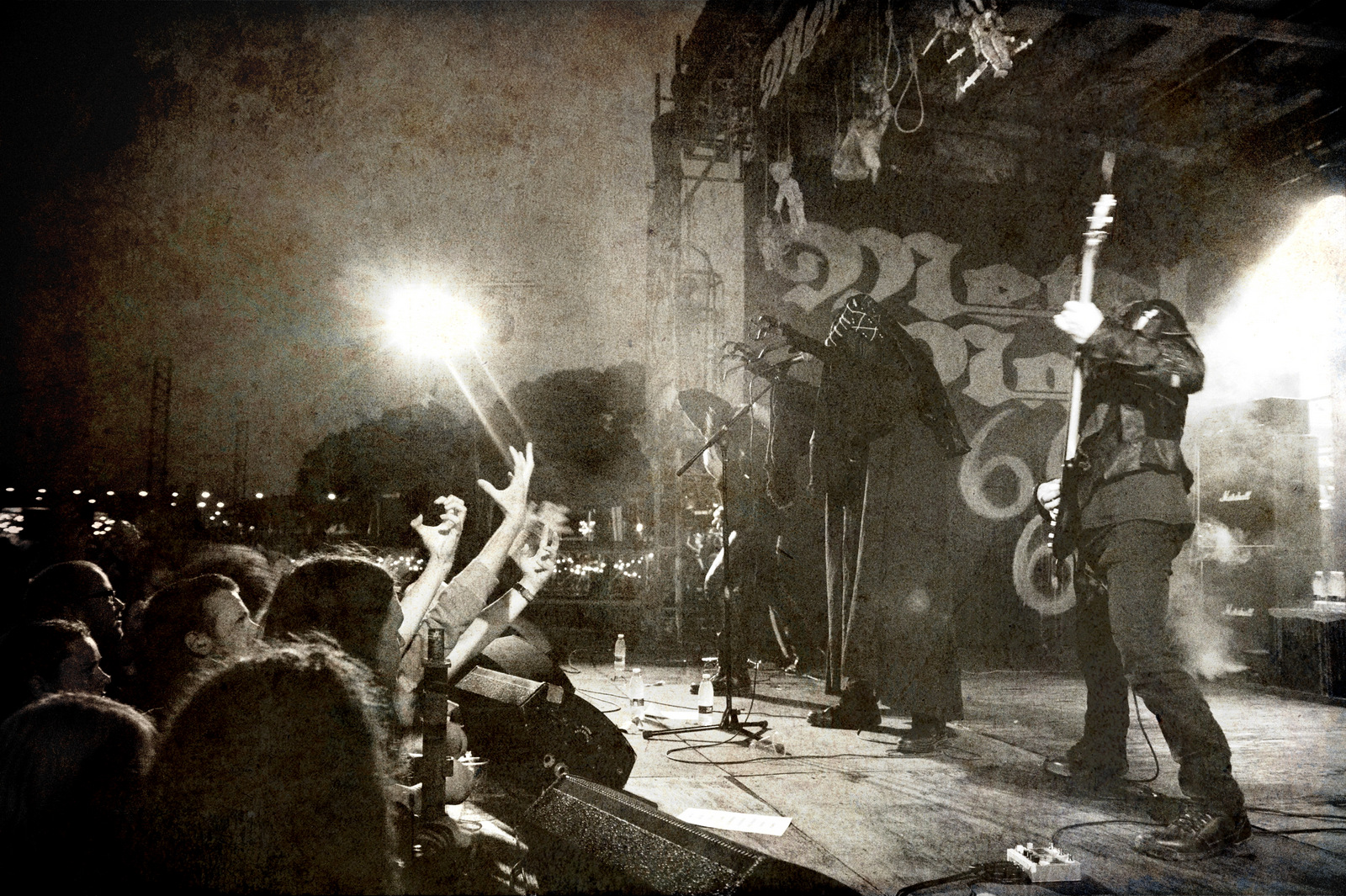
- Portal at Metal Magic Festival in 2013

Background information
- Origin: Brisbane, Queensland, Australia
- Genres: Death metal; black metal; avant-garde metal; progressive metal
- Years active: 1994–present
- Label: Profound Lore

Portal is an Australian extreme metal band that blends death metal, black metal, dark ambient and experimental music. Their style features distorted guitar riffs, down-tuned rhythms, and vocals ranging from "menacing, echoing" sound effects to death grunts.

Adrien Begrand of Popmatters noted that "death metal always pretends to be scary, but [...] it's all rather harmless. That said, however, I make no mistake in saying that the death metal peddled by Australia's Portal is truly friggin' terrifying". Lead guitarist Horror Illogium has said Portal intends "to capture a cinematic horror scope". They have released seven full-length albums, as well as a number of EPs and split releases. Their most recent albums, Avow and Hagbulbia, were released in 2021 on Profound Lore Records.

== Musical style ==
Portal's main musical influences were Morbid Angel, Beherit, and Immolation. Decibel magazine described the band's style: "If Morbid Angel and Gorguts had birthed a German Expressionist child, that unholy creature would be Portal." The band has been praised for its "distant, obscure" interpretation of death metal. Denise Falzon, writing for Exclaim!, described Portal's 2004 EP, The Sweyy, as "extremely raw [...] with heavily distorted guitar riffs that aid in the album's overall chaotic and apocalyptic atmosphere". The band's style has been described as oriented around "constant dissonance", "sporadic compositions", and "abstract themes". Lead guitarist Horror Illogium has disputed that the band's songwriting lacks structure: "We are indeed making songs, although our structures are unusual. They are constructed with a great deal of artistic, obsessive scrutiny [...] An insane asylum is a structure; our songs can be viewed as structures housing insane elements".

Asked if Portal's exploration of extreme music could move beyond death metal, Horror Illogium said,

Portal explores depth and atmosphere in the aim of a descriptive soundscape. The term "extreme" would not really apply to us in the context that other bands would use: the fastest blastbeat or the most technical guitar work. That kind of mindframe as though it is a sport is sickening! Extreme for the sake of extreme in any regard has no place in our art. The feeling must flow, exploring different planes of darkness and atmosphere. There is no interest in taking the main core of Portal beyond Metal at all. In fact, we don't feel as though this form of Death Metal has reached its greatest potential yet.

While some critics have noted a "lack of production quality" and "unrefined, murky sound" on Portal's albums, Horror Illogium argued that the band spends considerable time consciously "exploring different equipment for guitar tones with enough articulation as well as dirt". Stating that "there are only so many frequencies that can share a space," he indicated that Portal's approach involved striking "a balance to allow the instruments to spill forth and explode when necessary. This will give a more detailed soundscape and accentuate the impact and depth of certain sections of music".

== Anonymity of the musicians ==
The band members obscure their identities and use stage names. They wear "suits and executioners' masks save for vocalist The Curator", who wears headgear fitting the theme of the latest album, such as "a huge, tattered wizard's hat that obscures his face" in the case of Seepia.

The idea for these costumes was developed by The Curator and Horror Illogium, who were inspired by fashion of the 1920s and imagery created by actor Lon Chaney Sr. in a few of his roles from the silent film era which, according to Horror Illogium, was the ideal figure that the band wanted to portray. The band's lead guitarist, Horror Illogium remarked that "anonymity has never been the modus operandi. It is the feeling we ourselves are subjected to, they [the costumes and stage names] serve as vessels for our escape". In an interview with underground media site Deaf Sparrow, Portal was interviewed entirely in character with the writer addressing them based on their anonymous personas.

== Lyrical themes and musical concepts ==
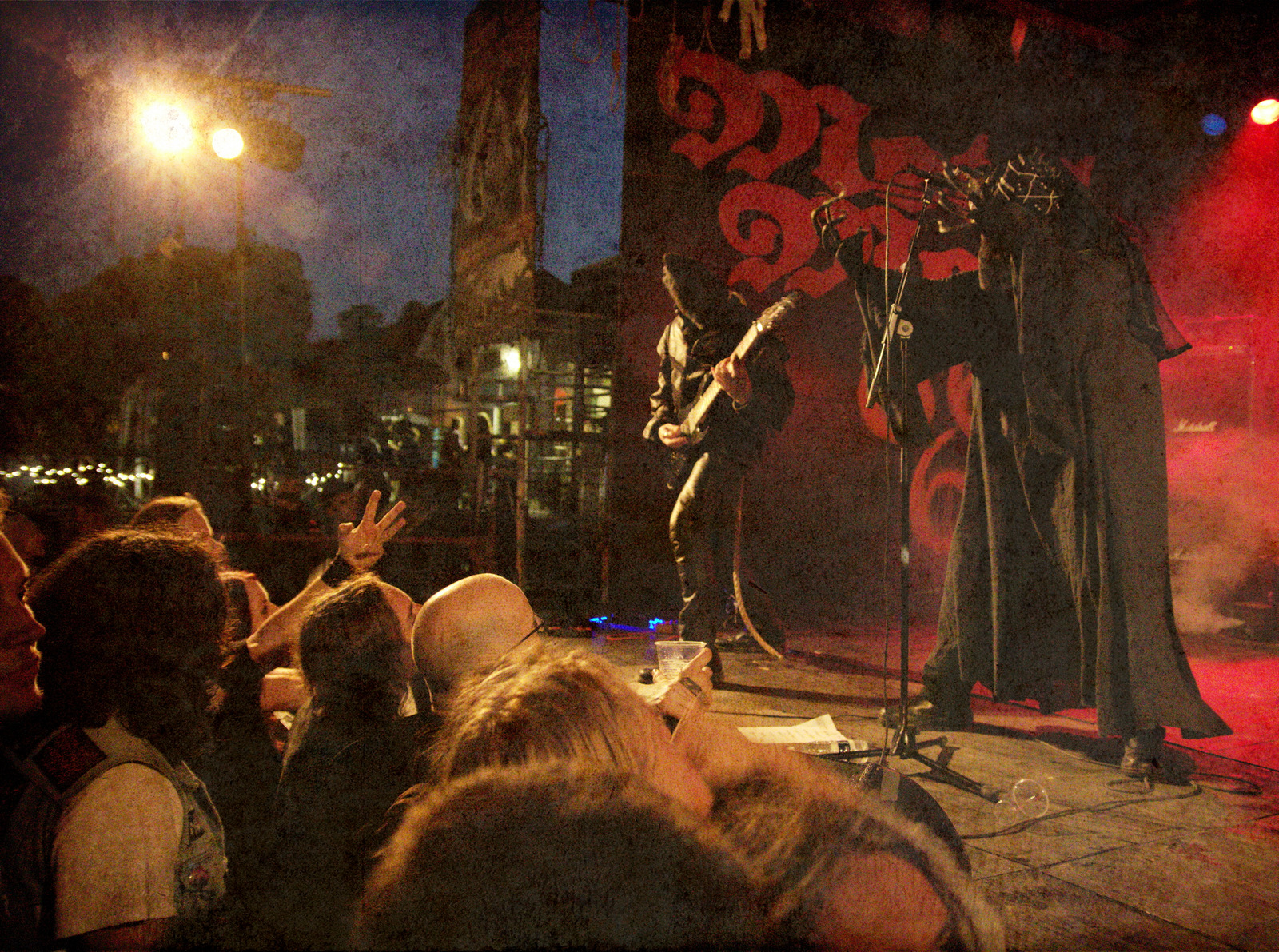
Portal in 2013

The band cites as inspiration for its lyrical themes the entities mentioned in Lovecraft Mythos, such as Nyarlathotep, Yog-Sothoth, Azathoth, and Cthulhu. According to a recent interview, however, their lore is deeply set in other writings. Guitarist Horror Illogium stated that Lovecraft was barely more than a mentioning in their early days, and they have since developed their own mythos. The Curator similarly said that Portal is "not a Lovecraftian Band. We only borrowed from the Mythos in our infancy and had reference themes on several tracks." Portal has defined this as the Olde Guarde, their 'sect' according to the interview, who promote ideas of the Vint-Age, which is Portal' usage of references to old technology, esoteric writings, and Victorian/Edwardian culture.

== Members ==
=== Current ===
- The Curator – vocals (1994–present)
- Horror Illogium – lead guitar (1994–present)
- Aphotic Mote – rhythm guitar (2003–present)
- Ignis Fatuus – drums (2007–present)
- Omenous Fugue – bass (2009–present)

=== Former ===
- Werm – bass (2002–2005)
- Mephitic – drums (2002–2005)
- Elsewhere – bass (2006)
- Monocular – drums (2006)
- Phathom Conspicuous – bass (2007–2008)

== Discography ==
=== Studio albums ===
- Seepia (2003)
- Outré (2007)
- Swarth (2009)
- Vexovoid (2013)
- ION (2018)
- Avow (2021)
- Hagbulbia (2021)

=== Extended plays ===
- The End Mills (2002)
- The Sweyy (2004)

=== Demos ===
- Portal (1998)
- Lurker at the Threshold (2006)
