= The Hutch =

Studio album by Steak Number Eight
- Released: 18 March 2013
- Genre: Sludge metal, post-rock
- Length: 71:51
- Label: Independent release
- Producer: Reinhard Vanbergen

Steak Number Eight chronology
All Is Chaos (2011)	The Hutch (2013)	Kosmokoma (2015)

Singles from The Hutch
- 1. "Black Eyed" Released: February 27, 2013

Professional ratings
Review scores
Source	Rating
Thrash Hits	5/6 stars
Sputnikmusic	4.5/5 stars

The Hutch is the third studio album by Belgian group Steak Number Eight, released throughout Spring 2013 in the Benelux (March 18), Norway (April 19) and Europe (April 22). The album is released on the back of extensive touring throughout Europe in support of second album All is Chaos, including on Metal Hammer's Razor Tour in the UK. The first song, "Black Eyed", was released on 27 February 2013. A full stream was released on De Standaard on March 11. The album reached #21 in the Belgian album charts.

== Track listing ==
No.	Title	Length
1.	"Cryogenius"	5:31
2.	"Black Eyed"	4:30
3.	"Photonic"	7:39
4.	"Push/Pull"	6:22
5.	"Pilgrimage of a Black Heart"	7:31
6.	"Exile of Our Marrow"	5:57
7.	"The Shrine"	6:52
8.	"Slumber"	5:02
9.	"Ashore"	4:07
10.	"Rust"	8:43
11.	"Tearwalker"	9:35
Total length:		71:51

Vinyl Bonus Track
No.	Title	Length
12.	"The Sea Is Dying"	9:29
Total length:		81:20

== Personnel ==
Steak Number Eight

- Brent Vanneste – guitars/vocals
- Joris Casier – drums
- Jesse Surmont – bass
- Cis Deman – guitars

Production

- Reinhard Vanbergen – production
- Matt Bayles – mixing
- Howie Weinberg – mastering

== Charts ==
=== Weekly charts ===
Chart (2013)	Peak position
Belgian Albums (Ultratop Flanders)	21

=== Year-end charts ===
Chart (2013)	Position
Belgian Albums (Ultratop Flanders)	162
