= Metal (EP) =

EP by Newsted
- Released: January 8, 2013
- Recorded: October 5−12, 2012 at the Creation Lab, Turlock, California
- Genre: Heavy metal
- Length: 22:08
- Label: Chophouse
- Producer: Jason Newsted

Newsted chronology
Metal (2013)	Heavy Metal Music (2013)

Professional ratings
Review scores
Source	Rating
Allmusic	3/5 stars
Consequence of Sound	3/5 stars

Metal is the debut EP by heavy metal band Newsted. The band was formed by American bassist Jason Newsted in 2012. The EP was released on January 8, 2013, under Newsted's own record label Chophouse Records. The EP was recorded at the Creation Lab studio in Turlock, California.

== Background ==
From 1986 until 2001, Jason Newsted was the bassist for heavy metal band Metallica. During the 1990s, he met drummer Jesus Mendez Jr., who helped out at the Metallica headquarters and later served as a drum tech on a tour for Newsted's former musical group Echobrain. In the late 2000s, Newsted met guitarist Jessie Farnsworth; the trio began working on music and writing songs. In the meantime, Jason Newsted was guest at Metallica's 30th-anniversary concert and performed onstage with the band. He said that those shows, along with the fans, inspired him to do another record.

Newsted began writing songs in August 2012, before giving them to Mendez Jr. and Farnsworth to learn. In October 2012, the band began recording songs and later recorded another set in December 2012. The band recorded a total of eleven songs which they planned to release during the first six months of 2013. The result would be the album Heavy Metal Music, released August 6, 2013.

The album was produced by Jason Newsted, with help from associate producer, Frank Munoz. The EP was recorded, mixed, and mastered by Anthony Focx at the Creation Lab Studio from October 5−12, 2012.

== Release ==
On November 15, 2012, Jason Newsted announced the launch of his official website for information on his projects. On November 16, 2012, Jason Newsted was interviewed on Eddie Trunk's Friday Night Rocks radio show. He revealed that he would be releasing music under his own self-named band.

On December 7, 2012, Newsted announced that his band was just finishing off their first record. On December 11, 2012, Newsted announced that the band had finished their first batch of songs, and that they were working on a second batch. On December 14, 2012, Newsted revealed the track listing and release date for a four-song debut EP, titled Metal, available on January 8, 2013, via iTunes. On December 15, 2012, a music video was filmed for the first song "Soldierhead". On December 17, 2012, "Soldierhead" premiered on the Eddie Trunk Live show on Sirius Satellite Radio. On January 10, 2013, Newsted announced that physical CDs of the EP would be available to order from January 15, 2013.

The album sold around 6,200 copies in its first week of release and debuted at number 62 on the U.S. Billboard 200. "Soldierhead" and "King of the Underdogs" were later featured on the album Heavy Metal Music's track listing while "Godsnake" and "Skyscraper" were made available as bonus tracks on Deluxe Editions of the album.

== Track listing ==
No.	Title	Length
1.	"Soldierhead"	4:16
2.	"Godsnake"	5:16
3.	"King of the Underdogs"	6:00
4.	"Skyscraper"	6:36
Total length:		22:08

== Personnel ==
Newsted

- Jason Newsted − bass, lead vocals, guitars
- Jessie Farnsworth − guitars, bass, backing vocals
- Jesus Mendez Jr. − drums, percussion

Technical personnel

- Jason Newsted − production
- Frank Munoz − additional production
- Anthony Focx − recording, mixing, mastering
- Chris Lascano − photography
- Mark Devito − cover layout and design

== Charts ==
Chart (2012)	Peak position
U.S. Billboard 200	62
