= Handful of Hate =

Italian black metal band

- Origin: Italy
- Genre: Black metal
- Years active: 1993–present
- Label: Code 666 Records

Handful of Hate is an Italian black metal band active since 1993. They have released seven studio albums, Qliphothic Supremacy, Hierarchy 1999, Vicecrown, Gruesome Splendour, You Will bleed, To Perdition and Adversus.

== Biography ==
Handful of Hate started in 1993. After line-up difficulties, they released their first demo, Goetia Summa, in 1995. They played several live shows in northern Italy before signing to a record label in 1996. They released Qliphothic Supremacy and toured Italy. In 1999, the band released Hierarchy 1999. The music was faster and more aggressive. Lyrics dealt with sexual, fetish, and carnal concepts. This album drew attention to the band. After the tour, they signed to Swedish label Downfall Records. The 7-inch Death from Above was released in 2001. They signed with Code7 Management in October 2002. The Production of the Death from Above is cleaner than previous recordings. Code666 Records released the double compilation Better Undead Than Alive, which included one track from Death from Above in 2002.

In October 2003, the band released Vicecrown. This album included many stylistic changes. In November of that year, they released the 7-inch EP Scorn and Conquest on Warlord Records. This album includes unreleased songs and an Impaled Nazarene Cover. They released the EP Blood Calls Blood, which features two unreleased songs and the tracks "Death from Above" and "The World is Prey" from the Death from Above promo. They describe their music as "Carnival Black Metal". In 2012, they released To Perdition. They are known for touring Europe, often supported by members of the Italian black metal scene such as Veratrum.

== Line-up ==
- Nicola Bianchi - vocals, guitar
- Andrea Toto - guitar
- Luca Buti - bass
- Aeternus - drums

== Former members ==
- Ugo Pandolfini - Bass
- Adriano Di Ricco - Bass
- Enrico Santi - Bass
- Matteo Fantozzi - Bass
- Damiano Michetti - Bass
- Andrea Zannoni - Guitar
- Luciano Zella - Guitar
- Marco Mazzoni - Guitar
- Claudio Alcara - Guitar
- Geny - Guitar
- J.M. - Drums
- Gionata Potenti - Drums
- Andrea Bianchi - Drums

== Discography ==
- Goetia Summa (demo), 1995
- Qliphothic Supremacy (album), 1997
- Hierarchy 1999 (album), 1999
- "Death from Above" (single), 2001
- Vicecrown (album), 2003
- "Scorn and Conquest" (single), 2003
- Blood Calls Blood (mini-album), 2004
- Gruesome Splendour (album), 2006
- You Will Bleed (album), 2009
- To Perdition (album), 2012
- Adversus (album), 2019
