= Fearless (S7N album) =

Studio album by S7N
- Released: November 25, 2013
- Recorded: 04–May 2013
- Studio: TRM Lab in Mexico City
- Genre: Heavy metal, Thrash metal
- Length: 26:41
- Label: Intolerancia
- Producer: Erik Canales

S7N chronology
Fearless (2013)	Deadline (2016)

Singles from Fearless
- 1. "Blackout" Released: June 24, 2014; 2. "Double Dealing" Released: May 12, 2015

Fearless is the debut studio album by the Mexican heavy metal band S7N, released on November 25, 2013. Fearless produced two singles, considered the most well-known songs from the band, "Blackout" and "Double Dealing". In 2014, the album was nominated for Best Metal Album in Mexico's Independent Music Awards.

== Production and promotion ==
The band recorded the album in TRM Lab in Mexico City during April and May 2013. The album was produced by Allison's singer Erik Canales, who also participated with arrangements.

=== Singles ===
The band's debut single "Blackout" was released on June 24, 2014, with a music video directed by Cheeno Mesdrage. "Blackout" gave the band national media attention, leading S7N to perform as opening acts for Havok, Ghost, and Napalm Death. Later that year, the band released an acoustic version, dubbed "Blackoustic", as a single via Bandcamp. In 2015, "Blackout" featured in Netflix's Club de Cuervos first season's episode 7, Nuestro Guggenheim.

The second single "Double Dealing" was released on May 12, 2015, again with a music video by Mesdrage. Reina El Metal ranked it second on its list of "The 10 Most Outstanding Mexican Metal Videoclips of 2015".

== Reception ==
Professional ratings
Review scores
Source	Rating
Rolling Stone	3.5/4 stars
Pure Grain Audio	8.5/10 stars
Metal Temple	8/10 stars

Fearless received positive reviews from music critics. Bruce Moore from Pure Grain Audio praised the album's "killer yet tasteful riffage, intense shredding guitar solos, chugging rhythms and an overall rawness." Amy Ocha of Rolling Stone Mexico compared the album with Metallica's Ride The Lightning.

== Track listing ==
No.	Title	Length
1.	"Enemies"	3:47
2.	"Burn My Pain Away"	3:28
3.	"Blackout"	4:08
4.	"Double Dealing"	4:01
5.	"Fearless"	2:47
6.	"Sins"	4:15
7.	"Gift of the Strong"	3:57
Total length:		26:41

== Personnel ==
S7N

- Mao Kanto – lead vocals, rhythm guitar
- Guillermo García – lead guitar, backing vocals
- Israel Monroy – lead guitar, backing vocals
- Lalo Olvera – bass guitar
- Fabián Carreño – drums

Production

- Erik Canales – producer, arrangements
- Juan Martín Macías – engineer
- Daniel Amaya – mixing
- Karla Farrugia – cover art
