= Stake (band) =

Belgian post-metal band

STAKE
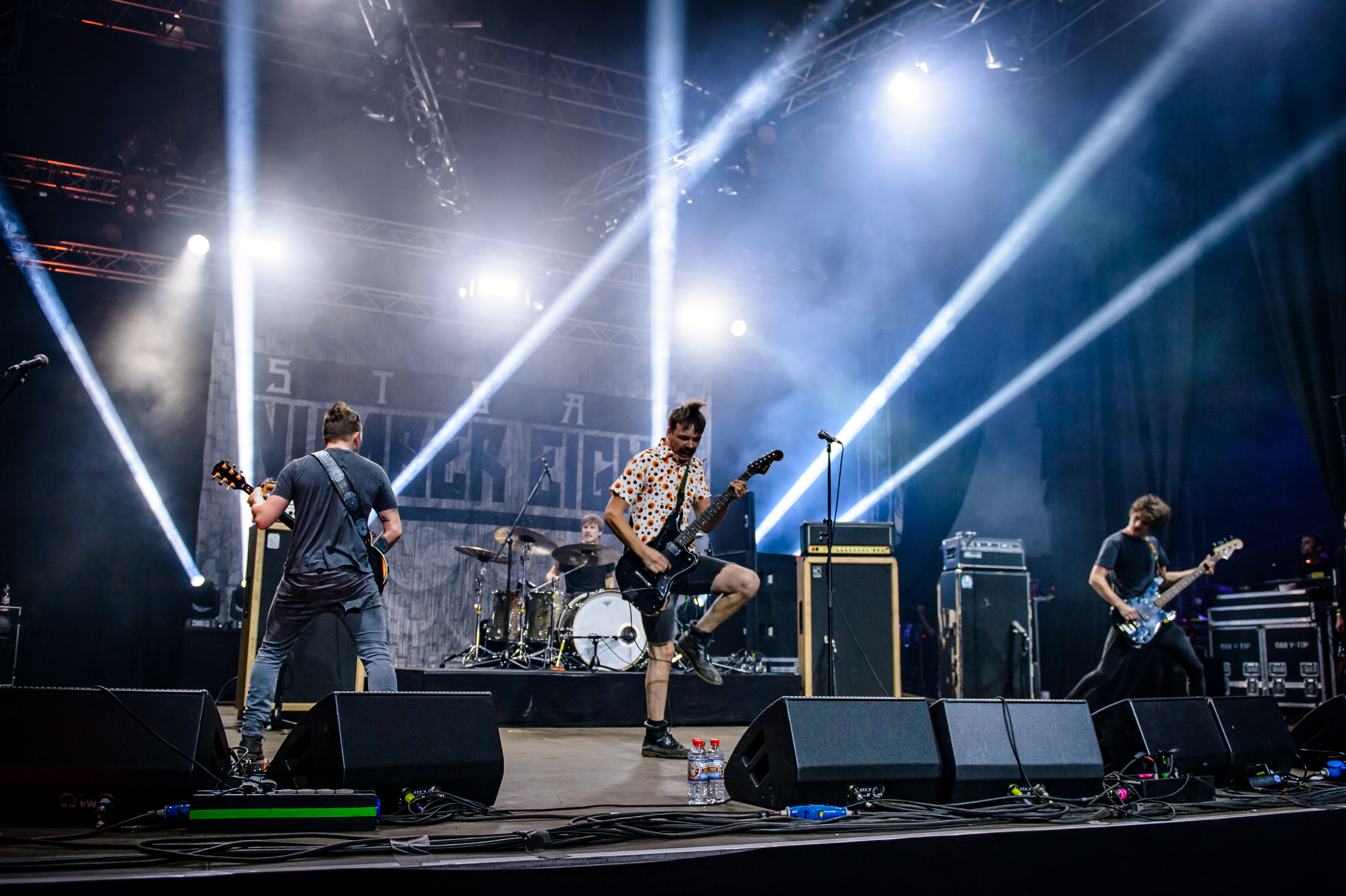
- Stake at Wacken Open Air 2017

Background information
- Also known as: Steak Number Eight (2004–2018)
- Origin: Wevelgem, Belgium
- Genres: Post-metal, sludge metal
- Years active: 2004–present
- Labels: Play It Again Sam
- Members: Joris Casier; Cis Deman; Jesse Surmont; Brent Vanneste
- Past members: Louis Provost
- Website: stakeband.com

Stake (stylized in all caps), formerly known as Steak Number Eight, is a Belgian post-metal/sludge metal band based in Wevelgem. Their music is influenced by bands like Pelican, Isis, Sunn O))) and Amenra.

== Career ==
In 2007 they won a local contest named Westtalent. A few months later, in March 2008, the band won Humo's Rock Rally. With an average age of 15.5 they were the youngest band in the history of this contest. Shortly after this victory a home recorded album When the Candle Dies Out... was released.

In March 2011 the band released their second album All is Chaos produced by Mario Goossens and mixed by Matt Bayles. The album received overwhelmingly positive feedback and was later released in 2012 in the UK by Metal Hammer, who then added the band to their Razor Tour at the end of the year. In March and April their third album, The Hutch, was released across Europe. One week before its Belgian release, De Standaard posted an online stream of the full album.

In 2018, they changed their name to Stake.

== Discography ==
- When the Candle Dies Out... (2008)
- All Is Chaos (2011)
- The Hutch (2013)
- Kosmokoma (2015)
- Critical Method (2019)
- Love, Death and Decay (2022)
