= Crystallion =

German power metal band

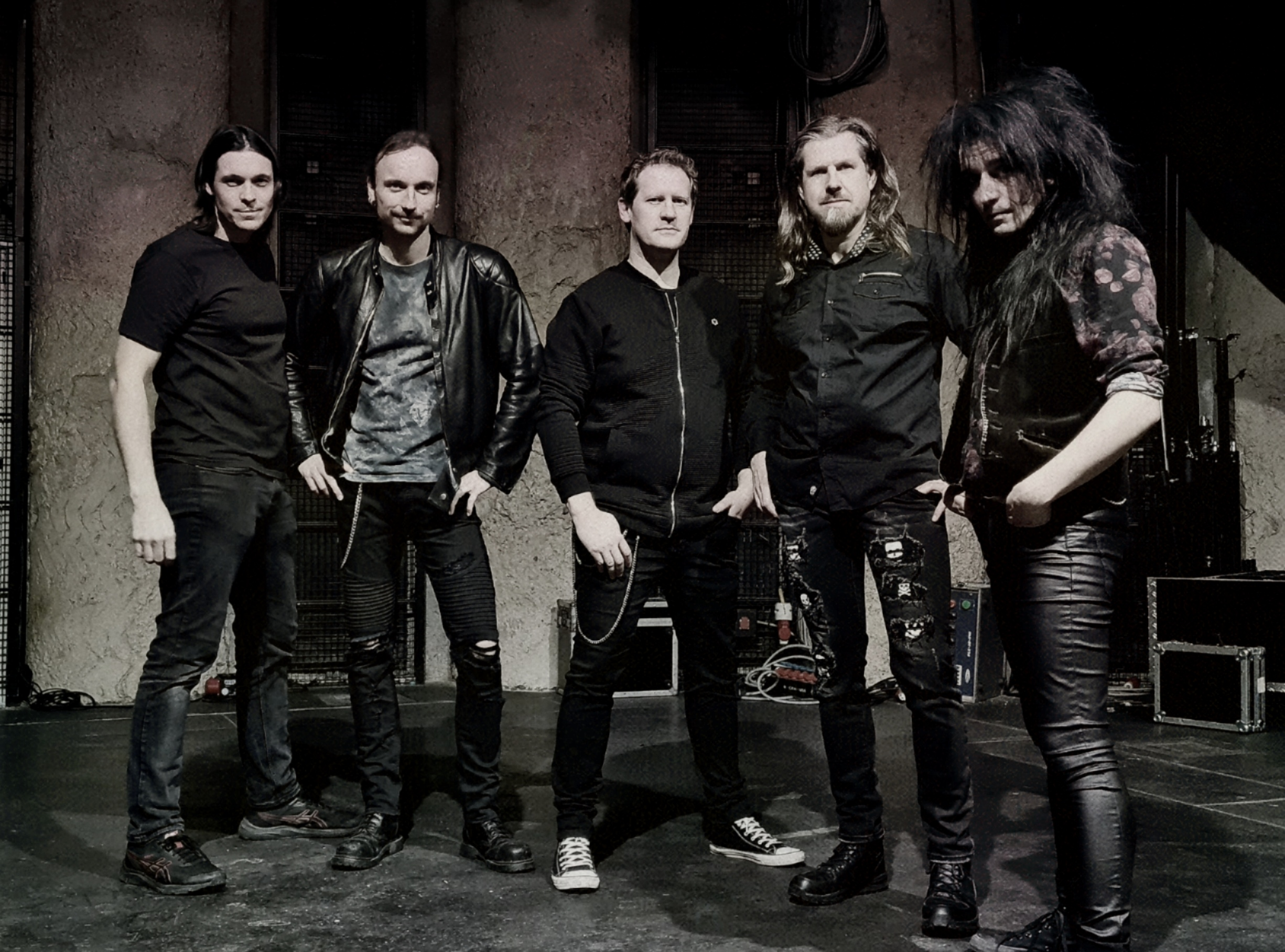
Crystallion line up in 2024

Crystallion is a German heavy/power metal band founded in 2003 by bassist Steve Hall and drummer Martin Herzinger. The first album A Dark Enchanted Crystal Night came out in 2006 and was well received by fans and media.

== History ==
Crystallion was founded in 2003 by bassist Steve Hall and drummer Martin Herzinger to combine their musical passion with their interest in history.

The band was influenced by bands like Rhapsody of Fire, Stratovarius, Helloween, and Sonata Arctica. Powerful riffs and hook-lines team up with finely crafted songwriting and melodies, but their most significant mark is singer Thomas Strübler's multi-octave voice which sets the band apart from their peers.

The first album A Dark Enchanted Crystal Night came out in 2006 and was well received by fans and media. Germany's Rock Hard gave 8/10 points and quoted: "From songs to production to the cover everything fits here. A very well done debut for a young and promising band!".

In May 2008, their second album Hattin — recorded at Helion Media Studios in Munich — was released on Dockyard 1 and the reception by fans and media was enthusiastic again. After a small release tour for the album in June 2008 and a number of gigs throughout Germany (and neighbouring Austria), guitarist Flo decided to leave the band by the end of what was to become the most successful year of the band's career until then. Since then, the band has played with one guitar only, leaving more room for the creativity of keyboardist Manuel Schallinger and guitarist Patrick Juhasz.

On their third album, Hundred Days, Crystallion refined their style by adding a bit more hard rock-oriented songwriting to their double bass dominated melodic speed metal, complementing the band's original trademarks with a slightly rougher edge. Concept-wise, the album's focus lies on the hundred days of Napoleon Bonaparte's return from his first exile on the island of Elba. Back in power, he once more tries to conquer large parts of Europe until he is finally beaten in the Battle of Waterloo and sent into exile to the remote island of St. Helena in the Atlantic Ocean. "Hundred Days" was released in November 2009.

On 19 March 2012, the band announced on their official page that Manuel Schallinger has left "for professional reasons" and they will continue without keyboards for now.

In late 2016, the band announced the new album title on their Facebook page:

At the moment, we're still in the writing and arranging process of about 10 new songs.

We are working (again) on a concept album that covers some persons and events of the Bavarian history. The album title is "Bavarian Cutome Made".

We cannot wait entering the studio and recording the best heavy stuff we've written for years...!

On 1 May 2019, Crystallion announced on Facebook that Thomas Stübler will leave the band after 15 years for personal reasons. The last concert he sang was at the Rock am Ringerl Festival in Teisendorf on 3 May 2019. As new singer, Kristina Berchtold, was announced.

Crystallion released their first album in eight years, Heads or Tails on February 19, 2021 via Pride & Joy Music.Pride & Joy Music – Just another WordPress site

The album Heads Or Tails was produced by Crystallion, engineered and mixed by Mario Lochert at SeriousBlackStudios and mastered by Jan Vacik at DreamsoundStudios. The artwork comes from Martin Herzinger at Venusworksmedia.

In early 2022 Crystallion parting ways with Kristina Berchtold and ancounced Tony Sunclear as the new vocalist. The Band tourded around Europe (Poland, Czech Republic, Austria, Switzerland, Germany) in 2023.

Steve Hall and Sven Sevens also play in the Austrian Symphonic Metal Band Edenbridge_(band).

== Members ==
=== Current ===
- Tony Sunclear – vocals
- Sven Sevens – guitar
- Patrick Juhász – guitar
- Steve Hall – bass
- Martin Herzinger – drums

=== Former ===
- Thomas Strübler – vocals
- Kristina Berchtold – vocals
- Manuel Schallinger – keyboards
- Manfred G. Stief – guitar
- Florian Ramsauer – guitar
- Wolfgang Kometer – guitar

== Discography ==
- Knights of the Apocalypse:...Nemesis (2005) Demo
- A Dark Enchanted Crystal Night (2006)
- Hattin (2008)
- Hundred Days (2009)
- Killer (2013)
- Heads or Tails (2021)
