= Near Death Experience (Spektr album) =

Studio album by Spektr
- Released: 2006
- Genre: Black metal, black ambient
- Length: 47:16
- Label: Candlelight Records

Spektr chronology
Et Fugit Intera Fugit Irreparabile Tempus (2004)	Near Death Experience (2006)	Cypher (2013)

Professional ratings
Review scores
Source	Rating
Allmusic	4/5 stars

Near Death Experience is the second album by the experimental black metal band Spektr.

== Track listing ==
1. The Violent Stink Of Twitching Terror - 08:15
2. Astral Descent - 04:10
3. Climax - 03:46
4. Phantom Reality - 09:35
5. Visualization - 02:51
6. Whatever The Case May Be - 06:02
7. Disturbing Signal - 01:55
8. Unio Mystica - 03:06
9. His Mind Ravaged, His Memory Shattered - 07:36

== Musicians ==
- kl.K. (a.k.a. Krig) - drums, vocals, samples, programming
- Hth - guitars, bass, vocals, samples, programming
