= Lightning Swords of Death =

US musical group

- Origin: Los Angeles, California, United States
- Genres: Black metal, thrash metal
- Years active: 2003–present
- Labels: Metal Blade
- Members: Autarch (Farron Loathing); Roskva (Jeremy Stramaglio); Menno; Chris Velez; Jackson Ferris
- Past members: Jason Brown; Jonathan Cathey; Mike Vega

Lightning Swords of Death is an American black metal band formed in 2003 by vocalist Autarch and guitarist Roskva in Los Angeles, California.

Lightning Swords of Death signed a record deal with Metal Blade Records in 2009 and continued to push their music through their DIY attitude, getting multiple tracks on the PSP game Undead Knights as well as a track featured on the soundtrack for the 2009 film The Stepfather.

== Discography ==
=== Studio albums ===
- The Golden Plague (2007)
- The Extra Dimensional Wound (2010) Metal Blade Records
- Baphometic Chaosium (2013)

=== Demos ===
- Plunder & Lightning (2005)

=== Splits ===
- Lightning Swords of Death/Valdur (2008)

== Band members ==
=== Current members ===
- Autarch (Farron Loathing) - Vocals
- Roskva (Jeremy Stramaglio) - Guitar
- Menno - Bass
- Inverted Chris (Chris Velez) - Guitar
- Jackson Ferris - Drums

=== Former members ===
- Mike Vega - Drums
- Jason Brown - Bass
- Jonathan Cathey - Drums
- Thrudvang - Drums
