= Unshine =

Finnish metal band

- Origin: Finland
- Genres: Gothic metal, symphonic metal
- Years active: since 2000
- Labels: Crash Music, Massacre
- Members: Susanna Vesilahti; Harri Hautala; Jari Hautala; Jukka "Stibe" Hantula; Teemu "Teemal" Vähäkangas
- Website: www.unshine.com

Unshine is a gothic metal, symphonic metal band from Helsinki, Finland.

== Career ==
Unshine was formed in May 2000, when Susanna Vesilahti visited the rehearsal of the band for the first time. The other members, who had known each other for some years from other projects, describe that as a "kind of a musical awakening". At that time the band had their rehearsal room at the cellar of the "Manala" restaurant in Helsinki.

The next years were filled with rehearsals and composing. At the beginning of 2002, Unshine self-produced their first demo which was called "Promo 2002", on which they published three songs. In the following summer, they had their first public gigs, which were followed by their second demo, "Promo 2003".

Their debut-album Earth Magick was recorded in 2004 by Low Frequency Records. One year later it was released in Finland and North-America by Crash Music. Unshine's second album, The Enigma of Immortals, was released in April 2008. In 2013, the third studio album Dark Half Rising was released via Massacre Records followed by the album Astrala in 2018.

=== Style ===
In reviews, their music has been described as gothic metal and atmospheric symphonic metal, although they categorize themselves as druid metal. Unshine's early style has been interpreted as being torn between bands like Nightwish and Lacuna Coil and a much more pop-oriented direction.

== Members ==
- Susanna Vesilahti - vocals
- Harri Hautala - guitar, synthesizer
- Jari Hautala - guitar
- Jukka "Stibe" Hantula - drums
- Teemu "Teemal" Vähäkangas - bass

== Discography ==
=== Albums ===
- Earth Magick (2005)
- The Enigma of Immortals (2008)
- Dark Half Rising (2013)
- Astrala (2018)
- Karn of Burnings (2024)

=== Demos ===
- Promo 2002 (2002)
- Promo 2003 (2003)
