= S7N =

Mexican thrash metal band

- Origin: Mexico City, Mexico
- Genres: Heavy metal, thrash metal
- Years active: 2009–present
- Members: Mao Kanto; Israel Monroy; Lalo Olvera; Stu Zepeda
- Past members: Fabián Carreño; Adrián Mayorga; Guillermo García
- Website: s7nmusic.com

S7N (pronounced "seven") is a Mexican heavy metal band formed in Mexico City, in 2013 by guitarist and vocalist Mao Kanto and guitarist Guillermo García.

== History ==
=== Formation, demos and Fearless (2009–2013) ===
S7N was formed in 2009 in Mexico City by guitarists Mao Kanto and Guillermo García. The name derives from the date July 7, 2007 (07–07–07). A few months later, guitarist Israel Monroy, bassist Lalo Olvera, and drummer Zared joined the band. Early on, S7N performed covers while writing original songs. Zared departed the band in 2012, leading to Fabián Carreño joining on drums. They began recording their debut album, Fearless, released on November 25, 2013, with official videos released for "Blackout" and "Double Dealing".

=== Deadline and national success (2014–present) ===
The release of Fearless brought the attention of Mexican media, leading to S7N's participation as opening act for several artists during 2014, such as Havok, Ghost, and Napalm Death. The album received a nomination for Best Metal Album at the Mexico Independent Music Awards.

In 2015, "Blackout" was used as part of Netflix's Club de Cuervos soundtrack, on Season 1's Episode 7, as well as on EMP UNDERGROUND Volume One, a compilation for EMP Label Group. On March 14, the band played for the first time Vive Latino, the most important Latin rock festival in Mexico, on the Carpa Intolerante stage. On May 9, they played Force Fest in Guadalajara on the Main Stage, sharing the lineup with Overkill and Judas Priest. On September 12, S7N shared the stage with former Mötley Crüe singer John Corabi and Mexican bands such as Maligno and Agora at Hair Fest.

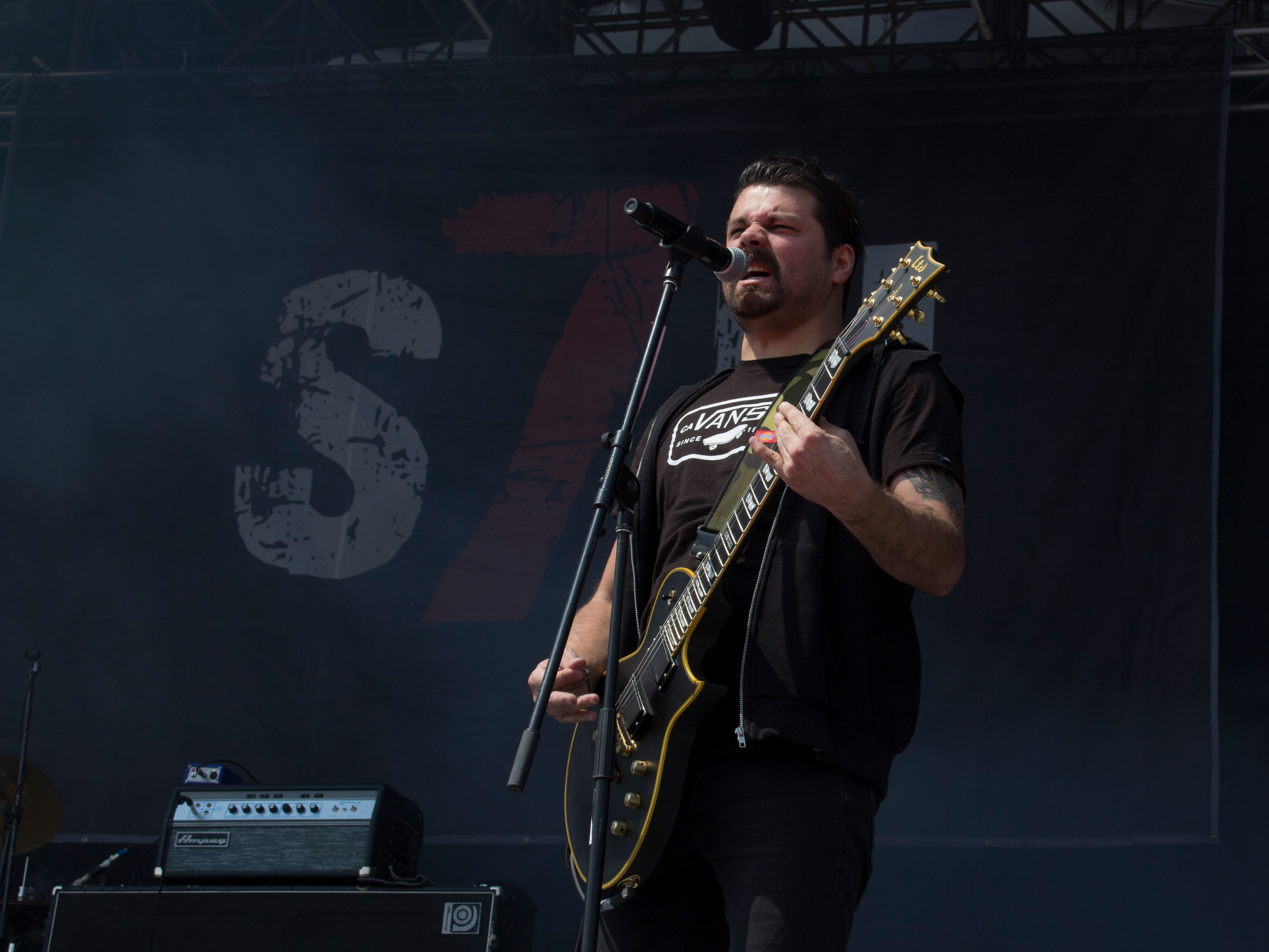
Israel Monroy playing Knotfest Mexico 2017

During 2016, the band received further recognition, and they played their first concert outside Mexico at Rock Fiesta in Quartzsite, Arizona alongside some of the most iconic Mexican rock bands, such as El Tri, Caifanes, Café Tacuba, Maldita Vecindad, and Molotov. This show marked their first appearance after Carreño's departure earlier that year, with Agora's Eduardo Carrillo filling in for a couple of shows. Carrillo was also part of the recording of the band's sophomore album Deadline as co-producer along with fellow Agora's Manuel Vázquez at their own SoundMob Studio, with Los Viejos's Leo Padua performing drums. Deadline was released on June 17, after a successful crowdfunding campaign. Later that year, the band recruited drummer Adrián Mayorga and played main stage on October 15 at Slipknot's Knotfest, on the festival's second edition at Mexico. To end the year, they closed the Agaves Stage at Coordenada festival in Guadalajara.

On April 29, 2016, S7N released "Innocent Guilty" as the first single from Deadline through a lyric video. On May 5, 2017, "Bomb Maker" was released as the second single, with a music video directed by Lack of Remorse's singer Andrei Pulver. S7N repeated their appearance at Knotfest Mexico 2017 after Asesino cancelled their participation.

== Members ==
=== Current members ===
- Mao Kanto - lead vocals, rhythm guitar (2009–present)
- Israel Monroy - lead guitar, backing vocals (2009–present)
- Lalo Olvera - bass (2009–present)
- Stu Zepeda - drums (2018–present)

=== Former members ===
- Zared – drums (2009–2012)
- Fabián Carreño - drums (2012–2016)
- Adrián Mayorga - drums (2016–2018)
- Guillermo García - guitar (2009–2022)

=== Touring members ===
- Eduardo Carrillo – drums (2016)

== Discography ==
=== Studio albums ===
Year	Album details
2013	Fearless: Released: November 25, 2013; Label: Independent
2016	Deadline: Released: June 17, 2016; Label: Independent

=== Singles ===
Year	Song	Album
2013	"Blackout" "Double Dealing"	Fearless
2014	"Blackoustic"	Non-album single
2016	"Innocent Guilty"	Deadline
2017	"Bomb Maker"	Deadline
2019	"Insane"	Non-album single
2021	Resistance	Live Session
2022	Pachuco	Cover
2023	Circus	Non-album single
2023	Betray	Non-album single
2024	Afuera	Cover
2024	Faithful to my Demons	Non-album single
2024	They don't care about us	Cover

=== Music videos ===
Year	Song	Director
2014	"Blackout"	Cheeno Mesdrage
2015	"Double Dealing"	Cheeno Mesdrage
2017	"Bomb Maker"	Andrei Pulver
2019	"Insane"	Luisa Melo
2022	"Pachuco"	Cheeno Mesdrage
2023	Circus	Ricardo C. Bueno
2025	Rage	L.Melo, G. Figueroa, R. Bueno
