= Heavy Metal Music (album) =

Studio album by Newsted
- Released: August 6, 2013
- Recorded: March−April 2013
- Genre: Heavy metal
- Length: 57:03
- Label: Chophouse
- Producer: Jason Newsted

Newsted chronology
Metal (2013)	Heavy Metal Music (2013)

Professional ratings
Aggregate scores
Source	Rating
Metacritic	72/100
Review scores
Source	Rating
About.com	4/5 stars
AllMusic	2.5/5 stars
Consequence of Sound	3.5/5 stars
Exclaim!	8/10
The Guardian	4/5 stars
Loudwire	4/5 stars
Rock Sound	5/10
The Skinny	4/5 stars

Heavy Metal Music is the debut studio album by American heavy metal band Newsted. It was released on August 6, 2013, and is the only Newsted release to feature guitarist Mike Mushok who joined the band following their debut release EP, Metal (2013). It was the band's only full-length release prior to bassist/vocalist Jason Newsted shutting down the project in early 2014, though the band later reunited in 2023.

== Background ==
The band finished pre-production of the album in March 2013, and finished recording sessions in April. The album title, track listing and artwork were unveiled on June 4, 2013, along with the album's first track, "Heroic Dose". The album features two songs, "Soldierhead" and "King of the Underdogs", from their debut EP, Metal. On July 18, 2013, Newsted premiered a second track, "Ampossible". On July 25, 2013, Newsted released an official lyric video for the song "Above All".

== Track listing ==
All songs written by Jason Newsted

No.	Title	Length
1.	"Heroic Dose"	5:24
2.	"Soldierhead"	4:16
3.	"...As the Crow Flies"	5:58
4.	"Ampossible"	4:00
5.	"Long Time Dead"	4:32
6.	"Above All"	4:35
7.	"King of the Underdogs"	5:57
8.	"Nocturnus"	6:13
9.	"Twisted Tail of the Comet"	5:14
10.	"Kindevillusion"	5:20
11.	"Futureality"	5:25
Total length:		57:03

Deluxe edition bonus tracks
No.	Title	Length
12.	"Spiderbiter"	4:31
13.	"Godsnake"	5:16
14.	"Skyscraper"	6:35

Itunes deluxe edition and Japanese edition bonus track
No.	Title	Length
15.	"The Differents"	5:39

- Both deluxe editions come with a 38-minute documentary on the making of the album.

== Personnel ==
Newsted

- Jason Newsted − bass, lead vocals
- Mike Mushok − lead guitar
- Jessie Farnsworth − rhythm guitar, backing vocals
- Jesus Mendez Jr. − drums, percussion
