= Common Dead =

American metal band

- Origin: Chicago, Illinois, U.S.
- Genres: Thrash metal, melodic death metal, groove metal
- Years active: 2009–2013
- Labels: Independent
- Members: A.P. Laurenson

Common Dead was an American thrash/groove metal band and stage name of recording artist A.P. Laurenson. The band was considered part of the new wave of American heavy metal.

== History ==
Common Dead is classified as melodic death metal by various sources, although the band touches on melodic thrash metal, groove metal, and alternative metal influences. Laurenson was the band's sole proprietor and performed all instrumentation for all recorded efforts. He played lead/rhythm guitar and vocals for live occasions.

Common Dead debuted with a self-titled album in 2009. In an interview with Metal-Rules.com, Laurenson commented that the band revolves around a melodic guitar influence and raw, forthright vocals. A four-track EP was released in January 2011 entitled Interim Flesh, which experimented with industrial metal influences not typical of the band's style. The EP scored warm praise from critics.

The band released an album Diatribe in February 2012. It was met with generally positive reviews from numerous sources. Three music videos were released for the album. One titled "Critical Mass" was broadcast on Underground Video TV. The following year, the album Allegorize was released.

Metal Underground posted an interview after a raw mix for a Fear Factory cover came out on YouTube. Common Dead recorded a cover for "Flashpoint" as one instrumentalist. They also announced that new members would be joining the band for live performances. A break in activity was confirmed in 2013 as Laurenson moved towards other projects, including work under his natural name.

== Discography ==
- Common Dead (2009)
- Interim Flesh (EP, 2011)
- "Come Get Some: Alternate Studio Version" (Single, 2011)
- Diatribe (2012)
- Allegorize (2013)
