= Silver Mountain =

Silver Mountain may refer to:

== Peaks ==
- Silver Mountain (Tarnowskie Góry Ridge), known locally as "Srebrna Góra"
- Silver Mountain (San Bernardino County, California)
- Silver Mountain (Huerfano County, Colorado)
- Silver Mountain (San Miguel County, Colorado), near Telluride
- Silver Mountain (Idaho)
- Sierra de la Plata, a mythical source of silver in South America

== Settlements ==
- Silver Mountain, Ontario, Canada
- Silver Mountain, California, United States

== Other ==
- Silver Mountain (band), a Swedish heavy metal band
