= Timo Kotipelto =

Finnish singer

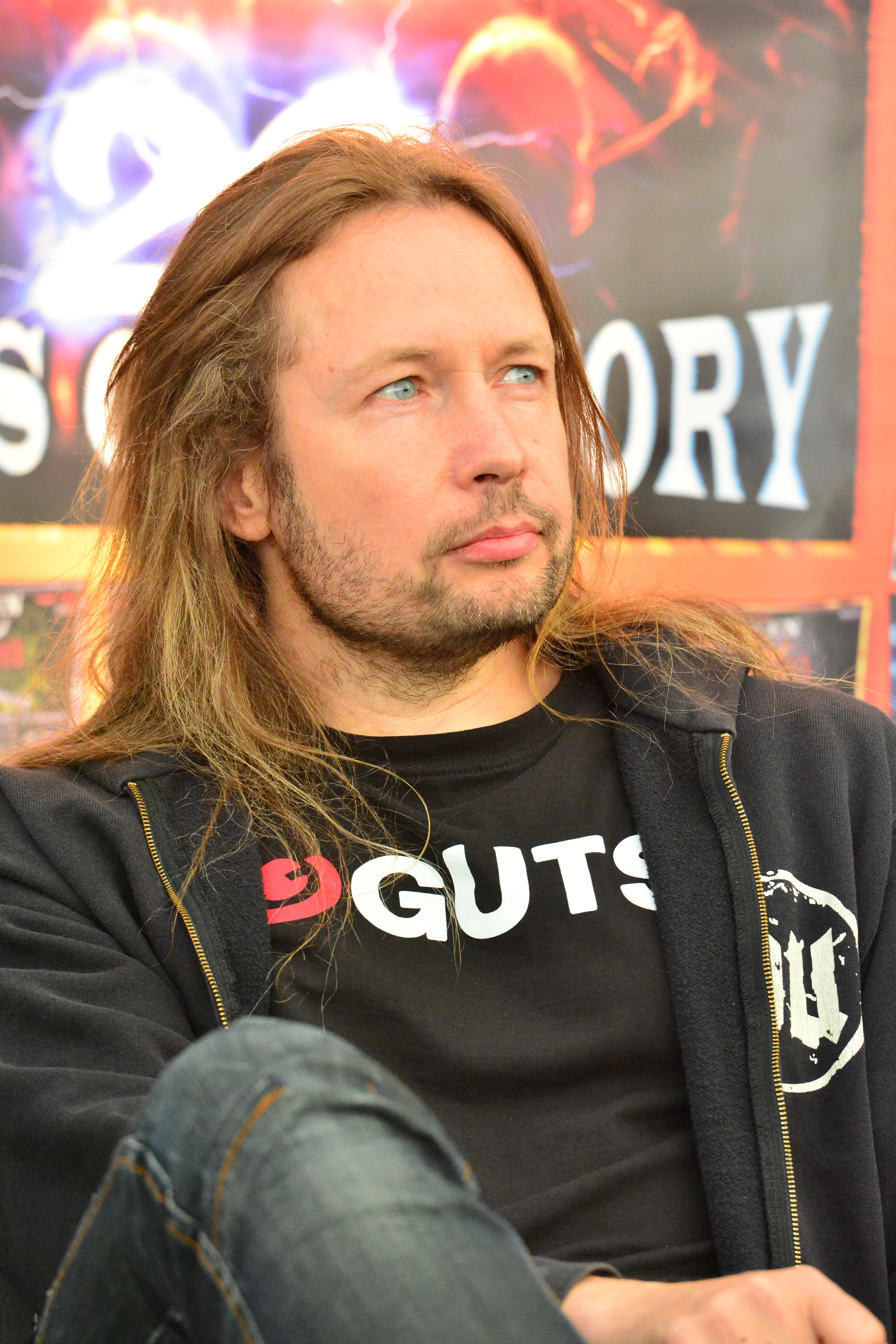
- Kotipelto at Wacken Open Air 2015

Background information
- Born: Timo Antero Kotipelto; 15 March 1969 (age 57); Lappajärvi, Finland
- Genres: Power metal; symphonic metal; neoclassical metal
- Occupations: Singer, songwriter
- Years active: 1982–present
- Member of: Stratovarius; Kotipelto; Cain's Offering

Timo Antero Kotipelto (born 15 March 1969) is a Finnish musician best known as the lead singer of the power metal band Stratovarius, whom he joined in 1994, as well as fronting his own band Kotipelto.

== Biography ==
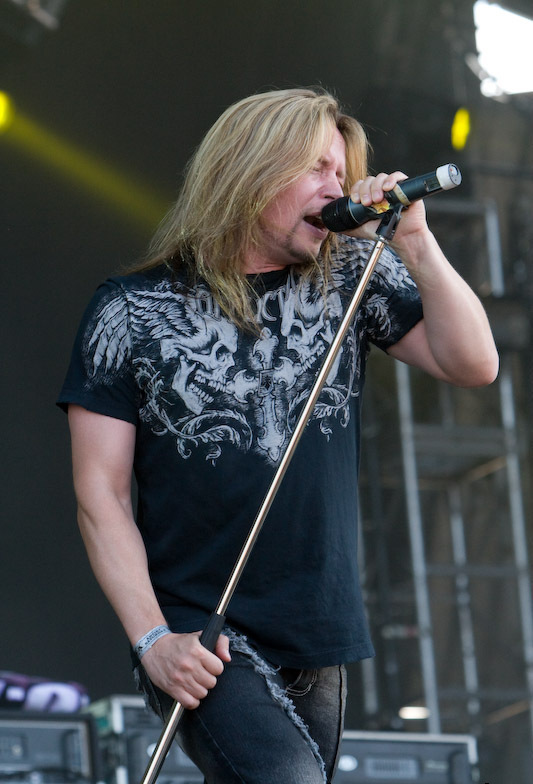
Kotipelto performing in 2007

Kotipelto studied vocals at the pop/jazz conservatory in Helsinki, briefly singing for an amateur cover band named Filthy Asses who self-released an Ep containing three songs. In the summer of 1994, he applied to Stratovarius, who were looking for a singer at the time, and was accepted. His arrival corresponds closely with the band's rise to international fame. The first album he recorded with the band was Fourth Dimension in 1995. Stratovarius later became a top name in the European heavy metal scene, recording 12 more albums and performing in numerous notable rock festivals.

While Stratovarius was performing at Europe's largest metal music festival, Wacken Open Air, in Germany on 4 August 2000, he burned his left hand in a pyrotechnic explosion, resulting in second and third degree burns to two fingers and the back of his hand. Kotipelto was able to sing until the end of the concert, but the band's Latin American tour was cancelled, giving him time to recover.

In late 2003, Kotipelto split from Stratovarius after intra-band disagreements, notably with guitarist Timo Tolkki. After much turmoil throughout 2004, he rejoined the band in January 2005, recorded the album Stratovarius, and performed live on tour that covered North America, South America, Europe and Asia. In 2008, Timo Tolkki made public that he and Kotipelto had arguments but Kotipelto never really left the band and the announcement that he left was part of a big publicity stunt. In 2025 Kotipelto revealed that he and Tolkki are on good terms with each other.

In 2002, Kotipelto started a solo project called Kotipelto. So far, he has released three albums: "Waiting for the Dawn", "Coldness" and the last one, released in April 2007, "Serenity". The single "Beginning" reached the top 10 in his native Finland. He described his solo work as "more straightforward. And more 1980s heavy metal orientated."

Kotipelto joined forces with his close friend Jani Liimatainen to form the band Cain's Offering in 2009, recording the critically acclaimed albums Gather the Faithful (2009) and Stormcrow (2015), along with playing many shows in Japan and Europe. They also made the Blackoustic acoustic duo album together in 2012.

Aside from Stratovarius and Kotipelto, Kotipelto has also provided additional vocals to Sonata Arctica's Silence album, along with lead vocals for the song "Out of the White Hole" on Ayreon's 2000 release Universal Migrator Part 2: Flight of the Migrator. Kotipelto also provided vocals for the track "Eye of the Storm" on Warmen's 2009 album Japanese Hospitality.

Kotipelto began hosting MTV Finland's Headbangers Ball on 25 February 2007. He succeeded Jonna Nygren in the position. Kotipelo became the inaugural winner of Kuorosota, the Finnish version of Clash of the Choirs, in 2009.

Before joining Stratovarius Kotipelto took study singing classes however he never graduated due to Stratovarius‘s touring schedule. During a 2011 tour he suffered a Campylobacter infection. The group then had to cancel 3 shows and he had to force his voice on the stage during subsequent shows. It took nearly two years for his vocals to fully recover. During his recovery he took multiple singing lessons.

Kotipelto has stated in interviews about being emotionally invested in his work, and that he finds live performance's draining but in a positive way. In his spare time he has also provided vocal coaching for a select number of students.

== Discography ==
=== With Stratovarius ===
- Fourth Dimension (1995)
- Episode (1996)
- Visions (1997)
- The Past and Now (Compilation, 1997)
- Visions of Europe (Live, 1998)
- Destiny (1998)
- "Visions Of Destiny" (DVD, 1999)
- The Chosen Ones (Compilation, 1999)
- Infinite (2000)
- "14 Diamonds - Best Of Stratovarius" (Compilation, 2000)
- Infinite Visions (DVD, 2000)
- Intermission (2001)
- Elements, Pt. 1 (2003)
- Elements, Pt. 2 (2003)
- Stratovarius (2005)
- "Black Diamond: The Anthology" (Compilation, 2006)
- Polaris (2009)
- "Polaris live" (2010)
- Elysium (2011)
- "Under Flaming Winter Skies (Live in Tampere - The Jörg Michael Farewell Tour)" (DVD, 2012)
- "Under Flaming Winter Skies – Live in Tampere" (Live, 2012)
- Nemesis (2013)
- "Nemesis Days" (DVD, 2014)
- Eternal (2015)
- Best Of (2016)
- Enigma: Intermission 2 (2018)
- Survive (2022)

=== Kotipelto ===
- Waiting for the Dawn (2002)
- Coldness (2004)
- Serenity (2007)

=== With Cain's Offering ===
- Gather the Faithful (2009)
- Stormcrow (2015)

=== Kotipelto & Liimatainen ===
- Blackoustic (2012)

== Guest appearances ==
=== With Gamma Ray ===
- Time to Break Free Song live (1996)

=== With Tarot ===
- For the Glory of Nothing (1998) – Backing vocals on 'Warhead' and 'Beyond Troy'

=== With Tunnelvision ===
- While the World Awaits (2000) – Backing vocals

=== Timo Kotipelto and Klaus Flaming ===
- I Wanna Love You Tender (cover of Danny & Army) (2002)

=== With Warmen ===
- Beyond Abilities (2002) – Vocals on 'Spark' and 'Singer's Chance'
- Accept the Fact (2005) – Vocals on 'Invisible Power' and 'Puppet'
- Japanese Hospitality (2009) – Vocals on 'Eye of the Storm'

=== With Sonata Arctica ===
- Silence (2001) – Backing vocals and last line on 'False News Travel Fast'
- Stones Grow Her Name (2012) – Backing vocals

=== With Klamydia ===
- Seokset (2003) – Vocals on 'Metanol Man'

=== With Ayreon ===
- Universal Migrator Part 2: Flight of the Migrator (2000) – Vocals on 'Out of the White Hole (M31 – Planet Y – The Search Continues)'

=== Monstervision Freakshow ===
- Welcome to Hellsinki (2007)

=== With Ella Ja Aleksi ===
- Takapihan Tavikset (2009) - Vocals on "Ronnie James Biojäteastia"

=== With Leningrad Cowboys ===
- I Will Stay (2006)
- Let's Have a Party (2006)

=== With Amberian Dawn ===
- Circus Black (2012) – Vocals on 'Cold Kiss'

=== With Hevisaurus ===
- Räyhällistä joulua (2011) – Vocals on 'Pieni liekki'
- Bändikouluun (2019) – Vocals on '100'

=== With Soulspell ===
- The Second Big Bang (2017)
- The End You'll Only Know at the End (2017)
- Alexandria (Apocalypse version) (2017)

=== With La suma de las partes ===
- Vergel (2020) - Vocals on "Rain in the Ocean"

=== With Tarja ===
- Feliz Navidad (2017) - Vocals on "Feliz Navidad"
- From Spirits and Ghosts (Score for a Dark Christmas) (2020) - Vocals on "Feliz Navidad (Barbuda Relief and Recovery Charity Version)"

=== With Jani Liimatainen ===
- My Father's Son (2022) - Vocals on "Who Are We" & "Into the Fray"
