= Janne Wirman =

Finnish keyboardist (born 1979)

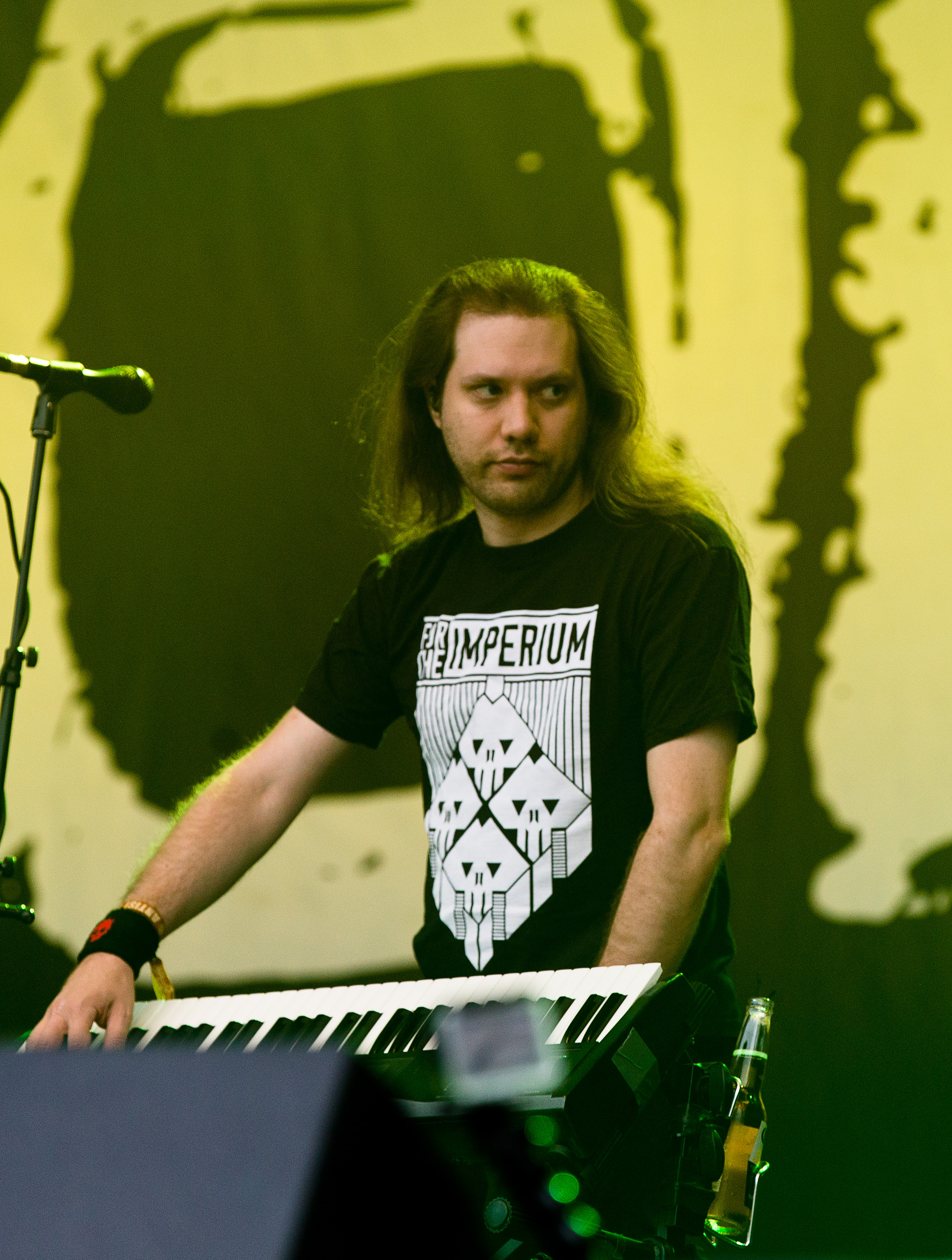
- Wirman with Children of Bodom in 2016

Background information
- Also known as: "Warman"
- Born: Janne Viljami Virtanen; 26 April 1979 (age 47); Espoo, Finland
- Genres: Melodic death metal; power metal; neoclassical metal
- Occupation: Musician
- Instruments: Keyboards; synthesizer; piano
- Years active: 1997–present
- Member of: Warmen
- Formerly of: Children of Bodom; Kotipelto

Janne Viljami "Warman" Wirman (born 26 April 1979) is a Finnish heavy metal musician. He is the founder and keyboardist of Warmen and has been a member of Children of Bodom since 1997.

== Biography ==
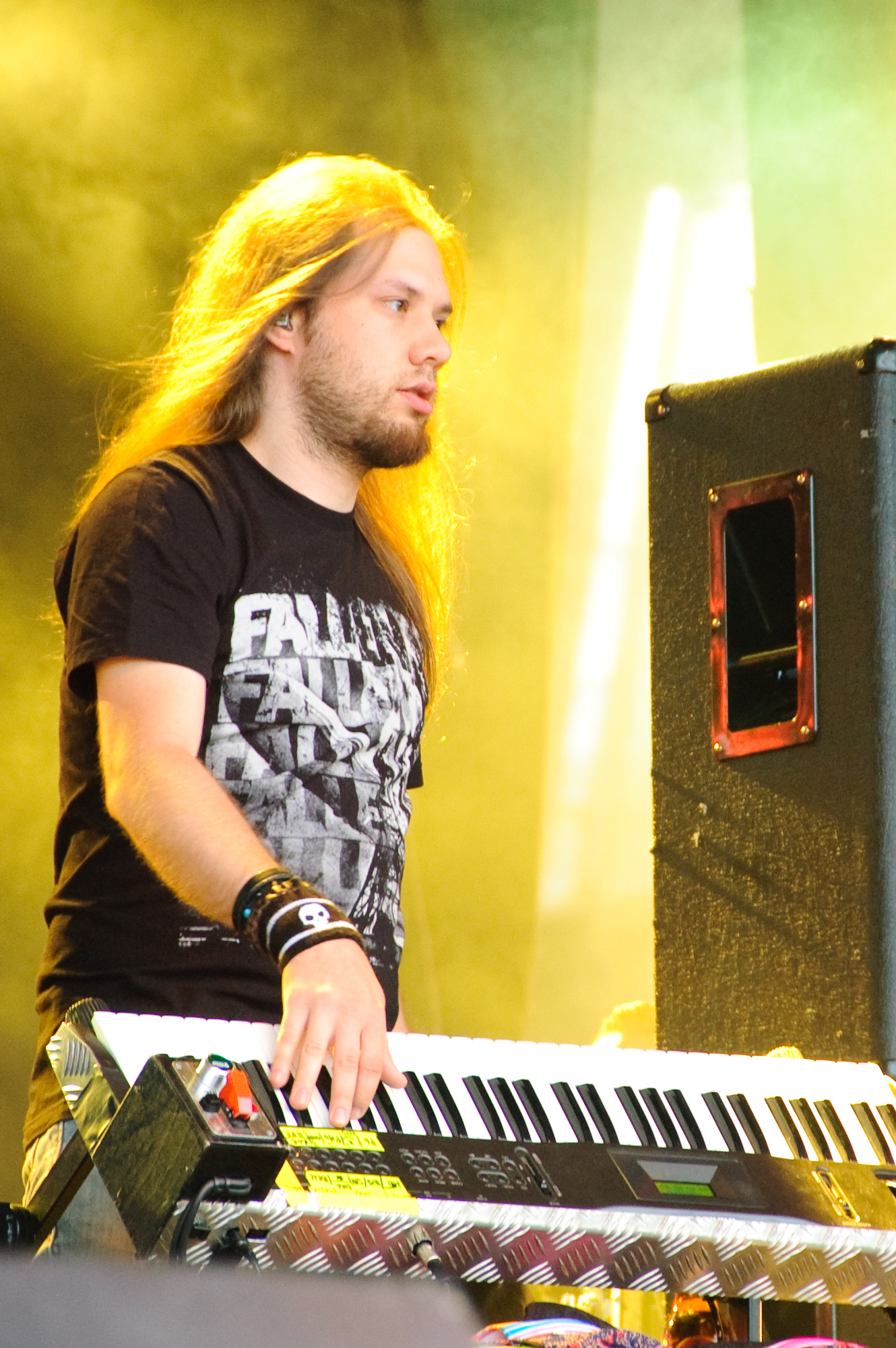
Wirman in 2009

Born in the city of Espoo, Finland, Wirman began playing the piano at the age of five. For most of his early life, he focused his style on jazz, switching his main interest to heavy metal music once he joined the metal band Children of Bodom in 1997. Wirman remained in the band until their first breakup in 2019 and rejoined for their 2026–2027 reunion shows.

He graduated from the Helsinki Pop & Jazz Conservatory at the age of sixteen and was subsequently invited by Jaska Raatikainen to join Children of Bodom, due to their previous keyboardist, Jani Pirisjoki, being fired from the band. Wirman was the deciding factor for them to truly begin their professional career. Not only did he bring his talent to the band, but after a single practice, he also became able to play in sync with lead vocalist and lead guitarist Alexi Laiho. This synchronization can be observed during their live performances, or on the recorded tracks Bed of Razors, Lake Bodom and Downfall.

In the year of 2000, Wirman assembled progressive metal band Warmen as his main side-project. The band's second album, Beyond Abilities, continued with the presence of his brother Antti Wirman.

In the same year, Johansson was asked by heavy metal band Masterplan to play on their debut album, but since he was already busy with other projects, he referred to Janne instead. Thus, in early 2002, Wirman took part in the recording of Masterplan's self-titled debut album. The band proceeded to offer him a permanent position, but Warman opted to continue playing with Children of Bodom. Masterplan released their album and gave credit to Wirman's work on the CD's booklet. The band's keyboard player Axel Mackenrott, hired after Wirman's decline to enter the band, appeared on all of the promotional pictures, and was officially credited as Masterplan's keyboardist.

To record with Warmen, Wirman built the Warmen Productions Studio (now named Beyond Abilities). This studio has also served for the recording of Kotipelto's keyboard tracks, part of Ensiferum's Iron album and Sinergy's fourth album.

Wirman has had bad experiences with sponsor deals. He had dealt with both Roland Scandinavia and Korg in the past and was promised new equipment, but he never received anything. On the back of Warmen's second album it reads: "No Roland or Korg products were used."

Wirman was originally just supposed to play a few shows with Children of Bodom, but they grew to like him. On the Chaos Ridden Years documentary, Laiho said, "But it was the first time I saw the guy drunk, and that's when I knew he was the fucking man." Wirman stayed with them, but said he felt like a real member of the band around the time of the recording of his second album with them.

== Musical style and influences ==
His primary influence is keyboardist Jens Johansson from Stratovarius (also played with guitar virtuoso Yngwie Malmsteen and Dio) from whom he has adopted the style of playing his keyboard tilted forward.

== Equipment ==
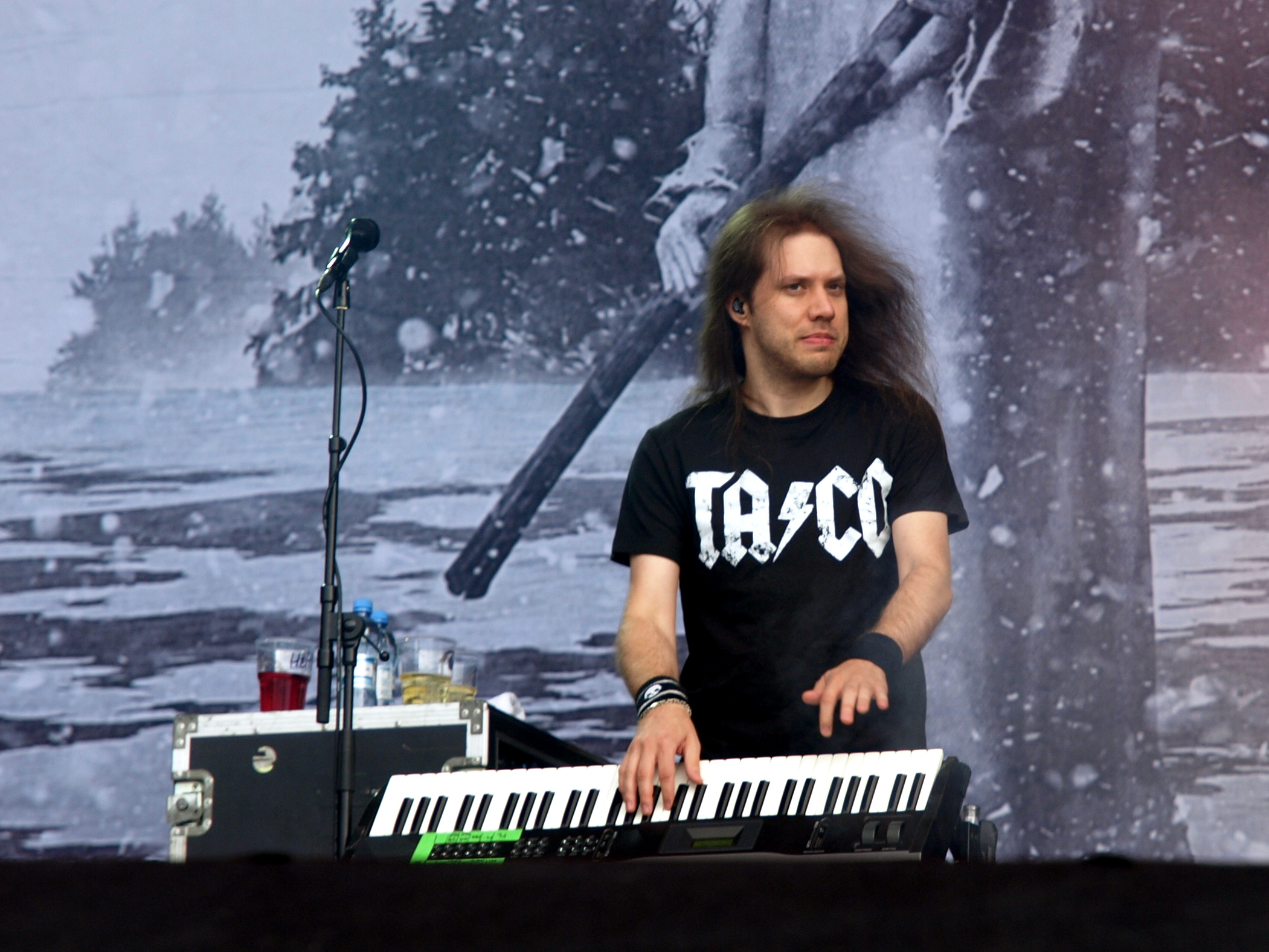
Wirman performing with Children of Bodom in 2013

Throughout most of his career, Wirman relied on the Korg X5D keyboard to play live, although he only uses it as a master MIDI controller – the synth rack/module setup he is controlling onstage has varied. Wirman's lead sound was crafted by Jens Johansson. It is a Korg Polysix emulation patch Jens made for the Roland JV-1080.

== Discography ==
=== With Children of Bodom ===
Albums

- Something Wild (1997)
- Hatebreeder (1999)
- Tokyo Warhearts (live CD, 1999)
- Follow the Reaper (2000)
- Hate Crew Deathroll (2003)
- Are You Dead Yet? (2005)
- Stockholm Knockout Live (2006)
- Blooddrunk (2008)
- Skeletons in the Closet (2009)
- Relentless Reckless Forever (2011)
- Halo of Blood (2013)
- I Worship Chaos (2015)
- Hexed (2019)

Singles & EPs

- Children of Bodom (single, 1997)
- Downfall (single, 1998)
- Hate Me! (single, 2000)
- You're Better Off Dead! (single, 2002)
- Trashed, Lost & Strungout (EP, 2004)
- In Your Face (single, 2005)
- Blooddrunk (single, 2008)

=== With Warmen ===
Albums

- Unknown Soldier (2000)
- Beyond Abilities (2001)
- Accept the Fact (2005)
- Japanese Hospitality (2009)
- First of the Five Elements (2014)
- Here for None (2023)
- Band of Brothers (2025)

Singles

- Somebody's Watching Me (single, 2005)
- They All Blame Me (single, 2005)
- Alone (single, 2001)

=== With Kotipelto ===
Albums

- Waiting for the Dawn (2002)
- Coldness (2004)
- Serenity (2007)

Singles

- "Beginning" (single, 2002)
- "Reasons" (single, 2004)
- "Take Me Away" (single, 2004)
- "Sleep Well" (single, 2006)

=== With Masterplan ===
Albums

- Masterplan (2003)
