= Serenity (Kotipelto album) =

Studio album by Kotipelto
- Released: 11 April 2007
- Recorded: 2006
- Genre: Power metal
- Length: 45:23
- Label: AFM Records

Kotipelto chronology
Coldness (2004)	Serenity (2007)

Professional ratings
Review scores
Source	Rating
AllMusic	3/5 stars

Serenity is the third album by power metal band Kotipelto, released in 2007 while Stratovarius was in hiatus.

== Track listing ==
All lyrics/music by Timo Kotipelto, except track 2 and 10 (music: Kotipelto/Tuomas Wäinölä).

1. "Once upon a Time" – 3:21
2. "Sleep Well" – 4:16
3. "Serenity" – 3:32
4. "City of Mysteries" – 4:20
5. "King Anti-Midas" – 4:06
6. "Angels Will Cry" – 3:57
7. "After The Rain" – 3:54
8. "Mr. Know-It-All" – 5:19
9. "Dreams and Reality" – 4:27
10. "Last Defender" – 8:17
11. "After the Rain" (Acoustic Version) [limited edition bonus track] – 3:45
12. "Sleep Well" (Acoustic Version) [Japanese edition bonus track] – 3:55
13. "Serenity" (Acoustic version) [Japanese edition bonus track] – 3:45

== Personnel ==
- Timo Kotipelto – vocals
- Tuomas Wäinölä – guitar
- Lauri Porra – bass
- Janne Wirman – keyboards
- Mirka Rantanen – drums

Production

- Mixed by Mikko Karmila at Finnvox Studios
- Mastered by Mika Jussila at Finnvox Studios
- Drums and guitars recorded at Sonic Pump Studios – engineered by Nino Laurenne
- Guitar solos, bass and vocals recorded at High And Loud's Elk-studios – engineered by Tero "mix-max" Kostermaa
- Backing vocals by Brothers of Balls: Pasi Rantanen, Anssi Stenberg and Marko Waara
- Cover artwork and layout by Janne "ToxicAngel" Pitkänen

== Chart performance ==
Year	Chart	Position
2007	Finnish Albums Chart	8
