= Blackoustic =

2012 studio album by Kotipelto & Liimatainen

Studio album by Kotipelto & Liimatainen
- Released: October 10, 2012
- Recorded: 2012
- Genre: Acoustic rock
- Label: Earmusic
- Producers: Jani Liimatainen and Timo Kotipelto

Blackoustic is a collaborative acoustic album by Stratovarius and Cain's Offering vocalist Timo Kotipelto and ex-Sonata Arctica and Cain's Offering guitarist Jani Liimatainen (credited as Kotipelto & Liimatainen). The album was released on October 19, 2012, and entered the Finnish charts at #13 the first week. The album is self-financed. While initially only sold during performances, the album was eventually released through the Earmusic label, which had released the prior Stratovarius albums since Polaris.

All songs from the album are covers, except for "Where My Rainbow Ends" written by Liimatainen. Regarding the song, Liimatainen commented, "I remembered a song I wrote last winter. Originally it was an instrumental track, but after listening back to it I thought that the melody would work very well with vocals. We rearranged the song into our acoustic format and as a slave of habit I wrote the lyrics for it the night before our last day of recording. It turned out surprisingly beautiful and delicate."

After the release of the album the duo began touring, performing in shows taking place through November 23, 2012.

== Track listing ==
No.	Title	Writer(s)	Length
1.	"Sleep Well" (from Kotipelto's solo album)	Timo Kotipelto/Tuomas Wäinölä	3:35
2.	"Out in the Fields" (Gary Moore cover)	Gary Moore	3:58
3.	"Black Diamond" (Stratovarius cover)	Kotipelto/Timo Tolkki	4:05
4.	"My Selene" (Sonata Arctica cover)	Jani Liimatainen	4:54
5.	"Behind Blue Eyes" (The Who cover)	Pete Townshend	3:31
6.	"Hunting High and Low" (Stratovarius cover)	Kotipelto/Tolkki	4:43
7.	"Where My Rainbow Ends" (Original song)	Liimatainen	3:30
8.	"Speed of Light" (Stratovarius cover)	Kotipelto/Tolkki	4:04
9.	"Perfect Strangers" (Deep Purple cover)	Ritchie Blackmore/Ian Gillan/Roger Glover	4:28
10.	"Coming Home" (Stratovarius cover)	Tolkki	4:02
11.	"Serenity" (from Kotipelto's solo album)	Kotipelto	5:24
12.	"Rainbow Eyes" (Rainbow cover)	Ritchie Blackmore/Ronnie James Dio	6:00
13.	"Karjalan kunnailla (On the Hills of Karjala)" (Finnish traditional)	Liimatainen (arrangements)	2:37
14.	""Beauty Has Come" (from Kotipelto's solo album) (Japanese bonus track)"		4:31

== Personnel ==
- Timo Kotipelto – lead vocals, additional acoustic guitar
- Jani Liimatainen – acoustic guitar, backing vocals
- Matias Kupiainen – mixing, mastering
