= Beyond Abilities =

Studio album by Warmen
- Released: 29 October 2001
- Recorded: 2001
- Genres: Power metal, neoclassical metal
- Length: 46:29
- Label: Spinefarm Records
- Producer: Janne Wirman

Warmen chronology
Unknown Soldier (2000)	Beyond Abilities (2001)	Accept the Fact (2005)

Singles from Beyond Abilities
- 1. "Alone" Released: 2001

Professional ratings
Review scores
Source	Rating
AllMusic	4/5
Metal.de	8/10
Powermetal.de	6.5/10

Beyond Abilities is the second studio album by the Finnish power metal band Warmen, released in 2001. It has more tracks with vocals than its predecessor, Unknown Soldier. The CD's name and title track, as well as the track "Salieri Strikes Back" come from the movie Amadeus. "Alone" was released as a single and peaked at number 15 on the Official Finnish Charts.

== Reception ==
AllMusic wrote: "This is actually a very tight album, and the band not only plays but also writes memorable songs." Metal.de called all the musicians extraordinary talented and placed the band in the top league of melodic metal. A reviewer for Powermetal.de highlighted the title track and "War of Worlds" as particularly well-executed and said the band sounds like Stratovarius. Another reviewer for Powermetal.de called the album pretentious and incredibly boring. Vampster gave an overall positive review and noted "Alone" as one of the highlights on the album.

== Track listing ==
1. "Beyond Abilities" – 3:27 (Janne Wirman, Antti Wirman)
2. "Spark" (feat. Timo Kotipelto) – 4:31 (J. Wirman, Kotipelto, Marty Willson-Piper)
3. "Hidden" (feat. Kimberly Goss) – 3:27 (Roy Buchanan, Goss, J. Wirman, A. Wirman)
4. "Trip To..." – 3:07 (J. Wirman)
5. "Dawn" (feat. Pasi Nykänen) – 4:45 (Nykänen, Lauri Porra, J. Wirman)
6. "Singer's Chance" (feat. Timo Kotipelto) – 5:03 (Kotipelto, J. Wirman)
7. "Alone" (feat. Kimberly Goss) (Heart cover) – 3:46 (Billy Steinberg, Tom Kelly)
8. "Confessions" – 2:46 (Porra, J. Wirman)
9. "Salieri Strikes Back" – 5:17 (Porra, J. Wirman)
10. "War of Worlds" – 3:47 (J. Wirman)
11. "Finale" – 6:33 (Traditional, arr. J. Wirman)
12. "Dead Reflection" (feat. Kimberly Goss & Maija Salo) (Japanese bonus track)
13. "E.W.O. Suite No.1" (Japanese bonus track)

== Album notes ==
"Confessions" is a piano solo, but uses quotes from the movie Amadeus. The track "Beyond Abilities" also uses a quote from that movie, "A young man trying to impress beyond his abilities. Too much spice, too, um... too many notes." The track "Salieri Strikes Back" is named after the character Salieri from the movie, and a real-life rival of Mozart.

== Personnel ==
- Timo Kotipelto, Kimberly Goss, Pasi Nykänen: all vocals
- Janne Wirman: keyboards, synthesizers, piano
- Mikko Karmila: grand piano
- Antti Wirman, Sami Virtanen: guitars
- Lauri Porra: bass guitar
- Mirka Rantanen: drums, percussion

=== Production ===
- Arranged and produced by Janne Wirman
- Recorded and engineered by Janne Wirman, Mikko Karmila and Sami Virtanen
- Mixed by Mikko Karmila
- Mastered by Mika Jussila
