= Accept the Fact =

Studio album by Warmen
- Released: 6 July 2005
- Genre: Power metal, neoclassical metal
- Length: 39:17
- Label: Spinefarm Records
- Producer: Janne Wirman

Warmen chronology
Beyond Abilities (2001)	Accept the Fact (2005)	Japanese Hospitality (2009)

Singles from Accept the Fact
- 1. "Somebody's Watching Me" Released: 2005

Professional ratings
Review scores
Source	Rating
Imperiumi	7/10
Metal.de	9/10
Noise.fi	3/5
Soundi	3/5

Accept the Fact is the third studio album by the Finnish power metal band Warmen, released in 2005. Like its predecessor Beyond Abilities, the album's name and title track are based on the film Amadeus. "Return of Salieri" is the last part of a trilogy of songs referencing the composer Antonio Salieri and using quotes from the movie. The album debuted at number 40 on the Official Finnish Charts. "Somebody's Watching Me" was released as a single and it peaked at number 7 on the Official Finnish Charts.

== Reception ==
Metal.de said not much has changed musically from previous albums despite the vocal variety. Soundi said the songs sang by Kotipelto are the best on the album. "They All Blame Me" was said to be disconnected from the rest of the album. Imperiumi called "They All Blame Me" as the best track on the album. Noise.fi said the title track and "Return of Salieri" are the highlights of the album. Vampster didn't recommend a purchase and said the album has a handful of decent songs but doesn't offer anything outstanding.

== Track listing ==
1. "Accept the Fact" – 3:59
2. "Invisible Power" (featuring Timo Kotipelto) – 4:40
3. "Waters of Lethe" (featuring Marko Vaara) – 3:12
4. "Roppongi Rumble" – 3:59
5. "They All Blame Me" (featuring Jonna Kosonen) – 5:29
6. "Puppet" (featuring Timo Kotipelto) – 4:32
7. "Lying Delilah" (featuring Marko Vaara) – 5:03
8. "Return of Salieri" – 4:51
9. "Somebody's Watching Me" (featuring Alexi Laiho) (Rockwell cover) – 3:45

== Album information ==
All music by Janne Wirman. Vocals for tracks 2 and 6 by Timo Kotipelto, track 3 and 7 by Marko Vaara, track 5 by Jonna Kosonen, track 9 by Alexi Laiho. The opening line in the song "Accept the Fact" is spoken by Salieri in Amadeus, "If the public doesn't like one's work. One has to accept the fact, gracefully." The first line in "Return of Salieri" is also said by Salieri, "One day I will laugh at you. Before I leave this Earth, I will laugh at you."

== Personnel ==
- Keyboards: Janne Wirman
- Guitars: Antti Wirman
- Bass guitar: Lauri Porra
- Drums: Mirka Rantanen

=== Production ===
- Arranged, produced and recorded by Janne Wirman
- Mixed by Mikko Karmila
- Mastered by Mika Jussila
