= Live! Visions of Europe =

Live album by Stratovarius
- Released: 7 July 1998
- Recorded: 11 September 1997 in Milan; 14 September 1997 in Athens
- Genres: Power metal, neoclassical metal, heavy metal
- Length: 98:17
- Label: Noise
- Producer: Timo Tolkki

Stratovarius chronology
| The Past and Now (1997) | Live! Visions of Europe (1998) | Destiny (1998) |

Professional ratings
Review scores
| Source | Rating |
|---|---|
| AllMusic | 2/5 stars |

Live! Visions of Europe is a live album by power metal band Stratovarius, released on 7 July 1998 through Noise Records. The album was recorded on two dates in Italy and Greece during the band's tour for their 1997 album Visions.

== Track listing ==
=== Disc 1 ===
| No. | Title | Lyrics | Music | Original album | Length |
|---|---|---|---|---|---|
| 1. | "Requiem" | Timo Tolkki | Tolkki | Intermission | 1:34 |
| 2. | "Forever Free" | Timo Kotipelto | Tolkki | Visions | 6:35 |
| 3. | "The Kiss of Judas" | Kotipelto | Tolkki | Visions | 6:39 |
| 4. | "Father Time" | Kotipelto, Richard Johnson | Tolkki | Episode | 5:09 |
| 5. | "Distant Skies" | Tolkki | Tolkki | Fourth Dimension | 4:33 |
| 6. | "Season of Change" | Tolkki | Tolkki | Episode | 7:18 |
| 7. | "Speed of Light" | Kotipelto | Tolkki | Episode | 3:35 |
| 8. | "Twilight Symphony" | Tolkki | Tolkki | Fourth Dimension | 7:16 |
| 9. | "Holy Solos" | (instrumental) | Tolkki, others | Visions; excerpts from "Hava Nagila" | 11:14 |
| Total length: | | | | | 53:53 |

=== Disc 2 ===
| No. | Title | Lyrics | Music | Original album | Length |
|---|---|---|---|---|---|
| 1. | "Visions (Southern Cross)" | Tolkki | Tolkki | Visions | 10:11 |
| 2. | "Will The Sun Rise" | Kotipelto | Tolkki | Episode | 6:57 |
| 3. | "Forever" | Tolkki | Tolkki | Episode | 3:48 |
| 4. | "Black Diamond" | Kotipelto | Tolkki | Visions | 6:14 |
| 5. | "Against The Wind" | Tolkki, Kotipelto | Tolkki | Fourth Dimension | 5:46 |
| 6. | "Paradise" | Tolkki | Tolkki | Visions | 4:53 |
| 7. | "Legions" | Tolkki | Tolkki | Visions | 6:35 |
| Total length: | | | | | 44:24 |

== Personnel ==
Stratovarius

- Timo Kotipelto – lead vocals
- Timo Tolkki – guitars, backing vocals
- Jari Kainulainen – bass
- Jens Johansson – keyboards
- Jörg Michael – drums

Additional credits

- Timo Tolkki – production
- Mikko Karmila – engineering, mixing
- Mika Jussila – mastering

== Charts ==
| Chart (1998) | Peak position |
|---|---|
| Finnish Albums (Suomen virallinen lista) | 6 |
