= Unknown Soldier (Warmen album) =

Studio album by Warmen
- Released: 24 February 2000
- Genre: Power metal, neoclassical metal, instrumental
- Length: 45:29
- Label: Spinefarm Records
- Producer: Janne Wirman

Warmen chronology
Unknown Soldier (2000)	Beyond Abilities (2001)

Professional ratings
Review scores
Source	Rating
Metal.de	6/10
Soundi	4/5

Unknown Soldier is the first studio album by the Finnish neoclassical/power metal band Warmen, released in February 2000.

== Reception ==
Soundi concluded its positive review: "And once again the whole is greater than the sum of the parts". Metal.de didn't like the whole album and called it avant-garde. Powermetal.de said the instrumental portion of the album barely rises above the status of refined background music. Vampster gave an overall positive review and noted "the beautiful and interesting piano intro" on "Treasure Within".

== Track listing ==
1. "Introduction" – 0:52
2. "The Evil That Warmen Do" – 4:13
3. "Devil's Mistress" (feat. Kimberly Goss) – 5:52
4. "Hopeless Optimism" – 5:08
5. "Unknown Soldier" – 3:19
6. "Fire Within" (feat. Kimberly Goss) – 3:22
7. "Warcry of Salieri" – 5:55
8. "Into the Oblivion" – 3:53
9. "Piano Intro To" – 3:37
10. "Treasure Within" – 4:21
11. "Soldiers of Fortune" – 4:57
12. "Dead Reflection" (bonus track, feat. Kimberly Goss) – 4:43

== Personnel ==
- Janne Wirman – keyboards
- Sami Virtanen – guitars
- Mirka Rantanen – drums
- Lauri Porra – bass guitar

=== Guest musicians ===
- Kimberly Goss (from Sinergy) – vocals on tracks 3, 6 and 12
- Roope Latvala (from Sinergy) – guitars
- Jari Kainulainen (from Stratovarius) – bass guitar
