= Fading Like a Flower (Every Time You Leave) =

1991 single by Roxette

Single by Roxette

from the album Joyride
- B-side: "I Remember You"
- Released: 29 April 1991
- Recorded: July 1990
- Studio: EMI (Stockholm, Sweden)
- Genre: Rock
- Length: 3:51
- Label: EMI
- Songwriter: Per Gessle
- Producer: Clarence Öfwerman

Roxette singles chronology
"Joyride" (1991)	"Fading Like a Flower (Every Time You Leave)" (1991)	"The Big L." (1991)

Music video
- "Fading Like a Flower (Every Time You Leave)" on YouTube

"Fading Like a Flower (Every Time You Leave)" is a song by Swedish pop duo Roxette from their third studio album, Joyride (1991). Written by Per Gessle and produced by Clarence Öfwerman, the power ballad was released as the second single from Joyride on 29 April 1991 by EMI Records. It became the duo's sixth top-10 hit single in the United States, peaking at number two on the Billboard Hot 100. The song reached the top 10 in an additional 12 countries. The accompanying music video was filmed in Stockholm, Sweden.

== Composition ==
According to Ultimate Guitar, the song is written in common time with a moderately fast tempo of 105 beats per minute. It is a piano-based rock ballad in the key of F which modulates a step up to G halfway through the song. The track follows a basic chord sequence of Am–Em–Am–C–G–Am–Em–D in each verse. The first two lines of each chorus have a progression of C–F–Am–G–C–F–G–C, with the second half of the chorus amending the sequence to a shortened C–F–Am–G–F–G. The bridge consists of three repetitions of Am–G–C–D followed by a progression of E–E_{7}–Am–C–G–Am. The duo later recorded a Spanish version of the song for their 1996 compilation album Baladas en Español.

== Critical reception ==
AllMusic editor Bryan Buss described the song as an "insistent rock ballad" and "painfully pretty" in his review of the Joyride album. Larry Flick from Billboard magazine wrote that the duo "slow the pace down" for a "familiar power ballad that should push all the right buttons". Swedish Expressen called it a "powerful ballad" and compared it to "Listen to Your Heart". Dave Sholin from the Gavin Report commented, "In a Top 40 world starved for true pop music, the arrival of a new release by these two Swedish melody makers deserves bells, whistles and every other type of fanfare imaginable. Choosing a favorite from among their dazzling catalog of hits is an impossible task, and once again Per and Marie top themselves with an outstanding example of what hit mass appeal music is all about".

Norwegian Glåmdalen named "Fading Like a Flower (Every Time You Leave)" one of the best songs on the Joyride album. Swedish Göteborgsposten described it as a "Def Leppard-like ballad", while I Dag called it a "pompous arena ballad". Pan-European magazine Music & Media wrote that it's a "melancholic ballad". Brendon Veevers from Renowned for Sound said that it is "pure gold", adding that "though its a ballad and though it touches an emotional nerve, it is also uplifting in its delivery with Per's masterful guitar work and Marie's exquisite vocals uniting perfectly here." J.D. Considine from Rolling Stone remarked Fredriksson's "vocal fire-work" on the song.

== Chart performance ==
Although not as successful as their previous single "Joyride", the song was a top-10 hit in numerous countries. It remains the duo's highest-peaking single on the Irish Singles Chart, reaching number four. On the UK Singles Chart, "Fading Like a Flower (Every Time You Leave)" peaked at number 12. It charted the highest in North America, peaking at number two in both Canada and the United States. It became Roxette's sixth and last US top-10 hit.

== Music video ==
The music video for "Fading Like a Flower (Every Time You Leave)" was shot mostly in the Gamla stan area of Stockholm and features images of Stockholm City Hall.

== Track listing and formats ==
All songs written and composed by Per Gessle.

- 7-inch and cassette single (Sweden 1364047 · UK TCEM190 · US 4KM-50355)
1. "Fading Like a Flower (Every Time You Leave)" – 3:51
2. "I Remember You" – 3:55
- 12-inch single (Europe 1364046)
1. "Fading Like a Flower (Every Time You Leave)" – 3:51
2. "I Remember You" – 3:55
3. "Fading Like a Flower (Every Time You Leave)" (Gatica Mix) – 3:57
- CD single (Europe 1364042)
1. "Fading Like a Flower (Every Time You Leave)" – 3:51
2. "I Remember You" – 3:55
3. "Physical Fascination" (Extended/Guitar Solo Version) – 4:00
4. "Fading Like a Flower (Every Time You Leave)" (Gatica Mix) – 3:57

== Credits and personnel ==
Credits are adapted from the liner notes of The Ballad Hits.

Studios

- Recorded in July 1990 at EMI Studios (Stockholm, Sweden)
- Mixed at EMI Studios (Stockholm, Sweden)

Musicians

- Marie Fredriksson – lead and backing vocals
- Per Gessle – backing vocals, mixing
- Anders Herrlin – programming, engineering
- Jonas Isacsson – electric guitar
- Clarence Öfwerman – keyboards, programming, production, mixing
- Staffan Öfwerman – backing vocals
- Alar Suurna – mixing, engineering

== Charts ==
=== Weekly charts ===
Weekly chart performance for "Fading Like a Flower"
Chart (1991–2019)	Peak position
Australia (ARIA)	7
Austria (Ö3 Austria Top 40)	6
Belgium (Ultratop 50 Flanders)	5
Canada Top Singles (RPM)	2
Canada Adult Contemporary (RPM)	9
Denmark (IFPI)	6
Europe (Eurochart Hot 100)	5
Europe (European Hit Radio)	1
Finland (Suomen virallinen lista)	4
Germany (GfK)	5
Hungary (Single Top 40)	37
Ireland (IRMA)	4
Italy (Musica e dischi)	16
Luxembourg (Radio Luxembourg)	8
Netherlands (Dutch Top 40)	8
Netherlands (Single Top 100)	7
New Zealand (Recorded Music NZ)	22
Norway (VG-lista)	4
Sweden (Sverigetopplistan)	5
Switzerland (Schweizer Hitparade)	3
UK Singles (Official Charts)	12
UK Airplay (Music Week)	3
US Billboard Hot 100	2
US Adult Contemporary (Billboard)	5
US Cash Box Top 100	3
US Adult Contemporary (Gavin Report)	7
US Top 40 (Gavin Report)	3
US Adult Contemporary (Radio & Records)	7
US Contemporary Hit Radio (Radio & Records)	4

=== Year-end charts ===
Year-end chart performance for "Fading Like a Flower"
Chart (1991)	Position
Australia (ARIA)	60
Austria (Ö3 Austria Top 40)	27
Belgium (Ultratop 50 Flanders)	26
Canada Top Singles (RPM)	11
Canada Adult Contemporary (RPM)	59
Europe (Eurochart Hot 100)	37
Europe (European Hit Radio)	13
Germany (Media Control)	24
Italy (Musica e dischi)	95
Netherlands (Dutch Top 40)	90
Netherlands (Single Top 100)	72
Sweden (Topplistan)	34
Switzerland (Schweizer Hitparade)	17
US Billboard Hot 100	44
US Adult Contemporary (Billboard)	46
US Cash Box Top 100	30
US Adult Contemporary (Gavin Report)	27
US Top 40 (Gavin Report)	24
US Adult Contemporary (Radio & Records)	53
US Contemporary Hit Radio (Radio & Records)	30

== Certifications ==
Certifications for "Fading Like a Flower"
Region	Certification	Certified units/sales
Denmark (IFPI Danmark)	Gold	45,000^{‡}
New Zealand (RMNZ)	Gold	15,000^{‡}
United Kingdom (BPI)	Silver	200,000^{‡}
^{‡} Sales+streaming figures based on certification alone.

== Release history ==
Release dates and formats for "Fading Like a Flower"
Region	Date	Format(s)	Label(s)	Ref.
Europe	29 April 1991	7-inch vinyl; CD	EMI	
United Kingdom	29 April 1991	7-inch vinyl; 12-inch vinyl; CD; cassette	EMI	
Australia	13 May 1991	7-inch vinyl; 12-inch vinyl; cassette	EMI	
Australia	27 May 1991	CD	EMI	
Japan	21 June 1991	CD	EMI	

== Dancing DJs vs. Roxette (2005) ==
"Fading Like a Flower"

Single by Dancing DJs vs. Roxette
- Released: 25 July 2005
- Genre: Dance
- Length: 3:05
- Label: All Around the World
- Songwriter: Per Gessle

In 2005, the song was remixed by British dance act Dancing DJs. Credited as Dancing DJs vs Roxette, the remix charted in numerous countries, including Finland, Ireland, Sweden and the UK.

=== Formats and track listings ===
- CD single
- Digital download
1. "Fading Like a Flower" (Radio Edit) – 3:05
2. "Fading Like a Flower" (Hardino Remix) – 6:05
3. "Fading Like a Flower" (Extended Mix) – 6:10
4. "Fading Like a Flower" (Alex K Remix) – 6:08
5. "Fading Like a Flower" (Discode Remix) – 6:30
6. "Fading Like a Flower" (Alex K Bounce Remix) – 5:46

=== Charts ===
Weekly chart performance for "Fading Like a Flower"
Chart (2005)	Peak position
Finland (Suomen virallinen lista)	13
Ireland (IRMA)	13
Scottish Singles Sales (Official Charts)	10
Sweden (Sverigetopplistan)	41
UK Singles (Official Charts)	18

== Other cover versions ==
- A cover of the song was released by Swedish artist Frida Öhrn in 2020.
- A Happy Hardcore cover by Rob IYF and Al Storm featuring Lacie was released in April 2022.
- Cass Phang released a Cantonese version of this song on her 1992 album As Though It Was Love At First Sight, retitled "Thinking only of your love" (只想你的愛).
- Taiwanese singer Lin Meng (林蒙) also released a Mandarin version on her 1992 album Lin Meng Rocks (摇滚林蒙), retitled "I don't want to wait any more" (我不要再等待).
- Finnish power metal band Warmen covered it in 2009 as a bonus track for a Japanese edition of their album Japanese Hospitality.
- Italian power metal band Volturian covered it in 2021 as an homage to Marie Fredriksson.
- Swedish band Amaranthe covered the song in 2024 for their album The Catalyst.

== See also ==
- List of European number-one airplay songs of the 1990s
