= Elements Pt. 2 =

- Cover art by Derek Riggs

Studio album by Stratovarius
- Released: 4 November 2003
- Recorded: April 2002 – February 2003
- Studio: Finnvox Studios and Helka Hotel, Helsinki; Hastfittan; Studio Presidentti
- Genre: Power metal; progressive metal; neoclassical metal
- Length: 50:37
- Label: Nuclear Blast
- Producer: Timo Tolkki

Stratovarius chronology
Elements Pt. 1 (2003)	Elements Pt. 2 (2003)	Stratovarius (2005)

Singles from Elements Pt. 2
- 1. "I Walk to My Own Song" Released: 21 September 2003

Elements Pt. 2 is the tenth studio album by power metal band Stratovarius, released on 4 November 2003 through Nuclear Blast. The album reached No. 4 on the Finnish albums chart and its single, "I Walk to My Own Song", reached No. 9 on the Finnish singles chart.

"Know the Difference" track refers to Serenity Prayer in its refrain.

This album brings elements of doom metal as seen in the first song on the album, "Alpha & Omega," shown as a reaction to the first part in which Tolkki suffered a Bipolar II disorder and manic depression that made him mentally ill and caused him to compose confusing lyrics.

== Critical reception ==
Professional ratings
Review scores
Source	Rating
AllMusic	3/5 stars

James Christopher Monger at AllMusic gave Elements Pt. 2 three stars out of five, describing it as "borrowing liberally" from Helloween's Keeper of the Seven Keys series, and praising the album's "inspired moments" which "succeed with bombast and Queensrÿche-like melodrama." He noted "Alpha & Omega", "Awaken the Giant", "Season's of Faith's Perfection" and "Liberty" as highlights, but remarked that the album "may disappoint some fans with its lack of epics and torch-heavy balladry".

== Track listing ==
All tracks are written by Timo Tolkki, except where noted.

No.	Title	Length
1.	"Alpha & Omega"	6:38
2.	"I Walk to My Own Song"	5:03
3.	"I'm Still Alive"	4:50
4.	"Season of Faith's Perfection"	6:08
5.	"Awaken the Giant"	6:37
6.	"Know the Difference"	5:38
7.	"Luminous"	4:49
8.	"Dreamweaver"	5:53
9.	"Liberty"	5:01
Total length:		50:37

Japanese edition bonus track
No.	Title	Length
10.	"Ride Like the Wind" (Jens Johansson)	4:49

StratoShop limited edition bonus disc
No.	Title	Length
1.	"Alpha & Omega" (demo)	6:35
2.	"Vapaus" (demo)	6:07
3.	"Season of Faith's Protection" (demo)	6:18
4.	"Soul of a Vagabond" (live)	8:02
5.	"Destiny/Fantasia" (live)	9:07
6.	"Father Time" (live)	4:58
7.	"Hunting High and Low" (live)	5:10
8.	"Paradise" (live)	5:42
Total length:		51:59

=== Vinyl edition ===
Side A
No.	Title	Length
1.	"Alpha & Omega"
2.	"Season of Faith's Perfection"
3.	"Awaken the Giant"
4.	"Dreamweaver"

Side B
No.	Title	Length
1.	"I Walk to My Own Song"
2.	"I'm Still Alive"
3.	"Know the Difference"
4.	"Luminous"
5.	"Liberty"

== Personnel ==
Stratovarius

- Timo Kotipelto – lead vocals, arrangement
- Timo Tolkki – guitar, arrangement, engineering, record producer
- Jens Johansson – keyboards, arrangement
- Jörg Michael – drums, arrangement
- Jari Kainulainen – bass guitar, arrangement

Additional credits

- Veijo Laine – orchestral arrangement, choir arrangement, production (orchestra, choir)
- Riku Niemi – orchestral arrangement, choir arrangement, conducting (Joensuu City Orchestra), production (orchestra, choir)
- Mikko Karmila – engineering, mixing
- Kuken Olsson – engineering (keyboard)
- Pauli Saastamoinen – mastering

== Charts ==
Chart (2003)	Peak position
Finnish Albums (Suomen virallinen lista)	4
French Albums (SNEP)	74
German Albums (Offizielle Top 100)	75
Japanese Albums (Oricon)	38
