= Warmen =

Finnish heavy metal band

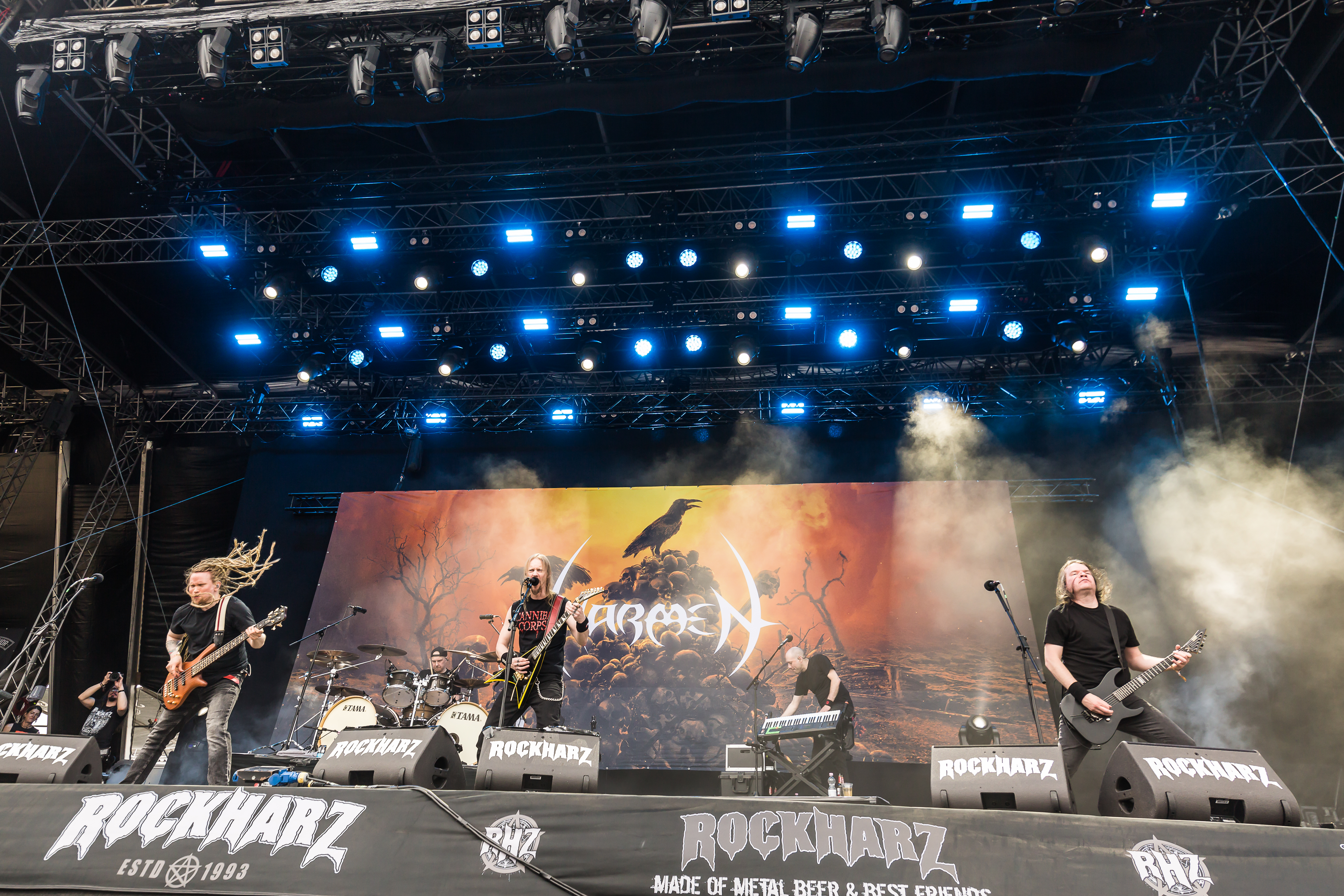
- Warmen at Rockharz 2026

Background information
- Origin: Espoo, Finland
- Genres: Melodic death metal Previously: Neoclassical metal, power metal, instrumental
- Years active: 1999–present
- Label: Spinefarm
- Members: Janne Wirman; Antti Wirman; Jyri Helko; Seppo Tarvainen; Petri Lindroos
- Past members: Mirka Rantanen; Sami Virtanen; Lauri Porra

Warmen is a Finnish heavy metal band assembled by keyboardist Janne "Warman" Wirman. Wirman had played with Children of Bodom since 1997, and in 1999 created the neoclassical/melodic power metal project Warmen focused on instrumental work in the first two albums, with the next three albums heavily relying on guest singers. In 2023, the band added full-time singer Petri Lindroos and moved towards a melodic death metal style similar to Children of Bodom.

== History ==
=== Unknown Soldier (1999–2001) ===
The first incarnation of Warmen was composed of Janne Wirman, guitarist Sami Virtanen and drummer Mirka Rantanen. This line-up recorded and released their 2000 debut album Unknown Soldier, with the collaboration of guest singer Kimberly Goss (from Sinergy), guitarist Roope Latvala (also from Sinergy, later also from Children of Bodom) and bassist Jari Kainulainen (from Stratovarius).

=== Beyond Abilities (2002–2004) ===
The following year, the band saw the addition of Lauri Porra (later in Sinergy and Stratovarius) and Janne's guitarist brother, Antti Wirman (from Kotipelto). In the Warmen Productions Studio (now called Beyond Abilities), this line-up recorded the album Beyond Abilities, which received positive reviews. With a more diverse use of vocals, this album made use of the talent of Timo Kotipelto (from Stratovarius), Pasi Nykänen (from Throne of Chaos) and returning vocalist Kimberly Goss.

=== Accept the Fact (2005–2006) ===
Their third album, Accept the Fact was released in June 2005 and features vocals by Timo Kotipelto, Marko Vaara, Jonna Kosonen and Alexi Laiho from Children of Bodom. Alexi performs clean vocals in "Somebody's Watching Me" (originally by Rockwell), which is rare, since in Children of Bodom he has performed clean vocals in only one song, a cover of "Rebel Yell", originally by Billy Idol. The spoken words on the first track "Accept the Fact" are taken from the movie Amadeus, spoken by the character Antonio Salieri.

=== Japanese Hospitality (2008–2010) ===
The fourth Warmen album, titled Japanese Hospitality, was released on 24 August 2009 via Spinefarm Records. The 10-song effort includes two cover versions — "Separate Ways", originally recorded by Journey, and "Black Cat" by Janet Jackson, featuring a guest appearance by the Finnish pop/rock singer Jonna Kosonen. Other guest musicians that appear on the CD include Alexi Laiho (Children of Bodom) and Pasi Rantanen (ex-Thunderstone).

=== First of the Five Elements (2014) ===
On 9 July 2014, Warmen started a campaign on PledgeMusic to have fans help fund the production of the album, titled First of the Five Elements. This campaign was successful and the album was released on that same year. The album was re-issued in 2023 due to PledgeMusic's bankruptcy, resulting in a limited number of physical copies released.

=== Stylistic change, Here for None and Band of Brothers (2023–present) ===
In late March 2023, the band announced drummer Mirka Rantanen was leaving the band and was being replaced by Seppo Tarvainen. A few weeks later, the band announced Petri Lindroos of Ensiferum as the band's first vocalist. This change would see the band move towards a melodic death metal style similar to Children of Bodom. On 31 May 2023, the band announced their sixth album, Here for None, which was released on 18 August, and is their first album in this new style.

On 19 May 2025, the band announced their seventh album, Band of Brothers, which was released on 15 August.

== Band members ==
Warmen at Rockharz 2026

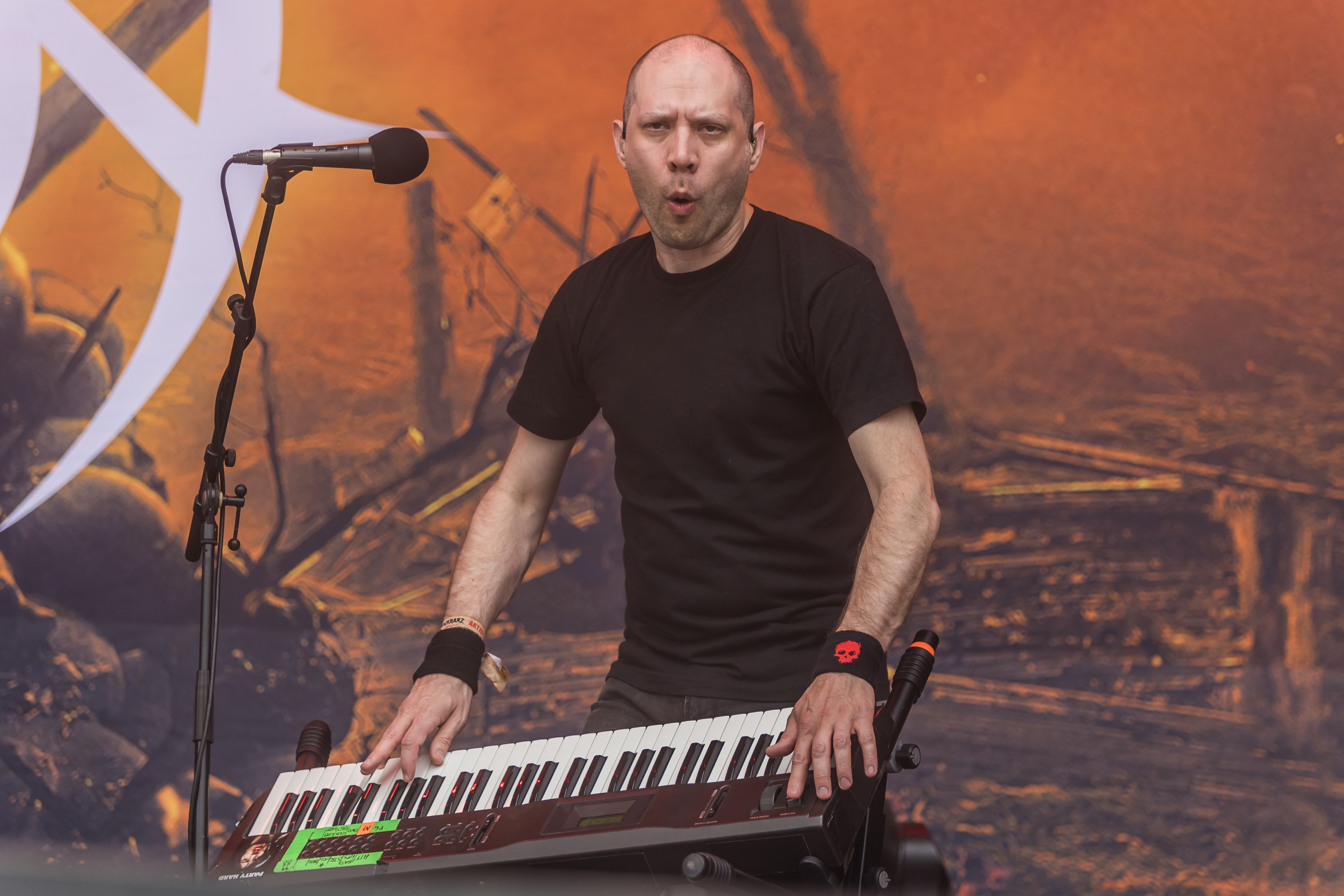
Janne Wirman, keyboards

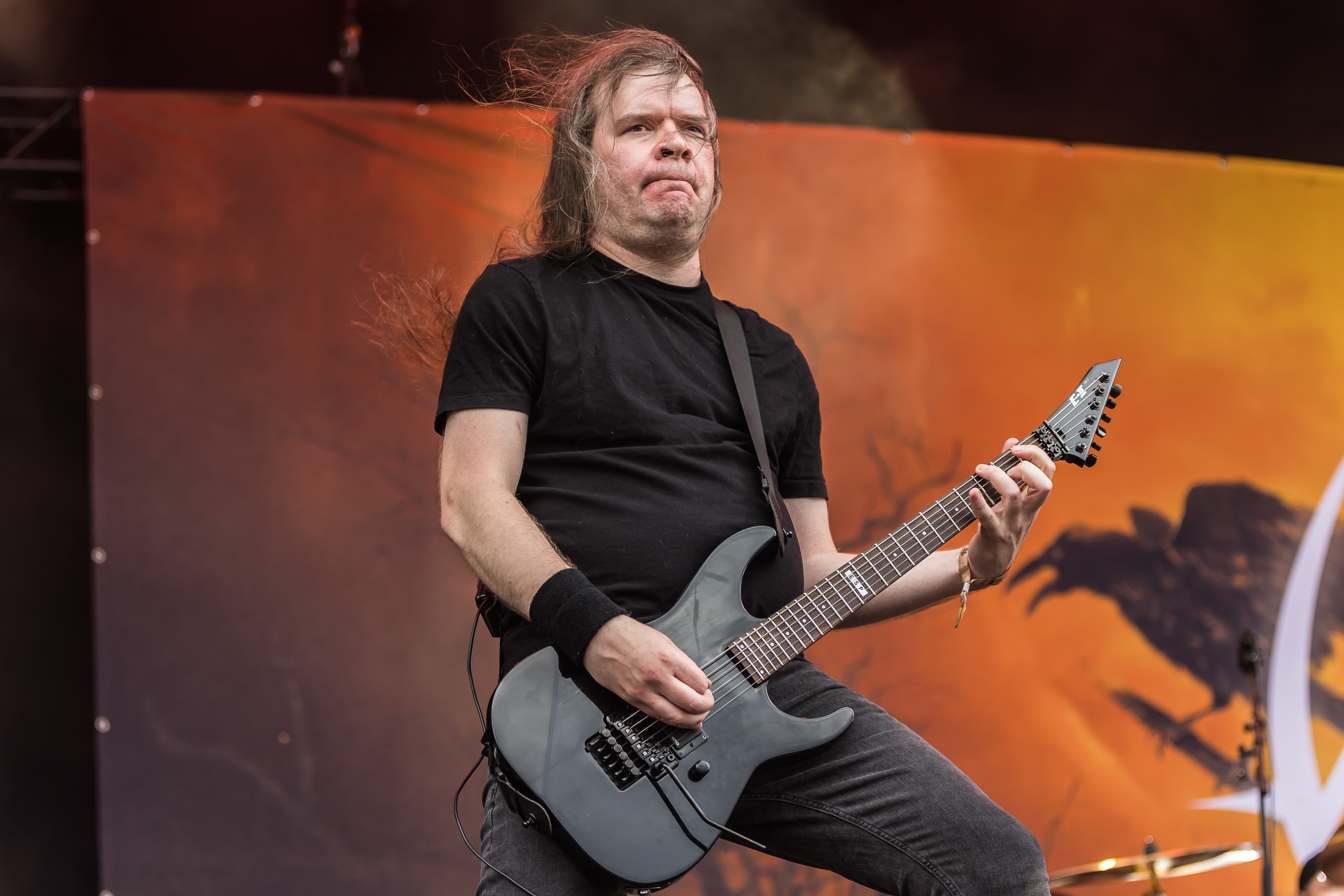
Antti Wirman, guitars

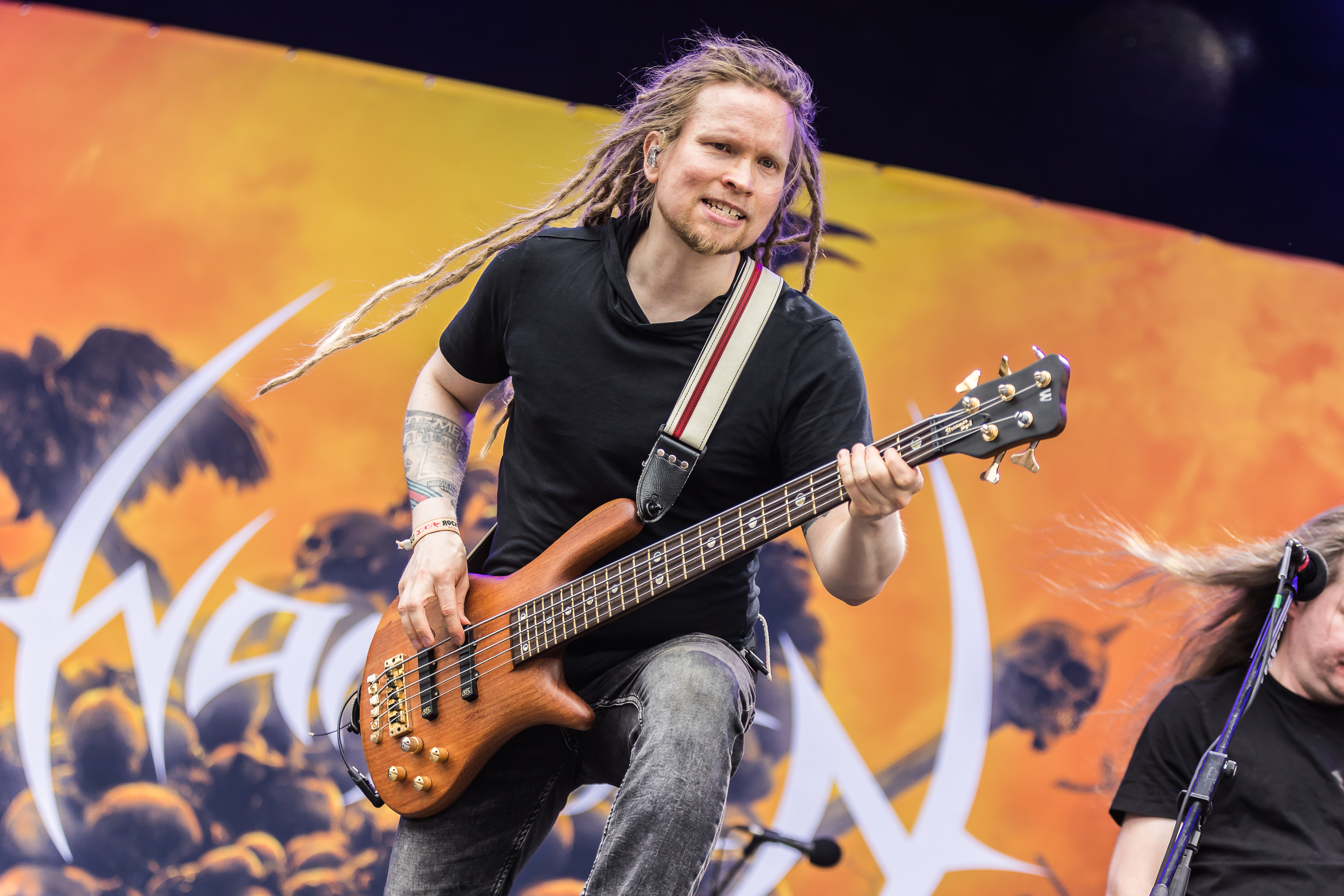
Jyri Helko, bass

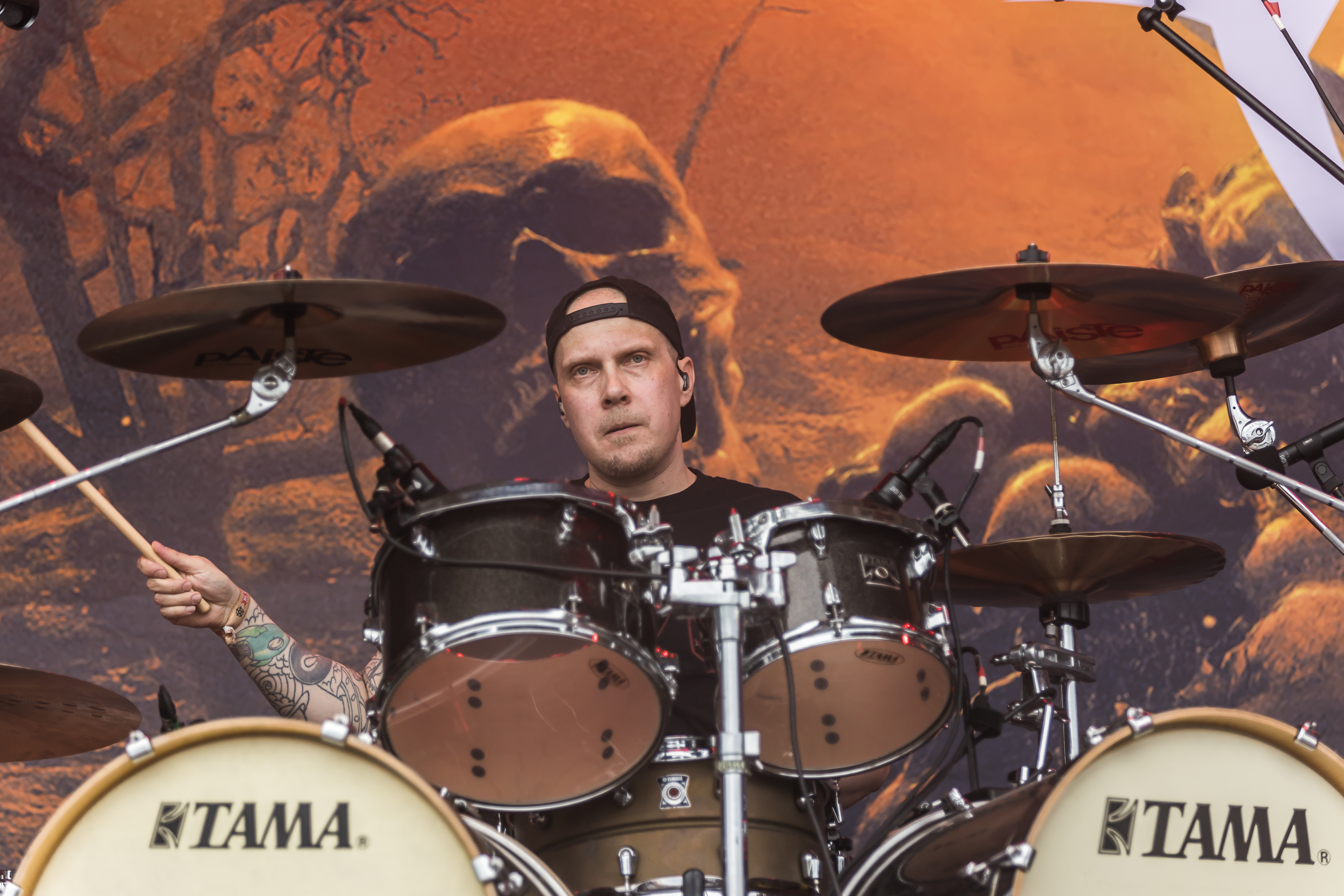
Seppo Tarvainen, drums

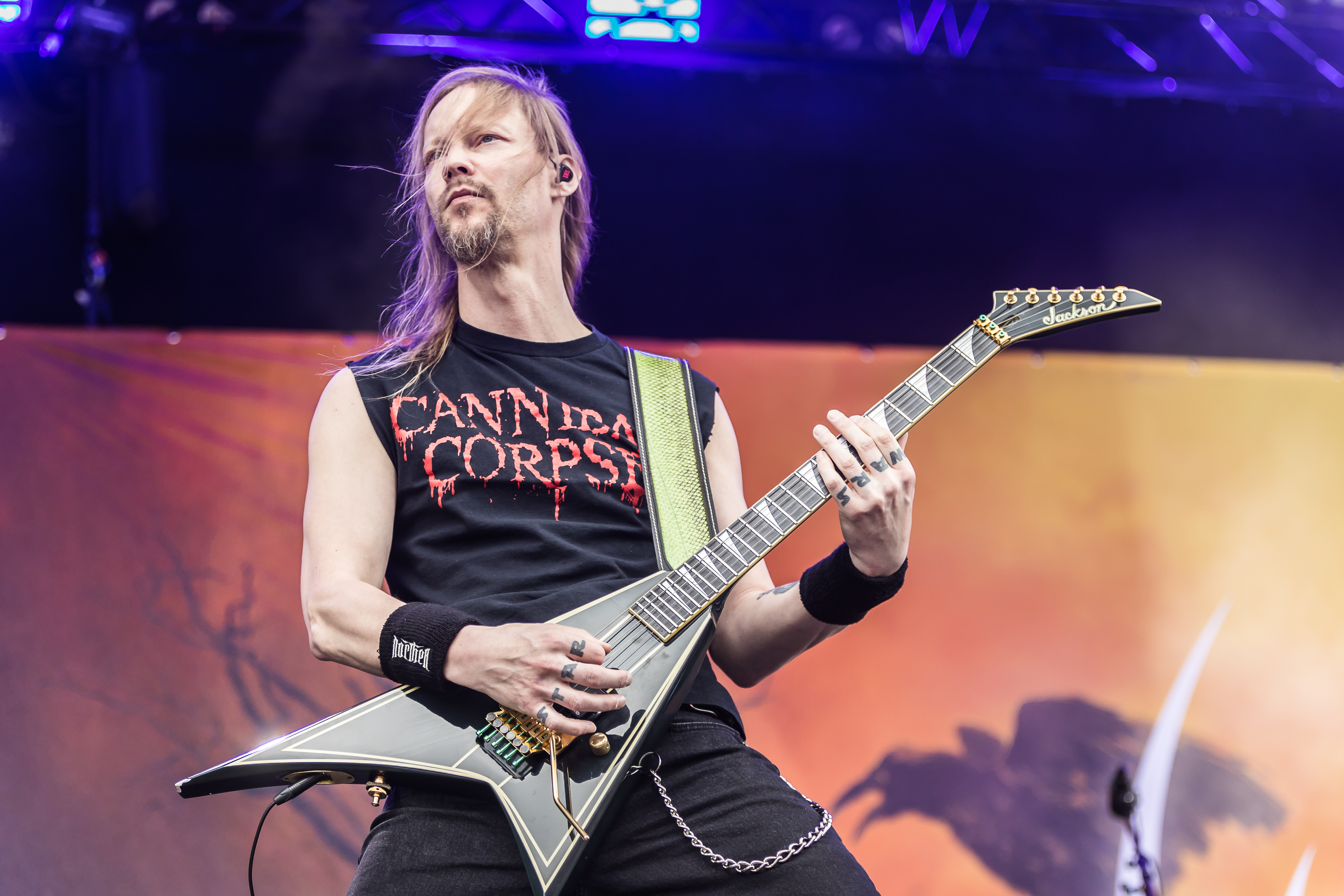
Petri Lindroos, vocals, guitars

Current members

- Janne Viljami Wirman – keyboards (1999–present)
- Antti Wirman – guitars (2000–present)
- Jyri Helko – bass guitar (2009–present)
- Seppo Tarvainen – drums (2023–present)
- Petri Lindroos – vocals, guitars (2023–present)

Former members

- Mirka Rantanen – drums (1999–2023)
- Sami Virtanen – guitars (1999–2009)
- Lauri Porra – bass guitar (2000–2009)

== Discography ==
=== Albums ===
- Unknown Soldier (2000)
- Beyond Abilities (2001)
- Accept the Fact (2005)
- Japanese Hospitality (2009)
- First of the Five Elements (2014)
- Here for None (2023)
- Band of Brothers (2025)

=== Compilations ===
- The Evil That Warmen Do (2010)

=== Singles ===
- "Alone" (2001)
- "Somebody's Watching Me" (2005)
- "Warmen Are Here for None" (2023)
- "Hell on Four Wheels" (2023)
