= Band of Brothers (Warmen album) =

Studio album by Warmen
- Released: 15 August 2025
- Genre: Melodic death metal
- Length: 40:18
- Label: Reaper Entertainment

Warmen chronology
Here for None (2023)	Band of Brothers (2025)

Singles from Band of Brothers
- 1. "Band of Brothers" Released: 30 May 2025; 2. "Nine Lives" Released: 4 July 2025; 3. "Untouched" Released: 20 August 2025

Professional ratings
Review scores
Source	Rating
Imperiumi	8/10
Metal.de	7/10
Powermetal.de	8.5/10, 9/10, 8/10, 6.5/10
Rock Hard	8/10

Band of Brothers is the seventh studio album by Finnish metal band Warmen, released on 15 August 2025. Singles and music videos were released for the title track, "Nine Lives", and "Untouched". The album reached number 24 on the Official Finnish Charts, and reached number 4 in the physical charts.

Founding keyboarist Janne Wirman explained the inspiration for the lyrics and album title, "Many of our lyrics were inspired by the sad fact that a war is raging in Europe. This situation has changed things in our lives that we never imagined possible. I'm over 40, and suddenly there's war in my immediate vicinity. But the title "Band of Brothers" also refers to us as a band. We all grew up with the TV series of the same name."

== Track listing ==
No.	Title	Length
1.	"Band of Brothers"	3:00
2.	"One More Year"	3:37
3.	"Nine Lives"	4:08
4.	"When Doves Cry Blood"	3:09
5.	"Out for Blood"	3:33
6.	"Kingdom of Rust"	3:18
7.	"March or Die"	4:03
8.	"Untouched"	2:57
9.	"Coup de Grâce"	2:51
10.	"Dethroned"	3:56

Bonus track

No.	Title	Length
11.	"The Kiss of Judas" (Stratovarius cover)	5:46

== Personnel ==
- Janne Wirman – keyboards
- Petri Lindroos – vocals, guitar
- Antti Wirman – guitar
- Jyri Helko – bass guitar
- Seppo Tarvainen – drums
