= Coldness (album) =

Studio album by Kotipelto
- Released: 26 April 2004
- Recorded: 2003
- Studio: Finnvox, Beyond Abilities Studios, High and Loud's Elk Studios
- Genre: Power metal
- Length: 40:12
- Label: Century Media
- Producer: Timo Kotipelto

Kotipelto chronology
Waiting for the Dawn (2002)	Coldness (2004)	Serenity (2007)

Professional ratings
Review scores
Source	Rating
AllMusic	2.5/5 stars

Coldness is the second album by power metal band Kotipelto, released in 2004 while Stratovarius was in hiatus.

== Track listing ==
All music and lyrics written by Timo Kotipelto.

1. "Seeds of Sorrow" – 4:09
2. "Reasons" – 3:46
3. "Around" – 5:24
4. "Can You Hear the Sound" – 3:19
5. "Snowbound" – 4:34
6. "Journey Back" – 3:37
7. "Evening's Fall" – 3:56
8. "Coldness of My Mind" – 3:34
9. "Take Me Away" – 3:31
10. "Here We Are" – 6:22
11. "Beyond Dreams" – 3:36 (Japanese edition bonus track)

== Personnel ==
- Timo Kotipelto – lead vocals
- Michael Romeo – guitars on tracks 1, 2, 3, 4, 6, 7, 8
- Juhani Malmberg – guitars on tracks 5, 9, 10
- Jari Kainulainen – bass
- Janne Wirman – keyboards
- Mirka Rantanen – drums

Additional personnel

- Antti Wirman – lead guitar on tracks 9, 10
