= Elements Pt. 1 =

- Cover art by Derek Riggs

Studio album by Stratovarius
- Released: 27 January 2003
- Recorded: April–September 2002
- Studio: Finnvox Studios, Helsinki
- Genre: Power metal; symphonic metal; neoclassical metal
- Length: 61:58
- Label: Nuclear Blast
- Producer: Timo Tolkki

Stratovarius chronology
Intermission (2001)	Elements Pt. 1 (2003)	Elements Pt. 2 (2003)

Singles from Elements Pt. 1
- 1. "Eagleheart" Released: 25 November 2002

Professional ratings
Review scores
Source	Rating
AllMusic	3/5 stars

Elements Pt. 1 is the ninth studio album by power metal band Stratovarius, released on 27 January 2003 through Nuclear Blast. The album reached No. 2 on the Finnish albums chart, as well as reaching the top 100 in four other countries. "Eagleheart" was released as a single, also reaching No. 2 on the Finnish singles chart.

This album was very successful in Europe despite having a new, more atmospheric sound, something that the Finnish had not accustomed their fans to. The album consists of 9 songs (10 in the Japanese edition and the French edition). The limited-edition version has a bonus disc that contains the demos of the album plus an additional bonus "Run Away". Only 2,000 copies were pressed for this edition.

== Track listing ==
All tracks are written by Timo Tolkki, except where noted.

No.	Title	Length
1.	"Eagleheart" (lyrics: Tolkki, Timo Kotipelto)	3:50
2.	"Soul of a Vagabond"	7:22
3.	"Find Your Own Voice"	5:12
4.	"Fantasia"	9:56
5.	"Learning to Fly"	6:22
6.	"Papillon"	7:00
7.	"Stratofortress" (instrumental)	3:25
8.	"Elements"	12:00
9.	"A Drop in the Ocean"	6:51
Total length:		61:58

French edition bonus track
No.	Title	Length
10.	"Papillon" (French language version)	7:00

Japanese edition bonus track
No.	Title	Length
10.	"Into Deep Blue"	5:41

StratoShop limited edition bonus disc
No.	Title	Length
1.	"Eagleheart" (demo)	3:50
2.	"Soul of a Vagabond" (demo)	7:22
3.	"Find Your Own Voice" (demo)	5:12
4.	"Fantasia" (demo)	9:56
5.	"Learning to Fly" (demo)	6:22
6.	"Papillon" (demo)	7:00
7.	"Stratofortress" (demo)	3:25
8.	"Elements" (demo)	12:00
9.	"A Drop in the Ocean" (demo)	5:20
10.	"Run Away" ("Eagleheart" B-side)	4:54
Total length:		65:21

== Personnel ==
Stratovarius

- Timo Kotipelto – lead vocals
- Timo Tolkki – guitar, engineering, record producer
- Jens Johansson – keyboards
- Jörg Michael – drums
- Jari Kainulainen – bass guitar

Additional credits

- Jonas Rannila – choir vocals (track 6)
- Veijo Laine – accordion (track 4), arrangement (Joensuu City Orchestra), production (orchestra)
- Juha Ikonen – orchestral leading
- Mongo Aaltonen – orchestral percussion
- Riku Niemi – orchestral percussion, conducting, production (orchestra)
- Hilkka Kangasniemi – choirmaster
- Mikko Karmila – engineering, mixing
- Petri Pyykkönen – engineering (orchestra)
- Juha Heininen – engineering (choir)
- Mika Jussila – mastering

== Charts ==
Chart (2003)	Peak position
Finnish Albums (Suomen virallinen lista)	2
French Albums (SNEP)	42
German Albums (Offizielle Top 100)	27
Japanese Albums (Oricon)	22
Swedish Albums (Sverigetopplistan)	46
Swiss Albums (Schweizer Hitparade)	91
