= Stratovarius (album) =

Studio album by Stratovarius
- Released: 5 September 2005
- Recorded: April 2004 – March 2005
- Studio: Soundtrack Studios and Sonic Pump Studios, Helsinki; Goldenworks; Timo Tolkki's home studio; New York City
- Genre: Heavy metal; progressive metal; hard rock
- Length: 49:17
- Label: Sanctuary
- Producer: Timo Tolkki

Stratovarius chronology
Elements Pt. 2 (2003)	Stratovarius (2005)	Polaris (2009)

Singles from Stratovarius
- 1. "Maniac Dance" Released: 14 August 2005

Professional ratings
Review scores
Source	Rating
AllMusic	3/5 stars

Stratovarius is the eleventh studio album by power metal band Stratovarius, released on 5 September 2005 through Sanctuary Records. The album reached No. 4 on the Finnish albums chart as well as the top 100 in six other countries. "Maniac Dance" was released as a single, reaching No. 4 on the Finnish singles chart and the top 100 in three other countries.

It is the last album to feature the band's longest-standing line-up which had been consistent since Episode (1996), as bassist Jari Kainulainen would leave Stratovarius later in the year, followed by guitarist and bandleader Timo Tolkki in 2008.

== Overview ==
The release of Stratovarius came after a highly troubled period for the band in 2004, during which they temporarily split up following a nervous breakdown suffered by Tolkki. After a year-long hiatus, they reunited in 2005 and toured worldwide in support of the album, playing for the first time in the United States and Canada.

Stylistically the album displays a dramatic shift from the symphonic power metal sound of previous albums: the songs are more hard-edged and slower, with Tolkki's signature neo-classical shred soloing almost completely absent. Keyboardist Jens Johansson's role is particularly restricted, as well as Jörg Michael's drumming, which features hardly any of his signature double bass playing. Singer Timo Kotipelto also attempts a different vocal approach, mostly avoiding his usual high vocal range. Tolkki has since stated in interviews that he was unsatisfied with the end result of the album due to it being too far removed from the band's true style.

== Track listing ==
All music is composed by Timo Tolkki.

No.	Title	Lyrics	Length
1.	"Maniac Dance"	Tolkki	4:35
2.	"Fight!!!"	Tolkki	4:03
3.	"Just Carry On"	Timo Kotipelto	5:28
4.	"Back to Madness"	Tolkki	7:42
5.	"Gypsy in Me"	Kotipelto	4:27
6.	"Götterdämmerung (Zenith of Power)"	Tolkki	7:12
7.	"The Land of Ice and Snow"	Tolkki	3:04
8.	"Leave the Tribe"	Tolkki, Jens Johansson	5:42
9.	"United"	Tolkki	7:04
Total length:			49:17

== Personnel ==
Stratovarius

- Timo Kotipelto – lead vocals
- Timo Tolkki – guitar, engineering, mixing, producer
- Jens Johansson – keyboard arrangement, orchestral arrangement (track 7)
- Jörg Michael – drums
- Jari Kainulainen – bass

Additional credits

- Max Lilja – cello (track 4)
- Petri Bäckström – tenor vocals (track 4)
- Marko Vaara – backing vocals
- Kimmo Blom – backing vocals
- Pasi Rantanen – backing vocals
- Anssi Stenberg – backing vocals
- "Starbuck" – spoken vocals (track 4)
- Mikko Oinonen – engineering (drums)
- Svante Forsbäck – mastering

== Charts ==
Chart (2005)	Peak position
Finnish Albums (Suomen virallinen lista)	4
French Albums (SNEP)	88
German Albums (Offizielle Top 100)	58
Italian Albums (FIMI)	52
Japanese Albums (Oricon)	39
Spanish Albums (PROMUSICAE)	93
Swedish Albums (Sverigetopplistan)	37
Swiss Albums (Schweizer Hitparade)	92
