= Japanese Hospitality =

Studio album by Warmen
- Released: 26 August 2009
- Recorded: 2009
- Genre: Power metal, neoclassical metal
- Length: 40:57
- Label: Spinefarm
- Producer: Janne Wirman

Warmen chronology
Accept the Fact (2005)	Japanese Hospitality (2009)	First of the Five Elements (2014)

Professional ratings
Review scores
Source	Rating
About.com	3.5/5
Imperiumi	9/10
Metal.de	6/10
Powermetal.de	7/10
Soundi	3/5

Japanese Hospitality is the fourth studio album by Warmen, the side project of Children of Bodom keyboard player Janne Wirman. It was released on 26 August 2009 by Spinefarm Records. The album includes two cover versions: "Separate Ways", originally recorded by Journey, and "Black Cat" by Janet Jackson. Guest musicians include Alexi Laiho (Children of Bodom), Pasi Rantanen (Thunderstone), Timo Kotipelto (Stratovarius), Jonna Kosonen (Nylon Beat) and Marko Vaara.

== Reception ==
About.com concluded: "Japanese Hospitality is an enjoyable album featuring a diverse cast of characters, some catchy songs, eclectic music and only one misfire." Metal Hammer highlighted "High Heels on Cobblestone" and "Don't Bring Her Here" but said many other tracks seem half-baked and unfinished. Metal.de said the two cover songs sound too much like the originals. Imperiumi praised Rantanen's vocals on "My Fallen Angel" and called it one of the best songs on the album. Vampster said the album sounds like it's made in a laboratory and the cover songs lack originality.

== Track listing ==
1. "Japanese Hospitality" (J. Wirman, A. Wirman) – 4:22
2. "Eye of the Storm" (feat. Timo Kotipelto) (J. Wirman, A. Wirman, T. Kotipelto) – 3:26
3. "Goodbye" (feat. Jonna Kosonen) (J. Wirman, A. Wirman, J. Kosonen) – 3:39
4. "My Fallen Angel" (feat. Pasi Rantanen) (J. Wirman, A. Wirman, P. Rantanen) – 4:27
5. "Don't Bring Her Here" (feat. Jonna Kosonen) (Alexi Laiho, J. Kosonen) – 3:01
6. "High Heels on Cobblestone" (feat. Alexi Laiho) (J. Wirman, A. Wirman, A. Laiho) – 3:47
7. "Switcharoo" (J. Wirman, A. Wirman) – 4:09
8. "Black Cat" (Janet Jackson cover, feat. Jonna Kosonen) (Janet Jackson) – 4:23
9. "Unconditional Confession" (feat. Marko Vaara) (J. Wirman, A. Wirman, J. Helko, M. Vaara) – 3:57
10. "Separate Ways" (Journey cover, feat. Pasi Rantanen) (Steve Perry, Jonathan Cain, Neal Schon) – 5:26
11. "Fading Like a Flower" (Roxette cover, feat. Jonna Kosonen) (Japanese edition bonus track) (Per Gessle)

== Personnel ==
- Jonna Kosonen, Timo Kotipelto, Pasi Rantanen: vocals
- Janne Wirman: keyboards, synthesizers
- Alexi Laiho, Sami Virtanen, Antti Wirman: lead and rhythm guitars
- Jyri Helko: bass guitar
- Mirka Rantanen: drums, percussion

=== Production ===
- Produced and engineered by Janne Wirman
- Mixed by Mikko Karmila and Janne Wirman
- Mastered by Mika Jusslia

== Charts ==
Chart (2009)	Peak position
Finnish Albums Chart	36
