= First of the Five Elements =

Studio album by Warmen
- Released: 30 September 2014
- Genres: Power metal, neoclassical metal
- Length: 47:26
- Label: Spinefarm

Warmen chronology
Japanese Hospitality (2010)	First of the Five Elements (2014)	Here for None (2023)

Professional ratings
Review scores
Source	Rating
Imperiumi	6.5/10
Metal.de	6/10
Metal Temple	9/10

First of the Five Elements is the fifth studio album by the Finnish power metal band Warmen, released on 30 September 2014. The creation of the album was financed with crowdfunding. This is the band's last album in their neoclassical power metal era and the final one with guest contributions by Children of Bodom frontman Alexi Laiho before his death in 2020. The album includes two covers of songs by Alice Cooper and Madonna.

== Track listing ==
1. Intromental – 3:31
2. The Race – 3:54
3. The Red Letter – 3:52
4. Ruler of Your World – 4:10
5. Suck My Attitude – 4:02
6. When Worlds Collide – 3:30
7. First of the Five Elements – 3:41
8. Devil in Disguise – 4:28
9. Like a Virgin (Madonna cover) – 3:38
10. Anger – 4:17
11. Human Race – 4:45
12. Man Behind the Mask (Alice Cooper cover) – 3:38

== Personnel ==
- Antti Wirman – guitar
- Janne Wirman – keyboard
- Jyri Helko – bass
- Mirka Rantanen – drums

=== Guest artists ===
- Alexi Laiho – vocals (tracks 5 and 12)
- Pasi Rantanen – vocals (tracks 2, 4, 6, 8, 10 and 11)
- Jonna Geagea – vocals (tracks 3 and 9)
