= Fission (album) =

Studio album by Jens Johansson
- Released: 1997
- Recorded: Moon Path Alpha in Malmö; Starec Grammophone in Växjö; East Side Recorders and Big Noise Studios in New York City; Heptagon Remote in Anderslöv
- Genre: Jazz fusion, instrumental rock
- Length: 68:39
- Label: Heptagon
- Producer: Jens Johansson

Jens Johansson chronology
Sonic Winter (1997)	Fission (1997)	The Last Viking (1999)

Alternative cover
- United States edition

Professional ratings
Review scores
Source	Rating
AllMusic	4/5 stars

Fission is a studio album by keyboardist Jens Johansson, released in 1997 through Heptagon Records (Europe); February 18, 1998 through Pony Canyon (Japan); and on March 24, 1998, through Shrapnel Records (United States). According to Johansson, the album went through an extremely troubled recording process due to several mishaps with Andy West's bass parts, which ultimately never made the album. On his website, Johansson also revealed that the indistinct image on the cover art is actually a heavily zoomed-in section of ice on a car window.

== Track listing ==
All tracks are written by Jens Johansson.

No.	Title	Length
1.	"Hooded Strangers"	10:41
2.	"Phase Camouflage"	6:49
3.	"Zero Sum Game"	3:36
4.	"Acrostic Shibboleth"	8:12
5.	"Don't Mention the War"	10:49
6.	"Race Condition"	7:32
7.	"Crowd Tectonics"	6:15
8.	"Nystagmus"	3:59
9.	"Beautiful Lung Dogs"	10:46
Total length:		68:39

Japanese edition bonus track
No.	Title	Length
10.	"Straffpolska från Sudan"	9:30

== Personnel ==
- Jens Johansson – keyboard, bass synthesizer, production
- Shawn Lane – guitar (tracks 1, 4)
- Mike Stern – guitar (tracks 2, 4, 6)
- Anders Johansson – drums, percussion
- Julian Baker – engineering
- Werner Kracht – engineering
- Peter Nilsson – engineering
- Scud Noonan – engineering
- Krister Olsson – mastering
