= Here for None =

Studio album by Warmen
- Released: 18 August 2023
- Genre: Melodic death metal
- Length: 36.51
- Label: Reaper Entertainment

Warmen chronology
First of the Five Elements (2014)	Here for None (2023)	Band of Brothers (2025)

Singles from Here for None
- 1. "Warmen Are Here for None" Released: 16 June 2023; 2. "Hell on Four Wheels" Released: 14 July 2023

Professional ratings
Review scores
Source	Rating
Imperiumi	6.5/10
Inferno	3.5/5
Metal.de	7/10
Metal Hammer	5.5/7
Powermetal.de	9/10
Soundi	3/5

Here for None is the sixth studio album by Finnish metal band Warmen, released on 18 August 2023. The tracks "Warmen Are Here for None" and "Hell on Four Wheels" were released as singles. A music video for "Hell on Four Wheels" was released, which is the band's first. The album reached number 10 on the Official Finnish Charts.

With this album and the addition of vocalist Petri Lindroos, the band notably switched their style to melodic death metal.

== Critical reception ==
Metal Hammer called the album a strong comeback and a new beginning for the band. Powermetal.de noted "The Cold Unknown" as best track on the album. Vampster said while the album is never extraordinary, its greatest strength lies in its consistent execution.

== Track listing ==
No.	Title	Length
1.	"Warmen Are Here for None"	3:37
2.	"The Driving Force"	4:02
3.	"A World of Pain"	3:09
4.	"Too Much, Too Late"	3:58
5.	"Night Terrors"	3:31
6.	"Hell on Four Wheels"	3:39
7.	"The End of the Line"	4:17
8.	"Death's on Its Way"	3:20
9.	"The Cold Unknown"	3:56
10.	"Dancing with Tears in My Eyes" (Ultravox cover)	3:22

== Personnel ==
- Janne Wirman – keyboards
- Petri Lindroos – vocals
- Antti Wirman – guitar
- Jyri Helko – bass guitar
- Seppo Tarvainen – drums
