= Throne of Chaos =

Finnish heavy metal musical group

- Origin: Espoo, Finland
- Genres: Progressive metal, melodic death metal (early)
- Years active: 1996–2005
- Label: InsideOut Music
- Website: www.tocrocks.com

Throne of Chaos (TOC) were a heavy metal band from Espoo, Finland, active from 1996 to 2005.

Their early sound, as recorded on their debut album Menace and Prayer, has been described as melodic death metal, having musical characteristics reminiscent of fellow Finns Children of Bodom.

For their second album, Pervertigo, the band migrated to a sound more heavily influenced by thrash and progressive metal. For their final album, the progressive-leaning Loss Angeles, released on Inside Out Music, the band shortened their name from Throne of Chaos to TOC.

Taneli Kiljunen originally performed all vocals before damaging his throat and being unable to sing for an extended period. Because of this, Pervertigo was performed with the help of two session vocalists: Pasi Nykänen, also of Warmen, and Niklas Isfeldt, vocalist with Dream Evil, and Pure X. For Loss Angeles, Tuomas Nieminen was added to the band with Taneli offering occasional bursts of harsh vocals.

The band, unable to make commercial headway, broke up in August 2005.

== Discography ==
=== Albums ===
- Menace and Prayer (2000)
- Pervertigo (2002)
- Loss Angeles (2003)

=== Singles, EPs & demos ===
- Equilibrium (Demo, 1996)
- Fata Morgana (EP, 1997)
- Truth and Tragedy (Single, 2002)
