= Silver Mountain (Huerfano County, Colorado) =

American mountain in Colorado

- Dike Mountain
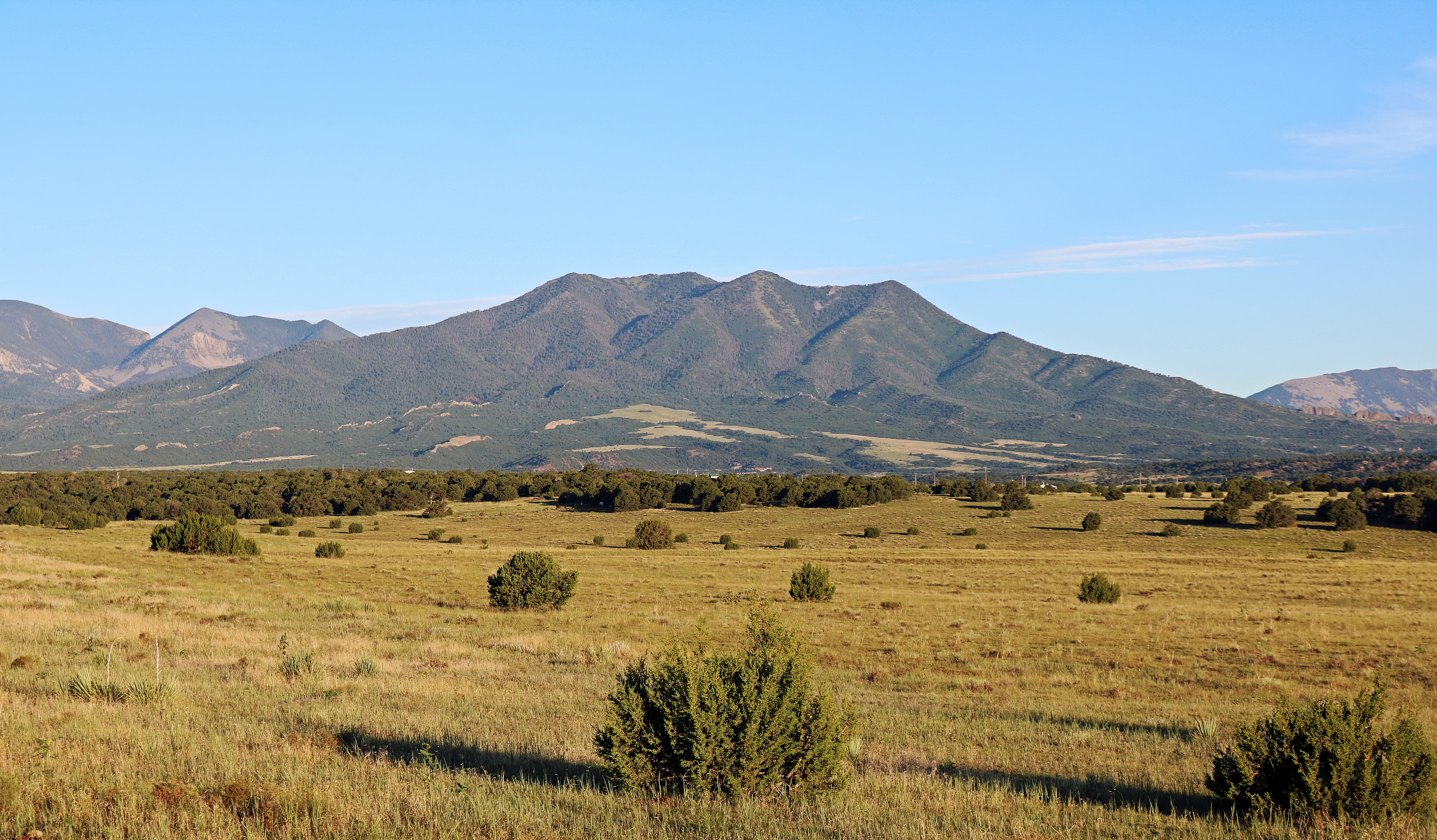
- The mountain on a summer morning. Note the dikes at the base.

Highest point
- Elevation: 10,525 ft (3,208 m)
- Prominence: 1,242 ft (379 m)
- Isolation: 2.87 mi (4.62 km)
- Coordinates: 37°36′55″N 105°06′12″W

Geography
- Location within Colorado
- Location: Huerfano County, Colorado
- Parent range: Sangre de Cristos
- Topo map: USGS La Veta

Silver Mountain, elevation 10,525 ft (3,208 m), is a mountain in Huerfano County, Colorado. It is part of the southern Sangre de Cristo Range of the Southern Rocky Mountains of North America. Silver Mountain is located northeast of Mount Mestas and north of the Spanish Peaks.

== Earlier name ==
The mountain used to be called Dike Mountain for the numerous magmatic dikes that radiate out from its base. The name was changed in the 1870s after miners discovered gold and silver deposits there.
