= Infinite (Stratovarius album) =

- Cover art by Derek Riggs

Studio album by Stratovarius
- Released: 28 February 2000
- Recorded: September–December 1999
- Studios: Finnvox Studios, Helsinki; Hästfittan Estate
- Genres: Power metal; neoclassical metal
- Length: 49:54
- Label: Nuclear Blast
- Producer: Timo Tolkki

Stratovarius chronology
Destiny (1998)	Infinite (2000)	Intermission (2001)

Singles from Infinite
- 1. "Hunting High and Low" / "Millennium"" Released: 2000; 2. "A Million Light Years Away" / "Celestial Dream" Released: 2000

Infinite is the eighth studio album by power metal band Stratovarius, released on 28 February 2000 through Nuclear Blast (Europe) and Victor Entertainment (Japan). The album reached No. 1 on the Finnish albums chart and remained on that chart for nine weeks, as well as reaching the top 100 in six other countries. "Hunting High and Low" and "A Million Light Years Away" were released as singles, reaching No. 4 and 14 respectively on the Finnish singles chart. Infinite was certified Platinum in June 2013, with 21,907 copies sold.

Four bonus tracks were made available for different international editions: "Why Are We Here?", "It's a Mystery", "What Can I Say" and "Keep the Flame", all of which were later released on the band's 2001 compilation album Intermission. This album proved to be more progressive than their previous works Destiny and Visions.

In 2008, long time guitarist Timo Tolkki left Stratovarius and signed over the Stratovarius name, royalties and catalog to Timo Kotipelto, Jens Johansson, and Jörg Michael. These 3 then re-released a special edition version of Infinite in 2010. The re-release came as a two disc set, 3 new songs, 2 demos, 2 live tracks and a digitally remastered album cover.

== Singles ==
"Hunting High and Low" was the album's first single. Released as an EP on February 2, 2000, it reached number 4 in Finland, and stayed there for 5 weeks. It also became the band’s first single to chart outside of Finland, as it peaked at number 21 in Italy. Nuclear Blast also released the official music video for this song. On October 20, 2000, the album's second EP, "A Million Light Years Away," was released, entering the Finnish charts at number 14. Nuclear Blast also released the official music video. The final EP, "It's A Mystery," was later released on vinyl.

== Critical reception ==
Professional ratings
Review scores
Source	Rating
AllMusic	3/5 stars
Blabbermouth.net	7/10 stars
Metalcrypt.com	3.5/5 stars
Ultimate Guitar	9/10 stars

The album was met with favorable reviews, Chee Kam writing for V13.net dubbed it “one of the great power metal records of 2000” also adding “it’s power metal with great rhythm instrumentals and keyboards that take on some great leads giving the music a face. Timo Kotipelto also delivers some high vocals and leads the band from start to finish.” Blabbermouth.net noted that Infinite might be disappointing to longtime fans whoever it also stated “it is by no means a bad album, and it would still serve as a potent introduction to the band's music to all those who have a liking for the YNGWIE/early HELLOWEEN neo-classical metal sound.”

In 2024 The Metal Hall of Fame dubbed the album one of the 75 best metal albums of the 2000s.

== Track listing ==
All tracks are written by Timo Tolkki, except where noted.

No.	Title	Lyrics	Music	Length
1.	"Hunting High and Low"	Timo Kotipelto		4:08
2.	"Millennium"			4:09
3.	"Mother Gaia"			8:18
4.	"Phoenix"			6:13
5.	"Glory of the World"	Jens Johansson	Johansson	4:53
6.	"A Million Light Years Away"			5:19
7.	"Freedom"			5:03
8.	"Infinity"			9:22
9.	"Celestial Dream"			2:29
Total length:				49:54

Japanese edition bonus track
No.	Title	Lyrics	Music	Length
10.	"What Can I Say"	Kotipelto	Kotipelto	5:12

Limited vinyl/box set edition bonus track
No.	Title	Lyrics	Music	Length
10.	"It's a Mystery"	Kotipelto		4:04
11.	"Why Are We Here?"	Johansson	Johansson	4:43

Limited edition bonus tracks
No.	Title	Lyrics	Length
10.	"Neon Light Child"		5:06
11.	"Hunting High and Low" (demo)	Kotipelto	4:19
12.	"Millennium" (demo)		4:10

French edition bonus tracks
No.	Title	Lyrics	Music	Length
10.	"It's a Mystery"			4:05
11.	"Phoenix" (demo)			5:54
12.	"Keep the Flame"	Johansson	Johansson	2:47

== Personnel ==
Stratovarius

- Timo Kotipelto – vocals
- Timo Tolkki – guitars
- Jari Kainulainen – bass
- Jens Johansson – keyboards
- Jörg Michael – drums

Technical

- Timo Tolkki – engineering, production
- Mikko Karmila – engineering, mixing
- Mika Jussila – mastering

== Charts ==
Chart (2000)	Peak position
Finnish Albums (Suomen virallinen lista)	1
German Albums (Offizielle Top 100)	28
Greek Albums (IFPI)	32
Japanese Albums (Oricon)	29

== Certifications ==
Region	Certification	Certified units/sales
Finland (Musiikkituottajat)	Platinum	21,907

== See also ==
- List of number-one albums (Finland)
