= Vergel =

Vergel is both a surname and a given name. Notable people with the name include:

== Surname ==
- Ace Vergel (1953–2007), Filipino actor
- Alfredo Petit-Vergel (1936–2021), Cuban Roman Catholic religious leader
- Alicia Vergel (1927–1993), Filipino actress
- Beverly Vergel, Filipino actress

== Given name ==
- Vergel Meneses (born 1969), Filipino basketball player
- Vergel L. Lattimore, United States Air Force general and military chaplain
