= Silver Mountain (band) =

Swedish heavy metal band

Silver Mountain are a Swedish heavy metal band. The band's name was inspired by the song "Man on the Silver Mountain" by Rainbow. According to AllMusic, they are considered to be overlooked, and were instrumental in the early development of the power metal and neoclassical metal genre. Staff writer Eduardio Rivadavia said they are "one of the great Scandinavian cult bands of the 1980s." The original lineup of the band included vocalist-guitarist Jonas Hansson, guitarist Morgan Alm, bassist Ingemar Stenquist and drummer Marten Hedener. Yngwie Malmsteen and Jens Johansson also performed with the band at certain points.

Their debut album Shakin' Brains was released in 1984. AllMusic said it was "easily one of the most underrated albums -- and best-kept secrets -- of the '80s." Anders Johansson (who is also known for formerly playing drums in HammerFall and Yngwie Malmsteen's Rising Force) played drums on this album.

== Musical style and influences ==
The band's style combines elements of heavy metal music and classical music. Eduardio Rivadavia of AllMusic stated that Silver Mountain represented "the link between the neo-classical metal movement's acknowledged birth at the hands of Ritchie Blackmore and Ronnie James Dio's Rainbow and its subsequent popularization by Malmsteen, Stratovarius, et al."

The band's early material was influenced by Deep Purple. Beginning with their second album Universe they began to incorporate classical music elements and elements of gothic rock.

The band's style has been described as "castle metal" by Loudwire. The band's lyrics occasionally deviate from fantasy and explore real life themes.

== Discography ==
- Demo '80 (1980) - Demo
- Shakin' Brains (1984)
- Universe (1985)
- Hibiya - Live in Japan '85 (1986)
- Roses & Champagne (1988)
- Best (1998) - Compilation
- Breakin' Chains (2001)
- A Reunion Live (2011) - Video
