= Kotipelto =

Finnish power metal band

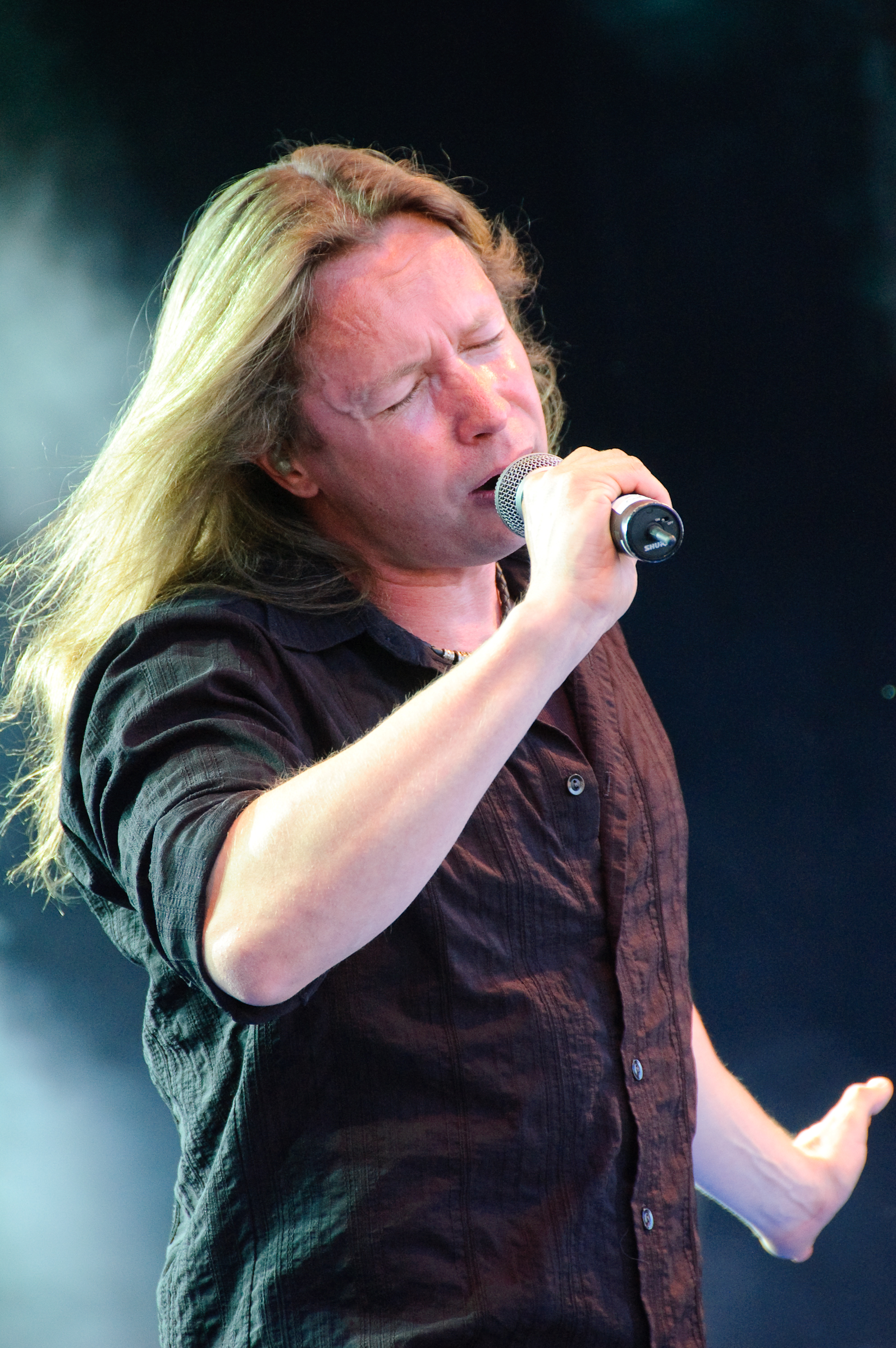
- Kotipelto at Wanaja Festival

Background information
- Origin: Finland
- Genres: Power metal
- Years active: 2001–present (on hold since 2008)
- Labels: Century Media, Candlelight
- Members: Timo Kotipelto
- Website: kotipelto.com

Kotipelto is a Finnish power metal self-named band by Timo Kotipelto, created during a hiatus in activity for power metal band Stratovarius. Kotipelto has been commercially well received in their native Finland, with a top 10 single "Beginning" from his first release Waiting for the Dawn, and lyrics often concentrating on ancient Egyptian themes.

== Discography ==
=== Albums ===
- 2002: Waiting for the Dawn
- 2004: Coldness
- 2007: Serenity

=== Singles ===
- 2002: "Beginning"
- 2004: "Reasons"
- 2004: "Take Me Away"
- 2006: "Sleep Well"

== Members ==
- Timo Kotipelto

=== Guest musicians ===
On Waiting for the Dawn

- Michael Romeo – guitars
- Roland Grapow – guitars
- Jari Kainulainen – bass
- Sami Virtanen – guitar
- Mikko Härkin – keyboard
- Janne Wirman – keyboards
- Mirka Rantanen – drums
- Gas Lipstick – drums

On Coldness

- Michael Romeo – guitars
- Jari Kainulainen – bass
- Janne Wirman – keyboards
- Mirka Rantanen – drums
- Juhani Malmberg – guitars

On Serenity

- Tuomas Wäinölä – guitars
- Lauri Porra – bass
- Janne Wirman – keyboards
- Mirka Rantanen – drums

== See also ==
- Stratovarius
