= Jens Johansson =

Swedish keyboardist (born 1963)

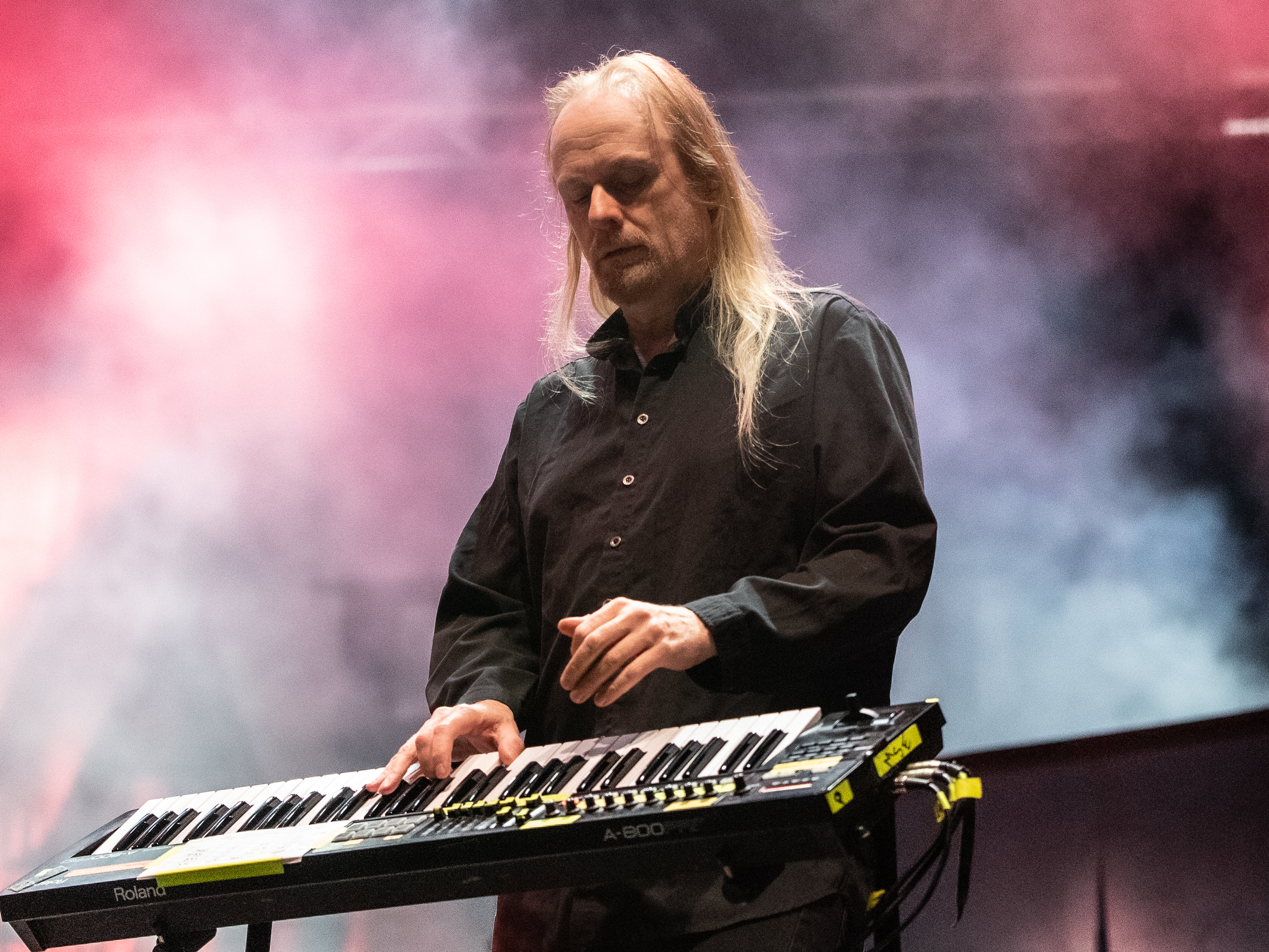
- Johansson performing with Stratovarius in 2023

Background information
- Born: 2 November 1963 (age 62); Stockholm, Sweden
- Genres: Power metal, symphonic metal, neoclassical metal, heavy metal, jazz fusion
- Occupation: Musician
- Instruments: Keyboards, synthesizers, piano
- Years active: 1982–present
- Website: panix.com/~jens

Jens Ola Johansson (born 2 November 1963 in Stockholm) is a Swedish keyboardist and pianist. In the early 1980s he and his brother Anders (drums) played on Yngwie Malmsteen's Rising Force. Johansson is the son of the Swedish Jazz pianist Jan Johansson. Johansson has also worked with the guitar player Allan Holdsworth.

He is currently working with the Finnish power metal band Stratovarius. He is known for his high-speed and technical skills in the style of neoclassical, jazz fusion, and rock.

== Biography ==
Johansson is son of Swedish jazz pianist Jan Johansson and brother of Ex-HammerFall drummer Anders Johansson. He is highly influenced by classic rock keyboardists like Don Airey, Eddie Jobson and Jon Lord. In 1982, the classically trained Johansson left the jazz fusion band Slem and joined the Swedish metal band Silver Mountain, which also included Anders. In 1983 he left Sweden for California and joined guitarist Yngwie Malmsteen as a member of his band, Rising Force. Numerous records and world tours ensued and he stayed with Yngwie until 1989. Johansson also played with the band Dio between 1989 and 1990. Like Anders, he began an ongoing collaboration with Jonas Hellborg in 1989 which has resulted in several progressive and avant-garde recordings, including Dissident, Unseen Rain (an acoustic piano trio record with Ginger Baker on drums) and the hard core progressive fusion record, E.

In 1993, Johansson co-founded a progressive blues metal project, The Johansson Brothers, and recorded a self-titled record. In 1996, with a different line-up, they recorded another album, Sonic Winter, this time under the name "Johansson", with Yngwie Malmsteen guesting on guitar. The last Johansson record, The Last Viking, a more "European metal" oriented album, was released in 1999 with special guests Michael Romeo and Göran Edman.

From 2015 to 2019 he joined Ritchie Blackmore's rock project Rainbow.

Johansson has released several instrumental solo records such as Fjäderlösa Tvåfotingar, Ten Seasons (a piano solo album improvised in the Mark Kostabi gallery, New York), Heavy Machinery (with Anders and Allan Holdsworth) and Fission (with Anders, Shawn Lane and Mike Stern) and many collaborations with other artists, metal compilations and Berends Brothers' band Mastermind.

He co-founded Heptagon Records to distribute his own recordings and that of other musicians, such as guitarist Benny Jansson and bassist Magnus Rosén. Johansson auditioned for Dream Theater after Kevin Moore left the band in 1994 but due to many delays by the band in making a decision he instead joined Finnish power metal band Stratovarius. Since 1995 he has remained in Stratovarius, and still releasing solo albums and appearing as a guest or session musician in other projects.

Johansson is a self-confessed computer nerd, admitting to have started on an Atari ST (which he still owns), and having coded software in C, as well as his own website in Perl. He rejects being considered one of the best keyboardists in the world, as he believes there are many people that are far better than him.

== Gear ==
Johansson has used many types of keyboards and synthesizers throughout his career. Amongst his favourites are the Korg Polysix, Yamaha DX7 as a MIDI controller, (from the Rising Force times to present), the Oberheim Matrix Series and the Roland JV-1080 sound module. He is also fond of the Hammond Organ. Johansson is a computer fan and long-time Steinberg programs user (like Cubase). An example of his interest in computers is his record Fission, which is replete with special effects and sound experimentation. His signature lead is emulation of Polysix on JV1080, going thru early Amp simulation / distortion pedal JD-10 by Morley.

Recently, he has been using PC-base system with Lenovo Laptop Computer both recording and live. And he uses JV1010 as backup on live.

== Band membership ==
Timeline

== Studio albums ==
Title	Label	Year
Silver Mountain: Shakin' Brains		1983
Yngwie Malmsteen: Rising Force	Polydor	1984
Yngwie Malmsteen: Marching Out	Polydor	1985
Yngwie Malmsteen: Trilogy	Polydor	1986
Erik Borelius: Fantasy		1988
Yngwie Malmsteen: Odyssey	Polydor	1988
Yngwie Malmsteen: Trial by Fire	Polydor	1989
Dio: Lock Up the Wolves	Warner Bros. Records	1990
Deadline: Dissident		1991
Stephen Ross: Midnight Drive	Shrapnel Records	1991
Anders Johansson: Shu-Tka		1992
Ginger Baker: Unseen Rain		1992
RAF: Ode to a Tractor		1992
Shining Path: No Other World		1992
Jonas Hellborg Group: E		1993
Snake Charmer: Smoke and Mirrors		1993
Dave Nerge's Bulldog: The Return of Mr. Nasty		1994
Robert Blennerhed: Seven		1994
Smoke on the Water – A Tribute		1994
Tony MacAlpine: Premonition		1994
Anders Johansson, Jens Johansson and Allan Holdsworth: Heavy Machinery		1996
Stratovarius: Episode	Noise Records	1996
Yngwie Malmsteen: Inspiration		1996
Anders Johansson: Red Shift		1997
Stratovarius: Visions	Noise Records	1997
The Johansson Brothers: Sonic Winter		1997
Itä-Saksa: Let's Kompromise		1998
Snake Charmer: Backyard Boogaloo		1998
Stratovarius: Destiny	Noise Records	1998
Mastermind: Excelsior	InsideOut Records	1998
Jens Johansson: Fission		1998
Benny Jansson: Flume Ride		1999
The Johansson Brothers: The Last Viking		1999
Stratovarius: Visions Of Destiny	Noise Records	1999
Mastermind: Angels of the Apocalypse	InsideOut Records	2000
Stratovarius: Infinite	Nuclear Blast	2000
Stratovarius: Infinite Visions	Nuclear Blast	2000
Einstein: Einstein Too		2001
La Leyenda Continua – Tributo A Rata Blanca		2001
Stratovarius: Intermission	Edel Music	2001
Silver Mountain: Breakin' Chains		2001
Andy West With Rama: Rama 1	Magna Carta Records	2002
Space Metal (Arjen Anthony Lucassen's Star One)	Inside Out Music	2002
Benny Jansson: Save the World		2002
Aina: Days of Rising Doom		2003
Barilari		2003
Stratovarius: Elements Pt. 1	Nuclear Blast	2003
Stratovarius: Elements Pt. 2	Nuclear Blast	2003
Sonata Arctica: Winterheart's Guild	Spinefarm Records	2003
Mastermind (Japanese band): To the World Beyond	Black Listed Records	2004
Spastic Ink: Ink Compatible		2004
Kamelot: The Black Halo	Steamhammer Records	2005
Stratovarius: Stratovarius	Sanctuary	2005
HammerFall: No Sacrifice, No Victory	Nuclear Blast	2009
Stratovarius: Polaris	Edel Music	2009
Avantasia: Angel of Babylon		2010
Amberian Dawn: End of Eden		2010
Stratovarius: Elysium	Edel Music	2011
Amberian Dawn: Circus Black		2012
Stratovarius: Nemesis	Edel Music	2013
Avalon: The Land of New Hope	Frontiers Records	2013
Cain's Offering: Stormcrow	Frontiers Records	2015
Stratovarius: Eternal	Edel Music	2015
Stratovarius: Best Of	Edel Music	2016
Stratovarius: Enigma: Intermission 2	Edel Music	2018
Gloryhammer: Legends from Beyond the Galactic Terrorvortex	Napalm Records	2019
Helloween: Helloween ("Skyfall")	Nuclear Blast	2021
Star One: Revel in Time ("The Year of '41")	InsideOut Music	2022
Jani Liimatainen: My Father's Son	Frontiers Records	2022
Stratovarius: Survive	Edel Music	2022
