= Lauri Porra =

Finnish bassist and composer (born 1977)

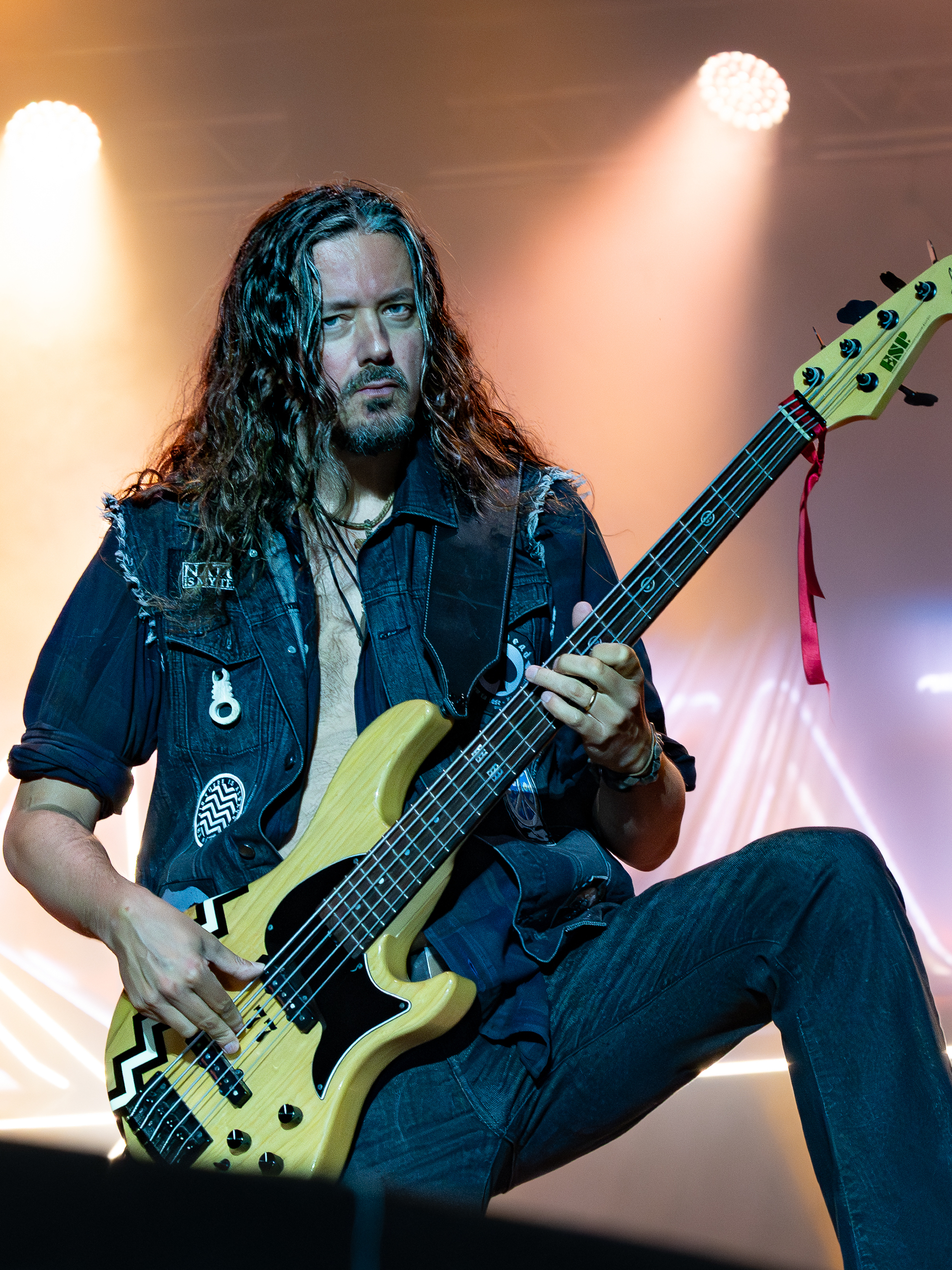
- Porra performing with Stratovarius in 2025

Background information
- Born: 13 December 1977 (age 48)
- Origin: Helsinki, Finland
- Genres: Power metal, contemporary classical, experimental, post-rock, progressive rock, jazz fusion
- Occupations: Musician, composer
- Instrument: Bass guitar
- Years active: 1997–present

Lauri Porra (born 13 December 1977) is a Finnish bass guitarist and composer who has written scores for films and other media, as well as commissions from orchestras such as the Lahti Symphony and the Finnish Radio Symphony. He is also known for his work as the bass guitarist in the Finnish power metal band Stratovarius. Porra is a fourth generation musician, and the great-grandson of Finnish composer Jean Sibelius.

== Early life ==
Porra started to study music at age six when he started to play cello in a local music school. In 1993, he switched to bass guitar and continued his studies in the Helsinki Pop Jazz Conservatory (1994–2004). He has also taken lessons in piano, double bass, trumpet and male vocals. From 1997 to 1999, he was a member of the YL male choir, performing for instance with the London Symphony Orchestra.

== Career ==
Porra has released five instrumental solo albums, including Entropia (a collaboration with Lahti Symphony Orchestra), released in January 2018 on BIS-records. He has also composed music for films and other media. His orchestral compositions have been performed by the Finnish Radio Orchestra, Trondheim Symphony Orchestra, the Lahti Symphony Orchestra and the New Bedford Symphony. His live projects include Lauri Porra Flyover Ensemble, which plays the music from his albums, and the Bach Reimagined project, which performs music based on Johann Sebastian Bach's six cello suites arranged and recomposed for electric bass, cello and electronics. Porra has performed in over 50 countries, with performances ranging from The Proms and Wacken Open Air to Pori Jazz. As a session musician, he has played on over 50 records with styles ranging from heavy metal to contemporary classical, electronic, hip hop and pop albums. His commissioned work Ääniä – Finland’s Official Soundscape, unveiled on Finland’s Independence Day 2025, was commissioned by the Ministry for Foreign Affairs and marks the world’s first official national soundscape. Lauri's large-scale work BASSO — written for 150 bass voices — premiered at Helsinki Festival for an audience of 26,000 at Helsinki Senate Square.

Lauri won the Jussi Award for Best Film Music in 2025 for Tiina Lymi's film Myrskyluodon Maija (2024) In 2016, Porra received the Nordisk Popularauktors NPU Award and was nominated for a HARPA Nordic film composer music award.

Porra is artistic director of Turku music festival and the Vantaa orchestra, founder and artistic director of Unelmien Heinola festival and was artistic advisor of the Helsinki Festival (2015–2019).

== Personal life ==
Porra is married to conductor Dalia Stasevska.

== Discography ==
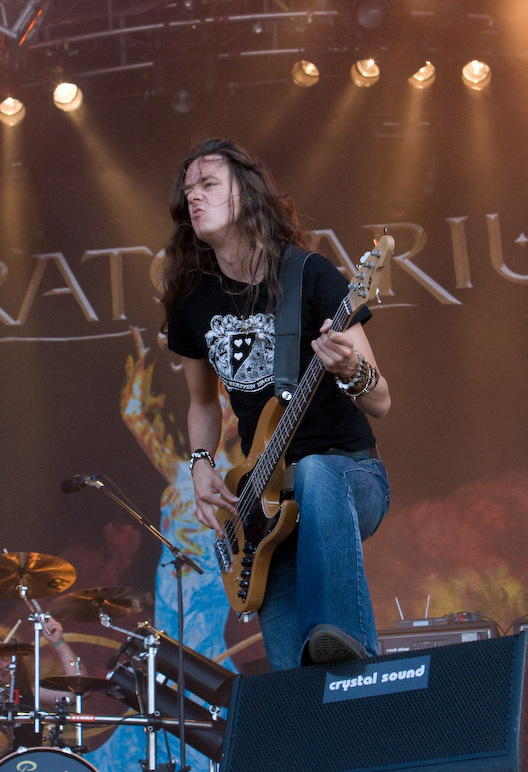
Porra with Stratovarius in 2007

=== Solo albums ===
- Lauri Porra (2005)
- All Children Have Superpowers (2008)
- Flyover (2015)
- Entropia/With Lahti Symphony (2018)
- Dust/With Flyover Ensemble (2019)
- Matter & Time (Aineen ja ajan messu) (2024)

=== Orchestral works ===
- Entropia concerto for orchestra and electric bass (2015)
- Kohta for orchestra and vocals (2016)
- Near & Distant for concert band (2017)
- Domino suite for orchestra and soloist(s) (2017)
- Aineen ja ajan messu for orchestra, ensemble and two soloists (2017)
- Memento for electric bass and orchestra (2019)
- Flyover Symphony for ensemble and orchestra (2019)

=== Stratovarius ===
- Polaris (2009)
- Polaris Live (2010)
- Elysium (2011)
- Under Flaming Winter Skies: Live in Tampere (2012)
- Under Flaming Winter Skies (Live in Tampere – The Jörg Michael Farewell Tour) (2012)
- Nemesis (2013)
- Nemesis Days (2014)
- Eternal (2015)
- Best Of (2016)
- Enigma: Intermission 2 (2018)
- Survive (2022)
- Live Under the Southern Cross - South America 2019 (2022)

=== Film scores ===
- V2: Dead Angel (2007)
- Life for Sale (2011)
- Walker (2012)
- Rat King (2012)
- The Hijack That Went South (2013)
- Nuotin vierestä (2016)
- Look of a Killer (2016)
- Lapland Odyssey 3 (2017)
- Heavy Trip (2018)
- Stormskerry Maja (2024)

=== TV series ===
- Married to a Lie (2008)
- Underworld Trilogy (2011)
- Tappajan näköinen mies (2011)
- Elämää suurempaa (2012)

=== Selected discography ===
- Tunnelvision: While the World Awaits (1999)
- Warmen: Unknown Soldier (2000)
- Ben Granfelt: All I Want to Be (2001)
- Warmen: Beyond Abilities (2001)
- Tunnelvision: Tomorrow (2002)
- Emma Salokoski Trio: Puutarhassa (2003)
- Esa Kotilainen: Turpeisen Baari (2003)
- Peter Lerche: Peshawar Diary (2004)
- Juice Leskinen & Mikko Alatalo: Senaattori ja Boheemi (2004)
- Emma Salokoski Ensemble: Kaksi mannerta (2005)
- Raskasta Joulua: Raskasta joulua (2004)
- Kriya: Kriya (2005)
- Crazy World: Crazy World (2005)
- Ben Granfelt: Live Experience (2005)
- Warmen: Accept the Fact (2005)
- Torpedo: Tietä ja vähän bensaa (2005)
- Raskasta Joulua: Raskaampaa joulua (2006)
- Jonna's Problem: S/t (2006)
- Edu Falaschi: Almah (2006)
- Kotipelto: Serenity (2007)
- Guitar Heroes (2007)
- Manna: Sister (2007)
- Emma Salokoski Ensemble: Veden alla (2008)
- Apocalyptica: Seventh Symphony (2010)
- Uusi Fantasia: Heimo (2010)
- Freeman: Freeman 4 (2011)
- Asa: Asamasa (2011)
- Kalle Ahola: Pääkallolipun alla (2011)
- Tuomas Wäinölä: Human Being (2012)
- Emma Salokoski: Valoa pimeään (2012)
- Stig: Puumaa mä metsästän (2012)
- Crazy World: The Return of the Clown (2012)
- Stratovarius: Nemesis (2013)
- Stig: Niks ja Naks (2012)
- Sini Sabotage: 22 m2 (2013)
- Mikko Hassinen: Elektro GT (2015)
- JVG: Rata/Raitti (2019)
- KXP: IV (2019)
