= Return to Eden (Timo Tolkki's Avalon album) =

Studio album by Avalon
- Released: 14 June 2019
- Genre: Symphonic power metal
- Length: 54:07
- Label: Frontiers Records
- Producer: Timo Tolkki, Aldo Lonobile

Avalon chronology
Angels of the Apocalypse (2014)	Return to Eden (2019)	The Enigma Birth (2021)

Singles from Return to Eden
- 1. "Promises" Released: 15 April 2019; 2. "Hear My Call" Released: 20 May 2019; 3. "Godsend" Released: 17 June 2019

Return to Eden is the third full-length album by Timo Tolkki's Finnish metal opera project Avalon, released on 14 June 2019.

It is the first part of the trilogy created by Tolkki, with the previous albums The Land of New Hope and Angels of the Apocalypse being the third and second parts, respectively.

As with the previous effort, several heavy metal singers were invited to play the characters of the story of the album. Its first single, "Promises", was released on 15 April 2019. The second one, "Hear My Call", came on 20 May with a lyric video. The third and final single, "Godsend", was released with a video on 17 June.

== Critical reception ==
Professional ratings
Review scores
Source	Rating
Brave Words & Bloody Knuckles	7/10
Sonic Perspectives	9.4/10

Writing for Brave Words & Bloody Knuckles, Mark Gromen concluded that "sure the stars were glad to get the extra cash, but certainly not an effort that's going to make people forget their day jobs, nor Tolkki's best work."

Jonathan Smith, at Sonic Perspectives, called the album "a full on return to the good old days of the millennial power metal revolution circa 1998", and pointed the total change in the supporting line-up as well as the presence of lesser known vocalists as two probable contributing factors. He said the album "largely earns its wings through strong songwriting and a highly impressive instrumental display", also praising Lonobile production, and ultimately called it "the greatest album that Timo has put together in about 20 years" (aside from Symfonia's In Paradisum).

== Track listing ==
Return to Eden track listing
No.	Title	Guest vocalist(s)	Length
1.	"Enlighten"	Instrumental	1:08
2.	"Promises"	Todd Michael Hall	4:45
3.	"Return to Eden"	Mariangela Demurtas, Zachary Stevens, Hall	4:46
4.	"Hear My Call"	Anneke van Giersbergen	5:14
5.	"Now and Forever"	Hall	4:10
6.	"Miles Away"	Stevens	4:53
7.	"Limits"	Eduard Hovinga	4:51
8.	"We Are the Ones"	Giersbergen	5:02
9.	"Godsend"	Demurtas	4:25
10.	"Give Me Hope"	Hovinga	5:04
11.	"Wasted Dreams"	Stevens	5:30
12.	"Guiding Star"	Demurtas	4:19
Total length:			54:07

Japanese bonus track
No.	Title	Length
13.	"Godsend (instrumental version)"	4:25
Total length:		58:32

== Personnel ==
Per sources.

Instrumentalists

- Timo Tolkki (ex-Stratovarius, Symfonia, Revolution Renaissance) – lead guitars
- Aldo Lonobile (Secret Sphere) – guitars
- Andrea Buratto (Secret Sphere) – bass
- Antonio Agate (Secret Sphere) – piano and keyboards
- Giulio Capone (Temperance, ex-Bejelit, Black Oceans, Moonlight Haze) – drums, piano and keyboards

Vocalists

- Todd Michael Hall (Riot V)
- Anneke van Giersbergen (ex-The Gathering, Anneke van Giersbergen, VUUR)
- Mariangela Demurtas (Tristania, Ardours)
- Eduard Hovinga (ex-Elegy)
- Zachary Stevens (ex-Savatage, Circle II Circle)

Production

- Timo Tolkki & Aldo Lonobile - production

== Charts ==
Chart performance for Return to Eden
Chart (2019)	Peak position
Swiss Albums (Schweizer Hitparade)	93
