= Avalon (Finnish band) =

Finnish metal opera project

Timo Tolkki's Avalon
- Origin: Finland
- Genres: Symphonic power metal
- Years active: 2013–2021
- Label: Frontiers
- Members: Timo Tolkki
- Website: tolkki.org

Timo Tolkki's Avalon (also known simply as Avalon) was a Finnish metal opera project created by Timo Tolkki (formerly of Stratovarius, Revolution Renaissance and Symfonia) in 2013.

According to Tolkki "I find the Metal Opera concept fascinating and logical to me at this point of my career. I love classical music and just like in Classical Opera, in the Metal Opera you can also create stories and have almost limitless possibilities musically".

== History ==
=== Foundation and The Land of New Hope (2013) ===
The project, including its name, was conceived by Frontiers Records's founder Serafino Perugino in 2010. He called Tolkki back then and asked if he wanted to do a metal opera like that.

The project's debut album, The Land of New Hope, was released on 17 May 2013 through Frontiers Records. The album features performances by vocalists Elize Ryd, Rob Rock, Michael Kiske, Russell Allen, Sharon den Adel and Tony Kakko, as well as the participation of guest musicians Alex Holzwarth on drums and both Jens Johansson and Derek Sherinian on keyboards.

Tobias Sammet, German musician and mentor of Avantasia, another metal opera which had its 6th album released in March 2013, received the news of Timo Tolkki's own project with initial sarcasm, stating: "Wow, someone is extraordinarily creative here: the title, the guests, the timing... What a funny coincidence, isn't it?! But there have been thousands of Metal Operas, especially after Avantasia. Such is business...". However, he later stated: "There are a lot of metal operas out there, and I have to deal with that. If something is very successful or even not successful then other people may feel inspired by it. It's Timo Tolkki (laughs) what can I say, he's a great guy and he does what he does. I wish him the best of luck."

When asked about if he was aware that this project would be compared to Avantasia, Timo replied that "Nobody owns a franchise to 'metal operas' which is not really an operatic format because it doesn't have any real dialogue between the singers."

=== Angels of the Apocalypse (2014) ===
In October 2013 Timo launched a news website for the project in which he announced the sequel to The Land of New Hope, which was provisionally titled Avalon II. The cast of guest musicians will be revealed one by one. Simone Simons of Epica fame is the first confirmed singer. Floor Jansen will play the leading role. It was also announced that Timo's former bandmates in Stratovarius, drummer Tuomo Lassila and keyboardist Antti Ikonen will play on this album.

On 28 January Timo revealed title of the album (Angels of the Apocalypse) and the rest of the cast: Fabio Lione (Rhapsody of Fire, Angra), David DeFeis (Virgin Steele), Elize Ryd (Amaranthe) and Caterina Nix. Timo also announced that there will be a contest for guitar and keyboard players, with the winners getting a chance to perform a solo with him in one of the songs.

A European tour was planned for May 2014, coinciding with the release of the album.

=== Return to Eden (2019), The Enigma Birth (2021) and dissolution ===
In early 2019, Timo Tolkki announced the third Avalon album and remaining part of the Avalon trilogy, Return to Eden, with the main working song, "Promises".

The fourth Avalon studio album, The Enigma Birth was released on 18 June 2021, extending the Avalon conceptual saga. Shortly after the album's release, Timo Tolkki announced the end of the Avalon project after a dispute with Frontiers Records.

== Members ==
=== Instrumentalists ===
Name	Associated bands	The Land of New Hope	Angels of the Apocalypse	Return to Eden	The Enigma Birth
(Finland) Timo Tolkki	Stratovarius, Revolution Renaissance, Symfonia, Allen-Lande	guitar, bass	guitar, bass	guitar	guitar
(Germany) Alex Holzwarth	Rhapsody of Fire	drums			
(Finland) Mikko Härkin	Sonata Arctica, Symfonia, Luca Turilli's Rhapsody	keyboards			
(United States) Derek Sherinian	Dream Theater, Black Country Communion, Yngwie Malmsteen, Planet X, Sons of Apollo	keyboard solo on track 8			
(Sweden) Jens Johansson	Stratovarius, Yngwie Malmsteen, Cain's Offering	keyboard solo on track 8			
(Finland) Sami Boman	Silentium	orchestration			
(Finland) Tuomo Lassila	Stratovarius		drums		
(Finland) Antti Ikonen	Stratovarius		keyboards		
(France) Nicolas Jeudy			orchestration		
(Italy) Andrea Buratto	Secret Sphere			bass	
(Italy) Giulio Capone	Temperance			drums, piano, keyboards	
(Finland) Santtu Lehtiniemi				additional guitar	
(Italy) Aldo Lonobile	Secret Sphere, Death SS			guitar	guitar
(Italy) Antonio Agate	Secret Sphere, Icon & The Black Roses			piano, keyboards, orchestration	piano, keyboards, orchestration
(Italy) Andrea Arcangeli	Concept, DGM				bass
(Italy) Marco Lazzarini	Secret Sphere				drums, piano, keyboards
(Italy) Federico Maraucci					additional guitar

=== Singers ===
Name	Associated bands	The Land of New Hope	Angels of the Apocalypse	Return to Eden	The Enigma Birth
(United States) Rob Rock	Impellitteri	lead vocals on tracks 1–2, 4–5, 7–8			
(United States) Russell Allen	Symphony X, Adrenaline Mob, Allen-Lande, Star One	lead vocals on tracks 1–2, 4			
(Germany) Michael Kiske	Unisonic, Place Vendome, Kiske/Somerville, Helloween	lead vocals on track 10			
(Finland) Tony Kakko	Sonata Arctica	lead vocals on track 5			
(Netherlands) Sharon den Adel	Within Temptation	lead vocals on track 6			
(Sweden) Elize Ryd	Amaranthe	lead vocals on tracks 1–4, 6, 9	lead vocals on tracks 9–10		
(Netherlands) Floor Jansen	Nightwish, ReVamp, After Forever, Star One, Ayreon		lead vocals on tracks 3, 6–7, 10		
(Netherlands) Simone Simons	Epica		lead vocals on tracks 9–10		
(United States) David DeFeis	Virgin Steele		lead vocals on track 4		
(Italy) Fabio Lione	Rhapsody of Fire, Vision Divine, Angra		lead vocals on tracks 1–2, 5		lead vocals on tracks 9, 12
(Chile) Caterina Nix	Aghonya, Chaos Magic		lead vocals on tracks 9–10		lead vocals on tracks 2–3
(United States) Zachary Stevens	Circle II Circle, Savatage		lead vocals on track 8	lead vocals on tracks 3, 6, 11	
(United States) Todd Michael Hall	Riot V			lead vocals on tracks 2–3, 5	
(Netherlands) Anneke van Giersbergen	The Gathering, Anneke van Giersbergen			lead vocals on tracks 4, 8	
(Italy) Mariangela Demurtas	Tristania			lead vocals on tracks 3, 9, 12	
(Netherlands) Eduard Hovinga	Elegy			lead vocals on tracks 7, 10	
(Italy) Chiara Tricarico	Temperance			backing vocals on track 9	
(Canada) James LaBrie	Dream Theater, MullMuzzler				lead vocals on track 5
(Sweden) Jake E	ex-Amaranthe, Cyhra				lead vocals on tracks 6, 10
(Brazil) Marina La Torraca	Phantom Elite, Exit Eden				lead vocals on tracks 7, 11
(Canada) Brittney Hayes	Unleash the Archers				lead vocals on tracks 3, 10
(Brazil) Raphael Mendes	Icon of Sin				lead vocals on tracks 4, 8
(Norway) PelleK					lead vocals on track 1

== Discography ==
Year	Album	Peak positions			
Year	Album	BEL (Wa)	FIN	SWE	SWI
2013	The Land of New Hope	102	7	42	59
2014	Angels of the Apocalypse	—	42	—	—
2019	Return to Eden	—	7	—	—
2021	The Enigma Birth	—	46	—	43
