= The Enigma Birth =

Studio album by Avalon
- Released: June 18, 2021
- Genre: Symphonic power metal
- Length: 58:43
- Label: Frontiers Records
- Producer: Timo Tolkki, Aldo Lonobile

Avalon chronology
Return to Eden (2019)	The Enigma Birth (2021)

Singles from The Enigma Birth
- 1. "Beauty and War" Released: 14 April 2021; 2. "Master of Hell" Released: 27 April 2021; 3. "The Fire and the Sinner" Released: 10 May 2021; 4. "Beautiful Lie" Released: 18 June 2021

The Enigma Birth is the fourth and final full-length album by Timo Tolkki's Finnish metal opera project Avalon, released on June 18, 2021.

As with the previous effort, several heavy metal singers were invited to play the characters of the story of the album.

The album was announced on 14 April 2021 alongside a video for "Beauty and War" (featuring Raphael Mendes). On 27 of the same month, a video for "Master of Hell", also featuring Mendes, was released. On 10 May, Avalon released a video for "The Fire and the Sinner" (featuring Jake E and Brittney Slayes). On the day of the album's release, a lyric video for "Beautiful Lie" (featuring James LaBrie) was published.

According to Tolkki, he created a fourth part for the trilogy out of contractual obligations with Frontiers Records. In September, he wrote around 10 tracks for the album and the label picked about half for the final track list; the remaining songs were written by a team of unacquainted Italian songwriters. He also claimed he doesn't know most of the guests, who were all suggested by the label.

== Critical reception ==
Professional ratings
Review scores
Source	Rating
Metal.de	Positive
Sonic Perspectives	9.4/10

Writing for Metal.de, Jannik Kleemann praised the performances of the guest singers, called Tolkki "a good guitarist" that "can write good material", but said "the atmosphere of projects like Avantasia is clearly denser". Nevertheless, he concluded his review by saying that "what remains is a decent, symphonic power metal album".

Jonathan Smith, at Sonic Perspectives, said that "for an album that isn't that much of a stylistic enigma, it nevertheless provides an assortment of anthems so fun and varied that frequent replays are a virtual certainty" and ultimately called it "an album not to be missed".

== Track listing ==
The Enigma Birth track listing
No.	Title	Guest vocalist(s)	Length
1.	"The Enigma Birth"	PelleK	4:33
2.	"I Just Collapse"	Caterina Nix	6:13
3.	"Memories"	Nix, Brittney Slayes	5:43
4.	"Master of Hell"	Raphael Mendes	3:51
5.	"Beautiful Lie"	James LaBrie	3:51
6.	"Truth"	Jake E	3:48
7.	"Another Day"	Marina La Torraca	5:04
8.	"Beauty and War"	Mendes	5:17
9.	"Dreaming"	Fabio Lione	6:30
10.	"The Fire and the Sinner"	E, Slayes	3:05
11.	"Time"	Torraca	5:58
12.	"Without Fear"	Lione	4:50
Total length:			58:43

Japan edition bonus track
No.	Title	Length
13.	"The Fire and the Sinner" (Acoustic Version)	3:13
Total length:		62:04

== Personnel ==
Per sources.

Instrumentalists

- Timo Tolkki (ex-Stratovarius, Symfonia, Revolution Renaissance) – guitars
- Aldo Lonobile (Secret Sphere) – guitars
- Federico Maraucci – additional guitars
- Andrea Arcangeli (Concept, DGM) – bass
- Antonio Agate (Secret Sphere) – keyboards and orchestrations
- Marco Lazzarini (Secret Sphere) – drums

Vocalists

- James LaBrie (Dream Theater, MullMuzzler)
- Jake E (ex-Amaranthe, Cyhra)
- Marina La Torraca (Phantom Elite, Exit Eden)
- Brittney Hayes (Unleash the Archers)
- Raphael Mendes (Icon of Sin)
- Fabio Lione (ex-Labyrinth, ex-Vision Divine, ex-Rhapsody of Fire, Turilli / Lione Rhapsody, Angra, Eternal Idol)
- Caterina Nix (Chaos Magic)
- PelleK

Production

- Timo Tolkki & Aldo Lonobile - production

== Charts ==
Chart performance for The Enigma Birth
Chart (2021)	Peak position
Finnish Albums (Suomen virallinen lista)	46
Swiss Albums (Schweizer Hitparade)	43
