= Trinity (Revolution Renaissance album) =

Studio album by Revolution Renaissance
- Released: 24 September 2010
- Genre: Power metal
- Length: 47:20
- Label: Napalm Records

Revolution Renaissance chronology
Age of Aquarius (2009)	Trinity (2010)

Trinity is the third and final album by Revolution Renaissance, released on 24 September 2010.

== Track listing ==
1. "Marching with the Fools" - 5:07
2. "Falling to Rise" - 4:12
3. "A Lot Like Me" - 4:32
4. "The World Doesn`t Get to Me" - 4:24
5. "Crossing the Rubicon" - 5:18
6. "Just Let It Rain" - 4:34
7. "Dreamchild" - 4:30
8. "Trinity" - 10:16
9. "Frozen Winter Heart" - 4:27

== Line Up ==
- Gus Monsanto - vocals
- Timo Tolkki - guitar
- Magnus Rosén - bass
- Bob Katsionis - Keyboards
- Bruno Agra - drums

== Reception ==
Professional ratings
Review scores
Source	Rating
Danger Dog	3.5/5 stars
