= All That Remains (EP) =

EP by Circle to Circle
- Released: February 21, 2005
- Recorded: 2004–2005
- Genre: Heavy metal Progressive metal
- Length: 25:18
- Label: AFM Records

Circle to Circle chronology
Watching in Silence (2003)	All That Remains (2005)	The Middle of Nowhere (2005)

Professional ratings
Review scores
Source	Rating
Allmusic	3/5 stars

All That Remains is a 2005 release by Circle II Circle. This was an EP distributed by AFM Records to demonstrate to fans the new line-up of the band that debuted on the resulting studio album, The Middle of Nowhere, which was released later in 2005. The EP featured two songs which would feature on that album (including the title track), two new tracks, and an edit of the title track.

== Track listing ==
1. "All That Remains" (Single Edit) - 3:53
2. "In This Life" - 5:46
3. "Strung Out" - 5:29
4. "Shadows" - 4:52
5. "All That Remains" (Album Version) - 5:18

== Personnel ==
- Zachary Stevens – lead vocals, keyboards
- Evan Christopher – guitars
- Andrew Lee – guitars
- Mitch Stewart – bass guitar
- Tom Drennan – drums
