= Age of Aquarius (Revolution Renaissance album) =

Studio album by Revolution Renaissance
- Released: 23 March 2009
- Recorded: September–November 2008
- Genre: Power metal, symphonic metal, heavy metal
- Label: Scarlet Records, JVC
- Producer: Timo Tolkki

Revolution Renaissance chronology
New Era (2008)	Age of Aquarius (2009)	Trinity (2010)

Professional ratings
Review scores
Source	Rating
Dangerdog	4.5/5 stars

Age of Aquarius is the second studio album by the Finnish power metal band Revolution Renaissance. It is the first album featuring singer Gus Monsanto, drummer Bruno Agra, bassist Justin Biggs and keyboardist Mike Khalilov. It was released on 25 March 2009 in South-East Asia by JVC/Victor Entertainment and on 23 March 2009 in the rest of the world by Scarlet Records. A promotional video clip for the title track was recorded and produced in late 2008. The band released the song"Age of Aquarius" and "Ghost of Fallen Grace" as a free, high-quality mp3 download on their website.

== Track listing ==
All tracks written by Tolkki, Agra and Monsanto.

1. "Age of Aquarius" – 4:38
2. "Sins of My Beloved" – 5:28
3. "Ixion's Wheel" – 4:25
4. "Behind the Mask" – 2:54
5. "Ghost of Fallen Grace" – 4:45
6. "Heart of All" – 6:39
7. "So She Wears Black" – 7:11
8. "Kyrie Eleison" – 6:41
9. "Into the Future" – 5:00
10. "So She Wears Black" (Guitar Mix) – 7:20 [Japanese Bonus Track]

== Personnel ==
- Timo Tolkki – guitars
- Gus Monsanto – vocals
- Justin Biggs – bass
- Bruno Agra – drums, orchestral arrangements
- Mike Khalilov – keyboards
- Magdalena Lee – classical vocals
- Produced: Tolkki, Lehtiniemi
- Engineered: Santtu Lehtiniemi
- Mixed by Timo Tolkki
