= The Middle of Nowhere (Circle II Circle album) =

Studio album by Circle II Circle
- Released: August 30, 2005
- Recorded: 2005
- Genre: Heavy metal, progressive metal
- Length: 54:25
- Label: AFM, Locomotive
- Producer: Zachary Stevens, Dan Campbell, Jim Morris

Circle II Circle chronology
| All That Remains EP (2005) | The Middle of Nowhere (2005) | Burden of Truth (2006) |

Professional ratings
Review scores
| Source | Rating |
|---|---|
| AllMusic | 3/5 stars |

The Middle of Nowhere is a 2005 release by American heavy metal band Circle II Circle. It was the band's second studio release, but the first featuring the new band assembled after Stevens fired the original band in 2003. Like the band's first record, it features guest appearances and writing credits for Stevens's former Savatage bandmates, Jon Oliva and Chris Caffery. The Japanese edition of the album features three bonus tracks. One track was a live performance of the title track from the band's previous release, Watching in Silence. The other two tracks were previously released on the All That Remains EP.

== Track listing ==
All songs on this album are within the five-minute song length.

1. "In This Life" (Bernd Aufferman, Stevens) – 5:42
2. "All That Remains" (Oliva, Stevens) – 5:12
3. "Open Season" (Caffery, Stevens) – 5:45
4. "Holding On" (Oliva, Stevens) – 5:45
5. "Cynical Ride" (Caffery, Stevens) – 5:33
6. "Hollow" (Oliva, Stevens) – 5:00
7. "Psycho Motor" (Oliva, Stevens) – 5:15
8. "Faces in the Dark" (Caffery, Stevens) – 5:33
9. "The Middle of Nowhere" (Oliva, Stevens) – 5:35
10. "Lost" (Aufferman, Stevens) – 5:05
11. "Watching in Silence" (Live) – 4:36 (Digipak and Japan bonus track)
12. "Strung Out" (Japan bonus track) – 5:24
13. "Shadows" (Japan bonus track) – 4:50

== Personnel ==
- Zachary Stevens – lead vocals, keyboards
- Evan Christopher – guitars, backing vocals
- Andrew Lee – guitars, backing vocals
- Mitch Stewart – bass, backing vocals
- Tom Drennan – drums, backing vocals

=== Production ===
- Recorded at Morrisound Studios in Tampa Bay, Florida, 2004–2005
- Executive producer: Dan Campbell
- Producer: Zachary Stevens
- Co-produced and engineered by Jim Morris
- Mixed and mastered: Morris / Stevens / Campbell
- Cover concept: Campbell / Stevens
- Design and artwork: Dan Campbell / Thomas Ewerhard
- Management: Dan Campbell / Global Artists Inc.
