= Burden of Truth =

Burden of Truth may refer to:

- Burden of Truth (album), a 2006 album by Circle II Circle
- Burden of Truth (TV series), a 2018 Canadian drama television series
- "Burden of Truth" (Chicago P.D.), a crossover episode of Chicago P.D.
- Karz: The Burden of Truth, a 2002 Indian action-drama film
