= Angels of the Apocalypse =

Studio album by Avalon
- Released: May 16, 2014 (Europe); May 20, 2014 (North America)
- Recorded: 2013–2014
- Genre: Symphonic power metal
- Length: 50:23
- Label: Frontiers Records
- Producer: Timo Tolkki

Avalon chronology
The Land of New Hope (2013)	Angels of the Apocalypse (2014)	Return to Eden (2019)

Angels of the Apocalypse is the second full-length album by Timo Tolkki's Finnish metal opera project Avalon, released on May 16, 2014 in Europe and four days later in North America.

It is the second part of the trilogy created by Tolkki, written as a prequel to the previous album The Land of New Hope.

As with the previous effort, several heavy metal singers were invited to play the characters of the story of the album, with female vocalist Elize Ryd of Amaranthe reprising her role and Floor Jansen (Nightwish, ReVamp) playing the main character. The rest of the cast includes Fabio Lione (Rhapsody of Fire, Angra), David DeFeis (Virgin Steele), Simone Simons (Epica), Caterina Nix (solo Chilean singer who is having her debut album produced by Timo Tolkki) and Zachary Stevens (ex-Savatage, Circle II Circle).

== Background and recording ==
The album started to be composed in August 2013 in Greece, to where Timo travelled to seek inspiration.

In October 2013, Timo Tolkki launched a news website for the project in which he announced the album, which was provisionally titled Avalon II. Tolkki also announced he would be working with former Stratovarius bandmates Tuomo Lassila (drums) and Antti Ikonen (keyboards).

In late January, Tolkki revealed the name of the album and the remaining singers. Timo also announced that there will be a contest for guitar and keyboard players, with the winners getting a chance to perform a solo with him in one of the songs.

Once again, the artwork was created by French artist Stanis W. Decker.

Timo stated he created some songs with a specific singer in mind. The title-track will clock around 10:00. He also described the music of the album as "darker and heavier" than its predecessor, which was necessary due to the "Apocalyptic scenes described in the lyrics".

== Track listing ==
All tracks are written by Timo Tolkki except Garden of Eden, composed by Nicolas Jeudy

No.	Title	Guest Vocalist	Length
1.	"Song for Eden"	Fabio Lione	0:46
2.	"Jerusalem is Falling"	Lione	5:19
3.	"Design the Century"	Floor Jansen	4:25
4.	"Rise of the 4th Reich"	David DeFeis	4:43
5.	"Stargate Atlantis"	Lione	3:51
6.	"The Paradise Lost"	Jansen	4:16
7.	"You'll Bleed Forever"	Jansen	5:45
8.	"Neon Sirens"	Zachary Stevens	4:42
9.	"High Above Me"	Caterina Nix, Elize Ryd, Simone Simons	5:20
10.	"Angels of the Apocalypse"	Jansen, Nix, Ryd, Simons	9:07
11.	"Garden of Eden"	(instrumental)	2:10
Total length:			50:23

== Personnel ==
Instrumentalists

- Timo Tolkki (ex-Stratovarius) — lead and rhythm guitars (Fender), bass, add. keyboards
- Tuomo Lassila (ex-Stratovarius) — drums
- Antti Ikonen (ex-Stratovarius) — keyboards

Vocalists

- David DeFeis (Virgin Steele)
- Floor Jansen (Nightwish, ReVamp)
- Fabio Lione (Rhapsody of Fire, Vision Divine, Angra)
- Caterina Nix (Cati Torrealba)
- Elize Ryd (Amaranthe)
- Simone Simons (Epica)
- Zachary Stevens (ex-Savatage, Circle II Circle)

Additional cast

- Nicolas Jeudy - orchestrations
