= Reign of Darkness =

Studio album by Circle II Circle
- Released: October 16, 2015
- Genres: Heavy metal Progressive metal Power metal
- Length: 46:20
- Label: earMUSIC
- Producer: Christian Wentz

Circle II Circle chronology
Seasons Will Fall (2013)	Reign of Darkness (2015)

Professional ratings
Review scores
Source	Rating
Dangerdog	3.5/5
Dead Rhetoric	8/10
Metal Express Radio	7/10
Metal Hammer (GER)	5/7
Metal1.info	7/10
Metalfan.nl	83/100

Reign of Darkness is the seventh studio album by American heavy metal band Circle II Circle, released on October 16, 2015 via earMUSIC. It was produced by Christian Wentz and features guest vocalists Kristina VanAmburgh and Paul Perry.

== Track listing ==
1. "Over-Underture" – 02:27
2. "Victim of the Night" – 05:18
3. "Untold Dreams" – 04:49
4. "It's All Over" – 03:42
5. "One More Day" – 03:48
6. "Ghost of the Devil" – 03:33
7. "Somewhere" – 04:35
8. "Deep Within" – 04:45
9. "Taken Away" – 04:08
10. "Sinister Love" – 04:00
11. "Solitary Rain" – 05:15

== Personnel ==
- Zachary Stevens – lead vocals
- Paul Michael Stewart – bass, vocals
- Christian Wentz – guitars, vocals
- Bill Hudson – guitars
- Henning Wanner – keyboards
- Marcelo Moreira – drums

=== Guests ===
- Kristina VanAmburgh – vocals
- Paul Perry – vocals

=== Production ===
- Recorded/mixed at Immaculate Production Studios in Oakland, California
- Produced by Christian Wentz
- Mixed by Ron Keeler
- Mastered by James Murphy at Safe House Production
