= Seasons Will Fall =

Seasons will Fall

Studio album by Circle II Circle
- Released: January 25, 2013
- Genres: Heavy metal Progressive metal Power metal
- Length: 67:35
- Label: earMUSIC

Circle II Circle chronology
Consequence of Power (2010)	Seasons will Fall (2013)	Reign of Darkness (2015)

Professional ratings
Review scores
Source	Rating
Dangerdog	3.5/5
Dead Rhetoric	6.5/10
Metalfan.nl	68/100

Seasons Will Fall is the sixth studio album by American heavy metal band Circle II Circle, released on January 25, 2013 via earMUSIC. A music video was released for "Diamond Blade" with footage submitted by fans.

== Track listing ==
1. "Diamond Blade" (Stevens/Stewart/Wentz) - 05:45
2. "Without a Sound" (Craig Blackwell/Stevens/Stewart) - 04:56
3. "Killing Death" (Stevens/Stewart) - 05:20
4. "Epiphany" (Stevens/Stewart) - 09:00
5. "End of Emotion" (Stevens/Stewart/Paul Stewart Jr.) - 05:13
6. "Dreams That Never Die" (Stevens/Stewart) - 07:10
7. "Seasons Will Fall" (Stevens/Stewart) - 05:35
8. "Never Gonna Stop" (Stevens/Stewart) - 04:20
9. "Isolation" (Stevens/Stewart) - 04:21
10. "Sweet Despair" (Stevens/Stewart) - 05:36
11. "Downshot" (Blackwell/Stevens) - 03:58
12. "Only Yesterday" (Stevens/Stewart) - 06:21

== Personnel ==
- Zachary Stevens – lead vocals, keyboards
- Bill Hudson – guitars
- Christian David Wentz – guitars
- Paul Michael Stewart – bass guitar, keyboards
- Adam Sagan – drums
- Henning Wanner – Keyboards

== Production ==
- Craig Blackwell – executive producer
- Engineered by Christian Wentz and Craig Blackwell
- Mixed and mastered by Christian Wentz at Curios Kitty Studios, Oakland, CA
- Ron Keeler – assistant mixing engineer
