= Icon & The Black Roses (album) =

Icon & the Black Roses

Studio album by Icon & The Black Roses
- Released: 15 June 2004
- Recorded: Lisbon, Portugal, Hamburg, Germany, Tenerife, Spain, Berlin, Germany
- Genre: Gothic rock
- Length: 51:38
- Label: Dark-Wings
- Producer: Dirk Schlächter and Charlie Bauerfiend

Icon & The Black Roses chronology
| Icon & the Black Roses (2004) | Thorns (2013) |

Icon & the Black Roses is the debut studio album by Portuguese band Icon & The Black Roses. It was released on 15 June 2004, following a demo released 2001 and an EP released in 2003.

In this early period the band recorded a demo called "4 Winter Songs" which allowed them to secure a deal with Dark-Wings records in 2001. Dark-Wings requested a 5 Track CD to be edited in Germany, so the band spent time in studios in Lisbon, Hamburg and Tenerife recording the debut EP.

Dark-Wings decided later that year to extend the release to a full album. The band flew to Berlin to record the extra material and on 15 June 2004, their self-titled debut album was released by Dark-Wings with distribution by SPV.

== Track listing ==
All music is composed by Icon & the Black Roses.

| No. | Title | Length |
|---|---|---|
| 1. | "Black Rose" | 3:44 |
| 2. | "Endless" | 4:33 |
| 3. | "Crucify You Love" | 5:31 |
| 4. | "Dreams and Silver Tears" | 4:05 |
| 5. | "Angel" | 4:19 |
| 6. | "Remember" | 3:25 |
| 7. | "Sweetest Emptiness of Love" | 4:51 |
| 8. | "Black Cage" | 3:58 |
| 9. | "Who Do You Hurt Now?" | 3:46 |
| 10. | "Running Up That Hill" | 4:34 |
| 11. | "Set Me on Fire" | 3:42 |
| 12. | "Diamond Baby" | 5:05 |
| Total length: | | 51:38 |

== Personnel ==
=== Icon & the Black Roses ===
- Johnny Icon – lead vocals
- Sebastian Noir – guitars
- Sean Rose – bass
- Adam Nox – keyboards
- Mike Thorn – drums

=== Guest ===
- Daniel Zimmerman – drums
