= Classical Variations and Themes =

Studio album by Timo Tolkki
- Released: 1994
- Recorded: July–August 1994
- Studios: Soundtrack Studios, Helsinki
- Genres: Neoclassical metal, power metal
- Length: 36:33
- Label: Goldenworks
- Producer: Timo Tolkki

Timo Tolkki chronology
| Classical Variations and Themes (1994) | Hymn to Life (2002) |

Classical Variations and Themes is the first studio album by former Stratovarius guitarist Timo Tolkki, released in 1994 through Goldenworks Ky (Europe) and Victor Entertainment (Japan); and reissued in 2004 through Irond Records.

== Background ==
The album is primarily instrumental (save for two tracks, "Fire Dance Suite" and "Soldiers Prayer", on which Tolkki sings) and bears similar heavy metal and progressive metal elements from previous Stratovarius albums. "Fire Dance Suite" was first composed for Stratovarius in 1986 and later included in their 1997 compilation album called The Past and Now. Additionally, a music video for the song was released.

Keyboard and drums are performed by Tolkki's then-Stratovarius bandmates Antti Ikonen and Tuomo Lassila, respectively. For a couple of months, the recording sessions for this album ran parallel and in the same studio as Stratovarius' then-upcoming studio album Fourth Dimension, the first with singer Timo Kotipelto. The whole of Stratovarius; Tolkki, Kotipelto, Lassila, Ikonen, and then-bassist Jari Kainulainen; is featured in the 2004 reissue of Classical Variations and Themes, in the bonus track "Solitude."

== Track listing ==
All tracks are written by Timo Tolkki, except where noted.

| No. | Title | Length |
|---|---|---|
| 1. | "Lord of the Rings" | 5:42 |
| 2. | "Fire Dance Suite" | 4:57 |
| 3. | "Guitar Concerto" (Joaquín Rodrigo) | 2:52 |
| 4. | "Northern Lights" | 2:18 |
| 5. | "Capriccio in A Minor" (Niccolò Paganini) | 1:09 |
| 6. | "Back to the Ice Age" | 4:03 |
| 7. | "Death of a Swan" (Pyotr Ilyich Tchaikovsky) | 3:54 |
| 8. | "Soldiers Prayer" | 4:04 |
| 9. | "Flying Samir" | 3:02 |
| 10. | "Sunwinds" | 2:40 |
| 11. | "Greensleeves" (traditional) | 1:52 |
| Total length: | | 36:33 |

South American edition bonus track
| No. | Title | Length |
|---|---|---|
| 12. | "Solitude" (performed by Stratovarius) | 4:47 |

== Personnel ==
- Timo Tolkki – vocals, guitar, guitar synthesizer, bass, engineering, production
- Antti Ikonen – keyboard
- Tuomo Lassila – drums
- Mikko Karmila – mixing
