= Delusions of Grandeur (Circle II Circle album) =

Studio album by Circle II Circle
- Released: August 25, 2008
- Genres: Heavy metal, power metal, progressive metal
- Length: 45:04
- Label: AFM

Circle II Circle chronology
Burden of Truth (2006)	Delusions of Grandeur (2008)	Consequence of Power (2010)

Professional ratings
Review scores
Source	Rating
Dangerdog	4/5
Metalfan.nl	78/100

Delusions of Grandeur is a 2008 release by Circle II Circle. It was the band's fourth studio release.

== Track listing ==
All songs written by Zachary Stevens and Paul Michael Stewart except as indicated below.

1. Fatal Warning - 03:55
2. Dead of Dawn - 04:07
3. Forever - 05:16
4. Echoes - 05:21
5. Waiting - 03:35
6. Soul Breaker (Stevens/Stewart/Christian) - 03:29
7. Seclusion - 05:03
8. So Many Reasons - 03:41
9. Chase the Lies - 03:14
10. Every Last Thing - 07:23
11. Stay - 4:52 (Digipack bonus material)
12. Revelations (live video clip) (Digipack bonus material)

=== Japanese Edition ===
1. Fatal Warning - 03:55
2. Dead of Dawn - 04:07
3. Forever - 05:16
4. Echoes - 05:21
5. Waiting - 03:35
6. Soul Breaker (Stevens/Stewart/Christian) - 03:29
7. Stay - 4:52 (Japanese Bonus)
8. Seclusion - 05:03
9. So Many Reasons - 03:41
10. Chase the Lies - 03:14
11. Every Last Thing - 07:23
12. Against The World - 4:04 (Japanese Bonus)
13. Darkness Rising - 3:33 (Russian bonus track; taken from Every Last Thing EP)

== Personnel ==
- Zachary Stevens – lead vocals
- Andrew Lee – lead guitar
- Evan Christopher – rhythm guitar
- Paul Michael Stewart – bass, backing vocals, keyboards
- Tom Drennan – drums, backing vocals
