= The Land of New Hope =

Studio album by Avalon
- Released: May 17, 2013
- Recorded: 2012–2013
- Genre: Symphonic power metal
- Label: Frontiers Records
- Producer: Timo Tolkki

Avalon chronology
The Land of New Hope (2013)	Angels of the Apocalypse (2014)

The Land of New Hope is the first full-length album by Timo Tolkki's Finnish metal opera project Avalon. The album was released on May 17, 2013 in Europe and May 21, 2013 in the US.

According to Tolkki "I sort of rediscovered myself musically in the process of making this album. I wrote the story first and started composing the music after that. My aim was to write memorable songs with good melodies that would support the story...On this album you will find a lot of different dynamics...with some songs that are fully orchestrated and sound very very big."

Tolkki plans to release a trilogy about this concept, and The Land of New Hope is the end of the story

Several heavy metal singers were invited to play the characters of the story of the album, with female vocalist Elize Ryd (Amaranthe) and vocalist Rob Rock (Impellitteri) appearing to be the main characters and singing on most of the songs. The remaining vocalists performing on the album were Michael Kiske (Unisonic, ex-Helloween), Russell Allen (Symphony X, Allen-Lande), Sharon den Adel (Within Temptation) and Tony Kakko (Sonata Arctica).

The artwork was created by Stanis W. Decker and will be released in 2 versions - regular cd and deluxe edition with a 30-minute documentary plus a promotional videoclip for the song "Enshrined in My Memory".

== Story ==
"It’s A.D. 2055 and most big cities of Planet Earth are either flooded with tsunamis or destroyed by earthquakes and fire. The whole infrastructure and communication system has broken down. The destruction is total. A small group of survivors leaves for a quest to find a sacred place known as The Land of New Hope. It is an old fairytale that has been told since decades, but very few has actually ever believed of its existence. They travel far on a journey that is full of dangers and come across a seer who guides them further. She explains to them that The Land of New Hope does exist, but it is guarded by a Keeper and only those who are pure in heart can pass him. They wander further towards their ultimate destiny…."

== Track listing ==
All tracks are written by Timo Tolkki.

No.	Title	Guest Vocalist	Length
1.	"Avalanche Anthem"	Russell Allen, Rob Rock, Elize Ryd	4:53
2.	"A World Without Us"	Elize Ryd, Russell Allen, Rob Rock	5:43
3.	"Enshrined in My Memory"	Elize Ryd	4:08
4.	"In the Name of the Rose"	Elize Ryd, Russell Allen, Rob Rock	4:29
5.	"We Will Find a Way"	Rob Rock, Tony Kakko	4:25
6.	"Shine"	Elize Ryd, Sharon den Adel	3:37
7.	"The Magic of the Night"	Rob Rock	4:44
8.	"To the Edge of the World"	Rob Rock	5:03
9.	"I’ll Sing You Home"	Elize Ryd	5:03
10.	"The Land of New Hope"	Michael Kiske	8:57

Japanese edition
No.	Title	Guest Vocalist	Length
11.	"I’ll Sing You Home (acoustic orchestral version)"	Elize Ryd	5:03

== Personnel ==
- Timo Tolkki - Guitar, bass, keyboards
- Elize Ryd (Amaranthe) - lead vocals on #01, 02, 03, 04, 06, 09, 11
- Rob Rock (Impellitteri, ex-Axel Rudi Pell) - lead vocals on #01, 02, 04, 05, 07, 08
- Russell Allen (Symphony X) - lead vocals on #01, 02, 04
- Michael Kiske - lead vocals on #10
- Sharon den Adel (Within Temptation) - lead vocals on #06
- Tony Kakko (Sonata Arctica) - lead vocals on #05
- Alex Holzwarth (Rhapsody of Fire) - drums
- Derek Sherinian (ex-Dream Theater, ex-Black Country Communion) - Keyboards, keyboard solo on #08
- Jens Johansson (Stratovarius) - Keyboards, keyboard solo on #08
- Mikko Härkin (ex-Sonata Arctica, ex-Symfonia, Luca Turilli's Rhapsody) - Keyboards

=== Additional musicians ===
- Magdalena Lee - soprano voice
- Kimmo Blom - backing vocals
- Luca Sturniolo - backing vocals
- Sami Boman - orchestrations

== Chart positions ==
Country	Position
Finland	7
Sweden	42
Switzerland	59
Norway	80
Germany	90
