= Thorns (Icon & The Black Roses album) =

Studio album by Icon & The Black Roses
- Released: 29 March 2014
- Recorded: Lisbon, Portugal, London, England, and Alessandria, Italy
- Genre: Gothic metal, Heavy metal
- Length: 49:09
- Producer: Daniel Cardoso

Icon & The Black Roses chronology
Icon & The Black Roses (2004)	Thorns (2014)

Thorns is the second studio album by Portuguese band Icon & The Black Roses. It was released on 29 March 2014, following their reunion in 2011.

In 2011, the band announced their return with a new line up, whilst songs from the first album were featured on the hit video game, Rockband.

In 2013, the band released a lyric video for "Wings of a Dreamer", an advance from Thorns. Thorns was recorded between Lisbon, London and Alessandria, and mixed by Daniel Cardoso.

== Reviews ==
Professional ratings
Review scores
Source	Rating
Horns Up	5/5 stars
Metal Temple	5/5 stars

Icon shows great care with every song, which is what I admire the most in this band, what I call love at first listen. - Horns Up 5/5

I’m charmed by the melodic vocals. Highly recommended! - Metal-Temple.com 5/5

== Track listing ==
All music is composed by Icon & the Black Roses.

No.	Title	Length
1.	"Lost"	5:15
2.	"Innocence"	4:44
3.	"The Painter"	4:24
4.	"Wings of a Dreamer"	5:48
5.	"Moments of Madness"	4:45
6.	"Devil’s Made You"	5:01
7.	"Healing Touch"	5:44
8.	"Sometimes"	4:17
9.	"With or Without You"	4:09
10.	"Silence is Everything"	5:09
Total length:		49:09

== Personnel ==
=== Icon & the Black Roses ===
- Johnny Icon – lead vocals
- Lucien Yorg – guitars
- Sean Rose – bass
- Antonio Agate – keyboards
- Jax Cairn – drums
