= Consequence of Power =

Studio album by Circle II Circle
- Released: September 24, 2010
- Genres: Heavy metal Power metal Progressive metal
- Length: 50:26
- Label: AFM Records

Circle II Circle chronology
Delusions of Grandeur (2008)	Consequence of Power (2010)	Seasons Will Fall (2013)

Professional ratings
Review scores
Source	Rating
Dangerdog	4/5
Dead Rhetoric	8/10
Metalfan.nl	81/100

Consequence of Power is a 2010 release by Circle II Circle. It was the band's fifth studio release.

== Track listing ==
All songs written by Zachary Stevens and Paul Michael Stewart

1. "Whispers In Vain" - 05:24
2. "Consequence Of Power" - 04:23
3. "Out Of Nowhere" - 04:09
4. "Remember" - 05:28
5. "Mirage" - 05:04
6. "Episodes Of Mania" - 05:07
7. "Redemption" - 05:29
8. "Take Back Yesterday" - 05:01
9. "Anathema" - 05:14
10. "Blood Of An Angel" - 05:07

== Personnel ==
- Zachary Stevens – lead vocals
- Andrew Lee – guitars
- Paul Michael Stewart – bass, backing vocals, keyboards
- John Osborn – drums
