= Human Fortress =

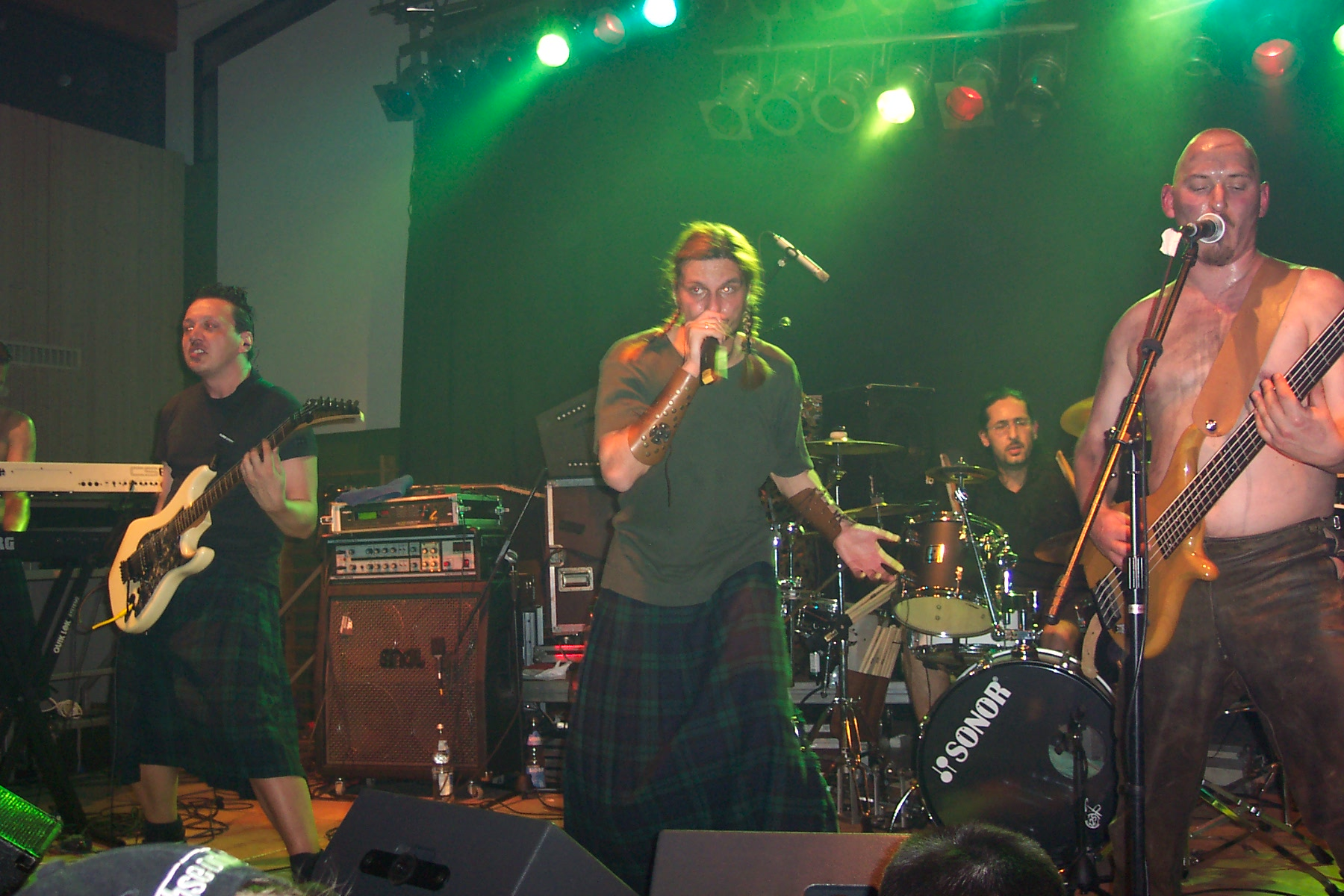
- Human Fortress performing at the Rockhouse in Hanover in 2004

Background information
- Origin: Hanover, Germany
- Genres: Power metal
- Years active: 1997–present
- Label: Massacre Records
- Members: Gus Monsanto; Torsten Wolf; Volker Trost; Apostolos "Laki" Zaios; Andre Hort; Dirk Liehm
- Past members: Jioti Parcharidis; Pablo J. Tammen; Thomas Albrecht; Burkhard Becker; Dirk Marquardt; Frank Sawade; Carsten Frank; Arndt Krone; Vincent Gongala; Ingmar von Berg
- Website: human-fortress.de

Human Fortress is a power metal band from Hanover, Germany. They call their style "epic battle metal."

== Biography ==
=== Early years, Lord of Earth and Heavens Heir, Defenders of the Crown (1997–2007) ===
In 1997, guitarists Torsten Wolf and Volker Trost joined with bassist Pablo J. Tammen to form a band called Timezone. Shortly after recording a demo, however, the band split up. Soon thereafter, the lineup was rounded out with singer Jioti Parcharidis, drummer Apostolos "Laki" Zaios, and keyboardist Dirk Marquardt. This new lineup called themselves Human Fortress.

After recording a demo in 1999, the band began work on their debut album, which was completed in the summer of 2000. They entered a talent contest sponsored by a popular German metal magazine. Their song "The Dragons Lair" was released on a compilation CD for the contest, and was subsequently voted "Favorite Track" by online fans. Due to this recognition the band reached a deal with Limb Records, and released their debut album Lord of Earth and Heavens Heir.

2003 saw the release of the band's second album Defenders of the Crown, this time on Massacre Records. The recording process included guest performances by members of the bands Galloglass, King Leoric, and Meridian Zero. After this album, guitarist Volker Trost left the band and was replaced by Frank Sawade.

=== Change of style, Eternal Empire, hiatus (2007–2013) ===
In 2007, the face of Human Fortress changed once again, as singer Jioti Parcharidis and drummer Apostolos "Laki" Zaios left the band. They were replaced by Carsten Frank and Arndt Krone, respectively. Human Fortress released their third CD, Eternal Empire, on April 25, 2008. Arndt Krone and Torsten Wolf left the band in the same year, the first being replaced by drummer Vincent Gongala.

In 2009 the band announced that Frank Sawade, Pablo J. Tammen, Dirk Marquardt and Vincent Gongala would form a new band called Ember Sea with singer Eva Skamira, continuing the new style adopted for the third album, and that former band members Jioti Parcharidis, Torsten Wolf, Volker Trost and Apostolos "Laki" Zaios, reinforced by newcomers Ingmar von Berg and Dirk Liehm, would continue as Human Fortress in the style of the first two albums. However, the band entered a period of inactivity around this time, and singer Jioti Parcharidis left again due to health problems in the beginning of 2010.

=== Return to activity, AFM Records years (2013–2020) ===
In July 2013, following a 5-year hiatus, Gus Monsanto became Human Fortress' new singer, and the band signed with AFM Records. The band's fourth CD, Raided Land, was released in November of that year. The debut album Lord of Earth and Heavens Heir was also re-released by AFM in 2013.

The band began recording their fifth album in July 2015. A crowdfunding effort was started on Startnext to fund the recording of the album. The album, titled Thieves of the Night, was released in March 2016, again through AFM Records. Soon after, in April of the same year, Defenders of the Crown was re-released by Massacre Records with two bonus tracks re-recorded with original vocalist Jioti Parcharidis.

Reign of Gold, the band's sixth album, was released in December 2019. Reign of Gold was the band's third and final album with AFM Records. Industry veteran Tommy Newton, who had produced the band's early albums, returned in the producer role for Reign of Gold.

=== Later years, return to Massacre Records (2020–) ===
In 2020, Human Fortress announced that they had returned to Massacre Records. A two-disc compilation entitled Epic Tales & Untold Stories was released in January 2021, consisting of new tracks, popular songs from all eras of the band, re-recordings, and demo material.

== Band members ==
=== Current members ===
- Gus Monsanto – vocals (2013–present)
- Torsten Wolf – guitar, backing vocals (1997–2008, 2009–present)
- Volker Trost – guitar (1997–2003, 2009–present)
- Andre Hort – bass (2013–present)
- Apostolos "Laki" Zaios – drums (2000–2007, 2009–present)
- Dirk Liehm – keyboards (2009–present)

=== Former members ===
- Jioti Parcharidis – vocals (1997–2007, 2009–2010)
- Pablo J. Tammen – bass, backing vocals (1997–2009)
- Thomas Albrecht – drums (1997–2000)
- Dirk Marquardt – keyboards, backing vocals (1999–2009)
- Frank Sawade – guitar (2003–2009)
- Carsten Frank – vocals, guitar (2007–2009)
- Arndt Krone – drums (2007–2008)
- Vincent Gongala – drums (2008–2009)
- Ingmar von Berg – bass (2009–2012)

== Discography ==
Date	Album title	Record label	Notes
2000	Human Fortress	Self Released	Ep
2001	Lord of Earth and Heavens Heir	LMP Records	Studio Album
2003	Defenders of the Crown	Massacre Records	Studio Album
2008	Eternal Empire	Massacre Records	Studio Album
2013	Raided Land	AFM Records	Studio Album
2016	Thieves of the Night	AFM Records	Studio Album
2019	Reign of Gold	AFM Records	Studio Album
2020	Epic Tales & Untold Stories	Massacre Records	Studio Album
