= In Paradisum (album) =

Studio album by Symfonia
- Released: March 25, 2011
- Recorded: December 2010 – February 2011
- Genre: Symphonic power metal
- Label: Avalon/Marquee
- Producer: Timo Tolkki

Professional ratings
Review scores
Source	Rating
Thrash Hits	4.5/6 stars

In Paradisum is the debut and only album by multinational power metal band Symfonia, released on March 25, 2011, in Japan and April 1, 2011, in Europe. In paradisum (English: "Into paradise") is an antiphon from the traditional Latin liturgy of the Roman Catholic Requiem Mass.

The album was written by vocalist Andre Matos and guitarist Timo Tolkki, with the former focusing on lyrics and the latter focusing on the music, and both having some input on each other's parts.

The drums were recorded in two days by Uli Kusch in a separate studio, with the guitars, bass and keyboards recorded in Helsinki. Work on vocals started on the first day of 2011 in a cabin on top of a mountain, where Matos and Tolkki remained isolated with no internet or telephone.

Regarding the music of the album, Matos said:

[...] one thing that I always said on interviews [...], was the following: 'Symfonia is not supposed to be a band or a project that was meant to reinvent the style [...]. What we wanted was to get all those famous musicians together who somehow had their highlights in this specific musical field and see what comes out of it. See when those people are together, and if they deliver their best, what kind of power metal comes out of it.' So this was the proposal of the album, and we never denied it. So if someone came with some criticism like, 'But it's more of the same, and it brings nothing new. It just sounds like Stratovarius and Angra.' Well, that's exactly what we wanted.

In Paradisum was mixed in Italy.

== Track listing ==
All songs written by Timo Tolkki and Andre Matos.

1. "Fields of Avalon" (5:09)
2. "Come by the Hills" (5:01)
3. "Santiago" (5:54)
4. "Alayna" (6:17)
5. "Forevermore" (5:31)
6. "Pilgrim Road" (3:37)
7. "In Paradisum" (9:35)
8. "Rhapsody in Black" (4:34)
9. "I Walk in Neon" (5:44)
10. "Don't Let Me Go" (3:56)
11. "I'll Find My Way Home" (4:44) (Japanese bonus track)

== Personnel ==
- Andre Matos – vocals
- Timo Tolkki – guitars, production, mixing
- Jari Kainulainen – bass
- Mikko Härkin – keyboards
- Uli Kusch – drums
- Giovanni Nebbia – mixing, editing, engineer – mix engineer on "I'll Find My Way Home"
- Maor Appelbaum – mastering engineer
