= Watching in Silence =

Studio album by Circle II Circle
- Released: April 29, 2003
- Recorded: 2002–2003
- Studio: Morrisound Studios, Tampa, Florida
- Genre: Heavy metal, progressive metal
- Length: 45:52
- Label: AFM (Germany); Avalon (Japan)
- Producer: Jon Oliva, Zachary Stevens, Jim Morris, Dan Campbell

Circle II Circle chronology
Watching in Silence (2003)	All That Remains EP (2005)

Professional ratings
Review scores
Source	Rating
AllMusic	3/5 stars
Metal Hammer (GER)	6/7
Rock Hard	8.5/10

Watching in Silence is the debut studio album by the American heavy metal band Circle II Circle, released in 2003. It featured guest appearances from lead vocalist Zachary Stevens's former bandmates from Savatage, Jon Oliva and Chris Caffery, who co-wrote most of the songs on the album.

== Track listing ==
1. "Out of Reach" (Chris Caffery, Jon Oliva, Zachary Stevens) – 4:09
2. "Sea of White" (Caffery, Stevens) – 4:39
3. "Into the Wind" (Caffery, Matt LaPorte, Stevens) – 4:18
4. "Watching in Silence" (Oliva, Stevens) – 4:25
5. "Forgiven" (Oliva, Stevens) – 5:02
6. "Lies" (LaPorte, Oliva, Stevens) – 3:26
7. "Face to Face" (Caffery, Stevens) – 5:12
8. "Walls" (Oliva, Stevens) – 4:28
9. "The Circle" (Oliva, Stevens) – 3:30
10. "F.O.S. (Fields of Sorrow)" (Oliva, Stevens) – 6:39

== Personnel ==
Circle II Circle

- Zachary Stevens – lead vocals, producer, cover concept
- Matt LaPorte – guitars
- John Zahner – keyboards
- Kevin Rothney – bass guitar, backing vocals
- Christopher Kinder – drums

Additional musicians

- Jon Oliva – vocals, keyboards, producer
- Chris Caffery – guitars on "Out of Reach", "Sea of White" and "Face to Face"

Production

- Jim Morris – co–producer, engineer, mixing with Circle II Circle, mastering
- Dan Campbell – executive producer, cover concept, design & artwork, management
- Thomas Ewerhard – design & artwork
