= Burden of Truth (album) =

Studio album by Circle II Circle
- Released: October 10, 2006 (Locomotive Records); October 13, 2006 (AFM Records)
- Recorded: 2006
- Studios: Morrisound Studios, Tampa, FL
- Genres: Heavy metal Progressive metal
- Length: 49:51
- Labels: AFM Records; Locomotive Records
- Producers: Zachary Stevens; Dan Campbell; Jim Morris

Circle II Circle chronology
The Middle of Nowhere (2006)	Burden of Truth (2006)	Delusions of Grandeur (2008)

Professional ratings
Review scores
Source	Rating
Allmusic	3/5 stars

Burden of Truth is a 2006 release by Circle II Circle. It was the band's third full-length studio release so far, and is a concept album, with the songs telling a story based on The Da Vinci Code. Unlike the band's first two albums, this album does not feature a guest appearance from lead vocalist Zak Stevens's former Savatage bandmates, Chris Caffery and Jon Oliva.

== Track listing ==
1. "Who Am I to Be?" (Stevens, Stewart, Lee) - 5:03
2. "A Matter of Time" (Stevens, Stewart) - 4:08
3. "Heal You" (Stevens, Stewart, Lee) - 4:16
4. "Revelations" (Stevens, Stewart) - 3:41
5. "Your Reality" (Stevens, Stewart) - 4:29
6. "Evermore" (Stevens, Stewart) - 2:53
7. "The Black" (Stevens, Stewart, Lee) - 4:55
8. "Messiah" (Stevens, Stewart) - 3:31
9. "Sentenced" (Stevens, Stewart, Lee) - 4:58
10. "Burden of Truth" (Stevens, Stewart) - 6:44
11. "Live as One" (Stevens, Stewart) - 5:05

== Personnel ==
- Zak Stevens – lead vocals
- Paul Michael "Mitch" Stewart – bass guitar, keyboards, guitars, backing vocals
- Andrew Lee – guitars, backing vocals
- Tom Drennan – drums, backing vocals
- Evan Christopher – guitars, backing vocals

=== Further credits ===
- Recorded @ Morrisound Studios in Tampa, Florida, 2005–2006
- Executive Producer: Dan Campbell
- Producer: Zak Stevens
- Co-produced and engineered by Jim Morris
- Mixed and Mastered: Morris / Stevens / Campbell
- Story Concept: Campbell / Stevens
- Cover Concept: Campbell / Stevens
- Design and Artwork : Dan Campbell / Thomas Ewerhard
- Management : Dan Campbell / Global Artists Inc.
