= Icon & The Black Roses =

Portuguese band

- Origin: Portugal
- Genres: Gothic rock (early), gothic metal, alternative metal, heavy metal
- Years active: 1999–2004, 2011-present
- Members: Johnny Icon; Lucien Yorg; Sean Rose; Jax Cairn; Antonio Agate
- Past members: David Silva; Luís Ramos; Ana Miranda; Mike Thorn; Sebastian Noir; Adam Nox

Icon & The Black Roses is a Portuguese gothic metal band.

== Career ==
Icon & The Black Roses was once named Delightful Solitude, Silent Cry.

Icon and The Black Roses started in 1999 under the name of Blue Obsession. In this early period the band recorded a demo called “4 Winter Songs” which allowed them to secure a deal with German record label Dark-Wings records in 2001. Dark-Wings requested a 5 Track CD to be edited in Germany, so the band spent time in studios in Lisbon, Hamburg and Tenerife recording the debut EP. The drums on the EP were performed by Daniel Zimmerman and produced by Gamma Ray's Dirk Schlächter. The final mix was handled by Charlie Bauerfiend (Blind Guardian, Hammerfall, etc.).

Dark-Wings decided later that year to extend the release to a full album. The band flew to Berlin to record the extra material and on June 15, 2004, their self-titled debut album was released by Dark-Wings with distribution by SPV. The album went down very well with the listeners and the press, with Icon winning the award for the best new act for LOUD's readers. Reviews averaged at 8 out of 10 whilst Icon was being played on radio stations worldwide, charting on a number of European stations.

Following the initial success the band split for personal reasons. In 2011 the band announced their return with a new line up whilst songs from the first album were featured on the hit computer game Rockband (Xbox/PS/Wii).

In 2013 the band released a lyric video for Wings of a Dreamer, an advance from their latest album “Thorns”. Thorns has been recorded between Lisbon, London and Alessandria and mixed by Daniel Cardoso. The album is available as a free (mp3) download from this website. Thorns still has similar colors to that of their previous release from 2004 but adds a new sound to the band which is heavier and more energetic.

On February 22, 2021, vocalist Johnny Icon released a re-tracking version of their 2004 track "Black Rose" on his YouTube channel.

In March 18, rumors on the Russian social media website VK showing photos including the band's logo above the title "Midnight Bless" suggesting a new album was on the way.

Gothic Love Metal Music archived: "Just a month ago Johnny Icon posted on his Facebook profile that he had just finished recording a demo of a new ICON song called Forbidden Love. J also clarified that the song is in the spirit of the first album. And this means that the third album ICON & the Black Roses will be!

Small update: for this period of time an EP with 3 new tracks is planned. The album is expected later, possibly by 2022 or 2023"

Their music is available as a free download at their official website.

On November 16th, 2025, the band released the Numinous EP, containing four new songs.

== Members ==
- Johnny Icon - vocals, guitar (1999 — 2005, 2011–present)
- Sean Rose - bass guitar (2000 — 2005, 2011–present)
- Lucien Yorg - guitar (2011–present)
- Jax Cairn - drums (2011–present)
- Antonio Agate - keyboards (2011–present)

=== Former members ===
- David Silva - drums (1999–2000)
- Luís Ramos - keyboards (1999–2002)
- Ana Miranda - backvocals (1999–2001)
- Mike Thorn - drums (2000–2005)
- Sebastian Noir - guitar (2000–2005)
- Adam Nox - keyboards (2002–2005)

== Discography ==
- 4 Winter Songs (Demo) (2001)
- Lágrima (EP) (2003)
- Icon & the Black Roses (2004)
- Thorns (2013)
- Numinous (EP) (2025)
- Untitled third studio album (TBA)
