= Gus Monsanto =

Brazilian singer

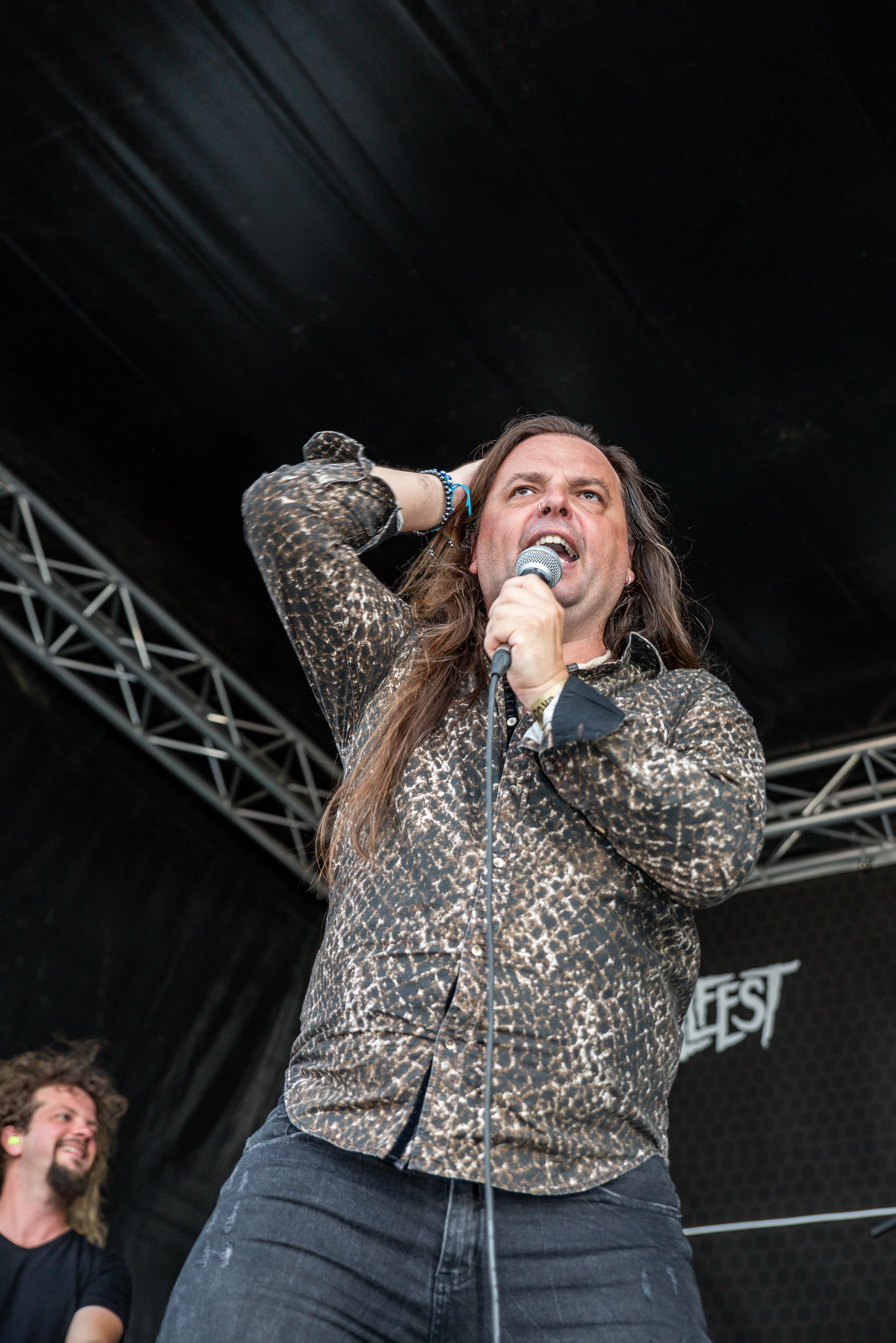

Background information
- Born: Gustavo Monsanto; 5 November 1974 (age 51); Rio de Janeiro, Brazil
- Genres: Progressive rock, progressive metal, symphonic metal, power metal
- Occupation: Singer
- Years active: 1991–present
- Label: AFM,
- Website: gusmonsanto.com

Gustavo Monsanto (born 5 November 1974) is a Brazilian singer who is the former lead vocalist of the French progressive metal band Adagio, and former lead singer of Finnish band Revolution Renaissance formed by Timo Tolkki after he left Stratovarius. He is the brother of journalist Eduardo Monsanto of ESPN Brazil.

In 2009, he released an album as frontman of the band The Lightseekers.

Monsanto is lead vocalist for the German metal band Human Fortress and appeared on their albums Raided Land and Reign of Gold. He released his first solo debut album called Karma Café in 2016.

In 2022, Gus joined French heavy metal band Krysaor.

== Discography ==
Date	Artist	Album title	Notes
1995	Angel Heart	Welcome	Lead Vocals
2004	Astra	Astra	Lead Vocals
2005	Adagio	Dominate	Lead Vocals
2007	Dr.Sin	Bravo	Guest Vocals
2007	Zyon Vega	Trinity_ (unreleased)	Lead Vocals
2008	Stéphane Cavanez	Collectif Tribute	Guest Vocals
2008	Venturia	Hybrid	Guest Vocals/Backing Vocals
2008	Skyrion	Beyond Creation	Producer/Backing Vocals
2008	Revolution Renaissance	Untitled Demo	Lead Vocals
2008	Takara	Invitation To Forever	Lead Vocals
2009	Adagio	Archangels in Black	Backing Vocals
2009	The Lightseekers	Flying Free	Lead Vocals
2009	Revolution Renaissance	Age Of Aquarius	Lead Vocals
2009	Thunderstone	Dirt Metal	Backing Vocals
2010	Revolution Renaissance	Trinity	Lead Vocals
2010	Ferreira	Better Run !!!	Guest Vocals
2010	Julien Damotte	Trapped	Guest Vocals
2010	Jade Lizard	Puppet Master (unreleased)	Lead Vocals
2010	Kim's Over silence	Carpe Diem	Guest Vocals
2010	Painside	Dark World Burden	Guest Vocals
2010	Pleaides	Pleaides	Producer
2011	Gunpoint (unreleased)	At Gunpoint	Lead Vocals
2011	Seliger (unreleased)	Out of the Dark	Lead Vocals
2011	Ferreira	Are You In ?	Guest Appearance
2012	Aria Inferno	The Absinthe Episodes	Lead Vocals
2012	Lord Of Mushrooms	Perspectives	Lead Vocals
2012	Symbolica	Precession	Lead Vocals
2012	Tray Of Gift	The Tray Of Gift	Guest Vocals
2013	Human Fortress	Raided Land	Lead Vocals
2013	Aneurose	From Hell	Lead Vocals
2013	Code Of Silence	Dark Skies Over Babylon	Lead Vocals
2014	Marmor	Alma Celta	Guest Vocals
2014	Jesus Christ Superstar (unreleased)	Hits From Rio Cast Recording	Guest Vocals
2014	Refurbished	Only Want The Best	Guest Vocals
2014	Exxiles	Oblivion	Guest Vocals
2015	Galwem	Joaquim e o Barril de Carvalho	Producer
2015	Skyeart	Freedom (Between Being and Nothingness)	Lead Vocals
2015	Sons Of Haze	Skirmish	Guest Vocals/Producer
2015	Roots Of Hate	Inside The Purgatory	Producer
2015	Alex Martinho	Ao Vivo Na Toca Do Bandido	Guest Vocals
2016	Motorgun	Motorgun	Writer
2016	Stereo Scream (unreleased)	Stereo Scream	Lead Vocals
2016	Human Fortress	Thieves of the Night	Lead Vocals
2016	Gus Monsanto	Karma Café	Lead Vocals, producer
2016	Grand Media Blackout	Grand Media Blackout	Lead Vocals
2017	Omega Blast	Omega Blast	Guest Appearance
2017	Criminal Brain	Killing Joke	Producer
2017	Burnt City	Resurgence	Lead Vocals
2017	Edu Falaschi	A New Lease Of Life: 25th Anniversary Tribute Vol. II	Guest Vocals
2017	Sicke	The Room	Producer/Guitars
2017	Indiscipline	Sanguinea	Producer
2017	Rec/All	Rec/All	Guest Vocals
2017	The Yell	Recovery	Lead Vocals, guitars, producer
2017	1Dia Pro Fim	1Dia Pro Fim	Producer
2017	Fall Of Silence	Act 1	Writer
2017	Exos	Time for a Change	Guest Vocals
2018	Pleasure Maker	Dancin' With Danger	Guest Vocals
2018	Fleesh	Versions I	Guest Vocals
2018	Supremacy	Sirius (Single)	Lead Vocals
2019	Guilherme Costa	Light Of Revelations	Guest Vocals
2019	Human Fortress	Reign Of Gold	Lead Vocals
2020	Marius Danielsen and Friends	We Are The World (Single)	Guest Vocals
2020	Ferreira	Come And Get It	Guest Vocals
2020	Walter Monsanto	Perfect Balance	Guest Vocals
2021	Human Fortress	Epic Tales & Untold Stories	Lead Vocals
2021	Fleesh	Versions II	Guest Vocals
2022	Eden Myrrh	Lost Anthology	Lead Vocals
2022	Jari Behm	Mind Adventures	Guest Vocals
2023	Supremacy	Influence	Lead Vocals
2023	Krysaor	Foreword	Lead Vocals
2023	Urantia	Eos	Backing Vocals
2024	Innocence Lost	Oblivion	Backing Vocals
2024	Eddie LaValle's Jokers & Kings	Closer To The Fire	Lead Vocals
2024	Gus Monsanto	Dandelions	Lead Vocals
2025	First Fear	Resilient	Guest Vocals
2025	SoundScars	My Scars	Guest Vocals
2025	Human Fortress	Stronghold	Lead Vocals
2026	Hall of Gods	Auri Sacra Fames	Lead Vocals
2026	Goodbye Thrill	Longplay	Guest Vocals/Backing Vocals
