= Timo Tolkki =

Finnish musician (born 1966)

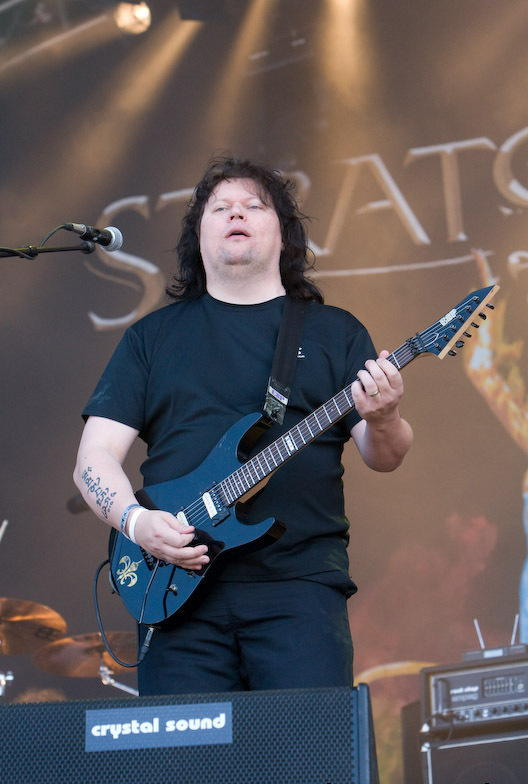
- Tolkki performing with Stratovarius in 2007

Background information
- Born: Timo Tapio Tolkki; 3 March 1966 (age 60); Klaukkala, Nurmijärvi, Finland
- Genres: Power metal; symphonic metal; neoclassical metal; heavy metal
- Occupations: Musician; songwriter; producer
- Instruments: Guitar; vocals
- Years active: 1984–present
- Labels: Nuclear Blast; Sanctuary
- Website: timotolkki.net

Timo Tapio Tolkki (born 3 March 1966) is a Finnish musician best known as the former guitarist, singer, songwriter and producer of the power metal band Stratovarius. With his tenure lasting for more than twenty years, he was the longest standing member of the band before his departure in 2008. After leaving Stratovarius he formed two supergroups named Revolution Renaissance and Symfonia, both of which have since disbanded. In a 2011 article by Guitar World magazine, Tolkki was included in the all-time top 50 list of the world's fastest guitarists. He was also listed as the 84th greatest heavy metal guitarist of all time by the same publication in 2004.

== Early years and Stratovarius ==
Tolkki started playing guitar at the age of seven and practiced intensely, sometimes eight hours a day. When he was twelve years old, his father committed suicide by jumping from the fourth floor of his apartment.

Before joining Stratovarius in 1984, Tolkki had played with the bands Antidote, Thunder and Road Block. At the beginning of his career with Stratovarius, he served as vocalist as well as handling all lead and rhythm guitars, and at times bass guitar (until Jari Kainulainen's arrival in 1993). After the band's third album, Dreamspace (1994), Tolkki handed over vocal duties to Timo Kotipelto, who took over from Fourth Dimension (1995) onwards. This was largely due to Tolkki's desire to evolve the overall musical direction of the band and concentrate on his guitar work. Further changes were made after Dreamspace, including the departure of the remaining original members of the band, keyboardist Antti Ikonen and drummer Tuomo Lassila, due to creative differences.

In 1994, Tolkki released his first solo album, Classical Variations and Themes, which had at the time been one of his longtime ambitions. The album was similar to his work with Stratovarius, but with more focus on primarily instrumental compositions. His second solo album, Hymn to Life (2002) showed a more personal side, dealing with such emotional issues as his relationship with God and his late father.

He was diagnosed with bipolar disorder in 2004, following a nervous breakdown which occurred some months after Stratovarius acrimoniously disbanded. After a period of rehabilitation, he went on to make a full recovery later that year and subsequently opened his own recording studio named Goldenworks. A final self-titled album with Stratovarius was released in 2005, after which he announced his departure from the band in 2008. Upon leaving he decided to waive the legal rights to the name. He later claimed this was done as a protest due to the remaining members deciding to continue the band as Stratovarius.

== Solo projects ==
=== Revolution Renaissance ===
Tolkki's next project was an album described as a rock opera, named Saana – Warrior of Light Pt 1. Released on 14 March 2008, it featured a number of guest vocalists, including soprano Jennifer Sowle in the lead role, as well as Heikki Pöyhiä of Twilightning. Also in 2008, he founded a band called Revolution Renaissance, which released three albums between 2008 and 2010.

=== Symfonia ===
In 2010, Symfonia was formed as a power metal supergroup comprising Tolkki, singer André Matos, keyboardist Mikko Härkin, drummer Uli Kusch and former Stratovarius bandmate Jari Kainulainen. They made their debut performance at the 2011 Finnish Metal Expo and later released their only studio album, In Paradisum, but in December of that year Tolkki announced the discontinuation of the band, and subsequently his retirement from the music industry.

In March 2012, Tolkki stated on his Facebook profile (and official Symfonia page) that although he had left the music business, he hadn't given up on music altogether: "With all the tools available for us today to release music, you will hear something interesting from me". Later he released a mock album cover entitled Classical Variations and Themes Vol 2, suggesting a new solo album. On 10 April 2012 he released a new instrumental track named "Dinner with Paganini", which was made available as a free download through PledgeMusic, as well as a revised name for a potential new album, Classical Variations and Themes II: Credo. However, on 26 July, he announced the cancellation of the project.

=== Avalon Metal Opera ===
On 8 January 2013, Tolkki announced the opening of a new mixing and mastering studio named Studiotolkki, located in Helsinki, Finland.

In February 2013, Timo announced his new project, Avalon, featuring a group of guest musicians such as Michael Kiske (Unisonic, Helloween), Sharon den Adel (Within Temptation), Elize Ryd (Amaranthe), Russell Allen (Symphony X, Adrenaline Mob, Star One), Rob Rock (Impellitteri, M.A.R.S.), Tony Kakko (Sonata Arctica), Jens Johansson (Stratovarius, Yngwie Malmsteen), Derek Sherinian (Dream Theater) and Alex Holzwarth (Rhapsody of Fire). The album, released on 17 May 2013, follows a story set in a post-apocalyptic future. In 2055, Earth has been almost destroyed by natural catastrophes, and a small group of survivors decide to set off a journey to find a sacred place known as The Land of New Hope.

In October 2013 Timo launched a news website for the project in which he announced the sequel to The Land of New Hope, which was provisionally titled Avalon II. The cast of guest musicians will be revealed one by one. Simone Simons of Epica fame is the first confirmed singer. Floor Jansen will play the leading role. It was also announced that Timo's former bandmates in Stratovarius, drummer Tuomo Lassila and keyboardist Antti Ikonen will play on this album.

A European tour was planned for May 2014, coinciding with the release of the album.

On 28 January, Timo revealed title of the album (Angels of the Apocalypse) and the rest of the cast: Fabio Lione (Rhapsody of Fire, Angra), David DeFeis (Virgin Steele), Elize Ryd (Amaranthe) and Caterina Nix. Timo also announced that there will be a contest for guitar and keyboard players, with the winners getting a chance to perform a solo with him in one of the songs.

In June 2019, Timo Tolkki released the third part of the Avalon trilogy, the album Return to Eden, with the main working song, "Promises".

In 2021, Timo Tolkki releases his new solo album with "Infinite Visions" project's songs, called "Union Magnetica", as the fourth Avalon album, which is called "The Enigma Birth", with many musicians as guests. The new metal opera album has the main working songs "Master of Hell" and "The Fire and the Sinner".

=== Allen/Lande ===
On 24 July 2013, Tolkki announced via his Facebook page (among a statement regarding Stratovarius) that he would be the producer, mixer and songwriter for a new album of the duo Allen/Lande, composed of Symphony X vocalist Russell Allen and Norwegian singer Jørn Lande. The album The Great Divide was released on 17 October in Europe and 21 October 2014 in North America.

=== Chaos Magic ===
In May 2015, it was announced that Timo would produce and perform in a project with Chilean singer Caterina Nix titled Chaos Magic. Caterina and Timo met in Chile when Stratovarius was performing there. She would later guest sing in Avalon's second album, Angels of the Apocalypse. Their first, self-titled album is set for a 3 July release in Europe. In June 2015 they released their first videos: a video for the song "I'm Alive", and two lyric videos for "One Drop of Blood" and "A Little Too Late".

== Playing style ==
From the period spanning Stratovarius' first three albums, Tolkki's guitar playing was more progressive and heavy. During this time he preferred E♭ tuning, with his compositions often bearing a dark and unnerving tonal quality (particularly on Dreamspace). Following Timo Kotipelto's arrival as lead singer, Tolkki's style shifted gradually more towards the traditionally speedy and melodic format of power metal, with an emphasis on such elements as neoclassical phrasing and fast alternate picking.

== Personal life ==
Tolkki has been married three times. He has one daughter from his second marriage, born in 1988. Since 2000, Tolkki has been in a relationship with Dominika Gottová, eldest daughter of Czech singer Karel Gott. They got married in 2010. Gottová filed for divorce in December 2019, but the proceedings were halted in November 2020 after the couple decided to reconcile.

In November 2023, Tolkki was convicted by the Helsinki District Court for fraudulently claiming income support in 2020. He received a 45-day suspended prison sentence and was ordered to pay €3,063 to Kela.

== Discography ==
=== Stratovarius ===
==== As singer and guitarist ====
- 1989: Fright Night
- 1992: Twilight Time (Stratovarius II)
- 1994: Dreamspace

==== As guitarist ====
- 1995: Fourth Dimension
- 1996: Episode
- 1997: Visions
- 1998: Destiny
- 1999: The Chosen Ones
- 2000: Infinite
- 2001: Intermission
- 2003: Elements Pt. 1
- 2003: Elements Pt. 2
- 2005: Stratovarius
- 2006: Black Diamond: The Anthology

=== Solo albums ===
- 1994: Classical Variations and Themes
- 2002: Hymn to Life
- 2008: Saana – Warrior of Light Pt 1
- 2022: We Are The Revolution - Single
- 2023: Renaissance Acoustica
- 2024: Classical Variations and Themes II: Ultima Thule

=== Revolution Renaissance ===
- 2008: New Era
- 2009: Age of Aquarius
- 2010: Trinity

=== Symfonia ===
- 2011: In Paradisum

=== Timo Tolkki's Avalon ===
- 2013: The Land of New Hope
- 2014: Angels of the Apocalypse
- 2019: Return to Eden
- 2021: The Enigma Birth

=== Allen/Lande ===
- 2014: The Great Divide

=== Chaos Magic (Caterina Nix feat. Timo Tolkki) ===
- 2015: Chaos Magic

=== Other appearances ===
- 1998: Edguy – Vain Glory Opera (guitar solo on "Out of Control")
- 2001: Avantasia – The Metal Opera (vocals on "The Tower")
- 2002: Avantasia – The Metal Opera Part II (guitar solo on "The Seven Angels" and "Into the Unknown")
- 2002: Thunderstone – Thunderstone (guitar solo on "Like Father, Like Son")
- 2003: Gimmel – Kaksi kertaa enemmän
- 2010: Beto Vázquez Infinity – Existence (guitar solo on "Existence")
- 2013: Dreamtale – World Changed Forever (guitar solo on "The End of Our Days")
- 2014: Ring of Fire – Battle of Leningrad
- 2024: Ërendil – Songs of Ancient Magic

== Books ==
- 2010: Loneliness of a Thousand Years
- 2012: Golden Handbook of Recording Heavy Metal Music
- 2020: Hymni elämälle – Stratovarius-kitaristin tarina ("Hymn to Life – The Story of a Stratovarius Guitarist")
- 2020: Golden Handbook of Recording Heavy Metal Music – Update
