= Zachary Stevens =

American singer (born 1966)

Zak Stevens
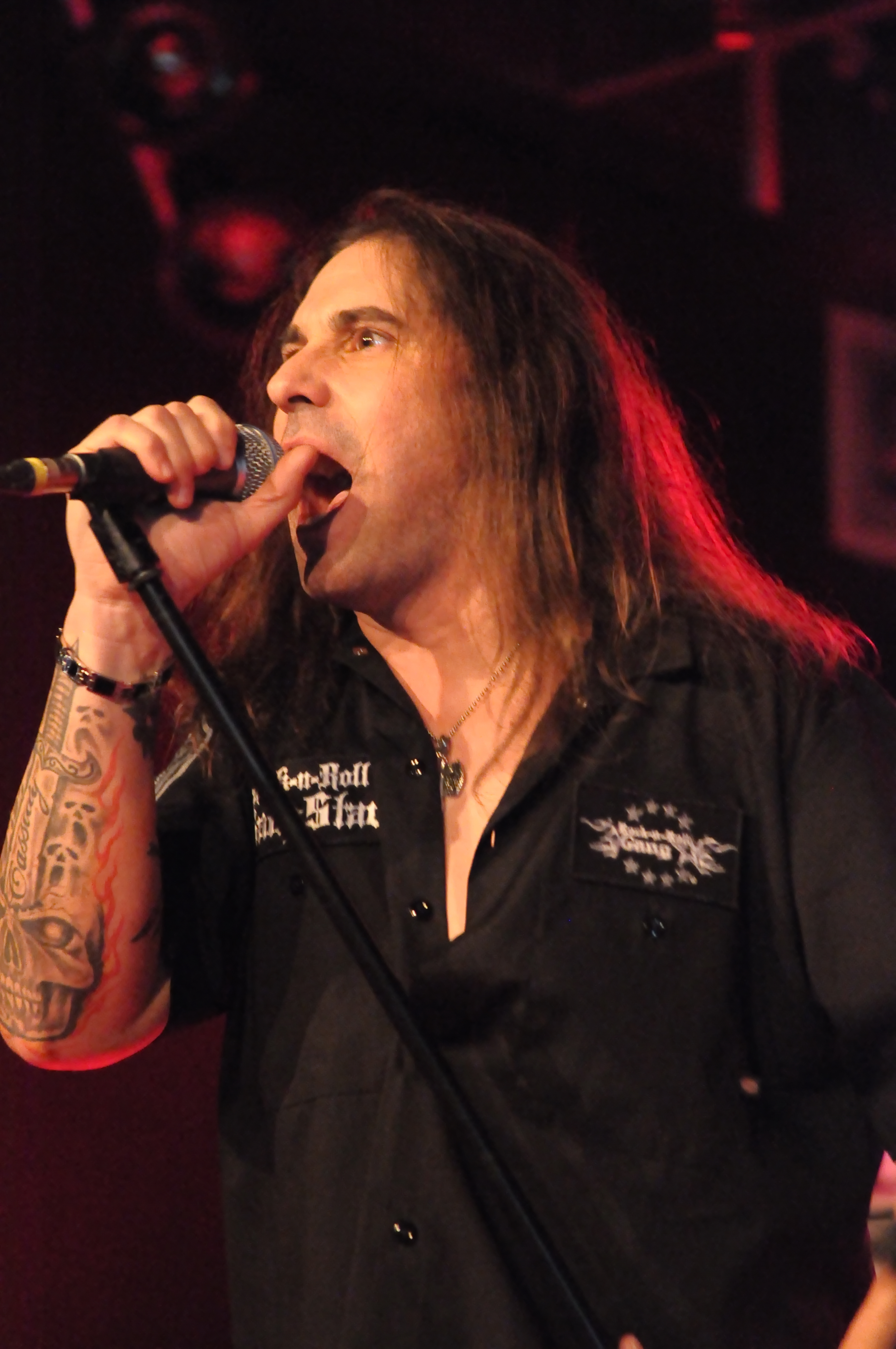
- Stevens performing in 2014

Background information
- Born: Zachary Trussell; March 5, 1966 (age 60); Columbia, South Carolina , U.S.
- Genres: Heavy metal, progressive metal, hard rock
- Occupation: Singer

Zachary Trussell (born March 5, 1966), known professionally as Zachary "Zak" Stevens, is an American singer, best known as the second lead vocalist of the heavy metal band Savatage. He currently performs with the bands Savatage, Archon Angel and TSO. Stevens has a degree in psychology, but is not a practicing psychologist.

== Career ==
Stevens first achieved fame singing for a band called Wicked Witch. However, after Savatage co-founder Jon Oliva stepped down from the fore of the band at the conclusion of their tour in support of Streets: A Rock Opera in 1992 to concentrate on other projects, namely his other band Doctor Butcher and a Broadway-bound musical entitled Romanov, Savatage required a replacement. Oliva hand-picked his replacement, who was discovered and introduced to the band by Criss Oliva's best friend and guitar technician Savatage's lead guitarist, and their long-time producer Paul O'Neill heard demos of Stevens and wanted him to sing for the band. After an initial audition, Stevens was considered to be the right man for the job and joined Savatage in 1993. He first appeared on the album Edge of Thorns. Stevens's vocals were considered to be a departure from that of Jon Oliva, and some Savatage fans prefer to distinguish between the Jon Oliva lead albums and those with Stevens on lead vocals. The album Dead Winter Dead contains lead vocals from both Oliva and Stevens and contains the song "Christmas Eve (Sarajevo 12/24)", which gave rise to and became a hit for the Trans-Siberian Orchestra. In 1996, Stevens appeared along with other Savatage members in the Trans-Siberian Orchestra project. His last album recorded with Savatage was The Wake of Magellan (1997), which some fans consider to be Savatage's best work in the post-1993 Savatage canon.

In 2000, Stevens quit Savatage, citing that he wanted to spend more time with his young family. During the winter of 2001, Zak started his comeback. His Savatage connections remained evident, as Jon Oliva produced the first Circle II Circle album, Watching in Silence, and guitarist Chris Caffery recorded guitar on some songs. Oliva and Caffery also co-wrote several of the songs on Watching in Silence. In 2003, Stevens's band left Circle II Circle to join Jon Oliva's band Pain. Stevens then hired an all-new band. Circle II Circle has released three additional full-length albums since, 2005's The Middle of Nowhere, Burden of Truth in 2006, and Delusions of Grandeur in 2008. In April 2014 "Ancient Rites of the Moon", the first album of the Stardust Reverie Project (Graham Bonnet, Lynn Meredith, Bill Hudson and Melissa Ferlaak), was released. "Mighty Roar" becomes one of Stevens' most impressive songs to date.

During several gigs with Circle II Circle, not only were certain Savatage songs played but also entire albums featuring Stevens, among them The Wake of Magellan and Edge of Thorns. On July 30, 2015, Savatage reunited to perform at the first ever two-stage show at Wacken Open Air festival, and Stevens would perform with Savatage as well as Trans-Siberian Orchestra. After this, he was invited to sing with TSO on stage for their Winter 2015 tour. In November 2015, Zak appeared as the host on the second Stardust Reverie project album Proclamation of Shadows.

Since 2025 Savatage reunited for the first time in 10 years, with Stevens as lead singer.

== Discography ==
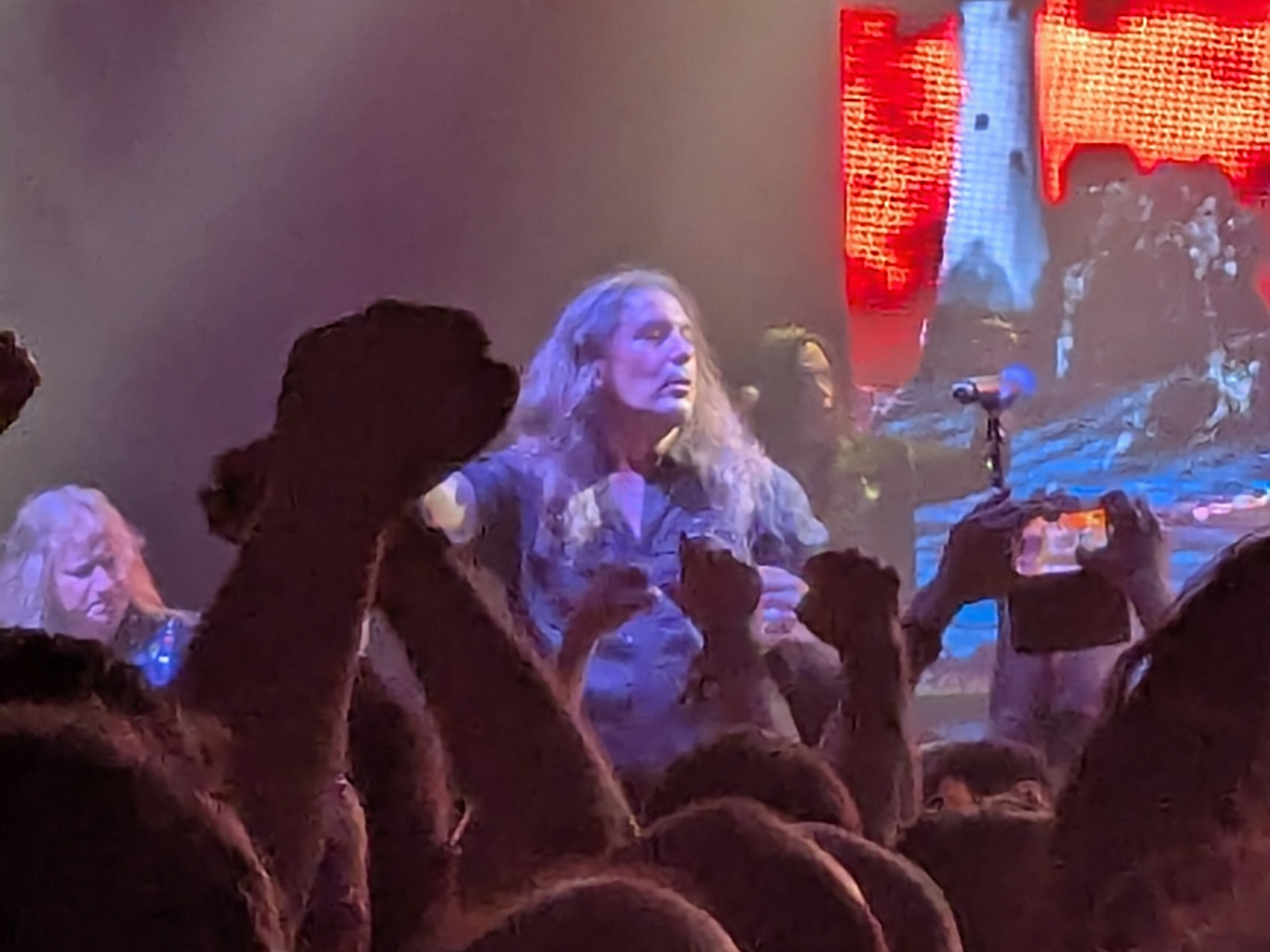
Stevens (middle) with Savatage in 2025

=== Savatage ===
- Edge of Thorns (1993)
- Handful of Rain (1994)
- Dead Winter Dead (1995)
- Japan Live '94 (1995)
- The Wake of Magellan (1997)

=== Trans-Siberian Orchestra albums ===
- Christmas Eve and Other Stories (1996)
- The Christmas Attic (1998)
- Beethoven's Last Night (2000)
- The Lost Christmas Eve (2004)
- Night Castle (2009)

=== Circle II Circle albums ===
- Watching in Silence (2003)
- The Middle of Nowhere (2005)
- Burden of Truth (2006)
- Delusions of Grandeur (2008)
- Consequence of Power (2010)
- Seasons Will Fall (2013)
- Reign of Darkness (2015)

=== Machines of Grace albums ===
- Machines of Grace (2009)

=== Empires of Eden ===
- Reborn in Fire (2010)

=== Stardust Reverie Project ===
- Ancient Rites of the Moon (2014)
- Proclamation of Shadows (2015)

=== Avalon ===
- "Neon Sirens" on Angels of the Apocalypse (2014)
- "Return to Eden", "Miles Away" and "Wasted Dreams" on Return to Eden (2019)

=== Sebastien ===
- "The Ocean" on Dark Chambers of Déjà Vu (2015)

=== EXXILES ===
- "Oblivion" (2015, guest vocals)

=== Todd Grubbs ===
- "The Man in the Hat" and "Stay Alive" on As the Worm Turns (2015)

=== Art X ===
- The Redemption of Cain (2016, guest vocals)

=== Archon Angel ===
- Fallen (2020)
- II (2023)

=== Tragedian ===
- Guest vocals on "Forces of the Light" on Seven Dimensions (2021)

=== Stranger Vision ===
- Guest vocals on "Before the Law" on Poetica (2021)

=== Hall Of Gods ===
- Guest vocals on "The Requiem"(2023)
