= Circle II Circle =

American metal band

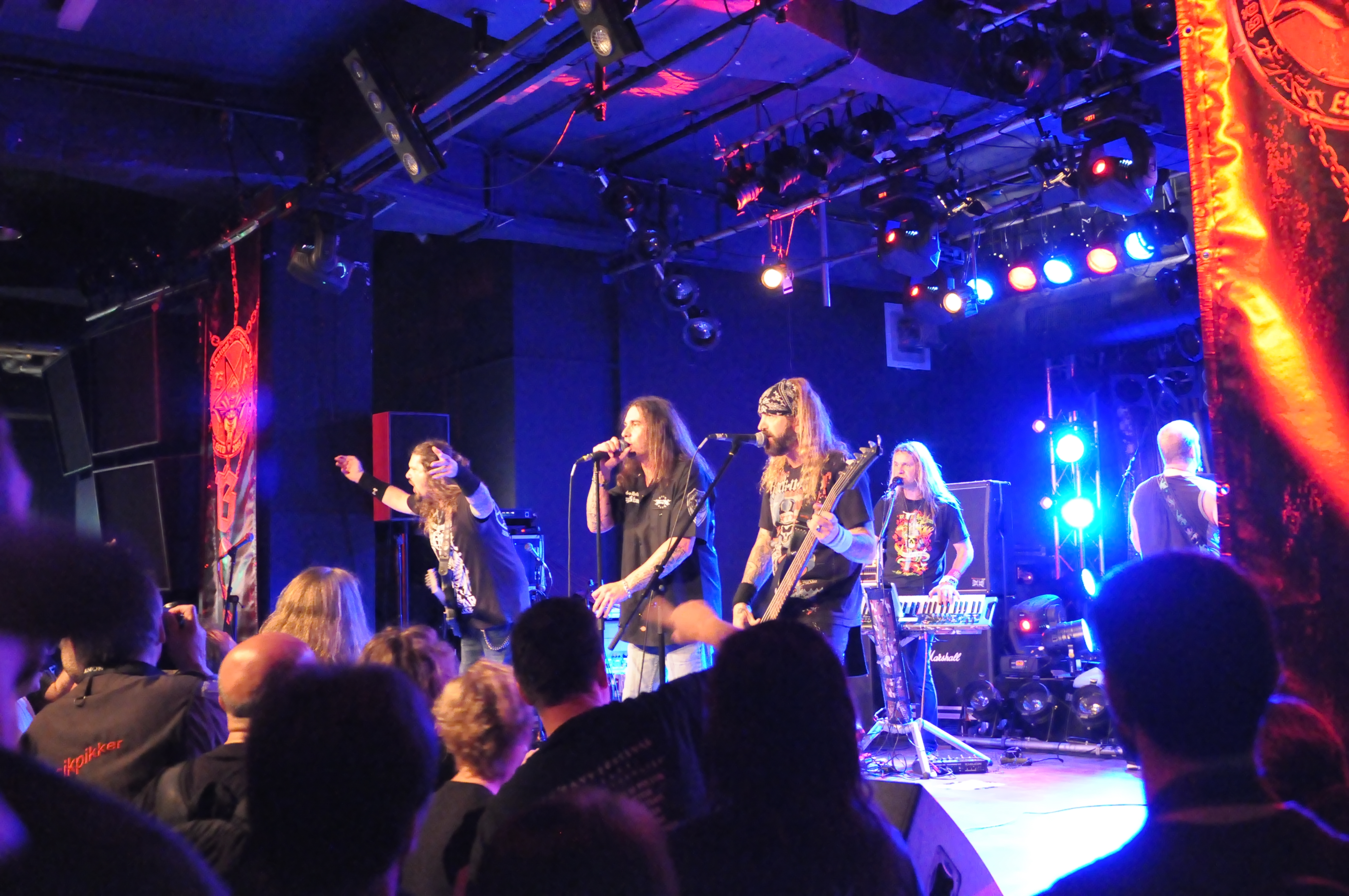

Background information
- Origin: Tampa, Florida, U.S.
- Genres: Heavy metal, power metal, progressive metal
- Years active: 2001–present (on hold since 2016)
- Label: earMusic
- Members: Zachary Stevens; Mitch Stewart; Christian Wentz; Henning Wanner; Bill Hudson; Marcelo Moreira

Circle II Circle is an American heavy metal band formed in Tampa, Florida by Savatage lead vocalist Zachary Stevens and band manager Dan Campbell in 2001. They play traditional heavy metal, power metal and progressive metal.

== History ==
Zachary Stevens was the lead singer of Savatage from 1992 until August 2000. After five albums, he left in 2000 citing family reasons. During the winter of 2001, Stevens and band co-founder, Dan Campbell, co-wrote with former Savatage lead singer Jon Oliva and guitarist Chris Caffery the songs for the Circle II Circle debut album, Watching in Silence. The second Circle II Circle record, The Middle of Nowhere featured Stevens's vocals along with band members Paul Michael Stewart, Andy Lee, Tom Drennan and Evan Christopher.

The band's third release was the concept album Burden of Truth, based on Jesus' descendants. It was released on June 6, 2006. The band signed with Intromental Management. Their fourth album, Delusions of Grandeur, was released on April 25, 2008.

Artwork for the band's logo and first three album covers were designed by Dan Campbell and rendered by artist Thomas Ewerhard. Additional artwork for the concept album Consequence of Power (2010) was created by Claudio Bergamin.

On January 25, 2013, Circle II Circle released their Seasons will Fall album on earMusic.

The live album, Bootleg Live at Wacken 2012, was released on June 20, 2014. A studio album, Reign of Darkness, was released on October 16, 2015.

On December 7, 2016, former drummer Adam Sagan died from cancer at the age of 35. The band has been on hold since.

== Band members ==
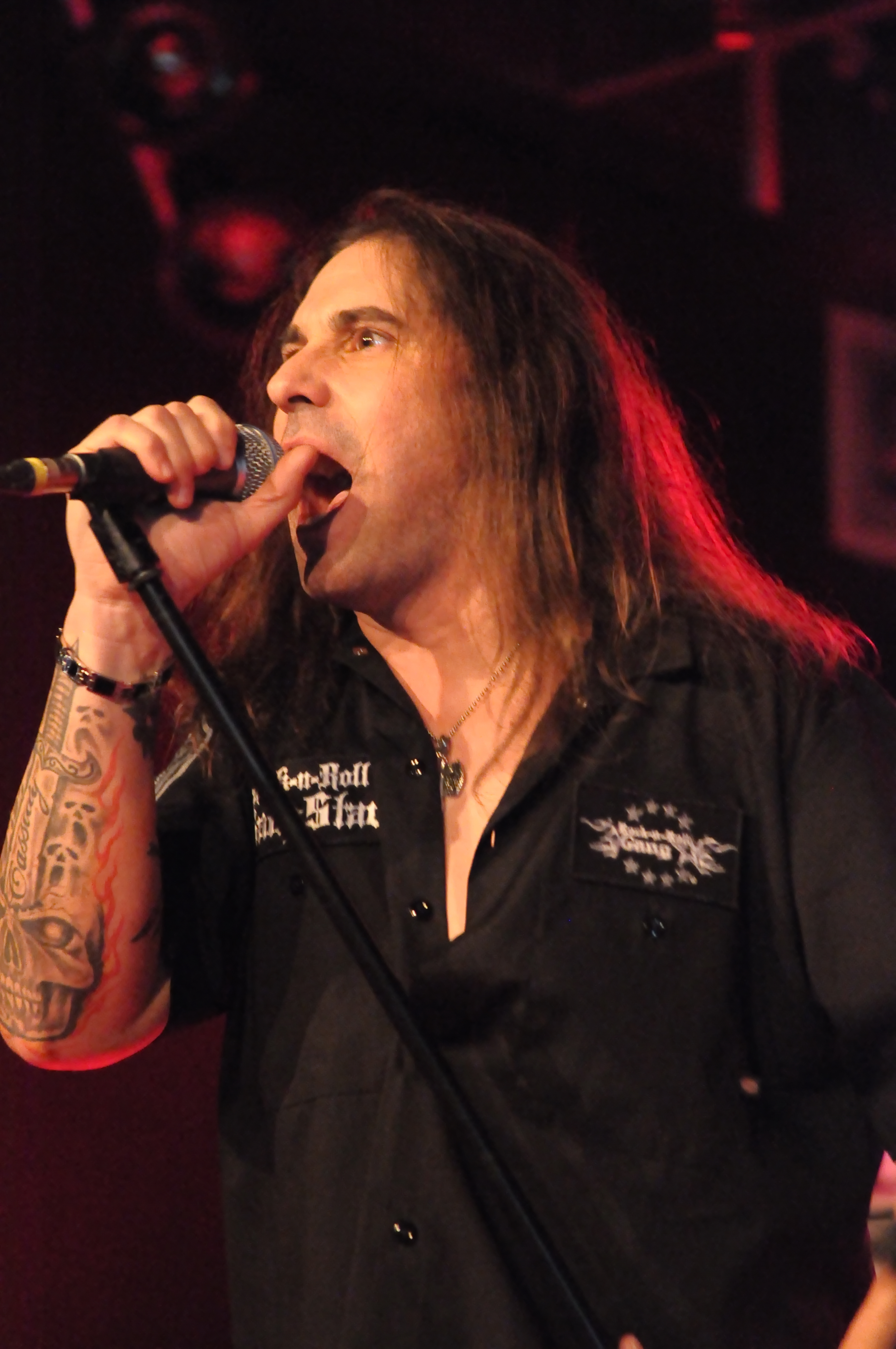
Zak Stevens

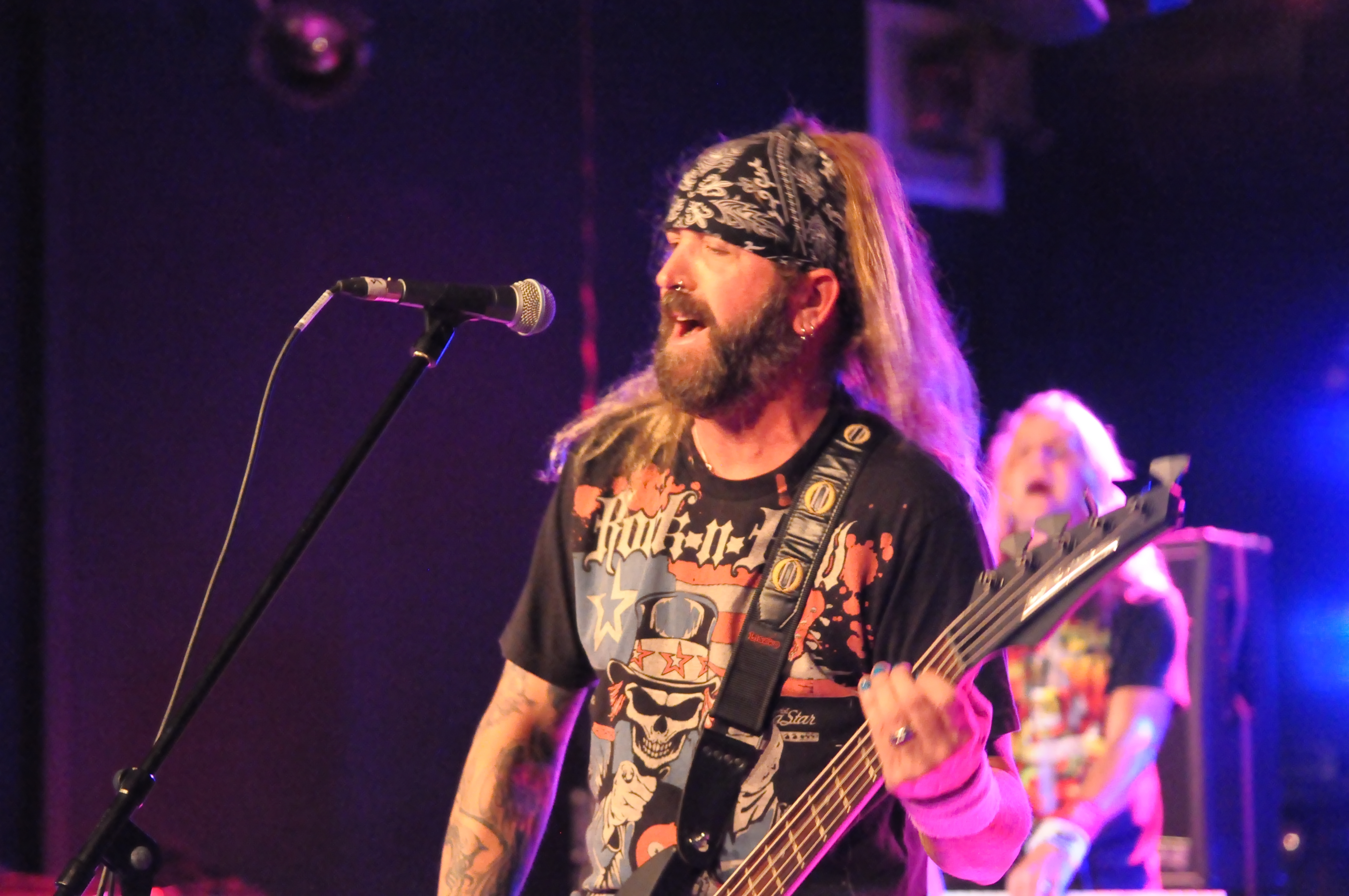
Paul Michael "Mitch" Stewart

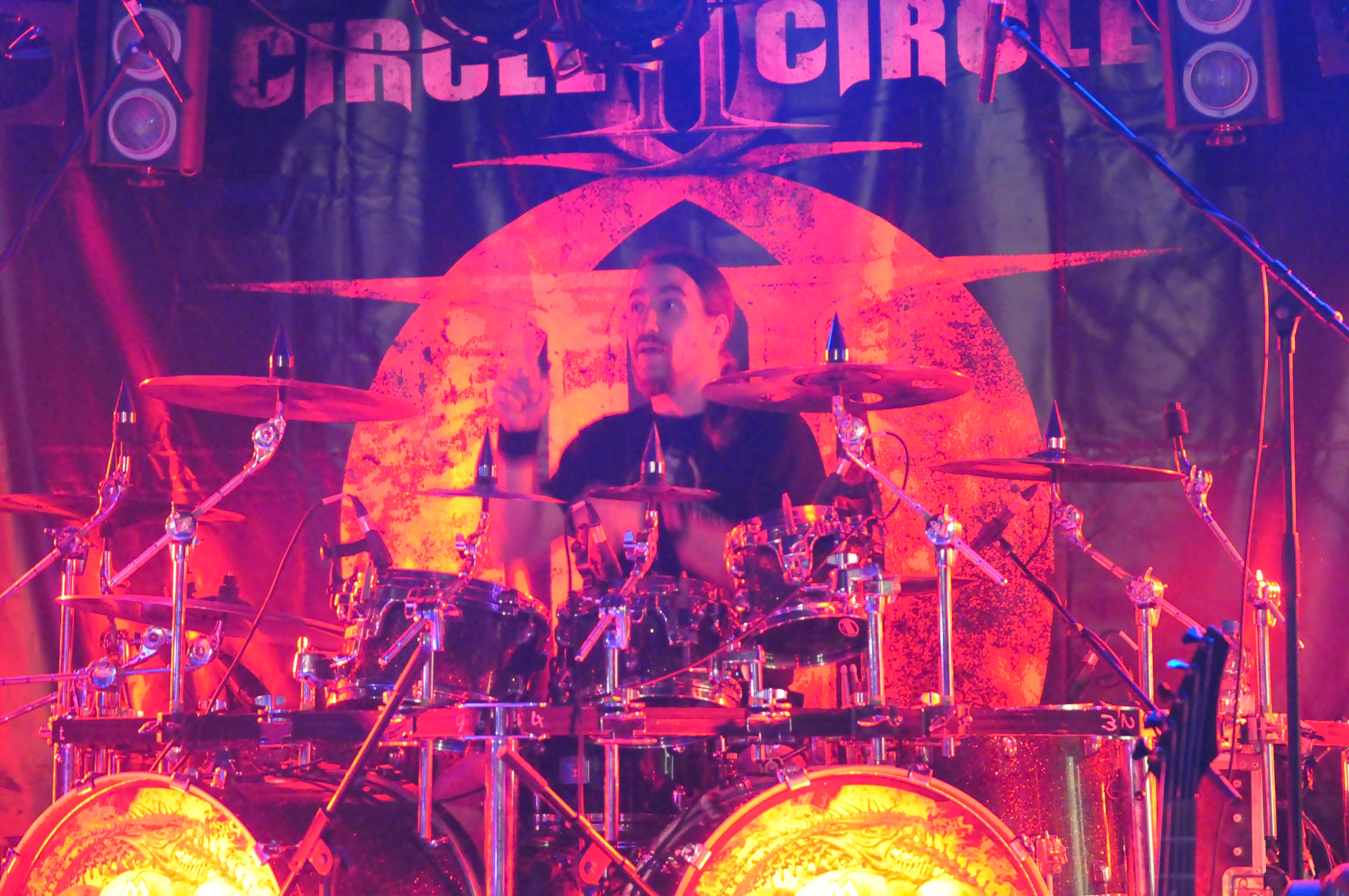
Adam Sagan

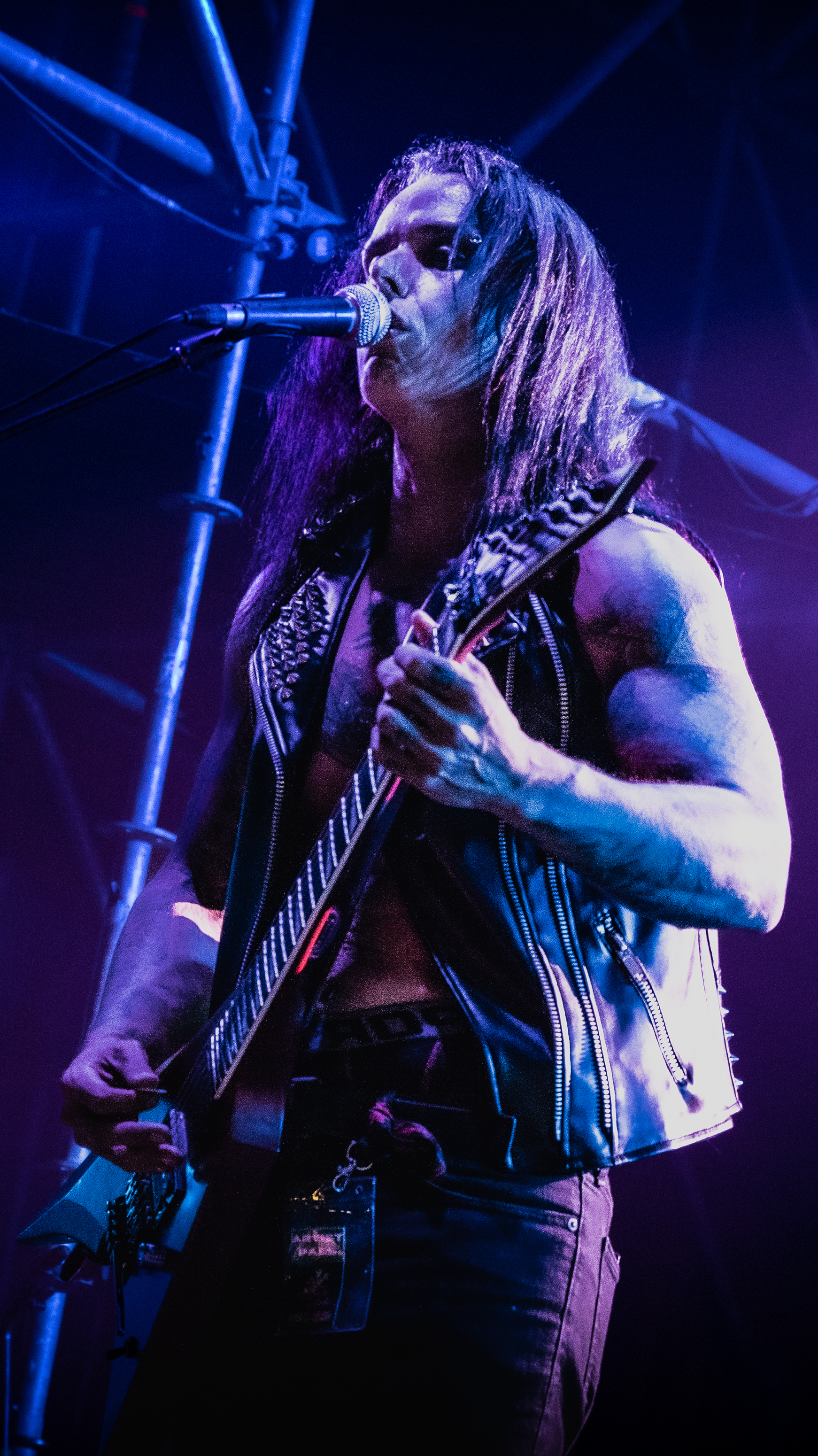
Bill Hudson

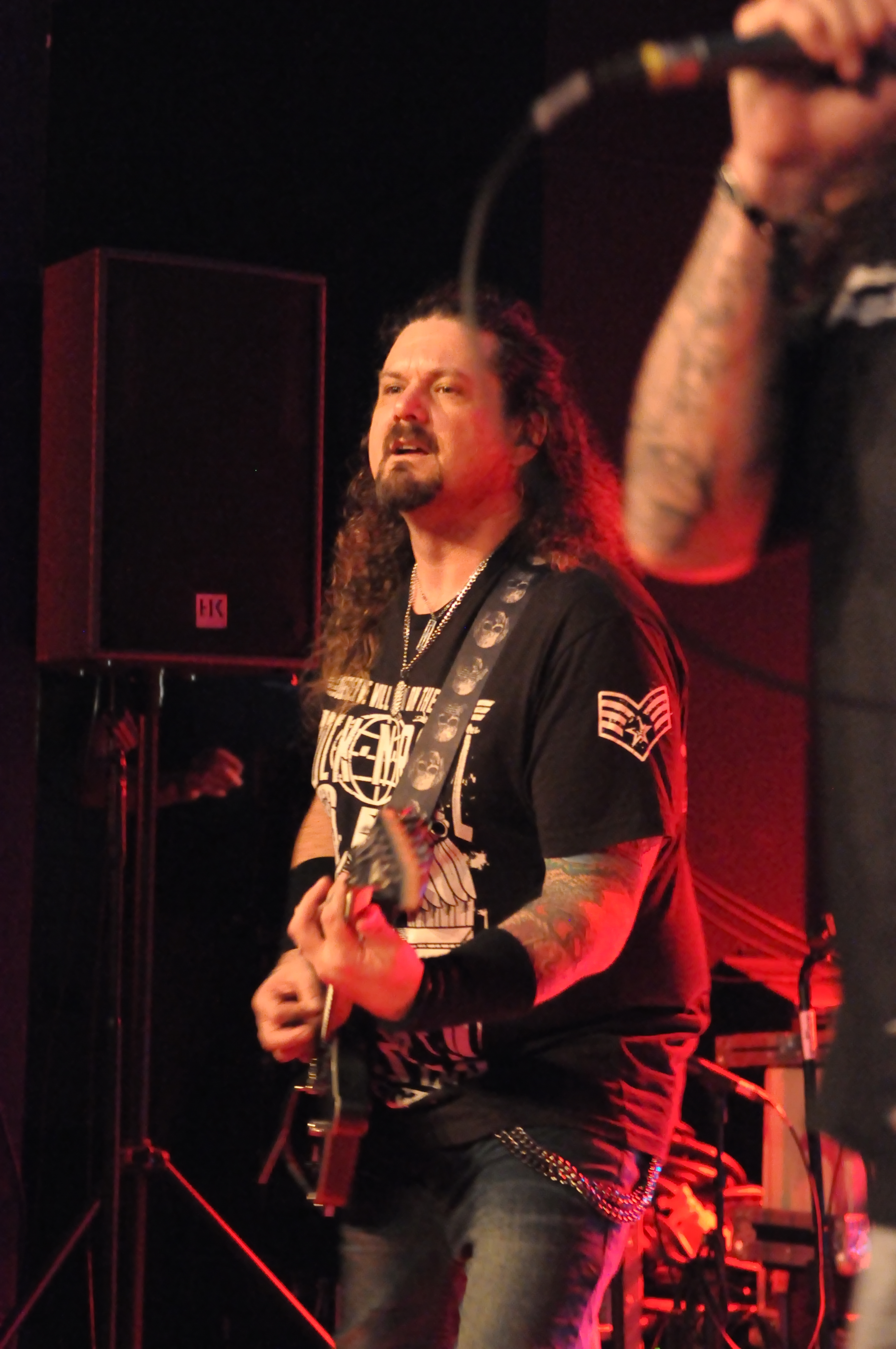
Christian Wentz

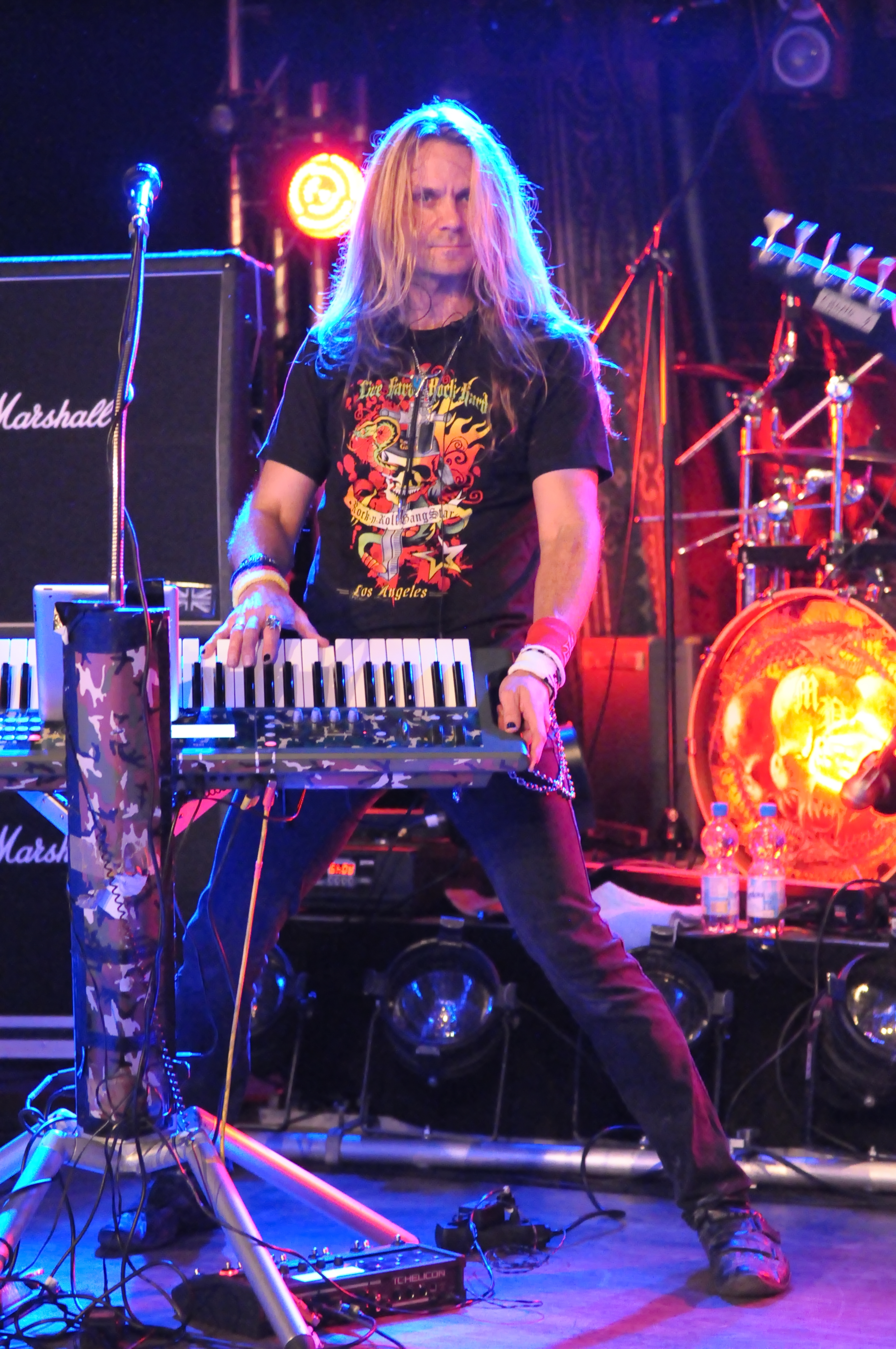
Henning Wanner

=== Current ===
- Zachary Stevens – lead vocals (2001–present)
- Paul Michael "Mitch" Stewart – bass, keyboards (2003–present)
- Christian Wentz – rhythm guitar (2012–present)
- Henning Wanner – keyboards (2012–present)
- Bill Hudson – lead guitar (2008–2009, 2012–2013, 2015-present)
- Marcelo Moreira – drums (2015–present)

=== Former ===
- Matt LaPorte – guitars (2001–2003, died 2011)
- John Zahner – keyboards (2001–2003)
- Kevin Rothney – bass (2001–2003)
- Christopher Kinder – drums (2001–2003)
- Tom McDyne – lead guitar (2003–2004)
- Andy Lee – rhythm guitar (2003–2010, 2011)
- Tom Drennan – drums (2003–2009)
- Evan Christopher – lead guitar (2004–2008)
- Oliver Palotai – keyboards (2006–2007)
- Johnny Osborn – drums (2009–2011)
- Rollie Feldman – lead guitar (2010–2011)
- Adam Sagan – drums (2011–2013, died 2016)
- Marc Pattison – lead guitar (2014–2015, died 2020)

== Discography ==
=== Studio albums ===
- Watching in Silence (2003)
- The Middle of Nowhere (2005)
- Burden of Truth (2006)
- Delusions of Grandeur (2008)
- Consequence of Power (2010)
- Seasons Will Fall (2013)
- Reign of Darkness (2015)

=== Live albums ===
- Bootleg Live at Wacken 2012 (2014)

=== Extended plays ===
- All That Remains (2005)
- Revelations (2006)
- Every Last Thing/So Many Reasons (2008)

=== Compilations ===
- Full Circle: The Best of Circle II Circle (2012)

== See also ==
- Savatage − Stevens sang lead vocals on four studio albums
- Trans-Siberian Orchestra − Stevens toured with the group as a vocalist
- Jon Oliva's Pain − formed by former Circle II Circle members
- Machines of Grace − Stevens is the vocalist
