= Symfonia =

Finnish power metal supergroup

- Origin: Finland
- Genres: Symphonic power metal
- Years active: 2010–2011
- Past members: Andre Matos; Timo Tolkki; Jari Kainulainen; Mikko Härkin; Uli Kusch

Symfonia was a short-lived symphonic power metal supergroup formed in 2010 by Andre Matos (vocals), Timo Tolkki (guitars), Jari Kainulainen (bass), Mikko Härkin (keyboards) and Uli Kusch (drums). On February 18, 2011, the band made its debut performance at the Finnish Metal Expo. The band released its only album, In Paradisum, in March 2011.

== History ==
After touring together as members of Stratovarius and Angra, guitarist Timo Tolkki and vocalist Andre Matos became good friends. When Matos moved to Sweden, Tolkki called him and told him he had some song ideas he would like to show him. On the condition of being part of the songwriting process but not of the managing duties due to his other activities, Matos flew to Helsinki and started working on the songs, though at that time they did not know if those songs would be used in a band, or a project or anything alike. Tolkki then completed the team with other musicians who were living in the Nordic countries back then: bassist Jari Kainulainen, keyboardist Mikko Härkin and drummer Uli Kusch. Months later, the five musicians met in Helsinki and started rehearsing.

By October 2011, the last news was that drummer Uli Kusch officially left the band to continue recovering from his nerve damage which made it impossible for him to play drums for a year. Uli Kusch was replaced by Alex Landenburg. The band did a tour in South America (mostly in Brazil) and would start to record a new album subsequently.

By December 2011, Timo Tolkki announced in his official Facebook page that he would probably never record anything again (he later announced he would return to music with his new project, Avalon). In his long post, Timo cited some problems during the recording and touring of the first Symfonia album. Symfonia's homepage has since been replaced with a big red square with the verse "key to the universe is love", which appears in the song "Key to the Universe" from Tolkki's solo album Hymn to Life. In a post at Symfonia's official forum Timo Tolkki stated that "ending the Symfonia as it is, was a rational decision based on both the opinions of me and Andre Matos and the hard evidence or facts.", thus confirming that the band is no more.

Commenting on the sudden end of the band in a 2013 interview, Matos said:

[...] all of us (the other members) received an email from him [Tolkki], where he stated like, 'Look, I think Symfonia didn't reach the level that I expected it should have reached. Therefore, I must say to you all that there's not going to be a second album. Therefore, I must say to you all that there's not going to be Symfonia anymore. And therefore, I also would like to let you know that I'm intending to quit my musical career forever.' And that was wow, kind of shocking for everyone, like we didn't know what to say. I knew stories from Timo. I had been warned before, because I am friends also with the other people who have worked together with him. But I mean, we had been working on this Symfonia thing for over a year, and nothing really weird happened before this very day. [...] and I said to him, 'Look, I have to respect your decision. It's your life, it's your decision. I still have my solo band which I will dedicate back again. I will go back to it. The only thing I would like you to do is to justify your attitude together with the people who are already compromised with this new record and a possible new tour, because I don't think it's really fair.'

Tolkki and Matos remained out of touch until Matos died on June 8, 2019.

== Discography ==
- In Paradisum (2011)

== Line-up ==
=== Last line-up ===
- Andre Matos - vocals (2010–2011)
- Timo Tolkki - guitar (2010–2011)
- Jari Kainulainen - bass (2010–2011)
- Mikko Härkin - keyboards (2010–2011)

=== Additional musicians ===
- Alex Landenburg – drums (2011)

=== Former members ===
- Uli Kusch - drums (2010–2011)
