= Revolution Renaissance =

Finnish power metal band

Background information
- Origin: Helsinki, Finland
- Genres: Power metal, symphonic metal
- Years active: 2008–2010
- Labels: Scarlet, Napalm
- Members: Timo Tolkki; Bruno Agra; Gus Monsanto; Magnus Rosén; Bob Katsionis
- Website: revolutionrenaissance.com

Revolution Renaissance was a multinational power metal band founded by guitarist Timo Tolkki after he left Stratovarius in 2008. The band released three studio albums before disbanding in 2010.

== History ==
=== New Era ===
The studio lineup for the New Era album was Michael Kiske, Tobias Sammet and Pasi Rantanen on vocals, Pasi Heikkilä on bass, Joonas Puolakka on keyboards, and Mirka Rantanen on drums. Tolkki himself is the only one included in the permanent lineup, which was announced later.

=== Age of Aquarius ===
In March 2009, the band released their second album Age of Aquarius with a permanent lineup when Gus Monsanto joined the band as the new lead singer. The band said that it was "by far the darkest, heaviest and most symphonic album that Tolkki has ever been involved in." In October 2009 Timo Tokki announced that both Justin Biggs and Mike Khalilov have left the band due to musical differences.

In November 2009, Blabbermouth.net reported that Magnus Rosén (former bassist of HammerFall) had joined Revolution Renaissance.

=== Trinity and breakup ===
In an interview with the Finnish news website kp24 published on 10 May, Timo Tolkki announced that Greek Firewind and Outloud keyboarder Bob Katsionis was the new keyboard player of the band and that they were currently mixing their third and final album, Trinity, which was released in fall.

On 28 July, Tolkki announced the breakup of Revolution Renaissance. He commented by saying:

"Due to my private problems, the lack of interest in Revolution Renaissance, shown by the promoters, and the current situation in the music industry that affects to everything including the production budgets, it has become impossible to continue the band. We have tried to book shows in these last three years, but we haven't been able to do so. A rock band cannot exist without direct contact to its fans. Therefore I have no other choice but to make the decision to stop the band and its activities due to the above-mentioned reasons. The third and final album of the band will be released at the end of September. From the bottom of my heart I would like to thank all the fans of my music throughout the years. It's been a great journey."

The third Revolution Renaissance album, titled Trinity, was released later in the year through Napalm Records.

== Band members ==
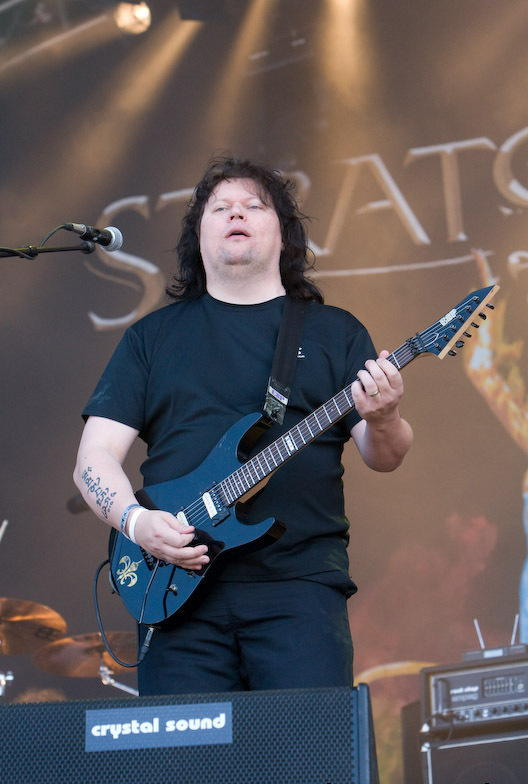
Band founder Timo Tolkki

=== Last lineup ===
- Timo Tolkki – guitar (2008–2010)
- Gus Monsanto – vocals (2008–2010)
- Bruno Agra – drums (2008–2010)
- Magnus Rosén – bass (2009–2010)
- Bob Katsionis – keyboards (2010)

=== Former members ===
- Mike Khalilov – keyboards (2008–2009)
- Justin Biggs – bass (2008–2009)

=== Session members ===
- Michael Kiske – vocals
- Tobias Sammet – vocals
- Pasi Rantanen – vocals
- Pasi Heikkilä – bass
- Joonas Puolakka – keyboards
- Mirka Rantanen – drums
- Magdalena Lee – vocals Tears of Magdalena
- Iva Gluhak – vocals

== Discography ==
=== Studio albums ===
- New Era (2008)
- Age of Aquarius (2009)
- Trinity (2010)

=== Demos ===
- Untitled demo (2008)
