= TNT discography =

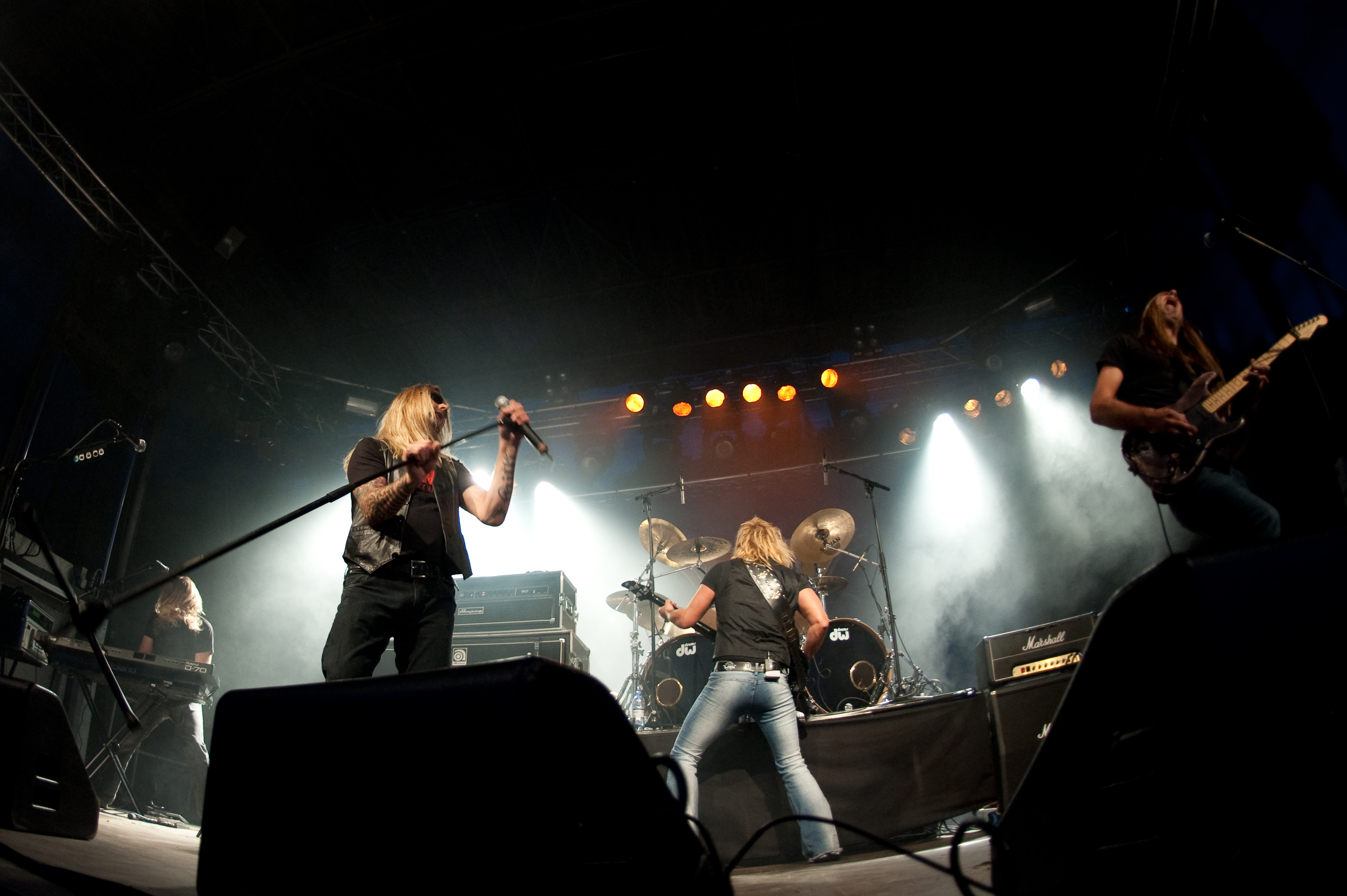
- TNT on stage in 2009
- Studio albums: 13
- Extended plays: 3
- Live albums: 4
- Compilation albums: 3
- Singles: 12
- Video albums: 1
- Music videos: 11

The discography of TNT, a Norwegian rock band formed in 1982, consists of thirteen studio albums, twelve singles, four live albums, three EPs, three compilation albums, and a DVD. This list does not include solo material or sideprojects performed by the members.

== Studio albums ==
Year	Title	Peak chart positions				Certifications (sales thresholds)
Year	Title	NOR	SWE	SWI	USA	Certifications (sales thresholds)
1982	TNT: Release: 1982; Label: PolyGram; Formats: LP, CD	16	—	—	—	
1984	Knights of the New Thunder: Release: 1984; Label: PolyGram; Format: LP, Cassette, CD	9	—	—	—	
1987	Tell No Tales: Release: 1987; Label: PolyGram; Format: LP, Cassette, CD	1	41	—	100	
1989	Intuition: Release: 21 February 1989; Label: PolyGram; Format: LP, Cassette, CD	3	19	27	115	
1992	Realized Fantasies: Release: 1992; Label: Atlantic Records; Format: LP, Cassette, CD	5	44	—	—	
1997	Firefly: Release: 1997; Label: Norske Gram; Format: CD	16	—	—	—	
1999	Transistor: Release: 1999; Label: Norske Gram; Format: CD	29	—	—	—	
2004	My Religion: Release: 8 March 2004; Label: MTM; Format: CD	14	—	—	—	
2005	All the Way to the Sun: Release: 2005; Label: MTM; Format: CD	29	—	—	—	
2007	The New Territory: Release: 7 May 2007; Label: Bonnier Amigo; Format: CD	11	—	—	—	
2008	Atlantis: Release: 22 September 2008; Label: Bonnier Amigo; Format: CD	14	—	—	—	
2010	A Farewell to Arms/Engine: Release: 15 December 2010; Label: TNT Records; Format: CD	—	—	—	—	
2018	XIII: Release: 6 June 2018; Label: Frontiers Records; Formats: CD, LP, digital download	10				

== Live albums ==
Year	Title	Peak chart positions				Certifications (sales thresholds)
Year	Title	NOR	SWE	SWI	USA	Certifications (sales thresholds)
1992	Three Nights in Tokyo: Release: 1992; Label: Atlantic Records; Formats: CD	—	—	—	—	
2006	Live in Madrid: Release: 27 November 2006; Label: MTM; Formats: CD	—	—	—	—	
2014	30th Anniversary 1982–2012 Live in Concert: Release: 2014; Label: Formats: CD	13	—	—	—	
2019	Encore: Live in Milano: Release: 2019; Label: Formats: CD	—	—	—	—	

== Compilation albums ==
Year	Title	Peak chart positions				Certifications (sales thresholds)
Year	Title	NOR	SWE	SWI	USA	Certifications (sales thresholds)
1996	Till Next Time – The Best of TNT: Release: 1996; Label: Mercury Records; Formats: CD	—	—	—	—	
1997	Firefly and Live!: Release: 1997; Label: Shrapnel Records; Formats: CD	—	—	—	—	
2003	The Big Bang – The Essential Collection: Release: 2003; Label: Universal; Formats: CD	5	—	—	—	

== Extended plays ==
Year	Title	Peak chart positions				Certifications (sales thresholds)
Year	Title	NOR	SWE	SWI	USA	Certifications (sales thresholds)
1984	TNT: Release: 1984; Label: PolyGram; Formats: LP	—	—	—	—	
2003	Give Me a Sign: Release: 2003; Label: MTM; Formats: CD	—	—	—	—	
2003	Taste: Release: 2003; Label: MTM; Formats: CD	—	—	—	—	

== Singles ==
Year	Title	Norway singles	Album
1982	"Harley-Davidson"	-	TNT
1984	"Seven Seas"	—	Knights of the New Thunder
1984	"American Tracks"	-	Knights of the New Thunder
1987	"10,000 Lovers (In One)"	2	Tell No Tales
1987	"Everyone's a Star"	—	Tell No Tales
1989	"Intuition"	5	Intuition
1989	"Tonight I'm Falling"	—	Intuition
1992	"Rain"	-	Realized Fantasies
1992	"Downhill Racer"	-	Realized Fantasies
1997	"Daisy Jayne"	-	Firefly
2005	"Sometimes"	-	All the Way to the Sun
2013	"Hidden Treasure"	-	Non-album single

== Video albums ==
Year	Title
2005	The Collection: Volume 1: Release: 2005; Label: Sorcery Studios; Format: DVD

== Music videos ==
Year	Title
1982	"Harley-Davidson" (version 1)
1984	"Harley-Davidson" (version 2)
1985	"Seven Seas"
1987	"Everyone's a Star"
1987	"10,000 Lovers (In One)" (Version 1)
1987	"10,000 Lovers (In One)" (Version 2)
1989	"Intuition" (Version 1)
1989	"Intuition" (Version 2)
1989	"Tonight I'm Falling"
2004	"My Religion"
2011	"Refugee"
