= The Big Bang: The Essential Collection =

Greatest hits album by TNT
- Released: 2003
- Recorded: 1982–2003
- Genres: Hard rock, heavy metal, glam metal
- Length: 78:08
- Label: Universal
- Producers: Bjørn Nessjø, Tony Harnell, Ronni Le Tekrø

TNT chronology
Transistor (1999)	The Big Bang: The Essential Collection (2003)	My Religion (2004)

The Big Bang: The Essential Collection is a compilation album by the Norwegian rock band TNT, released in 2003. The compilation mainly focuses on the studio albums the band released in the 1980s, from TNT (1982) to Intuition (1989). Guitarist Ronni Le Tekrø had suggested for the inclusion of several tracks from the 1992 album Realized Fantasies, however only the single "Downhill Racer" was included. No material was included from the band's most recent albums at the time, Firefly (1997) and Transistor (1999). The compilation also includes two newly recorded tracks, "Hey Love" and "Satellite", and an outtake from the Tell No Tales sessions, "Destiny".

The compilation went gold in Norway.

== Track listing ==
No.	Title	Writer(s)	From album	Length
1.	"Harley-Davidson" (UK version)	Dag Ingebrigtsen, Gustav Alfheim, Steel	TNT	4:06
2.	"Eddie" (US version)	Dag Ingebrigtsen, Steel, TNT	Knights of the New Thunder	4:44
3.	"10,000 Lovers (In One)"	Tony Harnell, Ronni Le Tekrø, Diesel Dahl	Tell No Tales	2:56
4.	"Intuition"	Tony Harnell, Ronni Le Tekrø	Intuition	4:18
5.	"As Far as the Eye Can See"	Tony Harnell, Ronni Le Tekrø	Tell No Tales	3:44
6.	"Tonight I'm Falling"	Tony Harnell, Ronni Le Tekrø	Intuition	3:54
7.	"Everyone's a Star"	Tony Harnell, Ronni Le Tekrø	Tell No Tales	3:22
8.	"Take Me Down (Fallen Angel)"	Tony Harnell, Ronni Le Tekrø	Intuition	4:26
9.	"Seven Seas"	TNT	Knights of the New Thunder	4:16
10.	"Downhill Racer"	Tony Harnell, Ronni Le Tekrø, Morty Black	Realized Fantasies	4:49
11.	"Forever Shine On"	Tony Harnell, Ronni Le Tekrø, Morty Black	Intuition	4:47
12.	"Break the Ice"	Dag Ingebrigtsen, Tony Harnell, Diesel Dahl	Knights of the New Thunder	2:24
13.	"Listen to Your Heart"	Tony Harnell, Ronni Le Tekrø	Tell No Tales	3:18
14.	"Last Summer's Evil"	TNT, Tony Harnell, Ronni Le Tekrø	Knights of the New Thunder	2:36
15.	"Caught Between the Tigers"	Tony Harnell, Ronni Le Tekrø	Intuition	4:14
16.	"Knights of the Thunder"	TNT, Tony Harnell, Diesel Dahl	Knights of the New Thunder	4:11
17.	"Sapphire" (instrumental)	Tony Harnell, Ronni Le Tekrø	Tell No Tales	1:16
18.	"End of the Line"	Tony Harnell, Ronni Le Tekrø	Intuition	4:20
19.	"Hey Love"	Tony Harnell, Ronni Le Tekrø, Anne Vada, Amund Enger	New song	3:44
20.	"Satellite"	Tony Harnell, Ronni Le Tekrø	New song	3:01
21.	"Destiny"	TNT	outtake from Tell No Tales	3:42

== Personnel ==
=== Band ===
- Dag Ingebrigtsen – vocals and guitars
- Tony Harnell – vocals
- Ronni Le Tekrø – guitars, guitar synthesizer, keyboards, 1/4 stepper guitar
- Steinar Eikum – bass guitar
- Morty Black – bass guitar, pedal synthesizer, fretless bass with reverb and chorus effect on "Forever Shine On"
- Diesel Dahl – drums, percussion
- Kenneth Odiin – drums, percussion
- John Macaluso – drums, percussion

=== Additional personnel ===
- Bård Svendsen – keyboards, programming and background vocals
- Håkon Iversen – background vocals
- Bjørn Nessjø – keyboards and programming
- Carlos Waadeland – keyboards and programming
- Kjetil Bjerkestrand – keyboards
- Joe Lynn Turner – background vocals
- Dag Stokke – keyboards
- Rich Tancredi – keyboards
- T.J. Kopetic – keyboards

=== Production ===
- Bjørn Nessjø – producer (tracks 1–18)
- Tony Harnell, Ronni Le Tekrø – producers (tracks 19–20)
- Rune Nordahl – engineer
- Björn Engelmann at Cutting Room Studios – mastering, remastering
- Tommy Hansen – mixing
- John Cappadona – front cover artwork
- Tor-Erik Ledang – cover design and additional artwork

== Sources ==
- http://www.ronniletekro.com/discography-album-18.html
