= Firefly and Live! =

Compilation album by TNT
- Released: 21 October 1997
- Recorded: 1992–1997
- Genre: Hard rock, heavy metal
- Length: 67:38
- Label: Shrapnel Records

TNT chronology
Firefly (1997)	Firefly and Live! (1997)	Transistor (1999)

Professional ratings
Review scores
Source	Rating
Allmusic	1.5/5 stars

Firefly and Live! is a compilation album by the Norwegian rock band TNT.

The first eight tracks on the album are taken from the studio album Firefly, while the rest of the tracks are taken from the live album Three Nights in Tokyo. "Angels Ride" and "Heaven's Gone" are not on this album as they were declared offensive by the label.

== Track listing ==
No.	Title	Writer(s)	Length
1.	"Firefly"	Ronni Le Tekrø, Tony Harnell, Morty Black	4:29
2.	"Somebody Told You"	Ronni Le Tekrø, Tony Harnell	3:58
3.	"Trippin'"	Ronni Le Tekrø, Tony Harnell	4:41
4.	"Daisy Jane"	Ronni Le Tekrø, Tony Harnell	4:44
5.	"Month of Sundays"	Ronni Le Tekrø, Tony Harnell	4:01
6.	"Sunless Star"	Ronni Le Tekrø, Tony Harnell, Morty Black	4:58
7.	"Soldier of the Light"	Ronni Le Tekrø, Tony Harnell	5:28
8.	"Moonflower"	Ronni Le Tekrø, Tony Harnell, Embee Normann	4:49
9.	"Purple Mountain's Majesty" (live)	Ronni Le Tekrø, Tony Harnell, Dag Stokke	6:42
10.	"As Far as the Eye Can See" (live)	Ronni Le Tekrø, Tony Harnell	4:47
11.	"10,000 Lovers (In One)" (live)	Ronni Le Tekrø, Tony Harnell, Diesel Dahl	2:55
12.	"Guitar Solo" (live)	Ronni Le Tekrø	7:00
13.	"Seven Seas" (live)	TNT	9:06

== Personnel ==
TNT

- Tony Harnell – vocals
- Ronni Le Tekrø – guitars, lead vocals on "Moonflower"
- Morty Black – bass guitar

Associated members

- Dag Stokke – keyboards
- Frode Lamøy – drums, percussion on studio tracks (credited as Frode Hansen)
- John Macaluso – drums, percussion on "Soldier of the Light" and live tracks

Additional personnel

- Embee Normann – flute, background vocals on "Moonflower"

== Sources ==
- https://www.amazon.com/dp/B00000108Z
- https://web.archive.org/web/20061225155616/http://richweb.allpar.net/TNT.htm
