= Till Next Time: The Best of TNT =

Greatest hits album by TNT
- Released: 1996
- Recorded: 1984–1989
- Genre: Hard rock, heavy metal, glam metal
- Length: 61:08
- Label: Mercury Records
- Producer: Bjørn Nessjø

TNT chronology
Three Nights in Tokyo (1992)	Till Next Time: The Best of TNT (1996)	Firefly (1997)

Professional ratings
Review scores
Source	Rating
AllMusic	4/5 stars

Till Next Time: The Best of TNT is a compilation album by Norwegian rock band TNT.

== Personnel ==
=== Band ===
- Tony Harnell – vocals
- Ronni Le Tekrø – guitars, guitar synthesizer, 1/4 stepper guitar
- Morty Black – bass guitar, pedal synthesizer, fretless bass with reverb and chorus effect on "Forever Shine On"
- Diesel Dahl – drums, percussion
- Kenneth Odiin – drums, percussion

=== Additional personnel ===
- Baard Svensen – keyboards, programming and background vocals
- Håkon Iversen – background vocals
- Bjørn Nessjø – keyboards and programming
- Carlos Waadeland – keyboards and programming
- Kjetil Bjerkestrand – keyboards
- Joe Lynn Turner – background vocals

== Track listing ==
No.	Title	Writer(s)	From album	Length
1.	"10,000 Lovers (In One)"	Tony Harnell, Ronni Le Tekrø, Diesel Dahl	Tell No Tales	2:54
2.	"Intuition"	Harnell, Le Tekrø	Intuition	4:18
3.	"As Far as the Eye Can See"	Harnell, Le Tekrø	Tell No Tales	3:42
4.	"Tonight I'm Falling"	Harnell, Le Tekrø	Intuition	3:54
5.	"Everyone's a Star"	Harnell, Le Tekrø	Tell No Tales	3:21
6.	"Take Me Down (Fallen Angel)"	Harnell, Le Tekrø	Intuition	4:28
7.	"Seven Seas"	TNT	Knights of the New Thunder	4:16
8.	"Tell No Tales"	Harnell, Le Tekrø, Dahl	Tell No Tales	2:23
9.	"Forever Shine On"	Harnell, Le Tekrø, Morty Black	Intuition	4:47
10.	"Break the Ice"	Dag Ingebrigtsen, Harnell, Dahl	Knights of the New Thunder	2:23
11.	"Listen to Your Heart"	Harnell, Le Tekrø	Tell No Tales	3:18
12.	"Last Summer's Evil"	TNT, Harnell, Le Tekrø	Knights of the New Thunder	2:36
13.	"Caught Between the Tigers"	Harnell, Le Tekrø	Intuition	4:16
14.	"Knights of the Thunder"	TNT, Harnell, Dahl	Knights of the New Thunder	4:11
15.	"Sapphire" (instrumental)	Harnell, Le Tekrø	Tell No Tales	1:16
16.	"End of the Line"	Harnell, Le Tekrø	Intuition	4:20
17.	"Electric Dancer"	Harnell, Le Tekrø	Intuition (Japanese edition)	4:45

Japanese edition
No.	Title	Writer(s)	Length
18.	"Tonight I'm Falling" (live)	Harnell, Le Tekrø	4:22
19.	"Take Me Down (Fallen Angel)" (live)	Harnell, Le Tekrø	5:18

== Album credits ==
- Bjørn Nessjø – producer
- Rune Nordahl – engineer
