= TNT (EP) =

EP by TNT
- Released: 1984
- Recorded: January 1984 in Nidaros Studios, Trondheim
- Genre: Heavy metal, hard rock
- Label: PolyGram
- Producer: Bjørn Nessjø

TNT is a 1984 English-language EP based on a selection of Norwegian-language songs from TNT's debut album TNT, released two years previously.

During Norwegian tours backing their 1982 Norwegian language debut, TNT experienced growing interest from abroad, and decided to record the first five songs, side 1 from their album in English versions.

Two tracks would reappear in English versions later, with Tony Harnell on vocals. Harnell rewrote the lyrics for "U.S.A." before the band included it on the Knights of the New Thunder LP and CD. "Eddie" was included on the U.S. LP release, replacing the song "Tor with the Hammer", and came as a bonus track on the European CD edition of Knights of the New Thunder, as well as on the single American Tracks which came in a bundle with the European LP. The English version of "Harley-Davidson" has been performed live several times by Harnell as well as his successor Tony Mills.

Ingebrigtsen's English-language version of "Harley-Davidson" was also included on the compilation The Big Bang – The Essential Collection.

== Track listing ==
=== Side one ===
No.	Title	Writer(s)	Length
1.	"Harley-Davidson"	Dag Ingebrigtsen, Gustav Alfheim	4:05
2.	"U.S.A."	Dag Ingebrigtsen, Ronni Le Tekrø, Gustav Alfheim	3:38

=== Side two ===
No.	Title	Writer(s)	Length
1.	"Rats"	Dag Ingebrigtsen, Gustav Alfheim	3:15
2.	"Prelude (Fuzz-Minor)" (instrumental)	Ronni Le Tekrø	1:16
3.	"Eddie"	Dag Ingebrigtsen, Gustav Alfheim	4:47

== Personnel ==
TNT

- Dag Ingebrigtsen – lead vocals and rhythm guitars
- Ronni Le Tekrø – lead guitars
- Morty Black – bass guitar
- Diesel Dahl – drums, percussion

Recording credits

- Bjørn Nessjø – producer
