= Mai Britt Normann =

Norwegian singer-songwriter

- Also known as: Embee Normann
- Born: 16 April 1966 (age 59); Gjøvik, Oppland
- Origin: Norway
- Genres: Jazz
- Occupation: Singer-songwriter
- Instruments: Vocals & guitar

Mai Britt "Embee" Normann (born 16 April 1966 Gjøvik, Norway) is a Norwegian singer-songwriter.

== Career ==
Normann has been a recognized songwriter in Norway and internationally for 25 years, after her acclaimed debut album Wonderland (Embee Normann, 1993). She also made lyrics for the Norwegian band Vagabond on their debut album Vagabond in 1994, TNT on their album Firefly (1997) with Three Nights Live in Tokyo, and the Ronni Le Tekrø album Extra Strong String (1998). Her second solo album release Full of Light (MB Normann, 2000). Normann writes most of her lyrics in English, increasingly also in Norwegian, and has relatively large catalog. She performed her song "Stormy Weather" together with Ronni Le Tekrø at the Norwegian TV show "Gundersen & Grønlund A/S" in 1992, which aired on NRK. In recent years, after her latest release which is called "In-Between Dusk & Dawn", she has been performing intimate concerts in and around her hometown, Gjøvik.

== Discography ==
- 1993: Wonderland (Stageway)
- 2000: Full of Light (Beatheaven)
- 2013: In-Between Dusk And Dawn (Enger Music)
- 2019: Drizzle (Embee Normann og Jørun Bøgeberg)
