= Gaia Epicus =

Norwegian metal band

Gaia Epicus is a Norwegian power metal band. They have released seven albums.

The band was started by Thomas Christian Hansen from Rana. He played under various band names in various genres. By the time Gaia Epicus started in 2001, the band was based in Trondheim. Joakim Kjelstad played guitar during the first years, alongside shorter-term members. Drummer Yngve Hanssen died in a car accident in 2005. Gaia Epicus also hosted several guest contributors including Morty Black, Roland Grapow and Andreas Olsson.

The band initially released on Portuguese label Sound Riot Records, but broke relations after Sound Riot Records had allegedly not upheld their obligations. The band then established their own label, Epicus Records, which also released tribute albums.

== Discography ==
- Cyber Future (demo, 2001)
- Satrap (2003)
- Symphony of Glory (2005)
- Victory (2007)
- Damnation (2008)
- Dark Secrets (2012)
- Alpha & Omega (2018)
- Seventh Rising (2020)
