= Tony Mills (singer) =

British rock singer (1962–2019)

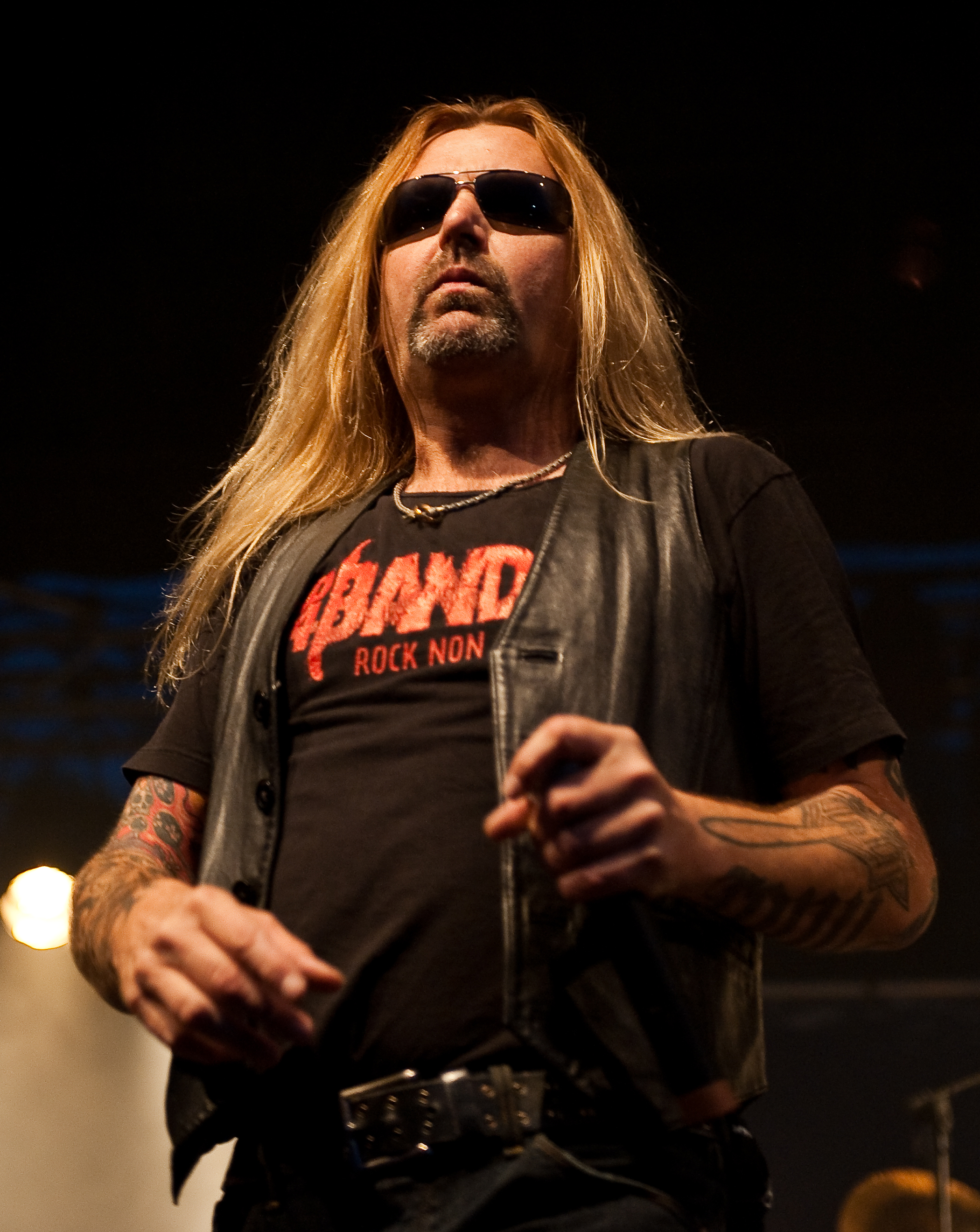
- Mills performing in 2009

Background information
- Born: Anthony Paul Mills; 7 July 1962; Solihull, England
- Died: 18 September 2019 (aged 57)
- Genres: Hard rock, heavy metal, progressive metal, pop rock, AOR, glam rock
- Occupation: Singer
- Years active: 1978–2019
- Labels: Z Records, Avalon, Bonnier Amigo Battlegod Productions

Anthony Paul Mills (7 July 1962 – 18 September 2019) was an English rock singer, best known for his work with Shy and TNT.

== Early life and career ==
Mills was born in Birmingham. In 1983 he joined the band Shy. He recorded eight albums with the AOR/glam metal band, including the Excess All Areas. He also toured with Shy, supporting Gary Moore, Meatloaf, Twisted Sister, Bon Jovi, Magnum, Manowar, Badlands, Enuff Z Nuff, Sleeze Beez, UFO, and the Ian Hunter/Mick Ronson outfit with whom he performed on stage in Brighton, just prior to Ronson's death. The tours spanned the whole of Europe and North America, it was here that Mills provided backup vocals to the Philadelphia-based band Cinderella on their debut album, Night Songs. Co-writing sessions came about with Don Dokken (Dokken), Michael Bolton, Michael Des Barres (Power Station), John Parker (Chicago), Jeff Paris and Bob Kulick.

== Solo career and reunion with Shy ==
Mills left Shy in 1991 when MCA picked him up as a solo artist to record his first album in Manchester with engineer Andy Macpherson and guitarist Bob Maxim along with various members of 10CC and Sad Cafe. Later, forming another band, Siam, he wrote and sang on two albums, Prayer and The Language of Menace. After working as a session vocalist through the 1990s with Slade, Simon Harrison, Dave Saylor and Cozy Powell (unreleased) in conjunction with his recording and touring work with Siam, the band eventually folded in 1996 and Mills spent a year fronting a Rush tribute band, YYZ. In 2000 he reunited with Shy for two more albums, Unfinished Business and Sunset and Vine. At the turn of the millennium, he released two solo albums, Cruiser and Freeway to the Afterlife. There followed a Danish tour with The Sweet, as bassist and lead vocalist, but this did not work out, and he returned to Shy.

== TNT ==
In 2006, he was asked to join TNT in Oslo, Norway to replace their long-time vocalist Tony Harnell who had decided to leave the band for both personal and professional reasons. The following year Mills sang on TNT's new album, The New Territory, which despite high sales, was poorly received by several rock magazines, who it seems were somewhat taken aback by the new material. The band toured and gigged extensively throughout 2007 in Norway to support the record, including supports to Ozzy Osbourne, Skid Row and Motorhead. Lasse Dale was also a progressive metal guitarist from Tromso in Norway, that enlisted Mills to write and record his debut album, Screaming For Silence. Mills worked for many European artists between 2006 and 2010, namely Michael Voss and his 'Voices of Rock' project, Liberty 'n' Justice in the U.S., Torben Enevoldsen in Denmark, Frederic Hugues and Blackstone and Tor Talle in Norway. Charity involvement for the Autistic Foundation for Children in North Trondelag, also saw the release of a single, "Keep The Dream Alive", along with its associated video through NRK with vocalist, Siv-Anita Strickhert.

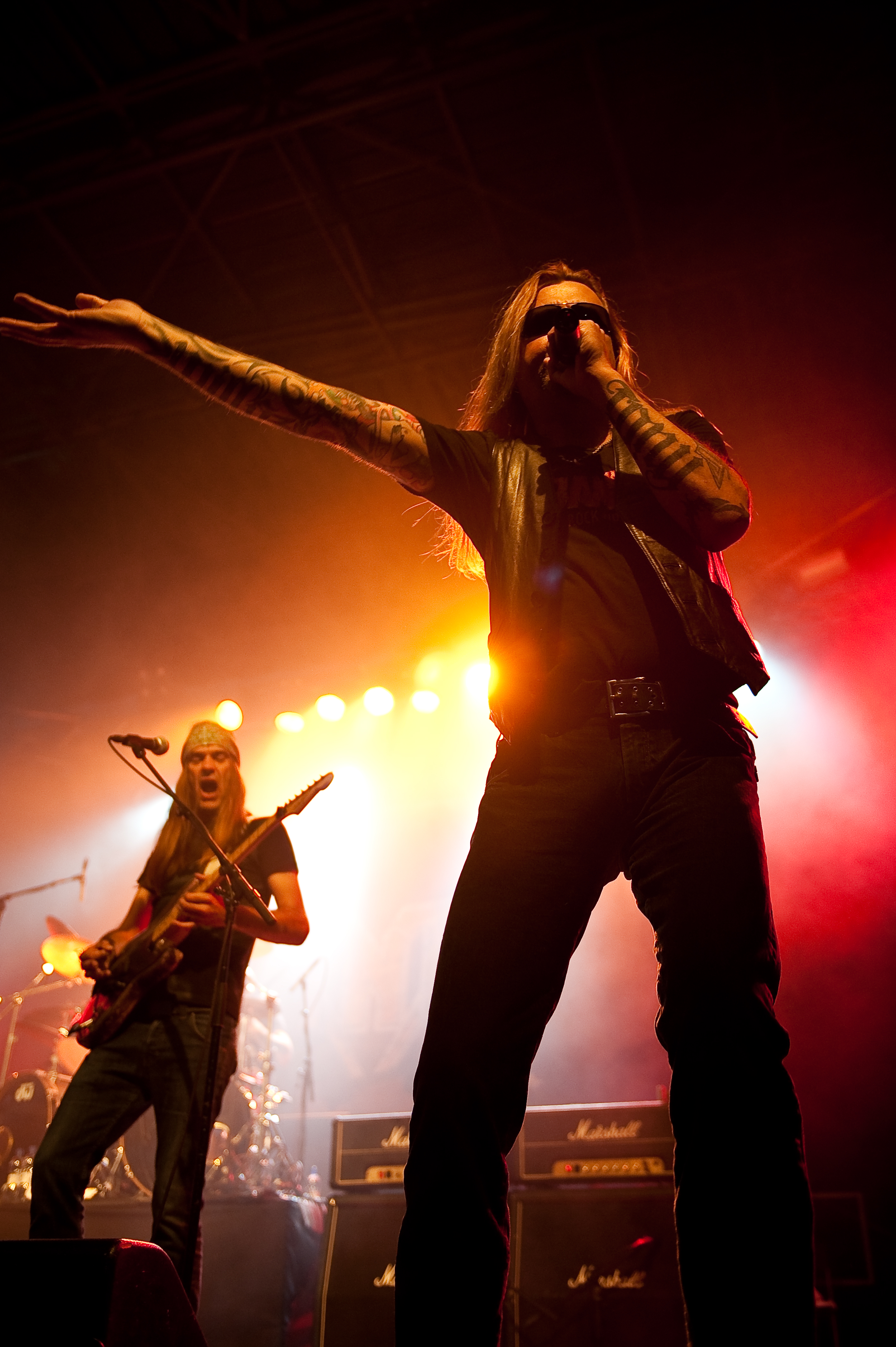
Mills (right) with TNT in 2009

In 2007, Mills also performed backing vocals on the debut album by the British band, Crimes of Passion. He has numerous credits for, and is in regular demand for, provision of backing vocals, and other recent outputs include The Andersson-Mills Project, China Blue, and backing vocals for Dante Fox in the UK and Norwegian rock outfit Winterstrain, appearing on their debut album Return to the Mirror as well as Shifting Sands. In 2008, Mills released a more metal oriented solo album Vital Designs, which featured bass by Morty Black, Oddvar Krogstad and Victor Borge (TNT), guitars by Neil Hibbs, keyboards by Shy's keyboard player Joe Basketts and drums by Shy's drummer Bob Richards. Also appearing on the album was TNT member Dag Stokke and Erik Ragno from China Blue. In the same year, he also began work with Ronni Le Tekrø on their second TNT collaboration, which resulted in the album Atlantis, featuring the songs "Tango Girl" and "Hello, Hello", which became regular tracks in their setlist for the following tour.

In the winter of 2008, Mills joined the band Serpentine, replacing former singer Greg Flores. In March 2010, Serpentine released their CD A Touch of Heaven on AOR/Metal Heaven in Europe and Marquee Avalon in Japan, gaining a glowing 92% review in rock magazine Burrn! as well as hitting number 72 in the HMV Japan chart. Around the same period, Mills was commissioned to write and record an album for AOR Metal Heaven records in Germany, entitled, State of Rock, with Robby Boebel from Nuremberg act, Frontline. Work was also completed on a more rock oriented TNT release for the end of the year, A Farewell To Arms, which returned to the classic sound of the band and was well received by fans and critics alike. Just after the summer, it was reported that Mills had suffered a heart attack at an airport in Norway, which prompted the singer to announce his departure from Serpentine before the completion of his second album with the band. The album has since been completed. Serpentine moved quickly to recruit 24-year-old British vocalist Matt Black as his replacement, to allow the band to commence touring to support the A Touch of Heaven album. The band's follow up, Living and Dying in High Definition also received great support from the media during its late 2010 release.

After a full recovery from his heart condition, at the opening of 2011, Mills had relocated to Norway to embrace the release of the latest TNT album and began touring to promote A Farewell To Arms, which in Scandinavia, was titled Engine. The change of album title for different territories was inextricably linked to his heart failure and consequent recovery. He consequently set to writing tracks toward a rock opera with Trondheim writer Andreas Nergard whilst touring Europe with TNT. Mills was also part of the Norwegian artist force supporting relief aid in Japan for their recent tragedies.

After increasing unrest in the Norway camp, Mills quit TNT in August 2013, after over seven years, to satisfy his own artistic integrity and produce more solo material.

== Later career ==
The onset of 2013 saw Mills writing new solo material including a single, "Girls in Norway" and two new albums; an AOR album for existing fans in Europe and Japan and a final album for the SIAM project involving members from the band's history and his new connections in Norway. Attempts to fire up Siam again were futile, so Mills reverted to the solo plan intent on recreating the same atmosphere that existed in the Siam days. As the writing had clearly split into two different projects, he focussed on the heavier album and finally completed it at the beginning of 2015, over two years later. The album, Over My Dead Body was released through Battlegod Productions on 23 February 2015. It was co-written by Robert Sall, Henning Ramseth, Paul Sabu and Douglas R. Docker. It was produced by Mills and mixed by his old colleague from the Shy era, Neil Kernon.

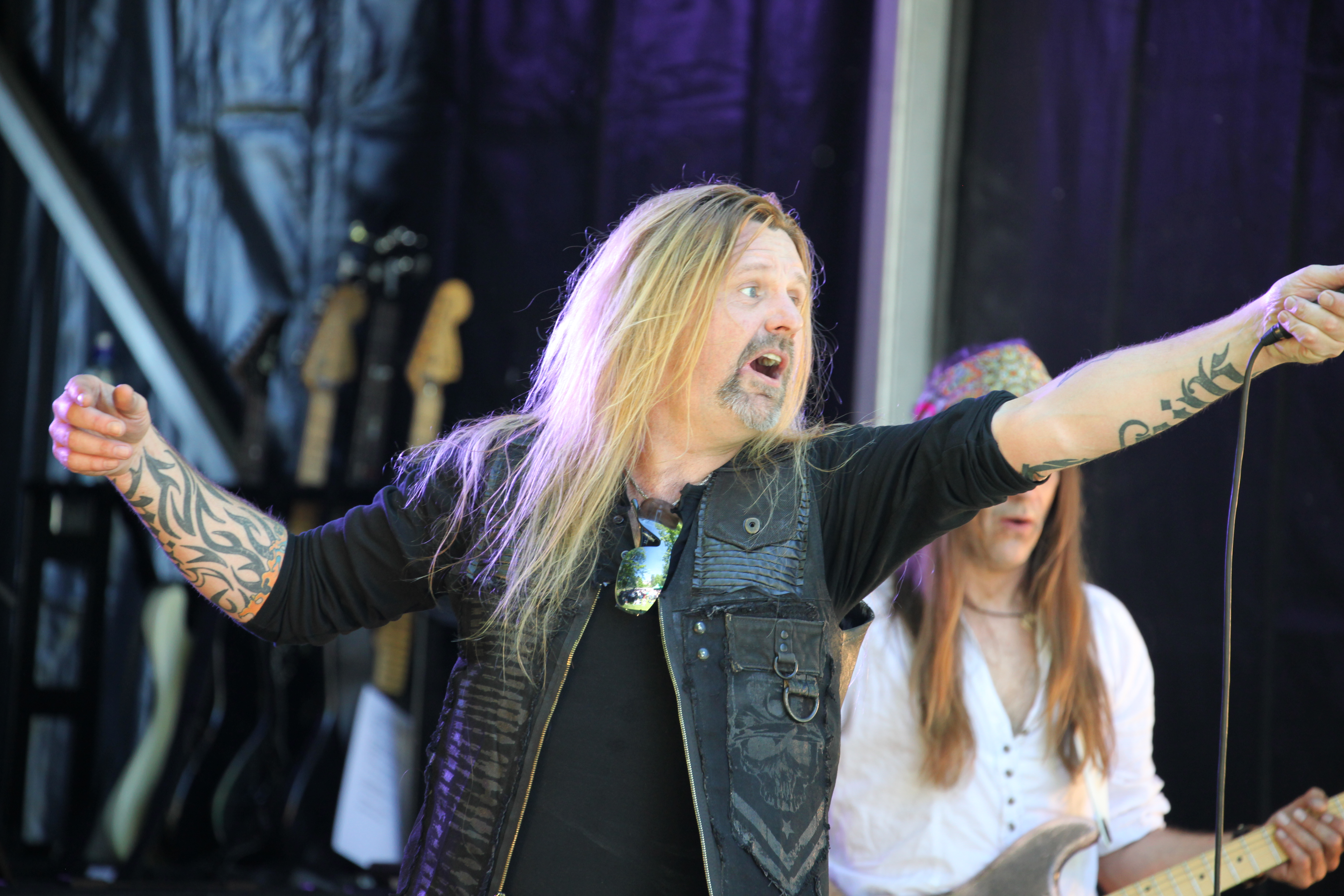
Mills performing in 2012

Ongoing projects at that time, included a new solo album, Streets of Chance, co written with Pete Newdeck, Tommy Denander, Robert Sall and Robby Boebel, and the co-writing of a new album by Italian metal stars, Crying Steel for 2017.

In 2012, Mills was featured on Douglas R. Docker's progressive rock space opera, Docker's Guild. He sang on three songs for the debut album The Mystic Technocracy - Season 1: The Age of Ignorance: "Legion of Aliens", "The Gem of Love," and "The Secret of DNA". He further contributed to projects such as Nergard, Guild, China Blue and Serpentine.

== Personal life and death ==
Mills married Linda Kristine in 2016, and lived on the island of Tjøme, off the south coast of Norway.

In April 2019, Mills announced that he was diagnosed with terminal cancer. Beyond the Law became his last album. He died on 18 September 2019 at the age of 57.

== Discography ==
Shy

- Once Bitten...Twice... (1983)
- Brave the Storm (1985)
- Excess All Areas (1987)
- Misspent Youth (1989)
- Regeneration (1999)
- Let the Hammer Fall (1999)
- Breakaway (EP) (2001)
- Unfinished Business (2002)
- Sunset and Vine (2005)
- Reflections: The Anthology 1983-2005 (2006)

Siam

- The Language of Menace (1994)
- Prayer (1995)

Solo

- Cruiser (2002)
- Freeway to the Afterlife (2005)
- Vital Designs (2008)
- Over My Dead Body (2015)
- Streets of Chance (2017)
- Beyond the Law (2019)

Lasse Dale

- "Screaming For Silence" (2006/2007)

The Andersson Mills Project

- Crank It Up (2007)

TNT

- The New Territory (2007)
- Atlantis (2008)
- A Farewell to Arms (2010)
- TNT 30th Anniversary (2013)

Tony Mills / Siv Anita Strickhert

- Keep The Dream Alive (2008)

China Blue

- Twilight of Destiny (2008)

Serpentine

- A Touch of Heaven (2010)
- Living and Dying in High Definition (2011)

State of Rock

- A Point of Destiny (2010)

Kaisas

- "Unify" (2011)

Nergard

- The Beginning (EP) (2011)
- Memorial for a Wish (2013)

Trine Rein

- 'The Earth Is Trembling' (2011 - Japanese Relief Aid Track)

Tommy Heart

- 'Help' 2011 - Japanese Relief Aid Track

Docker's Guild

- The Mystic Technocracy - Season 1: The Age of Ignorance (2012)

Crying Steel

- Stay Steel (2018)
