= Vagabond (Norwegian band) =

Norwegian rock band

- Origin: Trondheim, Norway
- Genres: Melodic hard rock; hard rock
- Years active: 1993–1996
- Spinoff of: TNT
- Past members: Jørn Lande; Ronni Le Tekrø; Dag Stokke; Morty Black; Steinar Krokstad; Hans-Olav Solli

Vagabond was a Norwegian metal rock band, formed in 1993. The band was formed by TNT guitarist Ronni Le Tekrø and bassist Morty Black following TNT's decision to go on a hiatus. In addition to Le Tekrø and Black, Vagabond's main lineup consisted of singer Jørn Lande, TNT live keyboardist Dag Stokke and drummer Steinar Krokstad. The band released two albums, Vagabond (1994) and A Huge Fan of Life (1995), before splitting up in 1996 due to TNT reuniting.

== History ==
Vagabond was formed by ex-TNT members Ronni Le Tekrø and Morty Black in 1993, after the break up of TNT. They were joined by ex-Stage Dolls member Steinar Krokstad, TNT's live keyboardist Dag Stokke and Sons of Angels vocalist Hans-Olav Solli, before Jørn Lande replaced the latter.

The band's first album, Vagabond, sold 10,000 copies in Norway, but they were dropped by the EMI label. They were then signed by the Japanese Victor label. Their second album, A Huge Fan of Life was released in Europe on the band's own record label.

Vagabond ended when TNT reformed in 1996, and subsequently the band members went their separate ways.

== Members ==
- Jørn Lande – vocals (1993–1996)
- Ronni Le Tekrø – guitars, backing vocals (1993–1996)
- Dag Stokke – keyboards, backing vocals (1993–1996)
- Morty Black – bass guitar, backing vocals (1993–1996)
- Steinar Krokstad – drums, backing vocals (1993–1996)
- Hans-Olav Solli – vocals (1993)

== Discography ==
=== Albums ===
- Vagabond (1994)
- A Huge Fan of Life (1995)

=== Singles ===
- "Key to the Rainbow" (1994)
- "Silent Woman Sheila" (1994)
