= Three Nights in Tokyo =

Live album by TNT
- Released: 21 December 1992
- Recorded: 22, 24–25 August 1992
- Genre: Hard rock, heavy metal
- Length: 64:20
- Label: Atlantic

TNT chronology
| Realized Fantasies (1992) | Three Nights in Tokyo (1992) | Till Next Time – The Best of TNT (1996) |

Three Nights in Tokyo is a live album by the Norwegian rock band TNT.

== Track listing ==
| No. | Title | Writer(s) | Length |
|---|---|---|---|
| 1. | "Purple Mountain's Majesty" | Tony Harnell, Ronni Le Tekrø, Dag Stokke | 6:42 |
| 2. | "Hard to Say Goodbye" | Tony Harnell, Ronni Le Tekrø | 5:23 |
| 3. | "Downhill Racer" | Tony Harnell, Ronni Le Tekrø, Morty Black | 5:08 |
| 4. | "As Far as the Eye Can See" | Tony Harnell, Ronni Le Tekrø | 4:48 |
| 5. | "10,000 Lovers (In One)" | Tony Harnell, Ronni Le Tekrø, Diesel Dahl | 2:55 |
| 6. | "Guitar Solo" | Ronni Le Tekrø | 7:01 |
| 7. | "Indian Summer" | Tony Harnell, Ronni Le Tekrø | 5:37 |
| 8. | "Lionheart" | Tony Harnell, Ronni Le Tekrø, Del James | 8:47 |
| 9. | "Seven Seas" | TNT | 8:41 |
| 10. | "Mother Warned Me" | Tony Harnell, Ronni Le Tekrø, Del James | 3:09 |
| 11. | "Everyone's a Star" | Tony Harnell, Ronni Le Tekrø | 6:09 |

== Personnel ==
=== Band ===
- Tony Harnell – vocals
- Ronni Le Tekrø – guitars
- Morty Black – bass guitar
- John Macaluso – drums, percussion

=== Additional personnel ===
- Dag Stokke – keyboards

== Sources ==
- http://www.ronniletekro.com/discography-album-14.html
