= TNT (TNT album) =

Studio album by TNT
- Released: February 1983
- Recorded: Nidaros Studios, Trondheim
- Genre: Heavy metal, hard rock
- Length: 35:00
- Label: PolyGram
- Producer: Bjørn Nessjø

TNT chronology
TNT (1983)	Knights of the New Thunder (1984)

TNT is the first album by the Norwegian rock band TNT. It is their only album to feature Norwegian lyrics.

In 1984, the first half of the album (side 1 on the original vinyl release) was re-recorded with English lyrics and released as an EP also named TNT. Bass player Steinar Eikum had been replaced by Morten Skaget (credited as Morty Black) for the English language recording. Two tracks would also reappear in English versions later, with Tony Harnell on vocals. Harnell rewrote the lyrics for "U.S.A." before the band included it on the Knights of the New Thunder LP and CD. "Eddie" came as a bonus track on Knights of the New Thunder and the single American Tracks. The English version of "Harley-Davidson" has been performed live several times by Harnell as well as his successor Tony Mills.

== Track listing ==
No.	Title	Writer(s)	Length
1.	"Harley-Davidson"	Dag Ingebrigtsen, Gustav Alfheim	4:05
2.	"U.S.A."	Dag Ingebrigtsen, Ronni Le Tekrø, Gustav Alfheim	3:38
3.	"Bakgårdsrotter"	Dag Ingebrigtsen, Gustav Alfheim	3:15
4.	"Etyde i fuzz-mål" (instrumental)	Ronni Le Tekrø	1:16
5.	"Eddie"	Dag Ingebrigtsen, Gustav Alfheim	4:47
6.	"Showet er i gang"	Dag Ingebrigtsen, Gustav Alfheim	3:36
7.	"Pirrende Irene"	Dag Ingebrigtsen, Gustav Alfheim	3:29
8.	"Mafia"	Dag Ingebrigtsen, Ronni Le Tekrø, Gustav Alfheim	3:07
9.	"Eventyr"	Dag Ingebrigtsen, Gustav Alfheim	3:42
10.	"Varmt & Hardt"	Dag Ingebrigtsen, Gustav Alfheim	4:05

== Personnel ==
TNT

- Dag Ingebrigtsen – lead vocals and rhythm guitars
- Ronni Le Tekrø – lead guitars
- Steinar Eikum – bass guitar
- Diesel Dahl – drums, percussion

== Album credits ==
- Bjørn Nessjø – producer
- Rune Nordahl – engineer

== Sources ==
- http://www.ronniletekro.com/discography-album-8.html
