= Frode Lamøy =

Norwegian-born drummer (born 1972)

- Also known as: Frode Hansen
- Born: 2 April 1972 (age 53)
- Genres: Hard rock
- Instrument: Drums
- Years active: 1996–present

Frode Lamøy (born 2 April 1972) is a Norwegian-born drummer. He has played with bands such as Jack In The Box, Autopulver and TNT. He is also co-founder of the music and website development company Sounds Like You with his brother, Rune Lamøy.

== Discography ==
=== Albums ===
- Jack in the Box - Stigma (1995)
- Shave - Shave (1996)
- Autopulver - F-words (1997)
- TNT - Firefly (1997)
- Sphere - sirMania (1998)
- TNT - Transistor (1999)
- Autopulver - Vapor Trails (1999)
- Ronni Le Tekrø - Extra Strong String (2000)
- Gylder - Gnist (2004)
- Magne F - Past Perfect Future Tense (2004)
- Various Artists - Rørt og Urørt (2005)
- One People - Tatanka Volume 1 (2006)

=== Singles / EPs ===
- Jack in the Box - "Rockjumping" (1993)
- Autopulver - "Frisbee" (1997)
- Autopulver - "Funfair" (1998)
- Autopulver - "Being Boring" (1998)
- Autopulver - "Remedy/Surgery" (1999)
- Autopulver - "If I Get Too Deep" (1999)
- Autopulver - "Kissing Like a Mainstream" (2000)
- Autopulver - "By Leaving Rome I Found My Home" (2000)
- The Landlords - "Meant to Be" (2002)
