= Transistor (TNT album) =

Studio album by TNT
- Released: 4 August 1999 (Japan); 10 August 1999 (Norway)
- Recorded: 1998–1999
- Studio: Studio Studio, Nyhagen, Norway
- Genre: Hard rock, alternative rock
- Length: 42:27
- Label: Norske Gram, Spitfire Records, Victor Entertainment
- Producer: Ken Ingwersen

TNT chronology
Firefly and Live! (1997)	Transistor (1999)	The Big Bang – The Essential Collection (2003)

Professional ratings
Review scores
Source	Rating
AllMusic	3/5 stars

Transistor is the seventh studio album by the Norwegian rock band TNT. While it kept the alternative feel of Firefly, it was more successful, with the song "Just Like God" receiving some airplay at US College radio stations.

== Reception ==
The album was met with mixed reviews amongst fans and reviewers alike. It was given max score in Oppland Arbeiderblad while bigger tabloid newspapers in Norway give it a 4 out of 6. Amongst fans, some didn't like the new experimental side of TNT, while the others enjoyed it. In retrospect, it's now considered a crucial moment in the band's history, showcasing the band's experimentation with different styles. Morty Black stated in an interview that Transistor was a natural progression from Firefly. Tony Harnell's solid vocal effort on the album is widely considered to be one of the strongest vocal performances he did for TNT.

== Track listing ==
All tracks are written by Tony Harnell and Ronni Le Tekrø.

No.	Title	Length
1.	"Just Like God"	3:55
2.	"Wide Awake"	3:25
3.	"No Such Thing"	3:59
4.	"Crashing Down"	3:39
5.	"Fantasia Española"	4:47
6.	"Because I Love You"	4:36
7.	"The Whole You're Inn"	4:00
8.	"Mousetrap"	3:01
9.	"Into Pieces"	4:09
10.	"Under My Pillow"	4:26
11.	"No Guarantees"	2:31
Total length:		42:27

Japanese edition
No.	Title	Length
1.	"No Such Thing"	3:59
2.	"Wide Awake"	3:25
3.	"Because I Love You"	4:36
4.	"Mousetrap"	3:01
5.	"Fanti"	4:46
6.	"Under My Pillow"	4:26
7.	"The Hole You're Inn"	4:00
8.	"Crashing Down"	3:39
9.	"Into Pieces"	4:09
10.	"No Guarantees"	2:31
11.	"Free Again" (bonus track)	4:41
Total length:		43:13

"Just Like God" is not included on the Japanese edition.

== Personnel ==
TNT

- Tony Harnell – vocals
- Ronni Le Tekrø – guitars, backing vocals on "Free Again"
- Morty Black – bass guitar, backing vocals on "Free Again"

Associated members

- Dag Stokke – keyboards
- Frode Lamøy – drums, percussion

Additional personnel

- Embee Normann – background vocals on "Under My Pillow"
- Eli Kristin Hagen – background vocals on "Into Pieces"

== Album credits ==
- Ken Ingwersen – producer, mixing
- Dag Stokke – engineer
- Tina Norris – cover model
