= A Farewell to Arms (album) =

2010 album by TNT

A Farewell to Arms / Engine

Studio album by TNT
- Released: 15 December 2010 (Japan); 27 December 2010 (Norway)
- Genre: Hard rock, heavy metal
- Length: 38:10
- Label: TNT
- Producer: Ronni Le Tekrø

TNT chronology
Atlantis (2008)	A Farewell to Arms / Engine (2010)	XIII (2018)

Alternative cover
- Engine cover

A Farewell to Arms (titled Engine in the US and Scandinavia) is the twelfth studio album by the Norwegian rock band TNT, released in December 2010. The album is in stark contrast to the previous two TNT albums, being a very 1980s-melodic rock-oriented album.

== Reception ==
Pre-release press has given the album high praise. Melodicrock.com, who had given the band's previous two releases highly negative reviews, said on a front page update "there's something a little different about this album. It rocks!"

Reception for the album has been generally well received. Hardrock Haven's Derrick Miller gave the album 8.9/10. Scream magazine gave a similar score.

== Track listing ==
No.	Title	Writer(s)	Length
1.	"Engine"	Ronni Le Tekrø	4:37
2.	"Refugee"	Ronni Le Tekrø, Tony Mills	4:18
3.	"Ship in the Night"	Ronni Le Tekrø	4:00
4.	"Take It Like a Man – Woman!"	Ronni Le Tekrø, Tony Caputo, Tony Mills	3:01
5.	"Come"	Ronni Le Tekrø, Tony Mills	3:41
6.	"Barracuda"	Ronni Le Tekrø, Tony Mills	2:39
7.	"A Signature on a Demon's Self-portrait" (instrumental)	Ronni Le Tekrø	0:57
8.	"Don't Misunderstand Me"	Ronni Le Tekrø, Tony Mills	3:28
9.	"A Farewell to Arms"	Ronni Le Tekrø, Tony Mills	2:39
10.	"Someone Else"	Ronni Le Tekrø, Tony Mills	4:21
11.	"God Natt, Marie"	Ronni Le Tekrø, Tony Mills	4:28

Norwegian edition
No.	Title	Writer(s)	Length
12.	"June" (live)	Ronni Le Tekrø, Tony Mills	3:56

European edition
No.	Title	Writer(s)	Length
12.	"Harley-Davidson"	Dag Ingebrigtsen, Ronni Le Tekrø, Gustav Alfheim, Tony Mills	3:35

Japanese edition
No.	Title	Writer(s)	Length
12.	"Not Only Lonely"	Ronni Le Tekrø, Carina Helene Tekrø Hermstad	3:39

== Personnel ==
TNT

- Tony Mills – vocals
- Ronni Le Tekrø – guitars
- Victor Borge – bass guitar
- Diesel Dahl – drums and percussion

Additional personnel

- Dag Stokke – keyboards on "God Natt, Marie"
- Bård Svendsen – backing vocals, organ on "Barracuda"

Production

- Ronni Le Tekrø – producer, mixing
- Tommy Hansen – mixing, mastering
- Kjartan Hesthagen – engineer
- Erland Hvalby – executive producer
