= Victor Borge (bassist) =

Norwegian rock musician

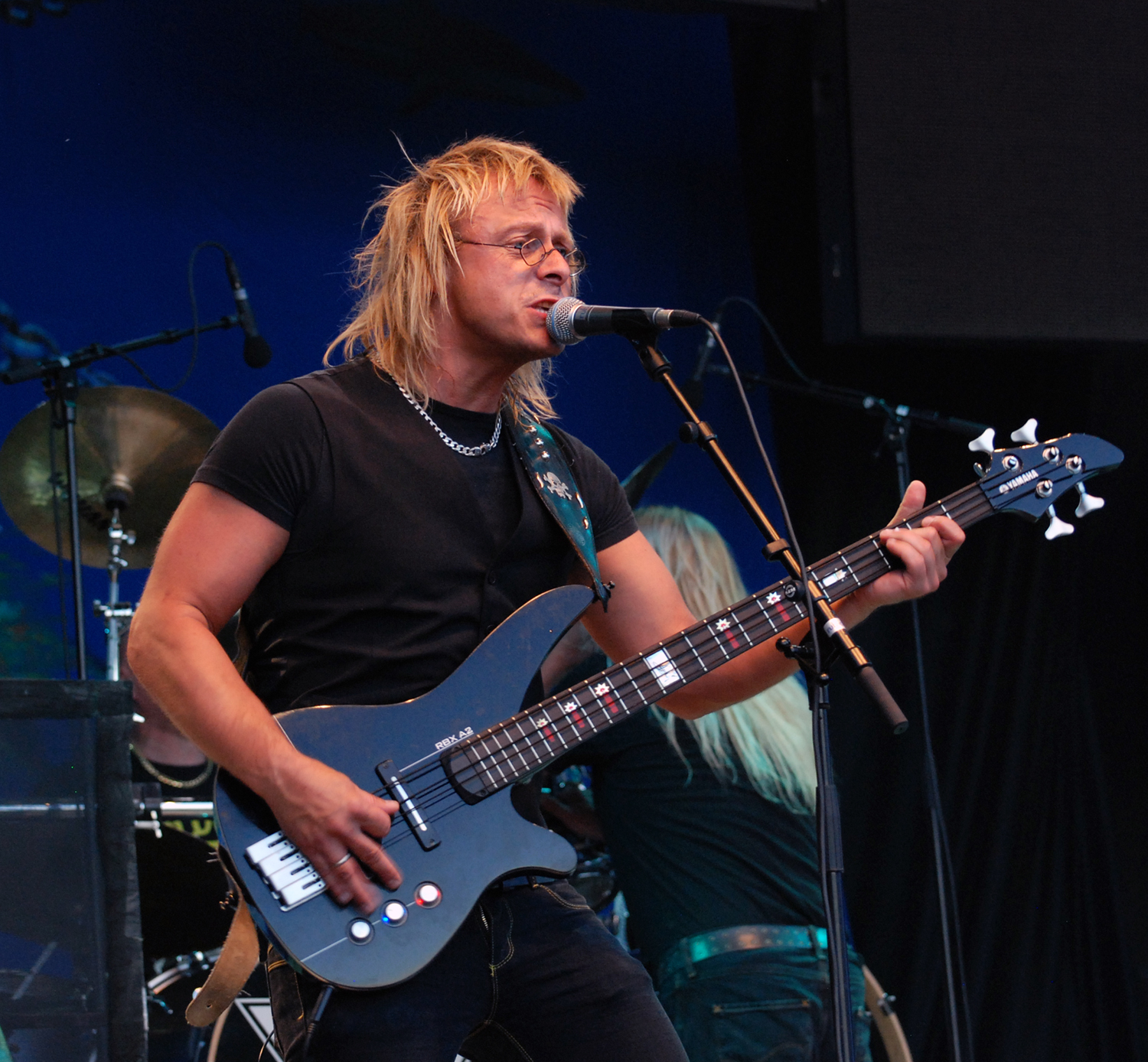
- Borge in 2009

Background information
- Birth name: Victor Cito Borge
- Also known as: Sir Graanug
- Born: 18 December 1965 (age 59); Grünerløkka, Oslo, Norway
- Genres: Hard rock
- Instrument: Bass guitar
- Years active: 1995–present

Victor Cito Borge (born 18 December 1965 in Grünerløkka, Oslo, Norway) is a bassist best known for playing in the Norwegian hard rock band TNT. He joined TNT in 2005, replacing Sid Ringsby, and played on three studio albums and one live album. Borge left TNT in December 2012 to pursue another project, but rejoined in late 2013.

Borge started playing the bass when he was 8 years old. He has also played in the black metal bands Khold and Tulus, and the rock bands Jack in the Box and Autopulver, both of which included former TNT drummer Frode Lamøy.

== Discography ==
=== TNT ===
- Live in Madrid - CD + DVD package (2006)
- The New Territory (2007)
- Atlantis (2008)
- A Farewell to Arms (2010)

== Sources ==
- http://www.tnttheband.com/victor.html
