= My Religion (album) =

Studio album by TNT
- Released: 8 March 2004
- Recorded: Studio Studio, Nyhagen, Norway
- Genre: Hard rock, glam metal
- Length: 44:50
- Label: MTM
- Producer: Tony Harnell, Ronni Le Tekrø

TNT chronology
The Big Bang – The Essential Collection (2003)	My Religion (2004)	All the Way to the Sun (2005)

Professional ratings
Review scores
Source	Rating
AllMusic	link

My Religion is the eighth studio album by the Norwegian rock band TNT, released on 8 March 2004. It marked a return to the glam metal direction that ended with Realized Fantasies. It was said to be a "breath of fresh air" by most fans and received excellent reviews worldwide when it was released. It is regarded by a large part of TNT's fanbase to be their best album ever, including more known albums such as Tell No Tales and Intuition. Sid Ringsby joined the band to finish the rest of the touring for My Religion and to record the follow-up album, All The Way to the Sun.

This was the final TNT album on which Morty Black played the bass guitar. He left in late 2004 to join Åge Aleksandersen's band.

== Track listing ==
No.	Title	Writer(s)	Length
1.	"Invisible Noise"	Tony Harnell, Ronni Le Tekrø	4:07
2.	"She Needs Me"	Tony Harnell, Ronni Le Tekrø	3:16
3.	"Lonely Nights"	Tony Harnell, Ronni Le Tekrø, Amy Anderson	3:57
4.	"My Religion"	Tony Harnell, Ronni Le Tekrø	3:37
5.	"Give Me a Sign"	Tony Harnell, Ronni Le Tekrø	4:22
6.	"Perfectly"	Tony Harnell, Ronni Le Tekrø	5:15
7.	"You'll Be There"	Tony Harnell, Ronni Le Tekrø	3:33
8.	"Flow" (instrumental)	Tony Harnell, Ronni Le Tekrø	0:52
9.	"Live Today"	Tony Harnell, Ronni Le Tekrø	3:40
10.	"Everybody's Got a Secret"	Tony Harnell, Ronni Le Tekrø	3:52
11.	"Everything U R"	Tony Harnell, Ronni Le Tekrø	3:53
12.	"Song 4 Dianne"	Tony Harnell, Ronni Le Tekrø	3:44
13.	"The Last Word" (instrumental)	Tony Harnell, Ronni Le Tekrø	0:42
14.	"When I'm Away" (Japanese Bonus Track)	Tony Harnell, Ronni Le Tekrø	2:58

== Personnel ==
=== Band ===
- Tony Harnell – vocals
- Ronni Le Tekrø – guitars
- Morty Black – bass guitar
- Diesel Dahl – drums, percussion

=== Additional personnel ===
- Dag Stokke – keyboards
- Amy Anderson – background vocals, recorder

== Album credits ==
- Produced by Tony Harnell and Ronni Le Tekrø

== Sources ==
- http://www.ronniletekro.com/discography-album-23.html
