= Live in Madrid (TNT album) =

Live album by TNT
- Released: 27 November 2006
- Recorded: 1 April 2006
- Genre: Hard rock, heavy metal
- Label: MTM

TNT chronology
All the Way to the Sun (2005)	Live in Madrid (2006)	The New Territory (2007)

Live In Madrid is a live CD + DVD package by the Norwegian rock band TNT. It was the last TNT album recorded with vocalist Tony Harnell, who left the band in 2006.

== Track listing – CD / DVD ==
1. "Invisible Noise"
2. "As Far as the Eye Can See"
3. "Downhill Racer"
4. "A Fix"
5. "She Needs Me"
6. "Give Me a Sign"
7. Guitar Solo
8. "Caught Between the Tigers"
9. "Listen to Your Heart"
10. "Black Butterfly"
11. "Seven Seas"
12. "Forever Shine On"
13. "Fantasia Española"
14. "My Religion"
15. "10,000 Lovers (In One)"
16. "Intuition"

=== Bonus material on DVD ===
- "Everyone's a Star" (live at Sweden Rock Festival 2004)
- Autograph session at the Deep Impact Festival (2004)
- "She Needs Me" (live at Rockefeller Music Hall in Oslo 2004)

== Personnel ==
TNT

- Tony Harnell – vocals
- Ronni Le Tekrø – guitars, background vocals
- Victor Borge – bass guitar, background vocals
- Diesel Dahl – drums, percussion

Additional personnel

- Dag Stokke – keyboards, background vocals

== Sources ==
- http://www.melodic.net/newsOne.asp?newsId=6470
