= Darren Paltrowitz =

- Born: March 1, 1982 (age 44); Oceanside, Long Island, New York, U.S.
- Education: Hofstra University (Undergraduate) University of Southern Mississippi-Hattiesburg (Graduate) John F. Kennedy High School (High School)

Darren Paltrowitz is an American author, host, librarian and licensed investigator with experience in the entertainment industry.

== Early life ==
He started contributing to various local publications such as Long Island Entertainment and Under The Volcano, later working in artist management within the music industry and becoming Editor-in-Chief of Long Island Entertainment, Music Editor of The Improper Magazine and Digital Managing Editor of Downtown Magazine.

Paltrowitz attended Hofstra University for his undergraduate studies and later pursued a Masters Program at the University of Southern Mississippi-Hattiesburg.

Paltrowitz is a interviewer and host and currently hosts the weekly Paltrocast With Darren Paltrowitz series, which started in 2018 as a podcast before becoming a TV series in 2020. The theme song to the series was composed by Paltrowitz with producer and Longwave singer Steve Schiltz. The series won the "Best Use of Streaming Services- All Platforms" honor from the 2025 Press Club of Long Island Media Awards in June 2025 and a "Best Talk Show" honor from Feedspot in November 2025.

Paltrowitz has written several books, including Pocket Cash: Your Happy Money co-written by Dr. Jeri Fink and Donna Paltrowitz, which was published in 2018. In 2019, he co-wrote Good Advice From Professional Wrestling: Full Contact Life Lessons with D.X. Ferris. His third book DLR Book: How David Lee Roth Changed The World was released in January 2024 via Backbeat Books, as featuring contributions from WWE Hall Of Famer Diamond Dallas Page and Lit bassist Kevin Baldes. Within the week of its release, the book reached the #1 spot on several Amazon sales charts.

== Career ==
Paltrowitz's writing has also been featured in a number of publications, including the Los Angeles Times, New York Daily News, Chicago Tribune, All Music Guide, Yahoo! News and Jewish Journal. His "Paltrocast with Darren Paltrowitz" series airs regularly via over 150 television stations and OTT carriers, including channels based in New York, Minneapolis, Denver, Tampa, San Jose, Portland and the greater Boston, Los Angeles and Salt Lake City markets. He also co-hosts a separate podcast about Van Halen singer David Lee Roth, The DLR Cast. He and his wife Melissa are also known for their Paltrobox series in which they unbox products from top brands.

Many of his interviews have uncovered exclusives about new projects and artist career goals, including Thin Lizzy guitarist Scott Gorham nearly dying during a recent surgery, Superdrag singer John Davis having written 10 songs for a forthcoming reunion album, Judas Priest singer Rob Halford's interest in recording a blues album, WWE wrestler Eva Marie's first starring movie role, Kip Winger's intentions to end the band Winger as a touring entity, Eddie Van Halen almost having a cameo in the third Bill & Ted movie, Alan Angels signing with IMPACT Wrestling, the band Kansas' enjoyment of AEW stars The Young Bucks' use of "Carry On My Wayward Son," Ratt singer Stephen Pearcy's plans to write another book, Motley Crue's Tommy Lee having a Starbucks franchise, Def Leppard's Rick Allen having a friendship with Wolfgang Van Halen, Ice-T explaining how he often writes lyrics, and Chris Jericho's recovery from a throat-related injury.

Since the release of DLR Book, Paltrowitz has contributed to a variety of books, academic journals, and international conferences. He has moderated, created content for and/or hosted events at Carnegie Hall, Fotografiska New York, Virginia Commonwealth University, Purdue University, Shenandoah University, and the London Arts Based Research Centre.

== Books ==
- Pocket Cash: Your Happy Money co-written by Dr. Jeri Fink and Donna Paltrowitz (2018, Book Web Publishing)
- Good Advice From Professional Wrestling: Full Contact Life Lessons co-written by D.X. Ferris (2019, 6623 Press)
- DLR Book: How David Lee Roth Changed the World (2024, Backbeat Books)
