= All the Way to the Sun =

Studio album by TNT
- Released: 21 October 2005 (Japan); 8 November 2005
- Genre: Hard rock
- Label: MTM
- Producer: Tony Harnell, Ronni Le Tekrø

TNT chronology
My Religion (2004)	All the Way to the Sun (2005)	Live in Madrid (2006)

Professional ratings
Review scores
Source	Rating
AllMusic	3.5/5 stars

All the Way to the Sun is the ninth studio album by the Norwegian rock band TNT, first released on 21 October 2005. The album was first rumoured to be on the heavier side of TNT but came out in the end as a more straight-forward pop rock album. The album received generally positive reviews, but not as many as their previous album, My Religion. It also sold less than the previous album. The band toured Norway to support the release, as well as shows in Sweden, the UK, and in Spain, where they recorded what became Live in Madrid. This was the last studio album with longtime vocalist Tony Harnell, before he left the band for professional and personal reasons. "Driving" has been played before several major car races in the USA.

== Track listing ==
1. "A Fix" – 4:04
2. "Too Late" – 3:46
3. "Driving" – 4:05
4. "Me and I" – 3:43
5. "Sometimes" – 4:09
6. "All the Way to the Sun" – 5:04
7. "What a Wonderful World" – 3:04
8. "The Letter" – 4:02
9. "Mastic Pines" – 1:25
10. "Black Butterfly" – 2:59
11. "Save Your Love" – 3:58
12. "Ready to Fly" – 4:36
13. "Get What You Give" – 4:36 (Japan bonus track)

== Personnel ==
TNT

- Tony Harnell – vocals
- Ronni Le Tekrø – guitars, backing vocals on "Save Your Love"
- Diesel Dahl – drums, percussion

Associated members

- Sid Ringsby – bass guitar
- Dag Stokke – keyboards

Additional personnel

- Bruno Ravel – additional background vocals on "Me and I"
- Amy Anderson-Harnell – additional background vocals on "Me and I"

== Album credits ==
- Produced by Tony Harnell and Ronni Le Tekrø
- Engineered by Kjartan Hesthagen
- Mastering & mixing by Tommy Hansen

== Sources ==
- http://www.ronniletekro.com/discography-album-27.html
