= Dag Stokke =

Norwegian musician

- Born: 1 April 1967; Gjøvik, Oppland
- Origin: Norway
- Died: 27 April 2011 (aged 44)
- Genres: Hard rock, glam metal
- Occupations: Musician, sound engineer
- Instruments: keyboards, church organ, piano, accordion
- Years active: 1987–2011
- Website: hi.im/dag

Dag Stokke (1 April 1967 – 27 April 2011) was a Norwegian keyboardist, church organist and mastering engineer best known for his work with the Norwegian rock bands TNT and Vagabond. He owned an online mastering service called OnlineMastering.

== Career ==
Stokke was TNT's live keyboardist from April 1987 to 2011 and played on every TNT album from Realized Fantasies (1992) to A Farewell to Arms (2010). However, he was never a permanent TNT member. "I'm cool with my position in TNT," he said in a 2010 interview, "Some people ask me why I'm not in the pictures and why I'm not profiled. That's just the way it is, and I'm completely laidback with that. I got to experience the rockstar existence so much in 1987 and especially in 1989 and a little bit into 1992, so that dream has been realized. If I'm not upfront, that's totally cool, because I know I've been a part of all this." He played his last concert with TNT in Umeå, Sweden on 5 March 2011.

In January 2011 he found out he had cancer. Stokke died on 27 April 2011 at the age of 44. He is survived by a son.

== Discography ==
=== TNT ===
- Realized Fantasies (1992)
- Three Nights in Tokyo (1992)
- Firefly (1997)
- Transistor (1999)
- My Religion (2004)
- All the Way to the Sun (2005)
- Live in Madrid (2006)
- The New Territory (2007)
- Atlantis (2008)
- A Farewell to Arms (2010)

=== Vagabond ===
- Vagabond (1994)
- A Huge Fan of Life (1995)

=== Other artists ===
- Jorn - Starfire (2000)
- Unni Wilhelmsen - Disconnected (2001)
- Kristin Sevaldsen - Impressions (2007)
- Arnstein Hammershaug - Langsomme dager (2009)
- Kristin Sevaldsen and Lewi Bergrud - Treasure (2009)
