= Atlantis (TNT album) =

2008 album by TNT

Studio album by TNT
- Released: 22 September 2008
- Recorded: 2008
- Genre: Hard rock
- Label: Bonnier Amigo

TNT chronology
The New Territory (2007)	Atlantis (2008)	A Farewell to Arms / Engine (2010)

Atlantis is the eleventh studio album by Norwegian rock band TNT. It was released on 22 September 2008.

== Reception ==
The album was much more well received than The New Territory, with many Norwegian outlets giving it 5 or 6 out of 6, European metal review site Hard Rock Haven giving it 8.1/10. However, Melodic Rock gave it a significantly less enthusiastic review of 69%, though the reviewer did state it was better than The New Territory. German newspaper reviews have been detracting.

== Track listing ==
1. "Hello, Hello" (Ronni Le Tekro, Tony Mills, Erland Hvalby) – 4:03
2. "Peter Sellers Blues" – 4:45
3. "Baby's Got Rhythm" – 3:39
4. "Tango Girl" (Tekro) – 4:08
5. "Me and Dad" – 7:52
6. "Atlantis" – 4:09
7. "The Taste of Honey" (Mills, Tekro, Persen) – 3:42
8. "Bottle of Wine" – 3:17
9. "The Missing Kind" – 4:07
10. "Love of My Life" – 3:14
11. "Had it, Lost it, Found it" – 4:55

Bonus tracks

- "June" (live in 2007 – bonus track on Japanese edition)
- "Substitute" (live in 2007 – bonus track on European edition)

== Personnel ==
- Tony Mills – lead and harmony vocals
- Ronni Le Tekrø – guitars, backing vocals, sitar on "Baby's Got Rhythm"
- Victor Borge – bass guitar, backing vocals
- Diesel Dahl – drums and percussion

Additional personnel

- Mari Persen – violin and violin arrangements on 7
- Markus Klyve – keyboards on 4, 7, 9
- Tony Caputo – organ on 3
- Jon Johannessen – additional twang guitar on 3
- Heidi Ruud, Renate Helland – additional backing vocals on 8
- HP-Gundersen – slide and additional backing vocals on 4, piano on 3, 11
- Erland Hvalby – synthesizer on 1, castanets on 4
- Dag Stokke – keyboards
- Tommy Hansen – mixing
