= The New Territory =

Studio album by TNT
- Released: 7 May 2007 (Scandinavia)
- Recorded: 2007
- Genre: Hard rock
- Label: Bonnier Amigo

TNT chronology
Live in Madrid (2006)	The New Territory (2007)	Atlantis (2008)

The New Territory is the tenth studio album by the Norwegian rock band TNT, and was released on 30 June 2007. It is their first album with Tony Mills on vocals.

== Track listing ==
1. "A Constitution" (Ronni Le Tekrø, Tony Mills, Diesel Dahl) – 4:16
2. "Substitute" (Tekrø, Mills, Dahl) – 2:42
3. "Are You Blind?"(Gundersen, Mills, Tekro) – 3:50
4. "Golden Opportunity" (Gundersen, Mills, Tekrø) – 3:29
5. "Something Special" (Gundersen, Tekrø, Mills) – 3:22
6. "Now We're Talkin'" (Tekrø) – 3:36
7. "Wild Life" (Mills, Tekrø, Dahl) – 3:07
8. "Fountain of Love" (Tekrø) – 4:25
9. "June" (Mills, Tekrø) – 3:28
10. "Can't Go On Without" (Mills, Gundersen, Tekrø) – 3:15
11. "2 Seconds Away"(Dahl, Mills, Tekro) – 3:19
12. "Milestone River" (Tekro, Caputo, Hvalby, Johannsen) – 4:51
13. "Let's Party Mills" (closing track) – 2:11

=== Bonus tracks on Japanese edition ===
1. "Harley-Davidson" [new version] (Ingebrigtsen, Tekrø, Alfheim, Mills)
2. "Don't Come Too Near" (Tekrø)

== Personnel ==
TNT

- Tony Mills – vocals, harmony vocals
- Ronni Le Tekrø – guitars, baritone backing vocals
- Victor Borge – bass guitar, backing vocals
- Diesel Dahl – drums

Additional personnel

- Dag Stokke – keyboards, backing vocals, mixing
- Tony Caputo – backing guitar on track 12
- Jon Johannsen – keyboards on track 12
