= XIII (TNT album) =

Studio album by TNT
- Released: 6 June 2018 (Japan); 8 June 2018 (Norway)
- Genre: Hard rock
- Length: 46:23
- Label: Frontiers Music Srl

TNT chronology
A Farewell to Arms / Engine (2010)	XIII (2018)

XIII is the thirteenth studio album by the Norwegian hard rock band TNT, released on 8 June 2018. It is the first and only TNT album with the band's fourth lead vocalist Baol Bardot Bulsara, who officially joined in November 2017.

== Track listing ==
No.	Title	Length
1.	"We're Gonna Make It"	4:11
2.	"Not Feeling Anything"	2:23
3.	"Fair Warning"	3:09
4.	"It's Electric"	3:14
5.	"Where You Belong"	4:50
6.	"Can't Breathe Anymore"	3:50
7.	"Get Ready for Some Hard Rock"	2:56
8.	"People, Come Together"	3:40
9.	"Tears in My Eyes"	4:26
10.	"17th of May"	3:17
11.	"Catch a Wave"	4:32
12.	"Sunshine"	5:55

Japanese edition
No.	Title	Length
13.	"We're Gonna Make It" (Different mix)

== Personnel ==
TNT

- Baol Bardot Bulsara – lead vocals
- Ronni Le Tekrø – guitars
- Ove Husemoen – bass
- Diesel Dahl – drums

== Charts ==
Chart (2018)	Peak position
Norwegian Albums (VG-lista)	10
