= Firefly (TNT album) =

Studio album by TNT
- Released: 10 January 1997 (Norway); 5 February 1997 (Japan)
- Recorded: Studio Studio, Norway
- Genre: Hard rock, alternative rock
- Length: 51:26
- Label: Norske Gram, Victor Entertainment
- Producer: TNT

TNT chronology
Till Next Time – The Best of TNT (1996)	Firefly (1997)	Firefly and Live! (1997)

Firefly is the sixth studio album by the Norwegian rock band TNT, released in 1997.

The album was a comeback for TNT, who split up in 1992 after the release of Realized Fantasies. It also marked a significant change in TNT's sound; the music is heavier and more modern, reflecting the changes in the music industry in the first half of the 1990s. It is also Tony Harnell's favorite album. When singer Tony Mills joined in 2007, he was told by Le Tekrø to not even bother listening to it as they wouldn't play anything from the album live.

The album was not as successful as some of TNT's previous albums, but still achieved some success in Norway and Japan. The band toured those countries in support of the album.

== Track listing ==
No.	Title	Writer(s)	Length
1.	"Firefly"	Ronni Le Tekrø, Tony Harnell, Morty Black	4:27
2.	"Angels Ride"	Ronni Le Tekrø, Tony Harnell	4:26
3.	"Trippin'"	Ronni Le Tekrø, Tony Harnell	4:39
4.	"Daisy Jane"	Ronni Le Tekrø, Tony Harnell	4:42
5.	"Somebody Told You"	Ronni Le Tekrø, Tony Harnell	3:56
6.	"Month of Sundays"	Ronni Le Tekrø, Tony Harnell	3:59
7.	"Only the Thief (Whistles at Night)"	Ronni Le Tekrø, Tony Harnell	2:11
8.	"Heaven's Gone"	Ronni Le Tekrø, Tony Harnell	4:09
9.	"Moonflower"	Ronni Le Tekrø, Tony Harnell, Embee Normann	4:47
10.	"Sunless Star"	Ronni Le Tekrø, Tony Harnell, Morty Black	4:58
11.	"Cool It"	Ronni Le Tekrø	3:40
12.	"Soldier of the Light"	Ronni Le Tekrø, Tony Harnell	5:26

The song "Soldier of the Light" was never meant for the album. It was a demo from the Realized Fantasies sessions but was put on Firefly because the Japanese record company liked it so much.

They opened their live shows with "Only the Thief" as an intro before launching into "Somebody Told You" with Tony Harnell doing the first lines of the song's lyrics before Le Tekrø opened with the song's riff.

It's rumoured that the vocals for "Heaven's Gone" is "off beat" or "not in tempo" with the song as they had originally planned it.

"Angels Ride" has been reported as one of Tony Harnell's favorite TNT songs.

== Personnel ==
TNT

- Tony Harnell – vocals
- Ronni Le Tekrø – guitars, lead vocals on "Moonflower"
- Morty Black – bass guitar

Associated members

- Dag Stokke – keyboards
- Frode Lamøy – drums, percussion (credited as Frode Hansen)

Additional personnel

- Embee Normann – flute, background vocals on "Moonflower"
- John Macaluso – drums, percussion on "Soldier of the Light"

== Album credits ==
- Produced by TNT
- "Soldier of the Light" produced by Bob Icon
- Recorded in StudioStudio, Norway
- Engineered by Dag Stokke
- Second engineers: Kjartan Hesthagen, Erland Hvalby, Ronni Le Tekrø
- Programming assistance: Dag Overlie
- "Only the Thief" was recorded outdoors on alternative instruments
- Vocals for "Heaven's Gone" recorded at Millbrook Sound Studios, NY, by Paul Orofino
- Mixed and mastered by Chris Tsangarides
- Morty now uses handmade Listerud basses
- All amps Ampeg
- Vocal effects on "Firefly" and "Sunless Star" created with guitar pedals hooked up to microphone

== Sources ==
- https://web.archive.org/web/20070213021031/http://www.ronniletekro.com/discography-album-19.html
