= Morten Skogstad =

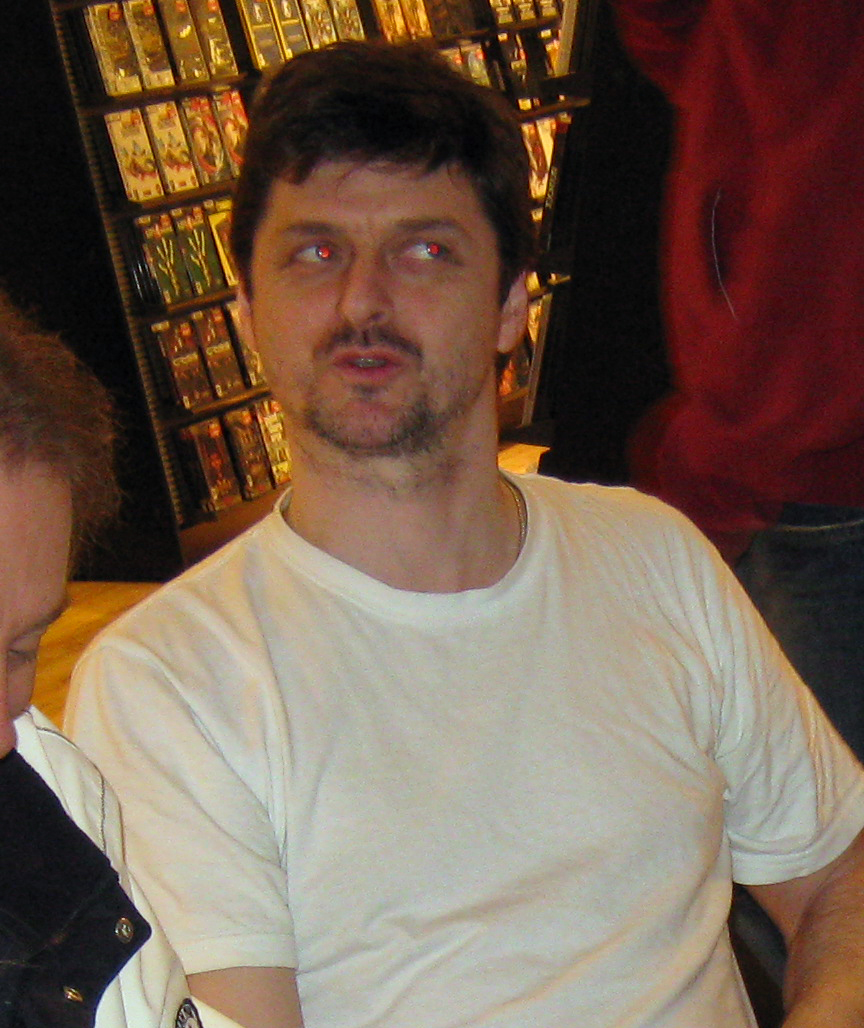

Background information
- Also known as: Kenneth Odiin
- Born: 26 June 1962 (age 62); Trondheim, Norway
- Genres: Hard rock, Glam metal
- Instrument: Drums
- Years active: 1988–present

Morten Skogstad (born 26 June 1962) is the drummer in the Norwegian hard rock/glam metal band Stage Dolls. He joined the band in 1993, replacing Steinar Krokstad.

Skogstad was the drummer in the Norwegian hard rock band TNT from 1988 to 1989. During his tenure in TNT, he used the stage name Kenneth Odiin.

== Discography ==
=== TNT ===
- Intuition (1989)

=== Stage Dolls ===
- Dig (1997)
- Get a Life (2004)
- Get a Live (2005) - live CD + bonus DVD
- Always (2010)
