= Intuition (TNT album) =

Studio album by TNT
- Released: 21 February 1989
- Recorded: NBL Studios, Trondheim
- Genre: Hard rock, glam metal
- Length: 36:53
- Label: PolyGram
- Producer: Bjørn Nessjø

TNT chronology
Tell No Tales (1987)	Intuition (1989)	Realized Fantasies (1992)

Professional ratings
Review scores
Source	Rating
AllMusic	link

Intuition is the fourth studio album by the Norwegian rock band TNT. The sound of the album was more commercial than on their previous albums. It is one of their most successful albums so far. Swedish metal band Dragonland covered the album's title track on their album Astronomy. The CD was reissued by Rock Candy Records in February 2022

== Track listing ==
No.	Title	Writer(s)	Length
1.	"A Nation Free (Intro)"	Tony Harnell, Ronni Le Tekrø	1:14
2.	"Caught Between the Tigers"	Harnell, Le Tekrø	4:16
3.	"Tonight I'm Falling"	Harnell, Le Tekrø	3:55
4.	"End of the Line"	Harnell, Le Tekrø	4:21
5.	"Intuition"	Harnell, Le Tekrø	4:18
6.	"Forever Shine On"	Harnell, Le Tekrø, Morty Black	4:46
7.	"Learn to Love"	Harnell, Le Tekrø	3:37
8.	"Ordinary Lover"	Harnell, Le Tekrø	0:53
9.	"Take Me Down (Fallen Angel)"	Harnell, Le Tekrø	4:28
10.	"Wisdom"	Harnell, Le Tekrø	5:05

Japanese first-print bonus track (on 28PD-578)
No.	Title	Writer(s)	Length
11.	"Electric Dancer"	Harnell, Le Tekrø	4:36

== Personnel ==
=== Band ===
- Tony Harnell – vocals
- Ronni Le Tekrø – guitars, 1/4 stepper guitar, lead vocals on "Ordinary Lover"
- Morty Black – bass guitar, pedal synthesizer, fretless bass with reverb and chorus effect on "Forever Shine On"
- Kenneth Odiin – drums, percussion

=== Additional personnel ===
- Kjetil Bjerkestrand – keyboards
- Joe Lynn Turner – background vocals

== Chart ==
=== Album ===
Year	Country	Position
1989	Norway	3
1989	Sweden	19
1989	United States	115

=== Singles ===
Year	Single	Chart	Position
1989	Intuition	Norway	5
1989	Tonight I'm Falling	Norway	12

== Album credits ==
- Bjørn Nessjø – producer
- Rune Nordahl – engineer

== Sources ==
- http://www.ronniletekro.com/discography-album-11.html
