= 10,000 Lovers (In One) =

Single by TNT

from the album Tell No Tales
- B-side: "Desperate Night"
- Released: 1987
- Genre: Glam metal
- Length: 2:53
- Label: Vertigo
- Songwriter(s): Tony Harnell, Ronni Le Tekrø, Diesel Dahl
- Producer(s): Bjørn Nessjø

TNT singles chronology
"'Everyone's a Star'" (1987)	"10,000 Lovers (In One)" (1987)	"'Intuition'" (1989)

"10,000 Lovers (In One)" is a hit single by the Norwegian band TNT, taken from their 1987 album, Tell No Tales. It was written about a girl who TNT's vocalist at that time, Tony Harnell, knew. The single reached the Billboard Hot 100 chart in America, peaking at number 100 and earned the band a Spellemannprisen.

In 2006 TNT recorded a new version of the song together with the Norwegian rapper Vinni from the band Paperboys. This version included newly written and controversial rap lyrics, which fueled Harnell to make a statement.

Vinni joined TNT for a couple of performances of the new version in concerts and on national TV shows. It was scheduled to be included on a compilation of Norwegian hits, but it was cancelled due to unknown problems.

== Music videos ==
There are two different music videos for the song. Apparently the band wasn't satisfied with the first video, jokingly referred to as "pølsevideoen" (the sausage video), so they went to London and recorded a new video there. Both videos are included on the TNT DVD The Collection: Volume 1.

== Charts ==
Chart (1987)	Peak position
Norway (VG-lista)	2
US Billboard Hot 100	100

== Personnel ==
=== Band ===
- Tony Harnell - Vocals
- Ronni Le Tekrø - Guitars, guitar synthesizer
- Morty Black - Bass guitar, pedal synthesizer
- Diesel Dahl - Drums, percussion
