= Realized Fantasies =

Studio album by TNT
- Released: 25 May 1992 (Japan)
- Recorded: Cove City Sound Studios, Long Island, New York
- Genre: Hard rock, glam metal
- Length: 50:26
- Label: Atlantic
- Producer: Ric Wake

TNT chronology
Intuition (1989)	Realized Fantasies (1992)	Three Nights in Tokyo (1992)

Professional ratings
Review scores
Source	Rating
AllMusic	link

Realized Fantasies is the fifth studio album by the Norwegian rock band TNT.

== Track listing ==
No.	Title	Writer(s)	Length
1.	"Downhill Racer"	Ronni Le Tekrø, Tony Harnell, Morty Black	4:48
2.	"Hard to Say Goodbye"	Ronni Le Tekrø, Tony Harnell	5:12
3.	"Mother Warned Me"	Ronni Le Tekrø, Tony Harnell, Del James	4:43
4.	"Lionheart"	Ronni Le Tekrø, Tony Harnell, Del James	4:49
5.	"Rain"	Ronni Le Tekrø, Tony Harnell	4:30
6.	"Purple Mountain's Majesty"	Ronni Le Tekrø, Tony Harnell, Dag Stokke	6:14
7.	"Rock n' Roll Away"	Ronni Le Tekrø, Tony Harnell, Del James	5:51
8.	"Easy Street"	Ronni Le Tekrø, Tony Harnell, Borge Pedersen, Del James, Bobby Icon	4:58
9.	"All You Need"	Ronni Le Tekrø, Tony Harnell, Morty Black	4:21
10.	"Indian Summer"	Ronni Le Tekrø, Tony Harnell	5:00

== Personnel ==
TNT

- Tony Harnell – vocals
- Ronni Le Tekrø – guitars, keyboards, 1/4 stepper guitar
- Morty Black – bass guitar
- John Macaluso – drums, percussion

Additional personnel

- Joe Lynn Turner – background vocals
- Dag Stokke – keyboards on track 6
- Rich Tancredi – keyboards
- T.J. Kopetic – keyboards
- Peter Wood – piano on "Easy Street"
- Kyf Brewer – harp on "All You Need"

== Chart ==
=== Album ===
Year	Country	Position
1992	Norway	5
1992	Sweden	44

=== Singles ===
Year	Single	Chart	Position
1992	Rain	Norway	-

== Album credits ==
- Ric Wake – producer
- Gary Lyons – mixing

== Sources ==
- http://www.ronniletekro.com/discography-album-12.html
