= Diesel Dahl =

Norwegian drummer

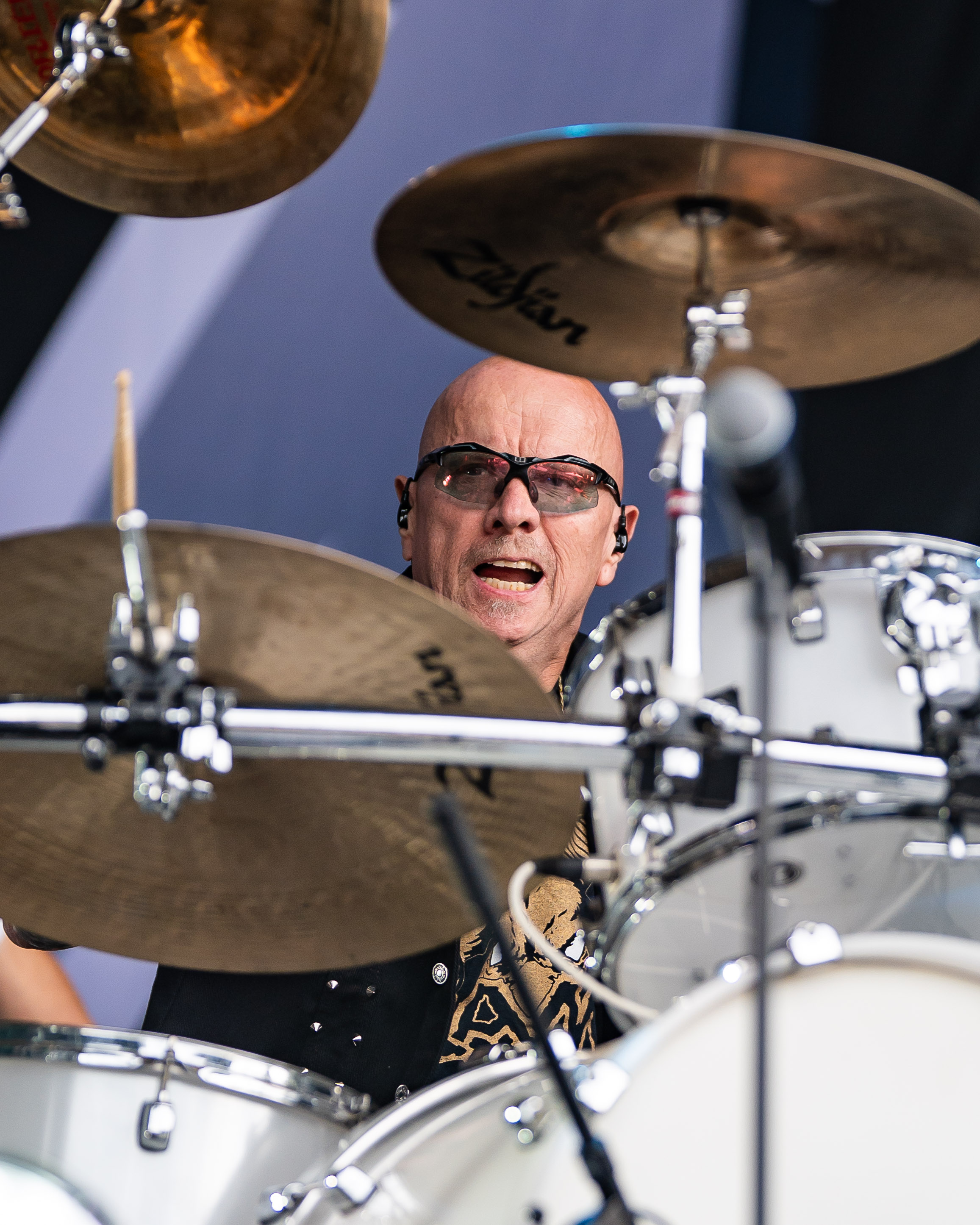
- Dahl in 2025

Background information
- Born: Morten Dahl; 19 June 1959 (age 67); Trondheim, Norway
- Genres: Hard rock, glam metal, heavy metal
- Occupation: Drummer
- Years active: 1982–present
- Member of: TNT
- Formerly of: TinDrum

Morten "Diesel" Dahl (born 19 June 1959) is a Norwegian musician. He is the drummer and a founding member of the hard rock band TNT.

He started playing the drums at the age of 15, and played in bands like Burn, Edge and Hotlips before he formed TNT together with vocalist Dag Ingebrigtsen in 1982. Dahl played on the first three TNT albums and co-wrote their biggest hit, "10,000 Lovers (In One)", before he parted ways with the band in the fall of 1987. The following year he formed the band TinDrum, which had a number 1 hit in Norway with "Drums of War".

In the early 1990s Dahl joined the local Hells Angels motorcycle club in Trondheim and became a spokesperson for the chapter. Throughout the 1990s he played in various bands, such as Diesel Dahl & Friends and Diezel, before he officially reunited with TNT in 2000. He left Hells Angels in 2005.

His daughter Carina Dahl is a singer.

== Discography ==
=== TNT ===
- TNT (1982)
- Knights of the New Thunder (1984)
- Tell No Tales (1987)
- Give me a Sign EP (2003)
- My Religion (2004)
- All the Way to the Sun (2005)
- Live in Madrid (2006)
- The New Territory (2007)
- Atlantis (2008)
- A Farewell to Arms (2010)
- XIII (2018)

=== TinDrum ===
- Drums of War (1988)
- How About This?! (1989)
- Cool, Calm & Collected (1990)

=== Diezel ===
- Willpower (1995)

=== Diesel Dahl & Friends ===
- reCYCLEd (1997)
- Happy Birthday Harley Davidson: Tribute To A Legend (2003)

== Sources ==
- dieseldahl.com
