= TNT (Norwegian band) =

Norwegian rock band

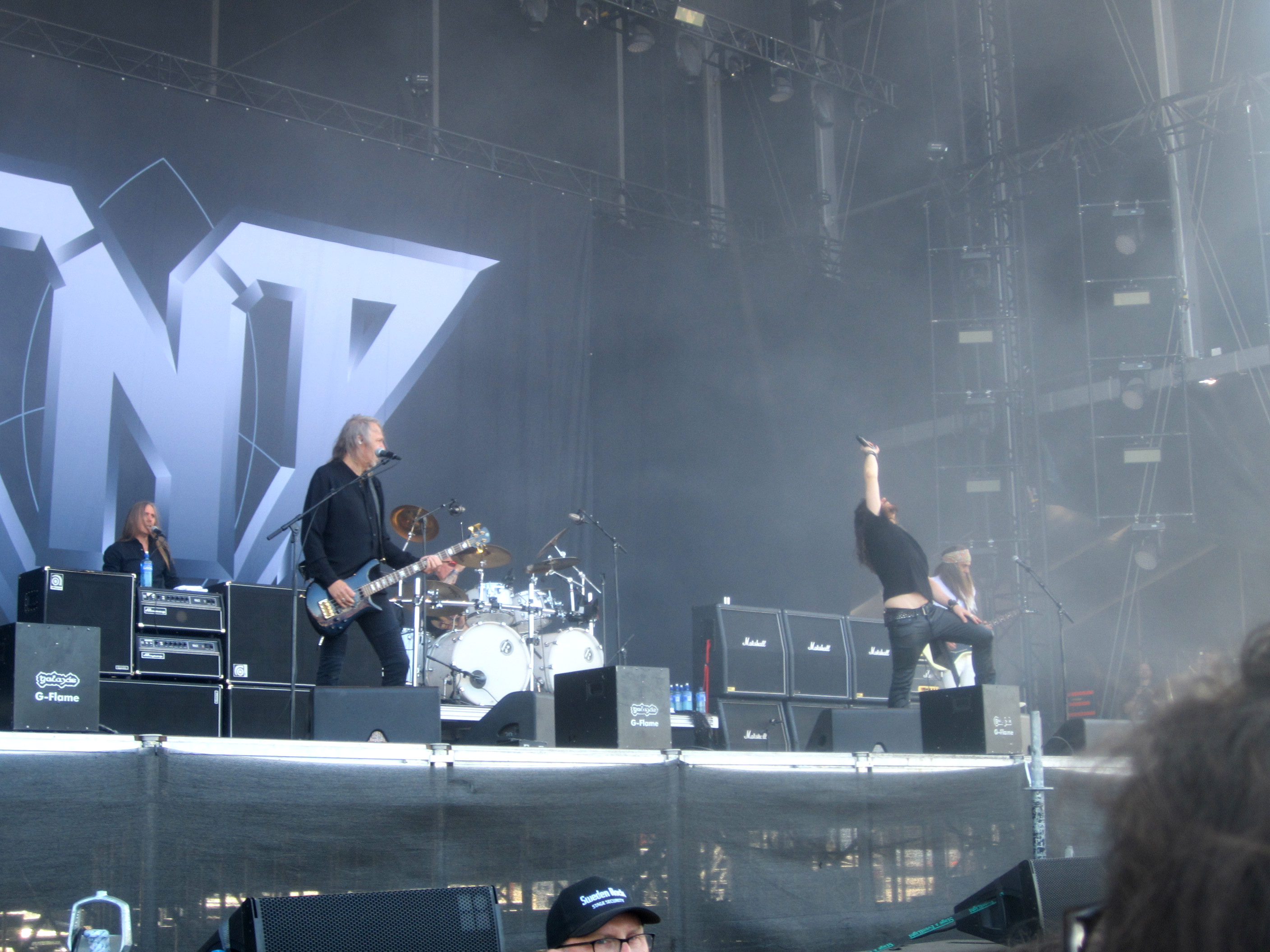
- TNT at Sweden Rock Festival 2023

Background information
- Origin: Trondheim, Norway
- Genres: Hard rock; glam metal; heavy metal
- Years active: 1982–1992; 1996–present
- Labels: Vertigo; Spitfire
- Members: Ronni Le Tekrø; Diesel Dahl; Tony Harnell; Sid Ringsby
- Past members: Dag Ingebrigtsen; Steinar Eikum; Morty Black; Kenneth Odiin; John Macaluso; Victor Borge; Tony Mills; Ove Husemoen; Baol Bardot Bulsara
- Website: tnttheband.com

TNT is a Norwegian hard rock band from Trondheim, formed in 1982. The band has released fourteen studio albums, three EPs and four live albums while going through numerous lineup changes since its formation. Guitarist Ronni Le Tekrø is the only consistent member of the band. TNT has sold between 4–5 million albums worldwide as of 2016.

== History ==
=== 1980s and 1990s ===
TNT was formed in the Norwegian city of Trondheim in 1982, by vocalist and rhythm guitarist Dag Ingebrigtsen, guitarist Ronni Le Tekrø, bassist Steinar Eikum and drummer Diesel Dahl. Securing a national record contract with PolyGram subsidiary Vertigo Norway, they released their self-titled debut album the same year — their only album that features Norwegian lyrics — and got a hit with the single "Harley-Davidson". In August 1983 bassist Morty Black replaced Eikum, and the following year American vocalist Tony Harnell replaced Ingebrigtsen, making his debut on TNT's second album, Knights of the New Thunder. His unique and powerful 4 octave range was the final element the band needed to break out of Norway and into the world market. The album was a huge success in Scandinavia and the band then was offered a worldwide deal with Mercury/Polygram worldwide out of New York. Knights of the New Thunder was then released in the U.S. in 1984 and the video for "Seven Seas" got heavy rotation on MTV and the album entered the billboard charts.

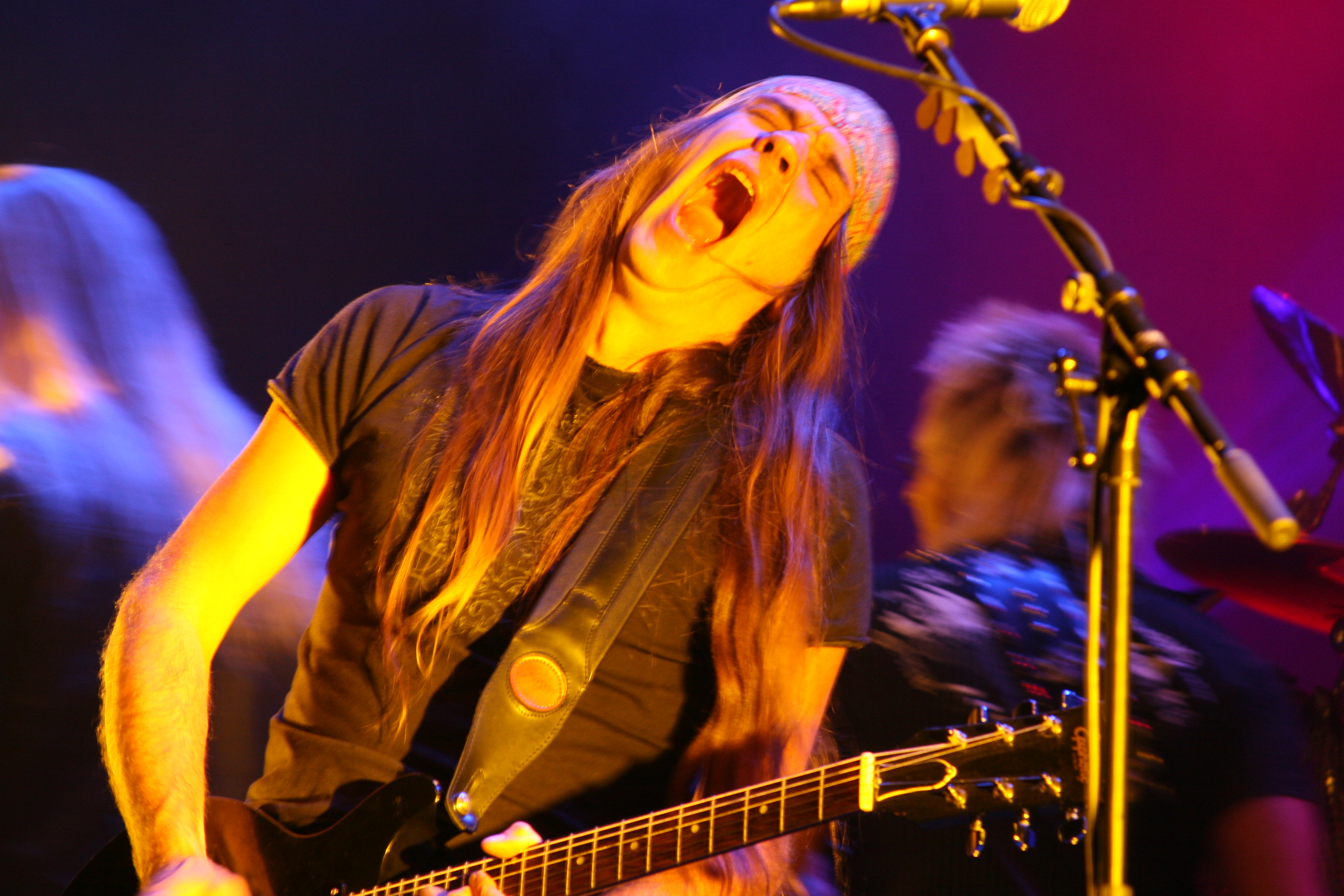
Ronni Le Tekrø

TNT's third album, Tell No Tales, was released in 1987 and produced the band's biggest hit, the single "10,000 Lovers (In One)". Tell No Tales marked a slight change in sound from melodic Euro-metal to a more palatable hard rock style, with Le Tekrø and Harnell gaining a reputation as a talented duo. The album was the best selling release in Norway and Sweden that year (outselling hugely popular artists like Michael Jackson and Def Leppard). Tell No Tales also saw the band establishing a mainstream following in Japan and the U.S. Promotional Videos for "Everyone's a Star" and "10,000 Lovers (In One)" were featured on both European and American MTV. They were also featured on Headbangers Ball. The band supported Stryper on a sold-out arena tour in the U.S. followed by a tour with Twisted Sister and Great White as well as headlining shows in large clubs in the U.S.. In the fall of 1987 Diesel Dahl parted ways with TNT due to personal and professional differences and made his last public appearance with the band at the Spellemannprisen awards in January 1988, where TNT received the Best Rock Album award for Tell No Tales.

Kenneth Odiin became TNT's new drummer and played on TNT's fourth studio album, Intuition, which was released in 1989. This release marked a more AOR-oriented sound, still maintaining a little of the hard rock edge of the previous album. Intuition was another huge success in Scandinavia and Japan. It was also the band's best received American release and saw the band embarking on their first headlining tour of the U.S. which broke attendance records across the country in small theaters and large clubs, thanks to the prominent display of the video for the title track on MTV.

After the Intuition tour, Odiin left the band and was replaced by John Macaluso. The band negotiated a new (and generous) record contract with Atlantic Records, and released the studio album Realized Fantasies and the live recording Three Nights in Tokyo, both in 1992. However, Atlantic did a poor job of promoting the album in the States (assuring that TNT would never find huge success in America) and also the rest of the world. The same year they decided to take a break, choosing to focus on various solo projects. In 1996 the compilation Till Next Time – The Best of TNT was released, and Harnell, Le Tekrø and Black reformed TNT with session drummer Frode Lamøy. That lineup recorded two albums, Firefly in 1997 and Transistor in 1999.

=== 2000s ===
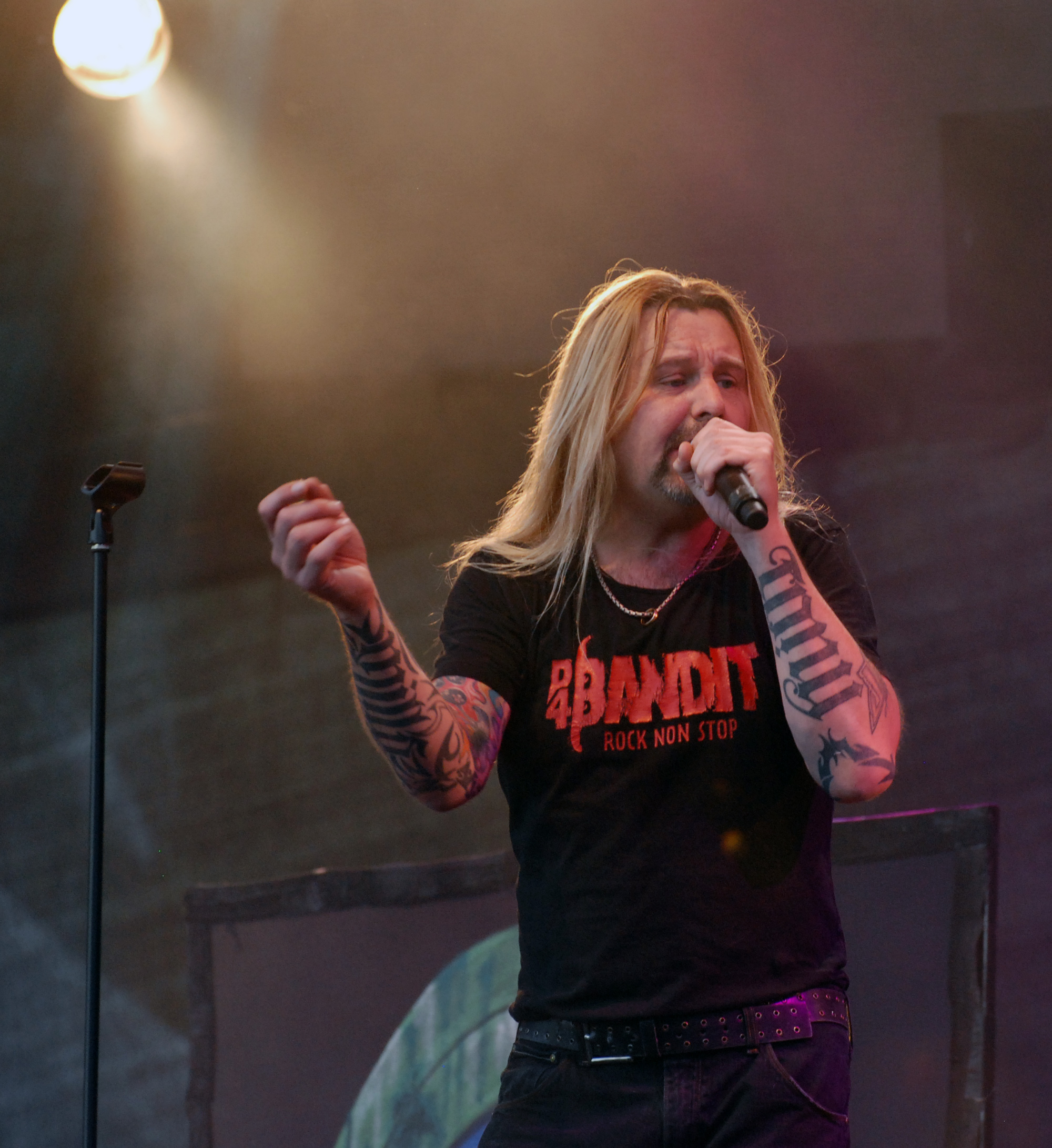
Tony Mills

Diesel Dahl returned to TNT in 2000, and the band started working on new material. The Japan only EP Taste was issued April 2003 which included a TELL NO TALES outtake DESTINY as well still unreleased in most regions Magic Little Nightmare. Their eighth studio album, My Religion, was released in 2004. Months after the album release, Morty Black decided to leave the band due to personal and professional differences, and Sid Ringsby took his place for the following concerts and the album All the Way to the Sun, which was released in the fall of 2005. A single, "Sometimes" was released on 25 July in Norway. At the end of the year Victor Borge became TNT's new permanent bassist.

Tony Harnell left the band in April 2006 for both personal and professional reasons, although his final show was on 30 June, when TNT played the Polar Rock Festival in Storsteinnes, Norway. He was replaced by British hard rock singer Tony Mills (of UK act Shy, coincidentally supporting TNT for Harnell's farewell show). Despite leaving the band, Harnell collaborated with iMagic Films and producer Darren Paltrowitz on a live DVD featuring his performance with the band in Madrid, Spain from 1 April 2006. The Live in Madrid CD + DVD package was released in Japan in August 2006 and elsewhere in the world in September, as produced by Darren Paltrowitz.

In 2007 TNT released their tenth studio album, The New Territory to mixed reviews and controversy amongst the fans. Their eleventh studio album, Atlantis, was released on 22 September 2008 in both Norway and Japan. The album was influenced by The Beatles and Queen, and was mixed by Tommy Hansen, who also worked on My Religion and All the Way to the Sun. On 12 December 2008, the original TNT lineup, consisting of Dag Ingebrigtsen, Ronni Le Tekrø, Steinar Eikum and Diesel Dahl, did a one-off reunion during a concert that was done to celebrate Ingebrigtsen's 50th birthday.

=== 2010s and 2020s ===
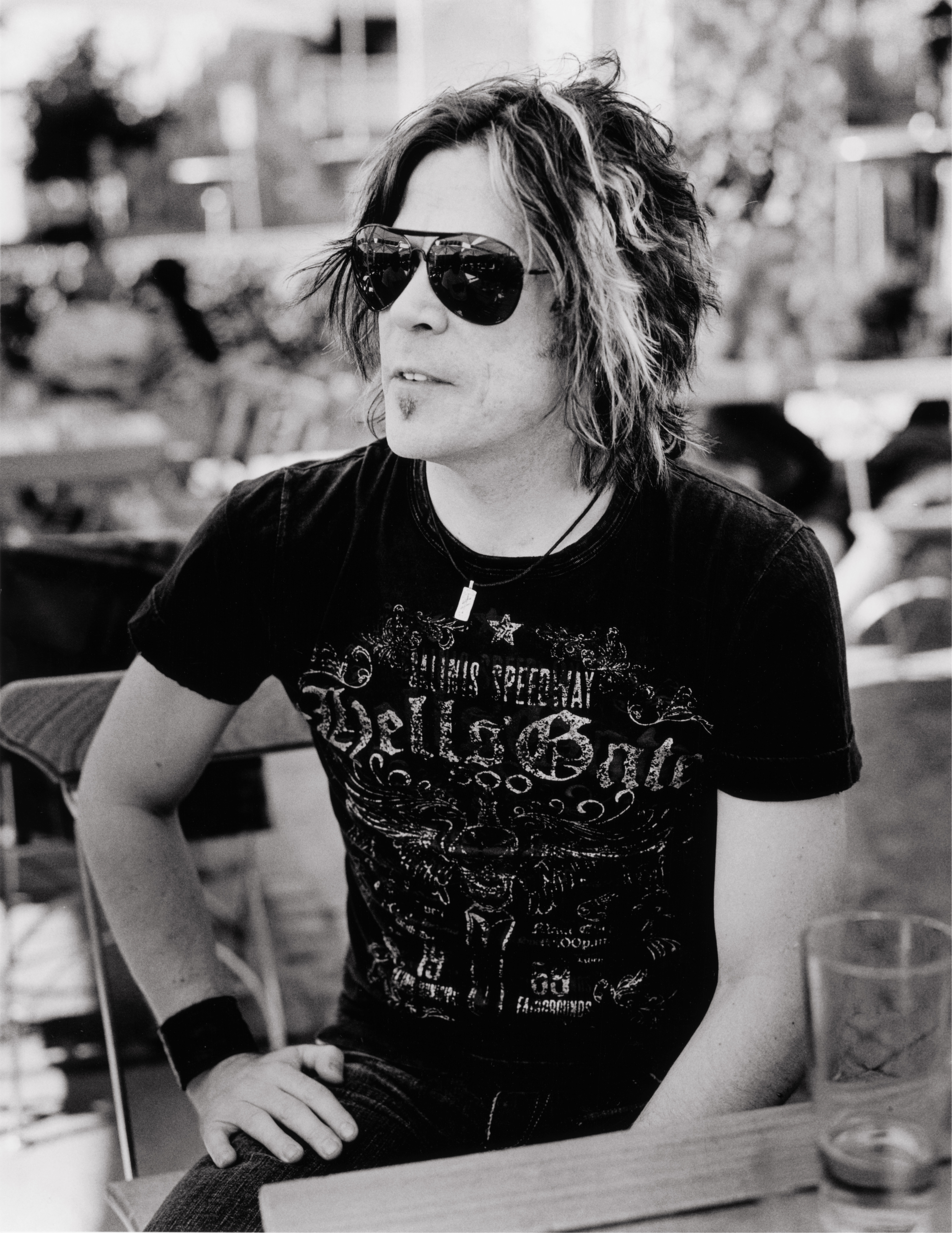
Tony Harnell

TNT's twelfth studio album, A Farewell to Arms, was released in Japan on 15 December 2010. Diesel Dahl has said that the album is an attempt to recapture the old TNT sound. Bård Svendsen, who provided keyboards and backing vocals on Knights of the New Thunder and Tell No Tales, worked on the album as well. The album was mixed by Tommy Hansen, and has been described by him as "Def Leppard on speed". It was released in Europe in January 2011. The album has been retitled as Engine for the Scandinavian and American release. In Norway the album was released as an exclusive joint publishing deal between the Narvesen chain of convenience stores and TNT on 27 December. In an interview on the Norwegian radio show Stjerneklart in January 2011, Ronni Le Tekrø stated that it might be TNT's last album. "I can promise that it will be the very last TNT album," he said, "It might not be fully decided, but we might feel that this album is an honorable end to albums [being released] from the band. TNT will not split up, but I can't see that we're going to make a new studio album for many years."

On 27 April 2011 keyboardist Dag Stokke, who had toured with TNT since April 1987 and appeared on every album from Realized Fantasies to A Farewell to Arms, died of cancer. He was replaced by Roger Gilton.

TNT's concert at Sala Heineken in Madrid on 17 September 2011 was filmed for a future DVD release. TNT celebrated its 30th anniversary by playing one concert at the Clarion Hotel in Trondheim on 2 June 2012, where they performed with the Trondheim Symphony Orchestra as well as both former vocalists, Dag Ingebrigtsen and Tony Harnell, and one concert at Rockefeller Music Hall in Oslo on 17 November 2012, where they performed with Ingebrigtsen and original bassist Steinar Eikum. The Trondheim concert will be released on DVD in the fall of 2013.

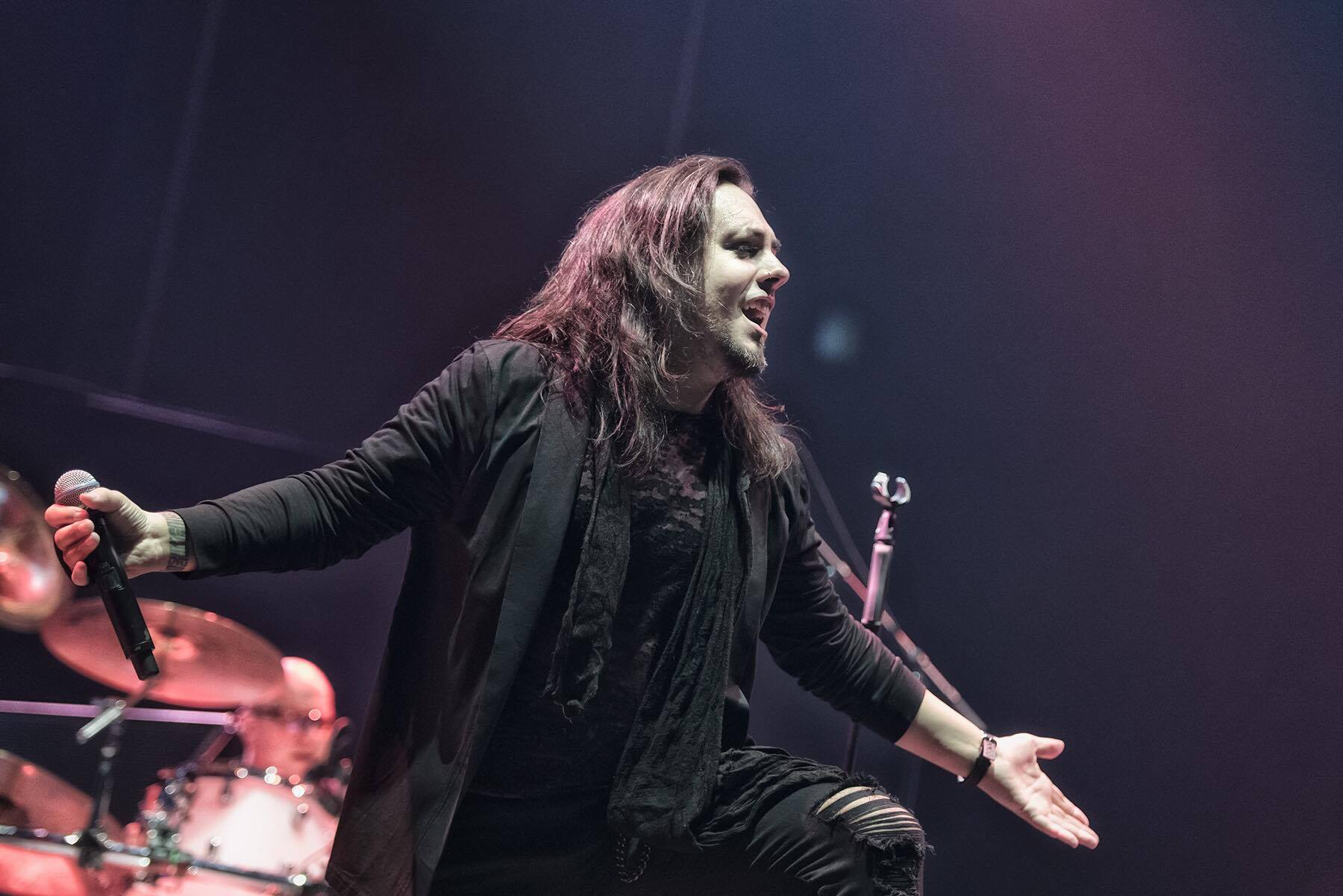
Baol Bardot Bulsara performing at his first concert with TNT in Oslo 2017

Victor Borge left TNT in December 2012 to pursue another project. In March 2013 TNT announced that bassist Sid Ringsby was back in the band. In August 2013 Tony Mills announced that he had decided to leave TNT to pursue solo projects, stating, "For most of this year we have barely played [live] and have not written or recorded anything new. To me that's not how it's supposed to be when you're in a band." In a personal statement published on his official website, Mills stated, "There are other contracts I need to fulfill and a different focus I have to maintain in the coming years. I wish Ronni and his team all the best for their future, however it may shape itself. I shall be fulfilling all the previous engagements booked by the band and expected by the public, with great pleasure."

At the same time, Tony Harnell confirmed that he had had discussions with Ronni Le Tekrø and Diesel Dahl about a reunion. "It's true that the three of us have talked about it, but there are still details that remain to be discussed before I will make any commitments." When asked whether this would only be a one-off reunion, Harnell answered, "I've considered doing a show or two, but those are very imminent and have already been booked with Tony Mills as the vocalist. I've decided that it's best if he carries out as planned, and then the band and I can sit down and discuss if we're going to do anything in the future – with enough time to do it right." On 17 October 2013 Harnell confirmed that he had rejoined TNT, stating, "I'm very proud of all we accomplished over the years and proud to have written and recorded all those great songs with my brother from another mother, Ronni Le Tekrø. Sometimes it's just time to give the fans what they're asking for." Shortly after Harnell's return, long-time bassist Victor Borge also rejoined the band after a year's absence. The band announced several dates in Norway, Sweden, Finland, Germany and Japan from January through to August 2014 and these shows would be the first with Harnell since 2006.

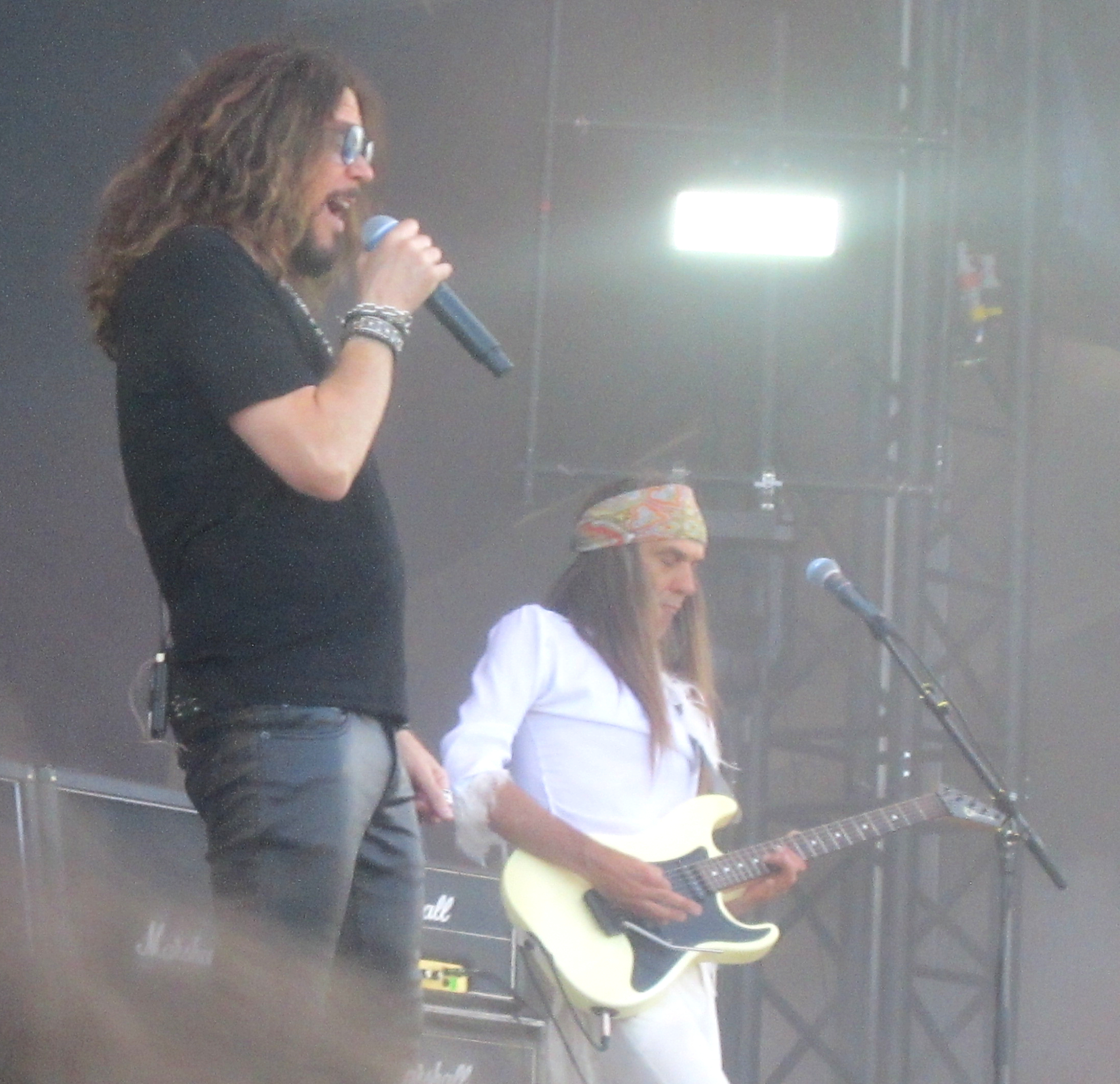
Harnell and Le Tekrø in 2023

In January 2015 Harnell announced that he had left TNT again, but on 21 May 2016, he announced his return to TNT. In 2017 TNT embarked on an anniversary tour to celebrate the 30th anniversary of Tell No Tales with a lineup consisting of Harnell, Ronni Le Tekrø, Diesel Dahl, live keyboardist Roger Gilton and new bassist Ove Husemoen. A new TNT album was said to be released by Frontiers Music Srl. in the spring of 2017, however on 11 October 2017 TNT issued a press release confirming that Harnell had once again parted ways with the band. The press release also stated that TNT would continue with a new vocalist. TNT officially revealed their new and fourth vocalist, Baol Bardot Bulsara, at their opening act gig for Scorpions at Oslo Spektrum on 22 November 2017. TNT's thirteenth studio album, XIII, was released via Frontiers Music Srl. on 8 June 2018.

On 16 September 2019 TNT was inducted into the Rockheim Hall of Fame, the Norwegian equivalent of the Rock and Roll Hall of Fame. A week before the induction ceremony, it was revealed that Dag Ingebrigtsen would not be inducted, which caused Rockheim to receive backlash from the public. The following day Rockheim announced that Ingebrigtsen would be inducted after all, together with Ronni Le Tekrø, Diesel Dahl, Morty Black, Tony Harnell, Victor Borge and Tony Mills, all of which attended the ceremony with the exception of Mills, who was diagnosed with terminal pancreatic cancer in April 2019 and had become too ill to attend, but Rockheim was able to give him the award a week before the ceremony. Mills died on 18 September 2019, at the age of 57. On 8 November 2022 the band officially announced Harnell would return and would perform at the Tons Of Rock festival in Oslo, Norway on 22-25 June 2023. Longtime bassist Sid Ringsby also rejoined the band.

== Band members ==
Current lineup

- Ronni Le Tekrø – lead guitar, guitar synthesizer, keyboards, talkbox, backing vocals (1982–1992, 1996–present)
- Diesel Dahl – drums, percussion (1982–1988, 2000–present)
- Tony Harnell – lead vocals (1984–1992, 1996–2006, 2012, 2013–2015, 2016–2017, 2022–present)
- Sid Ringsby – bass guitar, backing vocals (2004–2005, 2013, 2022–present)

Former members

- Dag Ingebrigtsen – lead vocals, rhythm guitar (1982–1984, 2008, 2012)
- Steinar Eikum – bass guitar, backing vocals (1982–1983, 2008, 2012)
- Morty Black – bass guitar, keyboards, synthesizer, backing vocals (1983–1992, 1996–2004)
- Kenneth Odiin – drums, percussion (1988–1989)
- John Macaluso – drums, percussion (1990–1992)
- Victor Borge – bass guitar, backing vocals (2005–2012, 2013–2016)
- Tony Mills – lead vocals (2006–2013; died 2019)
- Ove Husemoen – bass guitar, backing vocals (2016–2022)
- Baol Bardot Bulsara – lead vocals (2017–2022)

Session/touring members

- Dag Stokke – keyboards, piano, backing vocals (1987–1992, 1996–2011; died 2011)
- Frode Lamøy – drums, percussion (1996–2000)
- Roger Gilton – keyboards, piano, backing vocals (2011–present)

== Discography ==
Year	Title	Label
1983	TNT	PolyGram
1984	Knights of the New Thunder	PolyGram
1987	Tell No Tales	PolyGram
1989	Intuition	PolyGram
1992	Realized Fantasies	Atlantic Records
1997	Firefly	Norske Gram
1999	Transistor	Norske Gram
2004	My Religion	MTM
2005	All the Way to the Sun	MTM
2007	The New Territory	Bonnier Amigo
2008	Atlantis	Bonnier Amigo
2010	A Farewell to Arms	TNT Records
2018	XIII	Frontiers Music Srl.
