= Ronni Le Tekrø =

Norwegian guitarist (born 1963)

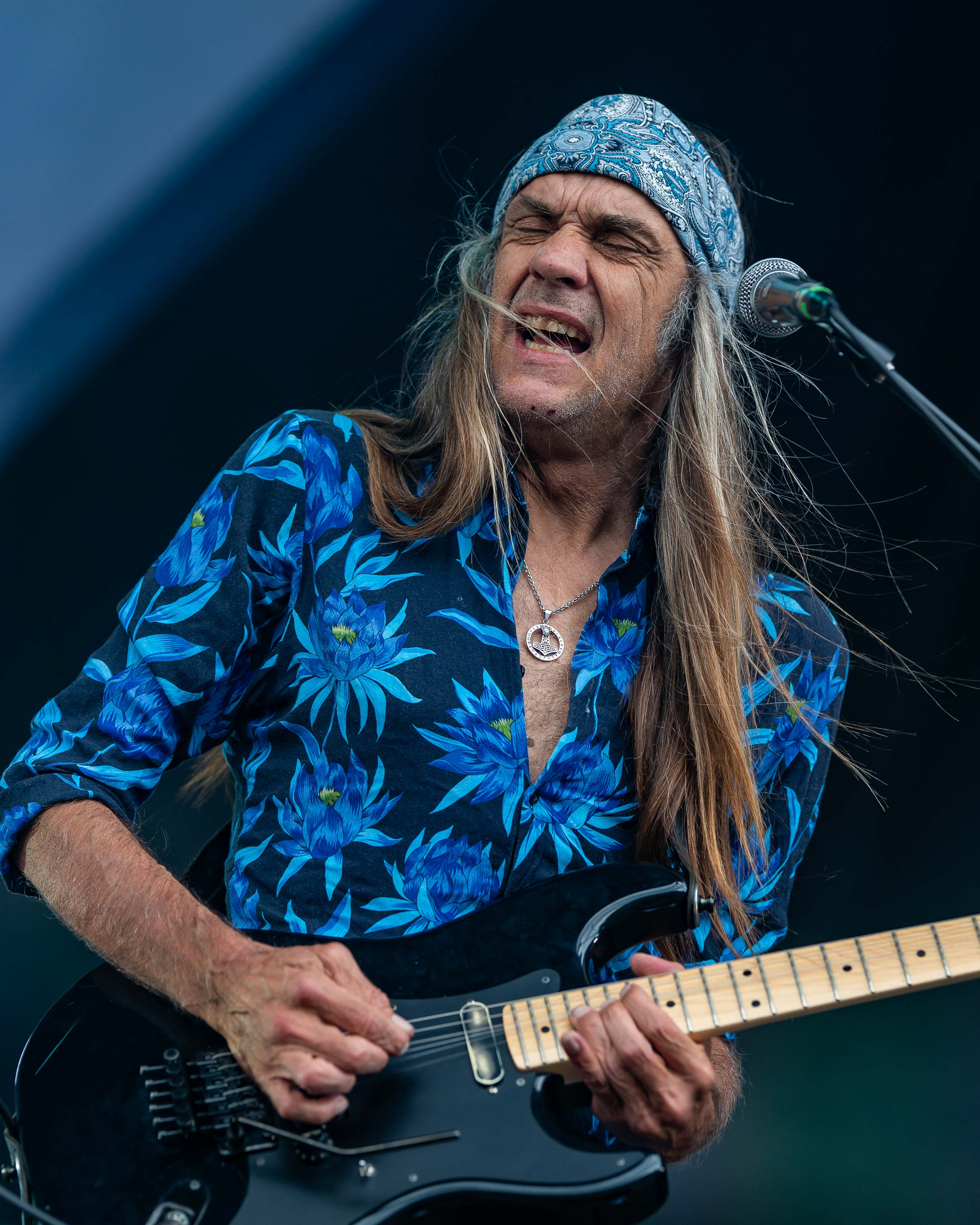
- Le Tekrø performing in 2025

Background information
- Born: Rolf Ågrim Tekrø; 5 October 1963 (age 63); Oslo, Norway
- Genres: Hard rock; heavy metal; glam metal; pop rock
- Occupations: Musician; songwriter
- Instruments: Guitar; vocals
- Years active: 1977–present
- Member of: TNT
- Formerly of: Roquefire; Vagabond
- Website: ronniletekro.com

Ronni Le Tekrø (born Rolf Ågrim Tekrø, 5 October 1963) is a Norwegian musician best known as the guitarist and one of the founders of hard rock band TNT, as a solo artist and for his work with Vagabond and Terje Rypdal. He has been described as "one of the foremost purveyors of melodic metal", with Guitar World ranking him as one of the ten best guitarists in the world in 1989 and one of 25 influential cult guitarists in 2009. Le Tekrø resides in Nyhagen in Vestre Toten Municipality, where he also runs his own studio. He has released thirteen studio albums with TNT and six solo albums.

== Early life ==
Le Tekrø was born in Oslo on 5 October 1963. He moved to Raufoss in Vestre Toten Municipality at a young age and has lived there all his life, with the exception of a period between 1982 and 1985 when he lived in Trondheim. At age twelve, Le Tekrø started playing guitar after being given the choice of joining the scouts or learning guitar by his grandmother. He is a self-taught guitarist and his inspirations include Jimi Hendrix, Uli Jon Roth, Tony Iommi, Steve Hillage, Brian May, Jimmy Page, Brian Robertson, and Ted Nugent.

== Career ==
Le Tekrø joined metal band Roquefire in 1977 and released his first recording with the band, the single "The Island of Marat / (Heavy) Boys Don't Cry", in 1981. He formed TNT in Trondheim in 1982 along with vocalist and rhythm guitarist Dag Ingebrigtsen, bassist Steinar Eikum and drummer Diesel Dahl. He is the only constant member of the band since its inception. TNT released their self-titled debut album in 1982 and has since released thirteen studio albums. Following the band's hiatus in 1992, Le Tekrø formed Vagabond with Morty Black and released two studio albums with the band until TNT reformed in 1996. He later worked with the Norwegian guitarist and composer Terje Rypdal, releasing three albums and one live album during their collaboration in the 1990s and early 2000s. Le Tekrø released his debut solo album, Extra Strong String, in 1998. He toured with Rypedal and guitarist Mads Eriksen as part of the G3-inspired project N3 in 2009. Since 2010, Le Tekrø has collaborated with Ledfoot and the duo released the album A Death Divine in 2020.

== Style and influence ==
Le Tekrø has been named as one of the best guitarists in the world and is noted for his influence as a cult guitarist, as well as his underground following. He is known for his explosive playing style and signature "machine gun" technique, which he claims to have invented during the late 1970s with his then-band Roquefire, in addition to his ability to shift between different styles. Among his admirers are Ozzy Osbourne, George Lynch, Nuno Bettencourt, Dimebag Darrell and Zakk Wylde. Wylde has been an outspoken fan of Le Tekrø for many years and served as a guitar tech for the latter during a TNT performance in July 2023.

== Equipment ==
=== Guitars and amplifiers ===
Le Tekrø is currently endorsed by ESP Guitars and Marshall Amplification. His main live guitar is a light pink, stratocaster-shaped ESP from the early-eighties, dubbed the "Holocaster", with a Seymour Duncan bridge pickup. The headstock is signed by close friend Brian Robertson, formerly of Thin Lizzy and Motörhead. Le Tekrø uses a black early-seventies Fender Stratocaster as a back-up for live performances. On the Atlantis tour, he used an Epiphone 1959 or a Morgan stratocaster on the opening song "Hello, Hello". Le Tekrø has used Marshall 2204 heads and 1960 A cabinets during live performances.

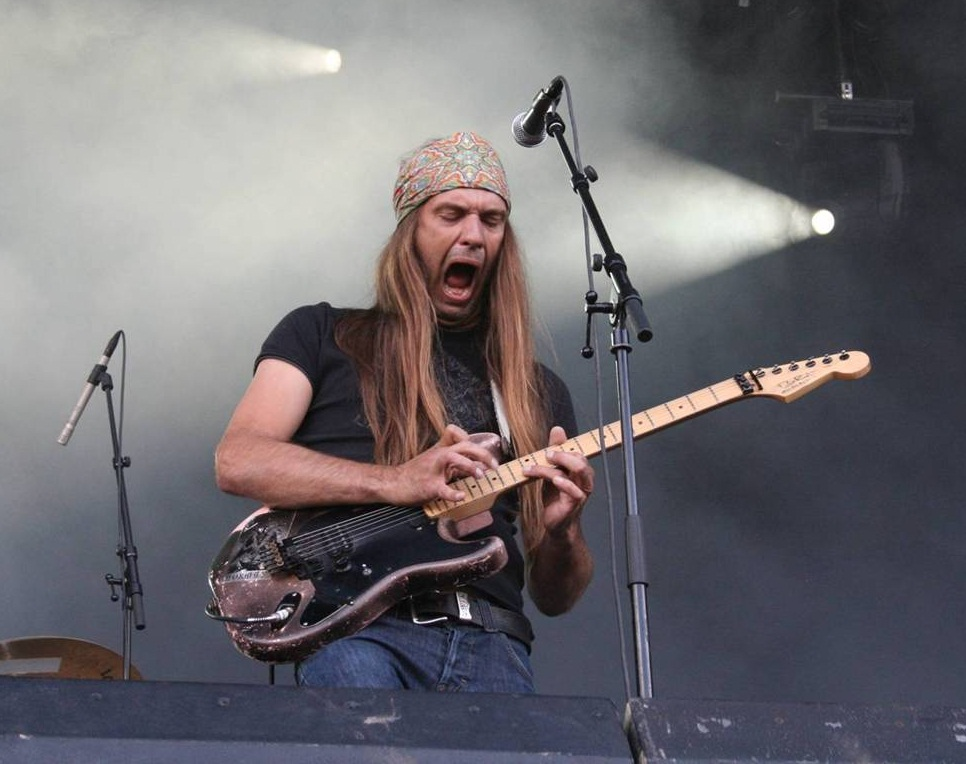
Tekrø performing at Norway Rock Festival 2008

Le Tekrø is known for pioneering the use of the quarterstepper guitar, which has twice as many frets as normal guitar, spread throughout the neck with quarter-tone intervals. The guitar was invented by Bernie Hamburger and Le Tekrø. The quarterstepper can be heard on the solo in the song "Wisdom" off the Intuition album, and several other recordings. Hamburger also built a 12-string hollow body guitar that Le Tekrø has used on various tours and recordings.

=== Effects ===
- OD-1 Overdrive
- BF-2 Flanger
- CE-2 Chorus
- Roland RE-150 Space Echo Tape Delay,
- Dunlop CryBaby
- Digitech Whammy II

== Religious beliefs ==
Le Tekrø has been practicing the nature religion Wicca since the 1980s and has a master's degree in Wicca Witchcraft. He stated in an interview with Norwegian newspaper Aftenposten in 2007 that Wicca helps him deal with matters such as death and guilt, and that he prefers it to "fairytales from the Middle East which have thrown an entire world into war".

== Selected discography ==
=== With TNT ===
- TNT (1982)
- Knights of the New Thunder (1984)
- Tell No Tales (1987)
- Intuition (1989)
- Realized Fantasies (1992)
- Firefly (1997)
- Transistor (1999)
- My Religion (2004)
- All the Way to the Sun (2005)
- The New Territory (2007)
- Atlantis (2008)
- A Farewell to Arms (2010)
- XIII (2018)

=== With Rypdal & Tekrø ===
- Rypdal & Tekrø (1994)
- Rypdal/Tekrø II (1998)
- The Radiosong (2002)

=== With Vagabond ===
- Vagabond (1994)
- A Huge Fan Of Life (1995)

=== As a solo artist ===
- Extra Strong String (1998)
- Magica Lanterna (2002)
- Kingdom of Norway (2007)
- Mein Ampf (2014)
- Mein Ampf II (2015)
- Bigfoot TV (2022)

=== With Ronnie Le Tekrø & The Evil Elf band ===
- Under the Misteltoe (2002)

=== With Ledfoot & Ronni Le Tekrø ===
- A Death Divine (2020)
- Limited Edition Lava Lamp (2023)

=== Collaborations and guest appearances ===
- Wonderland (Embee Normann) (1993)
- Dedicated to Thin Lizzy (Bad Habitz) (1993)
- Starfire (Jørn Lande) (2000) – Guest on "The Day the Earth Caught Fire"
- Le Freak on Let's dance (Norwegian Gospel Voices) (2002)
- Camouflage (Wild Willy's Gang) (2005)
- Gods Of Thunder – A Norwegian Tribute To KISS (2005) – Covered "Detroit Rock City" with Tony Harnell
- Unlocking the Past (Jørn Lande) (2007) – Guest on "The Day the Earth Caught Fire"
- Demonoir (1349) (2010)
- "Telegram" (The Halloween Project, The Fluffy Jackets) (2021)
