= Dag Ingebrigtsen =

Norwegian musician (born 1958)

- Born: 12 December 1958 (age 67); Trondheim, Norway
- Genres: Hard rock, glam metal
- Instruments: Vocals, guitar
- Years active: 1977–present
- Website: dagingebrigtsen.no

Dag Ingebrigtsen (born 12 December 1958) is a Norwegian musician who had his debut in 1977 with the group Subway Suck.

Ingebrigtsen was born in Trondheim, Norway. He got his breakthrough in 1980 with the rock band The Kids, who had the hit "Forelska i lærer'n" ("In love with the teacher"). After his success with The Kids, he fronted the Norwegian hard rock band TNT. He sang and played rhythm guitar on their self-titled debut album in 1982 before being replaced by American Tony Harnell two years later. He reunited with TNT live during their 25th Anniversary concert to sing "Harley Davidson".

He is the father of the ski jumper Tommy Ingebrigtsen.
