= Morten Skaget =

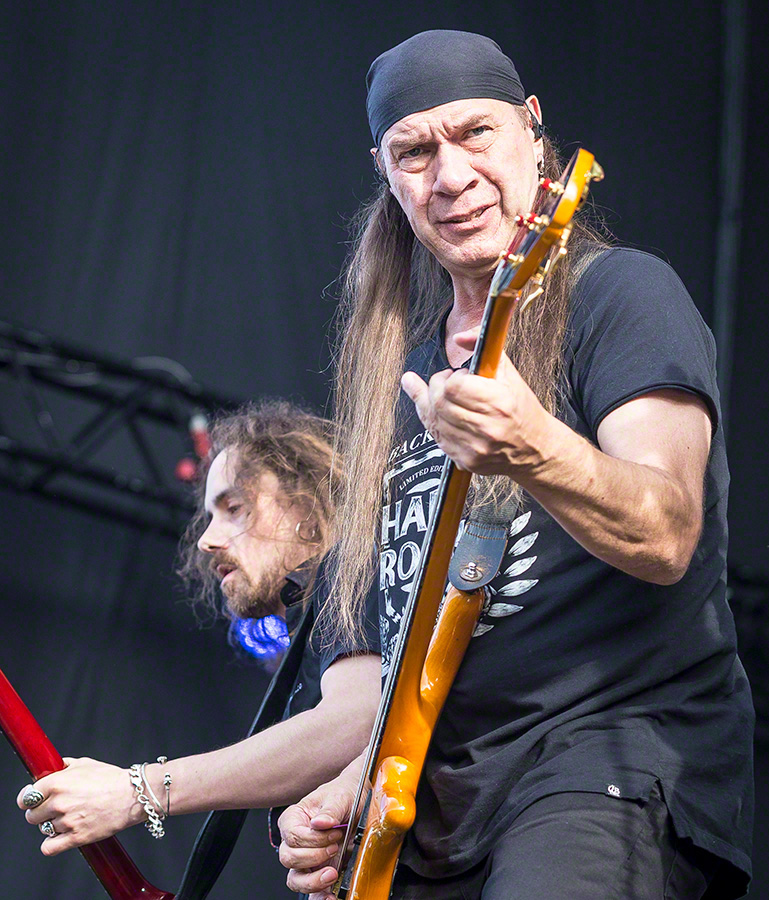
- Skaget performing with Sambandet in 2016

Background information
- Also known as: Morty Black
- Born: 12 August 1960 (age 65); Trondheim, Norway
- Genres: Hard rock, glam metal
- Instruments: Bass guitar, keyboard, synthesizer, vocals
- Years active: 1983–present
- Website: www.mortyblack.com

Morten Skaget (born on 12 August 1960 in Trondheim, Norway), most commonly known by his former stage name Morty Black, is a bassist best known for playing with international bands like JORN, Ken Hensley, Terje Rypdal and TNT. He has also played for many famous Norwegian artists and has also been a bassist for Mariah Carey. He also plays drums and once played the ride cymbal in the TNT song "Seven Seas". Away from music he is the father of four children. His stepson, Ståle Stiil, was the first rapper to sing lyrics in Norwegian with his album Yo! in 1992.

== Discography ==
=== TNT ===
- Knights of the New Thunder (1984)
- Tell No Tales (1987)
- Intuition (1989)
- Realized Fantasies (1992)
- Three Nights in Tokyo (Live) (1992)
- Firefly (1997)
- Transistor (1999)
- Give me a Sign EP (2003)
- My Religion (2004)

=== Vagabond ===
- Vagabond (1994)
- A Huge Fan of Life (1995)

=== JORN ===
- The Duke (2006)
- The Gathering (2007)
- Unlocking the Past (2007)

=== Tony Mills ===
- Vital Designs (2008)

=== Stargazer ===
- Stargazer (2009)

=== Northward ===
- Northward (2018)
