= Metal Is Forever – The Very Best of Primal Fear =

Greatest hits album by Primal Fear
- Released: 29 September 2006
- Recorded: 1998–2006
- Genre: Heavy metal, power metal
- Length: 77:09
- Label: Nuclear Blast
- Producer: Mat Sinner

Primal Fear chronology
Seven Seals (2005)	Metal Is Forever – The Very Best of Primal Fear (2006)	New Religion (2007)

Metal Is Forever – The Very Best of Primal Fear is the first best-of album released by the German power metal group Primal Fear. It contains two CD's, with the first containing the band's hits, and the second covering other metal songs.

== Track listing ==
CD 1
No.	Title	Original album	Length
1.	"Metal Is Forever"	Devil's Ground (2004)	4:46
2.	"Chainbreaker"	Primal Fear (1998)	4:39
3.	"Seven Seals"	Seven Seals (2005)	3:54
4.	"Nuclear Fire"	Nuclear Fire (2001)	4:23
5.	"Final Embrace"	Jaws of Death (1999)	5:08
6.	"The Healer"	Devil's Ground (2004)	6:40
7.	"Rollercoaster"	Seven Seals (2005)	4:28
8.	"Armageddon"	Black Sun (2002)	4:05
9.	"Angel in Black"	Nuclear Fire (2001)	3:58
10.	"Under Your Spell"	Jaws of Death (1999)	5:36
11.	"Evil Spell"	Seven Seals (2005)	4:32
12.	"Running in the Dust"	Primal Fear (1998)	4:37
13.	"Suicide and Mania"	Devil's Ground (2004)	4:03
14.	"Iron Fist in a Velvet Glove"	Nuclear Fire (2001)	5:17
15.	"Fear"	Black Sun (2002)	4:20
16.	"Tears of Rage"	Primal Fear (1998)	6:47
Total length:			77:09

CD 2: Metal Classics
No.	Title	Length
1.	"Out in the Fields" (Gary Moore cover)	3:57
2.	"Kill the King" (Rainbow cover)	4:32
3.	"Speed King" (Deep Purple cover)	3:59
4.	"Die Young" (Black Sabbath cover)	4:05
5.	"Metal Gods" (Judas Priest cover)	3:37
6.	"Breaker" (Accept cover)	3:29
7.	"Seek and Destroy" (Metallica cover)	7:10
8.	"2 Minutes to Midnight" (Iron Maiden cover)	6:01
9.	"The Rover" (Led Zeppelin cover)	4:46
Total length:		41:36

- Bonus CD "Metal Classics": classic cover songs, only in the European edition.

== Personal ==
- Ralf Scheepers – vocals
- Henny Wolter – guitars
- Tom Naumann – guitar
- Stefan Leibing – guitar, keyboards
- Mat Sinner – bass guitar, vocals
- Randy Black – drums
- Klaus Sperling – drums

Production

- Stephan Lohrmann – cover art
- Mat Sinner – producer
- Achim Köhler – engineering, mixing, remastering at Indiscreet Studios, Germany
- Charlie Bauerfeind – engineering, mixing
- Mike Frazer – engineering, mixing
