= Free Fall (Magnus Karlsson album) =

2013 album by Magnus Karlsson

Studio album by Magnus Karlsson's Free Fall
- Released: June 14, 2013
- Recorded: 2012–2013
- Genres: Heavy metal, hard rock
- Label: Frontiers Records
- Producer: Magnus Karlsson

Magnus Karlsson's Free Fall chronology
Free Fall (2013)	Kingdom of Rock (2015)

Free Fall is the first full-length studio album by Swedish heavy metal songwriter, guitarist, multi-instrumentalist and producer Magnus Karlsson.

It was released under the project name Magnus Karlsson's Free Fall on June 11, 2013 in North America and June 14 in Europe by Frontiers Records and features many guest singers who worked with Magnus on his many previous projects, including Russell Allen (one of the singers of the duo Allen/Lande), Ralf Scheepers (vocalist of Primal Fear, Magnus current band), Tony Harnell (who worked with Magnus in the band Starbreaker), Rickard Bengtsson (former bandmate from Last Tribe), Mark Boals (who worked with Magnus in the project The Codex), Mike Andersson (who worked with Magnus in the project Planet Alliance) and some other famous friends like David Readman (Pink Cream 69, Voodoo Circle), Rick Altzi (At Vance, Masterplan) and Herman Saming (ACT).

Magnus also sings three tracks on the album himself and Daniel Flores (who also worked with Magnus in the project The Codex) recorded the drums.

== Track listing ==
All tracks are written by Magnus Karlsson.

No.	Title	Vocalist	Length
1.	"Free Fall"	Russell Allen	5:34
2.	"Higher"	Ralf Scheepers	4:35
3.	"Heading Out"	Magnus Karlsson	4:17
4.	"Stronger"	Tony Harnell	5:12
5.	"Not My Saviour"	Rick Altzi	4:25
6.	"Us Against The World"	David Readman	3:15
7.	"Our Time Has Come"	Mark Boals	4:46
8.	"Ready or Not"	Magnus Karlsson	4:11
9.	"Last Tribe"	Rickard Bengtsson	4:55
10.	"Fighting"	Herman Saming	4:57
11.	"Dreamers & Hunters"	Mike Andersson	3:32
12.	"On Fire"	Magnus Karlsson	3:57
13.	"Stronger (Acoustic) japanese bonus track"	Magnus Karlsson	5:11

== Personnel ==
- Magnus Karlsson - Guitar, Bass Guitar, Keyboards & Producer, Backing vocals, Lead vocals on tracks 3, 8, 12 & 13
- Daniel Flores - Drums, Mixing

Guests Singers

- Russell Allen (Symphony X, Allen-Lande, Adrenaline Mob) - lead vocals on track 1
- Ralf Scheepers (Primal Fear, ex-Gamma Ray) - lead vocals on track 2
- Tony Harnell (TNT, Starbreaker, Westworld) - lead vocals on track 4
- Rick Altzi (At Vance, Masterplan, ex-Thunderstone) - lead vocals on track 5
- David Readman (Pink Cream 69, ex-Voodoo Circle, ex-Adagio) - lead vocals on track 6
- Mark Boals (The Codex, ex-Yngwie Malmsteen band, ex-Royal Hunt) - lead vocals on track 7
- Rickard Bengtsson (Last Tribe) - lead vocals on track 9
- Herman Saming (ACT) - lead vocals on track 10
- Mike Andersson (Planet Alliance, Cloudscape, Full Force) - lead vocals on track 11
