= Seven Seals (album) =

Studio album by Primal Fear
- Released: 15 October 2005
- Studios: House of Music Studios (Winterbach, Germany), The Warehouse Studio (Vancouver, British Columbia, Canada)
- Genres: Heavy metal, power metal
- Label: Nuclear Blast
- Producers: Mat Sinner Stefan Leibing & Charlie Bauerfeind

Primal Fear chronology
Devil's Ground (2004)	Seven Seals (2005)	Metal Is Forever – The Very Best of Primal Fear (2006)

Professional ratings
Review scores
Source	Rating
Allmusic	3.5/5 stars
Blabbermouth.net	8.5/10
Sputnikmusic	4.5/5

Seven Seals is the sixth album by the German power metal band Primal Fear, released on 15 October 2005. It is the first album with artwork which does not contain a scene depicting their bird-of-prey mascot, but instead a logo based upon it (a burning version of which is also seen on their next studio album New Religion). It is also the first album recorded in Standard D Tuning.

A music video was made for "Seven Seals". The album has received highly positive reviews.

== Track listing ==
All songs written by Mat Sinner, Stefan Leibing, Tom Naumann and Ralf Scheepers, except where noted.

No.	Title	Writer(s)	Length
1.	"Demons and Angels"		5:32
2.	"Rollercoaster"		4:28
3.	"Seven Seals"	Sinner, Tobias Lundgren, Ronny Milianowicz	3:54
4.	"Evil Spell"		4:32
5.	"The Immortal Ones"		4:19
6.	"Diabolus"	Sinner, Lundgren, Milianowicz	7:54
7.	"All for One"		7:53
8.	"Carniwar"		3:17
9.	"Question of Honour" (Sinner cover)	Sinner, Naumann	7:26
10.	"In Memory"		5:07
Total length:			54:22

Japanese Bonus Track
No.	Title	Length
11.	"The Union"	5:11
Total length:		59:33

Limited Edition Bonus Tracks
No.	Title	Length
11.	"The Union"	5:11
12.	"Higher Power"	4:30
Total length:		64:03

== Personnel ==
- Ralf Scheepers – lead vocal
- Stefan Leibing – guitars, keyboards
- Tom Naumann – guitars
- Mat Sinner – bass guitar, backing vocal
- Randy Black – drums

Additional musicians

- Matz Ulmer – keyboards, string arrangements

== Production ==
- Mat Sinner – producer
- Charlie Bauerfeind – producer, engineering
- Mike Cashin – mixing (additional)
- Nikolai Wurk – engineering (additional)
- Mike Fraser – mixing
- Achim "Akeem" Köhler – mastering
- Paul Silveira – engineering (additional)
- Katja Piolka – photography, layout, design
- Martin Häusler – cover art
