= Domination (Primal Fear album) =

Studio album by Primal Fear
- Released: 5 September 2025
- Studios: Hansen Studios, Denmark; Kangaroo Studios, Germany
- Genres: Heavy metal, power metal
- Length: 59:00
- Label: Reigning Phoenix Music
- Producers: Mat Sinner, Ralf Scheepers, Magnus Karlsson

Primal Fear chronology
Code Red (2023)	Domination (2025)

Singles from Domination
- 1. "Far Away" Released: 25 April 2025; 2. "The Hunter" Released: 12 June 2025; 3. "Tears of Fire" Released: 1 August 2025; 4. "I am the Primal Fear" Released: 6 September 2025

Domination is the fifteenth studio album by German heavy metal band Primal Fear. The album was released on 5 September 2025 via Reigning Phoenix Music, and has received positive feedback.

== Background and promotion ==
On 23 August 2024, it was announced that guitarists Alex Beyrodt and Tom Naumann, drummer Michael Ehré, and touring bassist Alex Jansen had all departed the band. Five days later, the band announced Thalìa Bellazecca as their new guitarist. On 31 August, the band announced André Hilgers as their new drummer.

Singles and music videos were released for several songs in the album including "Far Away", "The Hunter", "Tears of Fire", and "I am the Primal Fear".

== Track listing ==
Domination track listing
No.	Title	Length
1.	"The Hunter"	4:21
2.	"Destroyer"	4:31
3.	"Far Away"	4:19
4.	"I Am the Primal Fear"	5:43
5.	"Tears of Fire"	5:03
6.	"Heroes and Gods"	4:01
7.	"Hallucinations"	2:32
8.	"Eden"	7:10
9.	"Scream"	4:22
10.	"The Dead Don't Die"	4:22
11.	"Crossfire"	4:12
12.	"March Boy March"	4:58
13.	"A Tune I Won't Forget"	3:26
Total length:		59:00

Bonus track
No.	Title	Length
14.	"Bridges Will Burn"	4:20
Total length:		63:20

== Personnel ==
Primal Fear

- Ralf Scheepers – lead vocals, producer
- Mat Sinner – bass, co-lead vocals, producer
- Magnus Karlsson – guitars, keyboards, producer
- Thalìa Bellazecca – guitars
- André Hilgers – drums

Guests

- Melissa Bonny – vocals in "Eden"

Production

- Jacob Hansen – mixing, mastering
- Dennis Ward – recording

== Charts ==
Chart performance for Domination
Chart (2025)	Peak position
Austrian Albums (Ö3 Austria)	13
German Albums (Offizielle Top 100)	10
German Rock & Metal Albums (Offizielle Top 100)	3
Greek Albums (IFPI)	73
Japanese Albums (Oricon)	48
Japanese Rock Albums (Oricon)	14
Japanese Top Albums Sales (Billboard Japan)	46
Swedish Hard Rock Albums (Sverigetopplistan)	13
Swedish Physical Albums (Sverigetopplistan)	9
UK Albums Sales (OCC)	100
UK Independent Albums (Official Charts)	12
UK Rock & Metal Albums (Official Charts)	42
