= Code Red (Primal Fear album) =

Studio album by Primal Fear
- Released: 1 September 2023
- Studio: Hansen Studios, Denmark; Backyard Studios
- Genre: Heavy metal, power metal
- Length: 57:56
- Label: Atomic Fire
- Producer: Mat Sinner, Ralf Scheepers, Tom Naumann

Primal Fear chronology
| Metal Commando (2020) | Code Red (2023) | Domination (2025) |

Singles from Code Red
- 1. "Another Hero" Released: 1 June 2023; 2. "Deep in the Night" Released: 20 July 2023; 3. "Cancel Culture" Released: 31 August 2023

Professional ratings
Review scores
| Source | Rating |
|---|---|
| Distorted Sound | 6/10 |
| Metal-Roos | 5/5 stars |
| Wall of Sound | 8/10 |

Code Red is the fourteenth studio album by German heavy metal band Primal Fear. The album was released on 1 September 2023 via Atomic Fire. It is the final album with drummer Michael Ehré and guitarists Tom Naumann and Alex Beyrodt. Music videos were released for several songs in the album including "Deep in the Night".

== Track listing ==
Code Red track listing
| No. | Title | Length |
|---|---|---|
| 1. | "Another Hero" | 4:59 |
| 2. | "Bring That Noise" | 4:49 |
| 3. | "Deep in the Night" | 5:47 |
| 4. | "Cancel Culture" | 6:48 |
| 5. | "Play a Song" | 4:08 |
| 6. | "The World is on Fire" | 5:04 |
| 7. | "Their Gods Have Failed" | 7:26 |
| 8. | "Steelmelter" | 4:52 |
| 9. | "Raged by Pain" | 3:22 |
| 10. | "Forever" | 5:12 |
| 11. | "Fearless" | 5:29 |
| Total length: | | 57:56 |

== Personnel ==
Primal Fear

- Ralf Scheepers – lead vocals, producer
- Mat Sinner – bass, co-lead vocals, producer
- Magnus Karlsson – guitars, keyboards
- Alex Beyrodt – guitars
- Tom Naumann – guitars, producer
- Michael Ehré – drums

Production

- Jacob Hansen – mixing, mastering
- Stan-W Decker – cover art, layout

== Charts ==
Chart performance for Code Red
| Chart (2020) | Peak position |
|---|---|
| Austrian Albums (Ö3 Austria) | 36 |
| Belgian Albums (Ultratop Flanders) | 113 |
| Belgian Albums (Ultratop Wallonia) | 190 |
| German Albums (Offizielle Top 100) | 6 |
| Swiss Albums (Schweizer Hitparade) | 6 |
