= Delivering the Black =

Studio album by Primal Fear
- Released: 22 January 2014
- Genres: Heavy metal, power metal, speed metal
- Label: Frontiers Records

Primal Fear chronology
Unbreakable (2012)	Delivering the Black (2014)	Rulebreaker (2016)

Singles from Delivering the Black
- 1. "When Death Come Knocking" Released: 2 December 2013

Professional ratings
Review scores
Source	Rating
Jukebox:Metal	4/5 stars
Metal Storm	9/10 stars
Ultimate-Guitar	8.2/10

Delivering the Black is the tenth studio album from German heavy metal band Primal Fear, which was released on 24 January 2014 via Frontiers Records.

Music videos were made for "When Death Comes Knocking", "King for a Day" and "Alive & on Fire".

== Track listing ==
All lyrics are written by Mat Sinner, Magnus Karlsson and Ralf Scheepers.

No.	Title	Length
1.	"King for a Day"	3:44
2.	"Rebel Faction"	4:41
3.	"When Death Comes Knocking"	6:58
4.	"Alive & on Fire"	4:48
5.	"Delivering the Black"	4:01
6.	"Road to Asylum"	3:48
7.	"One Night in December"	9:18
8.	"Never Pray for Justice"	4:23
9.	"Born with a Broken Heart"	4:36
10.	"Inseminoid"	5:01
Total length:		51:18

Limited Edition Bonus Tracks
No.	Title	Length
1.	"Innocent Man"	4:12
2.	"Man Without Shadow"	4:03
3.	"When Death Comes Knocking" (Single Edit)	4:25
Total length:		63:58

Japanese Bonus Tracks
No.	Title	Length
1.	"Innocent Man"	4:12
2.	"Man Without Shadow"	4:03
3.	"When Death Comes Knocking" (Single Edit)	4:25
4.	"Born with a Broken Heart" (Edit Version)	4:13
Total length:		68:11

Note

- Limited Edition releases contains a DVD featuring two music videos and the making of the album

== Charts ==
Chart	Peak position
German Albums Chart	13

== Personnel ==
- Ralf Scheepers - Vocals
- Mat Sinner - Bass, vocals
- Magnus Karlsson - Guitars, keyboards
- Alexander Beyrodt - Guitars
- Randy Black - Drums

Additional Musicians

- Liv Kristine - Backing vocals on "Born with a Broken Heart", co-lead vocals on edit version

== Production ==
- Mat Sinner - Producer, Lyrics
- Achim Koehler - Recording
- Jacob Hansen - Mixing, Mastering
- Ralf Scheepers - Co-producer (vocals), Lyrics
- Magnus Karlsson - Co-producer, Lyrics
- Oliver Barth - Filming (Bonus DVD)
- Sinja Mueller - Recording (assistant)
- Jobert Mello - Cover art, Artwork, Layout
- Alex Kuehr - Photography
