= New Religion (album) =

Studio album by Primal Fear
- Released: 21 September 2007
- Studios: House of Music Studios, Winterbach, Germany; Galaxy Studios, Mol, Belgium
- Genres: Heavy metal, power metal
- Label: Frontiers Records
- Producer: Mat Sinner

Primal Fear chronology
Metal Is Forever – The Very Best of Primal Fear (2006)	New Religion (2007)	16.6 (Before the Devil Knows You're Dead) (2009)

Professional ratings
Review scores
Source	Rating
Allmusic	3.5/5 stars
Metal Express Radio	9/10
Sputnikmusic	2/5
Truemetal	85/100

New Religion is Primal Fear's seventh full-length album, released on 21 September 2007.

Music videos were made for "Fighting the Darkness" and "Sign of Fear".

== Track listing ==
No.	Title	Length
1.	"Sign of Fear"	4:47
2.	"Face the Emptiness"	4:35
3.	"Everytime It Rains" (featuring Simone Simons)	3:52
4.	"New Religion"	4:04
5.	"Fighting the Darkness"	3:36
6.	"The Darkness"	3:51
7.	"Reprise"	1:16
8.	"Blood On Your Hands"	4:02
9.	"The Curse of Sharon"	4:40
10.	"Too Much Time"	5:13
11.	"Psycho"	3:54
12.	"World on Fire"	3:53
13.	"The Man (That I Don't Know)"	6:13
Total length:		53:56

Enhanced Digipak Bonus Tracks
No.	Title	Length
1.	"Fighting the Darkness" (Video)
2.	"Sign of Fear" (Video)

Japanese Bonus Track
No.	Title	Length
14.	"Fighting the Darkness" (Orchestral Version)	2:48
Total length:		56:44

== Personnel ==
Primal Fear

- Ralf Scheepers – lead vocals
- Henny Wolter – guitars
- Stefan Leibing – guitars
- Mat Sinner – bass guitar, vocals
- Randy Black – drums

Guest/session musicians

- Simone Simons – female vocals on "Everytime It Rains"
- Magnus Karlsson – lead guitars on "Everytime It Rains"
- Tobias Lundgren – backing vocals
- Ronny Milianowicz – loops
- Matthias Ulmer – keyboards, orchestral arrangements

== Production ==
- Mat Sinner – producer, engineering (additional)
- Charlie Bauerfeind – producer (additional), engineering
- Ralf Scheepers – engineering (additional)
- Achim "Akeem" Köhler – engineering (additional), mastering
- Ronald Prent – mixing
- Macela Zorro – mixing (additional)
- Katja Piolka – cover art, photography
