= Nuclear Fire =

Studio album by Primal Fear
- Released: January 2001
- Recorded: 2000
- Genre: Heavy metal, power metal
- Label: Nuclear Blast
- Producer: Mat Sinner

Primal Fear chronology
Jaws of Death (1999)	Nuclear Fire (2001)	Black Sun (2002)

Singles from Nuclear Fire
- 1. "Out in the Fields" Released: 10 December 2001

Professional ratings
Review scores
Source	Rating
AllMusic	link

Nuclear Fire is the third album by the German heavy metal band Primal Fear. It was released in 2001.

A music video was made for "Angel in Black".

== Track listing ==
No.	Title	Length
1.	"Angel in Black"	3:58
2.	"Kiss of Death"	3:50
3.	"Back from Hell"	3:46
4.	"Now or Never"	5:33
5.	"Fight the Fire"	4:23
6.	"Eye of an Eagle"	4:28
7.	"Bleed for Me"	5:04
8.	"Nuclear Fire"	4:23
9.	"Red Rain"	4:51
10.	"Fire on the Horizon"	3:31
11.	"Living for Metal"	3:42
Total length:		47:29

Enhanced edition bonus track
No.	Title	Length
1.	"Iron Fist in a Velvet Glove"	5:17
Total length:		52:46

Japanese edition bonus tracks
No.	Title	Length
1.	"Iron Fist in a Velvet Glove"	5:17
2.	"Out in the Fields" (Gary Moore cover)	3:58
Total length:		56:44

2010 bonus tracks
No.	Title	Length
1.	"Iron Fist in a Velvet Glove"	5:17
2.	"Out in the Fields" (Gary Moore cover)	3:58
3.	"Angel in Black" (video)
Total length:		56:44

== Credits ==
- Ralf Scheepers – vocals
- Stefan Leibing – guitar
- Henny Wolter – guitar
- Mat Sinner – bass, vocals
- Klaus Sperling – drums

=== Production ===
- Stephan Lohrmann – cover art
- Jens Saupe – photography
- Achim Köhler – engineering, mastering
- Sander N. – design
- Mat Sinner – production
