= Chapter One (Level 10 album) =

Studio album by Level 10
- Released: January 23, 2015
- Studios: Russell Allen Studio, South River, New Jersey, US; Level 10 Studio, Ostfildern, Germany; Guitarslinger Studio, Spiesen-Elversberg, Germany; Ivorytears Music Works, Somma Lombardo, Italy
- Genre: Heavy metal
- Length: 53:02 (International version); 56:34 (Japanese version)
- Label: Frontiers Records
- Producer: Mat Sinner

Singles from Chapter One
- 1. "Blasphemy" Released: December 15, 2014; 2. "Cry No More" Released: January 23, 2015

Chapter One is the first album by project Level 10 featuring Symphony X and Adrenaline Mob vocalist Russell Allen and bassist/producer Mat Sinner. It was released via Frontiers Records on January 23, 2015 with Cry No More single lyric video and it was anticipated by single Blasphemy on December 15, 2014.

The lineup is completed by drummer Randy Black and guitar players Alex Beyrodt of Primal Fear, Roland Grapow of Masterplan and Alessandro Del Vecchio (Hardline, Jorn, Edge of Forever) on keyboards.

The album also features songs from Amanda Somerville, Carsten Schulz, Magnus Karlsson and Sander Gommans.

== Track listing ==
All songs written by Russell Allen, Alex Beyrodt, Sander Gommans, Magnus Karlsson, Carsten Schulz, Mat Sinner, Amanda Somerville and Alessandro Del Vecchio.

No.	Title	Length
1.	"Cry No More"	4:23
2.	"Soul Of A Warrior"	5:49
3.	"When The Nighttime Comes"	4:05
4.	"One Way Street"	5:02
5.	"Blasphemy"	4:31
6.	"Last Man On Earth"	3:35
7.	"In For The Kill"	4:16
8.	"Voice Of The Wilderness"	4:22
9.	"All Hope Is Gone"	4:13
10.	"Demonized"	3:57
11.	"The Soul Is Eternal"	4:51
12.	"Forevermore"	3:58
Total length:		53:02

Japanese bonus track
No.	Title	Length
13.	"All Hope Is Gone" (acoustic version)	3:32

== Personnel ==
- Russell Allen - vocals
- Mat Sinner - bass guitar, backing vocals, producing

=== Musicians ===
- Alex Beyrodt - guitars
- Roland Grapow - guitars
- Alessandro Del Vecchio - keyboards
- Randy Black - drums, percussion

=== Additional personnel ===
- Sander Gommans - guitar on track 5
- Carsten Schulz - backing vocals on tracks 8
- Magnus Karlsson - acoustic guitar on track 9
- Serafino Perugino - executive producer
- Achim Köhler - recording, mixing and mastering
