= Apocalypse (Primal Fear album) =

Studio album by Primal Fear
- Released: 10 August 2018
- Studio: Hansen Studios, Denmark
- Genre: Heavy metal, power metal
- Label: Frontiers Records

Primal Fear chronology
Rulebreaker (2016)	Apocalypse (2018)	Metal Commando (2020)

Singles from Apocalypse
- 1. "Hounds of Justice" Released: 22 May 2018; 2. "King of Madness" Released: 29 June 2018; 3. "The Ritual" Released: 3 August 2018

Professional ratings
Review scores
Source	Rating
Metal Hammer	7/7 stars

Apocalypse is the twelfth studio album by German heavy metal band Primal Fear. The album was released on 10 August 2018 via Frontiers Records. It is also the second and last album with drummer Francesco Jovino.

== Track listing ==
No.	Title	Length
1.	"Apocalypse"	1:44
2.	"New Rise"	4:13
3.	"The Ritual"	4:05
4.	"King of Madness"	4:25
5.	"Blood, Sweat & Fear"	4:55
6.	"Supernova"	5:21
7.	"Hail to the Fear"	5:05
8.	"Hounds of Justice"	3:51
9.	"The Beast"	3:42
10.	"Eye of the Storm"	8:00
11.	"Cannonball"	4:43
Total length:		50:04

Bonus tracks
No.	Title	Length
12.	"Fight Against All Evil"	4:25
13.	"Into the Fire"	4:33
14.	"My War Is Over"	4:41
Total length:		63:43

== Personnel ==
- Ralf Scheepers – vocals
- Mat Sinner – bass, vocals
- Magnus Karlsson – guitars, keyboards
- Alex Beyrodt – guitars
- Tom Naumann – guitars
- Francesco Jovino – drums

== Charts ==
Chart (2018)	Peak position
Austrian Albums (Ö3 Austria)	43
Belgian Albums (Ultratop Flanders)	47
Belgian Albums (Ultratop Wallonia)	65
Czech Albums (ČNS IFPI)	91
German Albums (Offizielle Top 100)	10
Swiss Albums (Schweizer Hitparade)	12
