= Unbreakable (Primal Fear album) =

Studio album by Primal Fear
- Released: 20 January 2012
- Recorded: 2011 at House of Music Studios, Winterbach, Germany
- Genres: Heavy metal, power metal, speed metal
- Label: Frontiers
- Producer: Mat Sinner

Primal Fear chronology
16.6 (Before the Devil Knows You're Dead) (2009)	Unbreakable (2012)	Delivering the Black (2014)

Singles from Delivering the Black
- 1. "Bad Guys Wear Black" Released: 5 December 2011

Professional ratings
Review scores
Source	Rating
Classic Rock	7/10 stars

Unbreakable is the ninth studio album by the German heavy metal band Primal Fear, and the first album with guitarist Alex Beyrodt. The album was released on 20 January 2012 in Europe, and 24 January in North America. Recording began at House of Music studios in Winterbach, Germany on 10 July 2011.

== Track listing ==
All tracks are written by Mat Sinner, Magnus Karlsson, Ralf Scheepers, except where noted.

No.	Title	Writer(s)	Length
1.	"Unbreakable (Part 1)" (Intro)		1:37
2.	"Strike"		4:39
3.	"Give 'Em Hell"		3:05
4.	"Bad Guys Wear Black"		3:31
5.	"And There Was Silence"		5:13
6.	"Metal Nation"	Sinner, Alex Beyrodt, Scheepers	5:11
7.	"Where Angels Die"		8:09
8.	"Unbreakable (Part 2)"		6:05
9.	"Marching Again"		5:41
10.	"Born Again"	Sinner, Karlsson, Scheepers, Ronny Milianowicz	4:48
11.	"Blaze of Glory"		3:56
12.	"Conviction"	Sinner, Beyrodt, Scheepers	3:49
Total length:			56:24

Japanese Bonus Tracks
No.	Title	Length
1.	"Night of the Jumps"	3:55
2.	"Born Again" (Acoustic Version)	4:48
Total length:		64:27

Digipak edition includes "Night of the Jumps" and a music video for "Bad Guys Wear Black".

== Personnel ==
Band members

- Ralf Scheepers - lead and backing vocals
- Magnus Karlsson - guitars, keyboards
- Alex Beyrodt - guitars
- Mat Sinner - bass, vocals, backing vocals and production
- Randy Black - drums

Additional musicians

- Erik Mårtensson - backing vocals
- Oliver Hartmann - backing vocals

== Production ==
- Jobert Mello - cover art, artwork
- Heiko Roith - photography
- Mat Sinner - producer
- Achim Köhler - mixing and mastering at Indiscreet Audio, Stuttgart, Germany
- Martin Müller - director ("Bad Guys Wear Black" music video)
