= Magnus Karlsson (musician) =

Swedish musician (born 1973)

- Born: 26 November 1973 (age 52); Sweden
- Genres: Heavy metal, hard rock, power metal, symphonic metal
- Occupation: Musician
- Instruments: Guitar, bass, keyboards
- Years active: 1989–present

Magnus Karlsson (born 26 November 1973) is a Swedish heavy metal musician, songwriter and producer. He is currently a session musician and songwriter of the band Primal Fear, as well as for other projects like his own Free Fall.

== Biography ==
Magnus attended school to study classical guitar when he was 10 years old. Later on he was very much into bands such as Iron Maiden, Dio, Judas Priest and Black Sabbath. His influences as a guitarist were Steve Morse, Steve Vai and Allan Holdsworth. He has played in various metal and fusion bands early on and developed a style which mixes metal and folk music.

His first critically acclaimed musical project was with the band Last Tribe, which has released three full-length albums.

In 2004, Magnus started to work as a session musician in a project put together by Frontiers Records, which had the intention to have two acclaimed heavy metal vocalists singing together as a duet. The project ended up featuring powerhouse vocalists Russell Allen (Symphony X) and Jørn Lande (ex-Masterplan) and was simply called Allen/Lande. The project released its first three albums with all music and the majority of lyrics written by Magnus Karlsson, featuring a variety of hard rock and heavy metal songs with a progressive metal touch.

In the same year he also started to write music for a project with singer Tony Harnell (TNT), drummer John Macaluso (Ark, TNT, Yngwie Malmsteen) and bassist Fabrizio Grossi (Steve Vai) that would later on become the band Starbreaker.

In 2008, he worked with Magnum vocalist Bob Catley on his solo album Immortal writing all the songs himself .

The same year, Magnus joined German metal band Primal Fear making a big contribution to the band's songwriting. He also teamed up with the band's bassist and leader Mat Sinner to work in a number of projects released by Frontiers Records, such as Kiske/Somerville (another singer-duet project, featuring ex-Helloween singer Michael Kiske and American singer and vocal coach Amanda Somerville) and the first solo album by Primal Fear frontman Ralf Scheepers.

In 2013 it was announced that Magnus Karlsson would release his first solo musical project called Free Fall on 11 June in North America and 14 June in Europe by Frontiers Records. It features many guest singers who worked with Magnus before, including Russell Allen, Ralf Scheepers, Tony Harnell, Rickard Bengtsson (former bandmate from Last Tribe), Mark Boals (who worked with Magnus in the project The Codex), Mike Andersson (who worked with Magnus in the project Planet Alliance) and other guests like David Readman (Pink Cream 69, Voodoo Circle), Rick Altzi (At Vance, Masterplan) and Herman Saming (ACT). Magnus also sings three tracks on the album himself and Daniel Flores (who also worked with Magnus in the project The Codex) recorded the drums.

Magnus also wrote songs for the melodic hard rock project Place Vendome, 'My Guardian Angel' from the album Streets of Fire, 'Break Out' from the album Thunder in the Distance and 'Falling Star' from the album Close to the Sun.

The second Free Fall album has been announced to be released in 2015. It's called Kingdom of Rock and features the following guests: Jørn Lande, Tony Martin (ex-Black Sabbath), Joe Lynn Turner (ex-Rainbow, ex-Deep Purple), Jakob Samuel (The Poodles, also worked with Magnus in the band Midnight Sun), Harry Hess (Harem Scarem), Rebecca De La Moite, and once again Tony Harnell, Rick Altzi and David Readman, the last three also sang in the first album. Jaime Salazar (who worked with Magnus on bands Last Tribe, Planet Alliance, Midnight Sun and the Allen/Lande project) recorded the drums. The album's release date is 6 November 2015.

In 2017, it was announced another new project featuring songwriting, production and playing from Magnus Karlsson called The Ferrymen. The self-titled album also features drummer Mike Terrana (Vision Divine, Avalanch) and singer Ronnie Romero (Lords of Black, Rainbow).

In 2018, Magnus and Tony Harnell reunited to record the third album of Starbreaker which is titled Dysphoria and was released on 25 January 2019. It also features bassist Jonni Lightfoot and drummer Anders Köllerfors.

=== Heart Healer ===
Heart Healer is a project with the intention to create the first metal opera only with female singers, with Magnus Karlsson on songwriting and production. Self-named album Heart Healer released on 12 March 2021 via Frontiers Records.

Current band members: Magnus Karlsson, Erika Sävström Engman, Daniel Tengberg, Anders Köllerfors

The invited singers are Adrienne Cowan (Seven Spires, Sascha Paeth's Masters of Ceremony, Avantasia, Winds of Plague), Netta Laurenne (Smackbound, Laurenne/Louhimo), Youmna Jreissati (Ostura), Ailyn (Her Chariot Awaits, ex-Sirenia), Noora Louhimo (Battle Beast), Margarita Monet (Edge of Paradise) and Anette Olzon (The Dark Element, ex-Nightwish).

The album's plot follows the title character (performed by Cowan) after she wakes up with no memory and with the ability to heal people with the touch of her bare hands, though that comes at the gradual cost of her own strength. As the story progresses, she meets people willing to help her, use her powers or hunt her.

The album has been released on CD, color vinyl and digital formats. On 25 January 2021, a video for "Into the Unknown" was released.

Karlsson explained in his words, "my interest in orchestral music has been growing increasingly during the years. I wanted to mix the epic and dramatic orchestral sound with metal and produce something without any limits and rules. At the end of 2019, I started to work on ideas and tried new sounds and arrangements with the goal to create something dramatic, epic, and beautiful. This is easily my biggest and most demanding work ever. First the music with big arrangements and orchestra. Then all the singers and the need to find the right parts for everyone to make it as good as possible. Finally, mixing it all together in an interesting story about the 'heart healer'. I have to say, if I didn't work with such great and professional people it would be impossible to make this happen!"

== Discography ==
=== Magnus Karlsson's Free Fall ===
- Free Fall (2013)
- Kingdom of Rock (2015)
- We Are The Night (2020)
- Hunt the Flame (2023)

=== Midnight Sun ===
- Nemesis (1999)
- Metal Machine (2001)

=== Last Tribe ===
- The Ritual (2001)
- Witch Dance (2002)
- The Uncrowned (2003)

=== Starbreaker ===
- Starbreaker (2005)
- Love's Dying Wish (2008)
- Dysphoria (2019)

=== Allen/Lande ===
- The Battle (2005)
- The Revenge (2007)
- The Showdown (2010)

=== Tony O'Hora ===
- Escape into the Sun (2006)

=== Greenhouse ===
- Glass of Beer (2006)

=== Planet Alliance ===
- Planet Alliance (2006)

=== The Codex ===
- The Codex (2007)

=== Bob Catley ===
- Immortal (2008)

=== Primal Fear ===
- New Religion (2007) – lead guitars on track 3
- 16.6 (2009)
- Unbreakable (2012)
- Delivering The Black (2014)
- Rulebreaker (2016)
- Apocalypse (2018)
- Metal Commando (2020)
- Code Red (2023)
- Domination (2025)

=== Place Vendome ===
- Streets of Fire (2009)
- Close to the Sun (2017) – guitar solo on track 8

=== Kiske/Somerville ===
- Kiske/Somerville (2010)
- City of Heroes (2015)

=== Ralf Scheepers ===
- Scheepers (2011)

=== Kimball Jamison ===
- Kimball Jamison (2011)

=== Phenomena ===
- Awakening (2012)

=== The Ferrymen ===
- The Ferrymen (2017)
- A New Evil (2019)
- One More River To Cross (2022)
- Iron Will (2025)

=== Allen/Olzon ===
- Worlds Apart (2020)
- Army of Dreamers (2022)

=== Heart Healer ===
- Heart Healer (2021)

=== Anette Olzon ===
- Strong (2021)
- Rapture (2024)

=== Ginevra ===
- We Belong To The Stars (2022)
- Beyond Tomorrow (2025)

=== Sinner ===
- Boom Bang Goodbye (2026)
