= 16.6 (Before the Devil Knows You're Dead) =

Studio album by Primal Fear
- Released: 22 May 2009
- Recorded: November 2008 – January 2009
- Studios: House of Music Studios, Winterbach, Germany
- Genres: Heavy metal, power metal, speed metal
- Label: Frontiers
- Producer: Mat Sinner

Primal Fear chronology
New Religion (2007)	16.6 (Before the Devil Knows You're Dead) (2009)	Unbreakable (2012)

Professional ratings
Review scores
Source	Rating
Hard Rock Hideout	(8.0/10)

16.6 (Before the Devil Knows You're Dead) is the eighth studio album by the German heavy metal band Primal Fear. It is the first album by the band not featuring longtime guitarist Stefan Leibing and the first album featuring new guitarist Magnus Karlsson, and the final album with guitarist Henny Wolter. The band says of the album that it "includes a lot of the vibe of our very first albums" and also "a lot of fresh and new elements".

A music video was made for "Six Times Dead (16.6)".

== Track listing ==
All songs written by Mat Sinner, Henny Wolter, Magnus Karlsson and Ralf Scheepers

No.	Title	Length
1.	"Before the Devil Knows You're Dead" (Intro)	0:49
2.	"Riding the Eagle"	4:58
3.	"Six Times Dead (16.6)"	4:00
4.	"Black Rain"	6:07
5.	"Under the Radar"	5:25
6.	"5.0 / Torn"	7:13
7.	"Soar"	4:16
8.	"Killbound"	4:15
9.	"No Smoke Without Fire"	4:54
10.	"Night After Night"	5:03
11.	"Smith & Wesson"	4:47
12.	"The Exorcist"	4:49
13.	"Hands of Time"	4:23
Total length:		60:44

Digipak Bonus Tracks
No.	Title	Length
14.	"Cry Havoc"	4:00
15.	"Scream"	4:40
Total length:		68:24

Japanese Bonus Track
No.	Title	Length
14.	"No Smoke Without Fire" (Remix)	3:29
Total length:		64:23

Note

- An enhanced edition release contains the "Six Times Dead (16.6)" music video

== Credits ==
- Ralf Scheepers – vocals
- Henny Wolter – guitars, vocals on "Hands of Time"
- Magnus Karlsson – guitars, vocals on "Hands of Time"
- Mat Sinner – bass guitar, backing vocals, vocals on "Hands of Time"
- Randy Black – drums

Additional Musicians

- Dennis Ward – backing vocals

== Production ==
- Ted Jensen – Mastering
- Jack Breyer – Mixing (additional)
- Mat Sinner – Producer
- Sonja Müller – Mixing (additional)
- Katja Piolka – Cover art, Photography
- Achim "Akeem" Köhler – Mixing
- Dennis Ward – Producer (additional), Engineering
