= Kingdom of Rock =

2015 album by Magnus Karlsson

Studio album by Magnus Karlsson's Free Fall
- Released: 6 November 2015
- Recorded: 2014–2015
- Genre: Hard rock, heavy metal, progressive metal
- Label: Frontiers Records
- Producer: Magnus Karlsson

Magnus Karlsson's Free Fall chronology
Free Fall (2013)	Kingdom of Rock (2015)	We Are the Night (2020)

Kingdom of Rock is the second full-length studio album by Swedish heavy metal songwriter, guitarist, multi-instrumentalist and producer Magnus Karlsson.

It was released under the project name Magnus Karlsson's Free Fall on 6 November 2015 by Frontiers Records.

Like the previous album, it features many guest singers who worked with Magnus on his many projects, including Jørn Lande (one of the singers of the duo Allen/Lande), Jakob Samuel (who worked with Magnus in the band Midnight Sun) and once again Tony Harnell, Rick Altzi and David Readman, the last three also sang on Free Fall's debut album. The other singers featured are some of Magnus's biggest influences and colleagues in the music business such as Tony Martin (ex-Black Sabbath), Joe Lynn Turner (ex-Rainbow, ex-Deep Purple), Harry Hess (Harem Scarem) and Rebecca De La Moite. Magnus also sings three tracks on the album himself (including the bonus track) and Jaime Salazar (who worked with Magnus on bands Last Tribe, Planet Alliance, Midnight Sun and the Allen/Lande project) recorded the drums.

== Track listing ==
All tracks are written by Magnus Karlsson, except "When The Sky Falls", written by Magnus Karlsson and Tony Martin

No.	Title	Vocalist	Length
1.	"Kingdom of Rock"	Jørn Lande	5:25
2.	"Out Of The Dark"	Jakob Samuel	4:23
3.	"No Control"	Joe Lynn Turner	4:37
4.	"When The Sky Falls"	Tony Martin	5:58
5.	"Angel Of The Night"	David Readman	4:12
6.	"I Am Coming For You"	Magnus Karlsson	5:29
7.	"Another Life"	Rick Altzi	4:54
8.	"Never Look Away"	Tony Harnell	5:06
9.	"A Heart So Cold"	Harry Hess	4:40
10.	"The Right Moment"	Rebecca De La Motte	4:48
11.	"Walk This Road Alone"	Magnus Karlsson	5:16
12.	"No Control (Acoustic Version)"	Magnus Karlsson	4:44

== Personnel ==
- Magnus Karlsson - Guitar, Bass Guitar, Keyboards & Producer, Backing vocals, Lead vocals on tracks 6, 11 & 12
- Jaime Salazar - Drums

Guests Singers

- Jørn Lande (Allen-Lande, ex-Masterplan, ex-Ark, ex-Vagabond, ex-The Snakes, ex-Beyond Twilight) - lead vocals on track 1
- Jakob Samuel (The Poodles, Midnight Sun, ex-Talisman) - lead vocals on track 2
- Joe Lynn Turner (Sunstorm, ex-Rainbow, ex-Deep Purple, ex-Yngwie Malmsteen band) - lead vocals on track 3
- Tony Martin (ex-Black Sabbath) - lead vocals on track 4
- David Readman (Pink Cream 69, ex-Adagio, ex-Voodoo Circle) - lead vocals on track 5
- Rick Altzi (At Vance, Masterplan, ex-Thunderstone) - lead vocals on track 7
- Tony Harnell (TNT, Starbreaker, Westworld) - lead vocals on track 8
- Harry Hess (Harem Scarem, First Signal) - lead vocals on track 9
- Rebecca De La Motte - lead vocals on track 10
