= Jaws of Death (album) =

Studio album by Primal Fear
- Released: 10 June 1999
- Genres: Heavy metal, power metal
- Length: 49:39
- Label: Nuclear Blast

Primal Fear chronology
| Primal Fear (1998) | Jaws of Death (1999) | Nuclear Fire (2001) |

Professional ratings
Review scores
| Source | Rating |
|---|---|
| AllMusic | 4/5 stars |

Jaws of Death is the second album by the German heavy metal band Primal Fear, released in 1999. The album was re-issued in 2005 by Nuclear Blast in a multibox containing the 1998 album Primal Fear.

== Track listing ==
| No. | Title | Length |
|---|---|---|
| 1. | "Jaws of Death" (Intro) | 0:22 |
| 2. | "Final Embrace" | 5:08 |
| 3. | "Save a Prayer" | 3:37 |
| 4. | "Church of Blood" | 5:14 |
| 5. | "Into the Future" | 4:06 |
| 6. | "Under Your Spell" | 5:36 |
| 7. | "Play to Kill" | 4:01 |
| 8. | "Nation in Fear" | 5:25 |
| 9. | "When the Night Comes" | 5:15 |
| 10. | "Fight to Survive" | 6:00 |
| 11. | "Hatred in My Soul" | 4:55 |
| Total length: | | 49:39 |

Limited edition bonus track
| No. | Title | Length |
|---|---|---|
| 12. | "Kill the King" (Rainbow cover) | 4:32 |
| Total length: | | 54:11 |

Japanese edition bonus track
| No. | Title | Length |
|---|---|---|
| 12. | "Horrorscope" | 5:44 |
| Total length: | | 55:23 |

2010 remastered bonus tracks
| No. | Title | Length |
|---|---|---|
| 12. | "Kill the King" (Rainbow cover) | 4:32 |
| 13. | "Horrorscope" | 5:05 |
| Total length: | | 59:16 |

== Credits ==
- Ralf Scheepers – vocals
- Tom Naumann – guitars/keyboards
- Stefan Leibing – guitars
- Mat Sinner – bass guitar/keyboards/vocals
- Klaus Sperling – drums

=== Production ===
- Mat Sinner – Producer
- Stefan Leibing – Engineering
- Achim "Akeem" Köhler – Engineering, Mixing, Mastering
- Ingmar Schelzel – Engineering (additional)
- Mitch Howell – Engineering (additional)
- Robert Valdez – Engineering (additional)
- Stephan Lohrmann – Cover art
- Rainer Ill – Photography
- Matthias Moser – Photography
- Martin Fust – Photography
