= Metal Commando =

Studio album by Primal Fear
- Released: 24 July 2020
- Studio: Hansen Studios, Denmark; Stuntguitar Music, Sweden; Fear Studios; Level 10; Backyard Studios
- Genre: Heavy metal, power metal
- Length: 56:58
- Label: Nuclear Blast

Primal Fear chronology
Apocalypse (2018)	Metal Commando (2020)	Code Red (2023)

Singles from Metal Commando
- 1. "Along Came the Devil" Released: 15 May 2020; 2. "I Am Alive" Released: 19 June 2020; 3. "Hear Me Calling" Released: 24 July 2020

Professional ratings
Review scores
Source	Rating
Louder Sound	4/5 stars
Distorted Sound	9/10

Metal Commando is the thirteenth studio album by German heavy metal band Primal Fear. The album was released on 24 July 2020 via Nuclear Blast. It is also the first album with drummer Michael Ehré.

== Track listing ==
Metal Commando track listing
No.	Title	Length
1.	"I Am Alive"	4:34
2.	"Along Came the Devil"	4:21
3.	"Halo"	4:19
4.	"Hear Me Calling"	4:39
5.	"The Lost and the Forgotten"	4:08
6.	"My Name Is Fear"	4:04
7.	"I Will Be Gone"	4:26
8.	"Raise Your Fists"	3:52
9.	"Howl of the Banshee"	4:54
10.	"Afterlife"	4:29
11.	"Infinity"	13:12
Total length:		56:58

Digipak bonus tracks
No.	Title	Length
12.	"Rising Fear"	1:39
13.	"Leave Me Alone"	4:04
14.	"Second to None"	4:12
15.	"Crucify Me"	4:06
Total length:		70:59

== Personnel ==
All information from the album booklet.

Primal Fear

- Ralf Scheepers – lead and backing vocals
- Mat Sinner – bass, vocals, producer
- Magnus Karlsson – guitars, keyboards
- Alex Beyrodt – guitars
- Tom Naumann – guitars
- Michael Ehré – drums

Production

- Jacob Hansen – engineering, mixing, mastering
- Stephan Lohrmann – cover art
- Stefan Heilemann – layout

== Charts ==
Chart performance for Metal Commando
Chart (2020)	Peak position
Austrian Albums (Ö3 Austria)	28
Belgian Albums (Ultratop Flanders)	65
Belgian Albums (Ultratop Wallonia)	26
Czech Albums (ČNS IFPI)	66
German Albums (Offizielle Top 100)	7
Hungarian Albums (MAHASZ)	15
Spanish Albums (PROMUSICAE)	57
Swiss Albums (Schweizer Hitparade)	6
