= Devil's Ground =

Studio album by Primal Fear
- Released: 23 February 2004
- Recorded: September – November 2003 at House of Music Studios, Germany
- Genre: Heavy metal, power metal
- Label: Nuclear Blast
- Producer: Mat Sinner, Achim Kohler

Primal Fear chronology
Black Sun (2002)	Devil's Ground (2004)	Seven Seals (2005)

Singles from Devil's Ground
- 1. "Metal Is Forever" Released: 10 January 2004

Professional ratings
Review scores
Source	Rating
Allmusic	link
Lords of Metal	link

Devil's Ground is the 5th album by German power metal band Primal Fear. It was released on 23 February 2004.

Music videos were made for "Metal Is Forever" and "The Healer".

== Track listing ==
All songs written by Mat Sinner, Ralf Scheepers, Stefan Leibing and Tom Naumann except where noted

No.	Title	Writer(s)	Length
1.	"Metal Is Forever"		4:46
2.	"Suicide and Mania"		4:03
3.	"Visions of Fate"		4:50
4.	"Sea of Flames"		4:01
5.	"The Healer"		6:40
6.	"Sacred Illusion"	Sinner, Scheepers, Leibing, Naumann, Black, Vinder	4:03
7.	"In Metal"		5:15
8.	"Soulchaser"		4:52
9.	"Colony 13"		3:55
10.	"Wings of Desire"		6:46
11.	"Heart of a Brave"		4:55
12.	"Devil's Ground"		2:09
Total length:			56:15

Bonus track on most editions
No.	Title	Length
13.	"Die Young" (Black Sabbath cover)	4:05
Total length:		60:20

Limited edition bonus tracks
No.	Title	Length
14.	"Metal is Forever" (5.1 mix – DVD Audio Track)	4:48
15.	"The Healer" (5.1 mix – DVD Audio Track)	6:33
Total length:		71:41

Japanese edition bonus track
No.	Title	Length
14.	"The Rover" (Led Zeppelin cover)	4:46
Total length:		65:06

2010 bonus tracks
No.	Title	Length
14.	"Metal Is Forever" (5.1 mix – DVD Audio Track)	4:48
15.	"The Healer" (5.1 mix – DVD Audio Track)	6:33
16.	"The Rover" (Led Zeppelin cover)	4:46
Total length:		76:27

== Personnel ==
- Ralf Scheepers – lead vocals
- Stefan Leibing – guitars
- Tom Naumann – guitars
- Mat Sinner – bass guitar, vocals
- Randy Black – drums

=== Production ===
- Mat Sinner – Producer
- Achim "Akeem" Köhler – Producer, Engineering, Mixing, Mastering
- Leo Hao – Cover art
- Ralf Scheepers – Producer
- Randy Black – Producer
- Tom Naumann – Producer
- Stefan Leibing – Producer
- Ingmar Schelzel – Engineering
- Thomas Ewerhard – Layout
- Alex Kuehr – Photography
