= Rule Breaker =

Rule Breaker, The Rule Breaker, or rulebreaker may refer to:

- Rulebreaker, a 2016 album from Primal Fear
- "Rule Breaker", a song by Ashlee Simpson from Bittersweet World, 2008
- The Genius: Rule Breaker, the second season the South Korean reality show The Genius
- Rule Breaker: Destroyer of all Talismans, the talisman of Caster, a character in the adult visual novel Fate/stay night
- "The Rule Breaker", a season 2 episode of I Married a Mobster
- Rule Breaker, a 2014 novel by Lora Leigh
- Rulebreaker Award, awarded by Billboard Women in Music
- Rule Breakers (film), 2025 American film
