= Level 10 (band) =

International metal supergroup

- Genres: Heavy metal
- Years active: 2012–present
- Label: Frontiers
- Members: Mat Sinner; Randy Black; Alex Beyrodt; Roland Grapow; Alessandro Del Vecchio; Russell Allen
- Website: Official website

Level 10 is an international heavy metal supergroup formed in 2012 by vocalist Russell Allen and bassist/producer Mat Sinner.

Allen and Sinner, wanting to work together, have been united for the new project of the President of Frontiers, Serafino Perugino. The final lineup for the album, including drummer Randy Black and guitar player Alex Beyrodt of Primal Fear, Roland Grapow of Masterplan and Alessandro Del Vecchio (Hardline, Voodoo Circle) on keyboards.

On 23 January 2015, Chapter One, their first and only album, was released.

== Discography ==
- Chapter One (2015)

== Band members ==
- Russell Allen – vocals (2012–present)
- Mat Sinner – bass (2012–present)
- Randy Black – drums (2013–present)
- Alex Beyrodt – guitar (2013–present)
- Roland Grapow – guitar (2014–present)
- Alessandro Del Vecchio – keyboards (2014–present)
