= Scheepers (album) =

Studio album by Ralf Scheepers
- Released: 18 February 2011
- Genre: Power metal, heavy metal
- Length: 52:32
- Label: Frontiers Records
- Producer: Mat Sinner, Ralf Scheepers

Scheepers is the debut solo album from Ralf Scheepers, lead vocalist of the German heavy metal band Primal Fear.

== Track listing ==
1. "Locked in the Dungeon" - 4:08
2. "Remission of Sin" - 4:09
3. "Cyberfreak" - 3:45
4. "The Fall" - 4:05
5. "Doomsday" - 6:28
6. "Saints of Rock" (Tyran' Pace cover) - 4:32
7. "Before the Dawn" (Judas Priest cover) - 3:06
8. "Back on the Track" - 4:40
9. "Dynasty" - 3:57
10. "The Pain of the Accused" - 6:18
11. "Play with Fire" - 4:08
12. "Compassion" - 3:16

== Credits ==
- Ralf Scheepers - Lead & Backing Vocals; Acoustic Guitar; Keyboards
- Magnus Karlsson: Lead Guitars; Guitars; Banjo; Accordion; Keyboards
- Sander Gommans: Lead Guitar, Guitars
- Mat Sinner: Bass, Keyboards
- Snowy Shaw: Drums

Guest Appearances:

- Tim "Ripper" Owens: Lead Vocals on "Remission of Sin"
- Kai Hansen; Mike Chlasciak; Alex Beyrodt; Victor Smolski: Lead Guitars
