= Rulebreaker =

Studio album by Primal Fear
- Released: 20 January 2016 (JP); 22 January 2016 (US, EU)
- Studio: Hansen Studios, Denmark
- Genre: Heavy metal, power metal, speed metal
- Label: Frontiers Records

Primal Fear chronology
Delivering the Black (2014)	Rulebreaker (2016)	Apocalypse (2018)

Singles from Rulebreaker
- 1. "The End Is Near" Released: 16 November 2015

Professional ratings
Review scores
Source	Rating
Metal Storm	8.6/10 stars
Ultimate Guitar	7.3/10 stars

Rulebreaker is the eleventh studio album from the German heavy metal band Primal Fear. The album was released on January 22, 2016. It is the first album to feature Francesco Jovino on drums. It also marks the return of original guitarist, Tom Naumann, for his third stint with the band, making it the band's first album with three guitar players.

Music videos were made for "Angels of Mercy" and "The End Is Near".

== Track listing ==
All lyrics are written by Mat Sinner, Magnus Karlsson and Ralf Scheepers, except where noted.

No.	Title	Writer(s)	Length
1.	"Angels of Mercy"		3:35
2.	"The End Is Near"		4:27
3.	"Bullets & Tears"		3:05
4.	"Rulebreaker"		4:38
5.	"In Metal We Trust"		3:34
6.	"We Walk Without Fear"		10:45
7.	"At War with the World"		4:06
8.	"The Devil in Me"		4:44
9.	"Constant Heart"		4:50
10.	"The Sky Is Burning"		4:45
11.	"Raving Mad"	Sinner, Karlsson, Scheepers, Naumann	3:14
Total length:			51:43

Digipak bonus tracks
No.	Title	Length
12.	"Final Call"	4:04
13.	"Don't Say You've Never Been Warned"	4:23
Total length:		60:10

== Personnel ==
- Ralf Scheepers – vocals
- Mat Sinner – bass, vocals
- Magnus Karlsson – guitars, keyboards
- Alex Beyrodt – guitars
- Tom Naumann – guitars
- Francesco Jovino – drums
