= Reigning Phoenix Music =

German-American record label

- Founded: July 18, 2023; 3 years ago
- Founder: Gerardo Martinez; Sven Bogner
- Genre: Various, with a focus on heavy metal and extreme metal
- Location: Neuhausen-Hamberg, Germany; Los Angeles, California, U.S.
- Official website: reigningphoenixmusic.com

Reigning Phoenix Music (RPM) is a German-American record label, specialising in extreme metal and heavy metal.

== History ==
Reigning Phoenix Music was launched on July 18, 2023, by Gerardo Martinez, former manager of Nuclear Blast America, and German entrepreneur Sven Bogner. Shortly after its formation, the label signed a one-album deal with the death metal band Deicide. In October 2023, Jochen Richert, ex-managing director of AFM Records and Soulfood Distribution, joined Reigning Phoenix's management team.

In January 2024, RPM announced that it would be integrating Atomic Fire Records and sub-label Fire Flash Records—along with the rosters of both labels—into their label.

== Artists ==
Per the Reigning Phoenix Music website:

- The 69 Eyes
- 8 Kalacas
- All for Metal
- Agnostic Front
- Amorphis
- Angra
- Arion
- Arka'n Asrafokor
- Athena XIX
- Belphegor
- Bloodywood
- Brainstorm
- Cemetary
- Coreleoni
- Crimson Veil
- Curse of Cain
- Cyhra
- Deicide
- Eleine
- Enemy Inside
- The Eternal
- Ex Deo
- Fleshcrawl
- Ghostseeker
- God Dethroned
- Helloween
- Incite
- Inner Wish
- Induction
- Jag Panzer
- Kerry King
- Lancer
- Lutharo
- Lordi
- Master's Call
- Meshuggah
- Mezzrow
- Mystic Circle
- Nevermore
- Oblivion Protocol
- Octoploid
- Onslaught
- Opeth
- Orden Ogan
- Power Paladin
- Primal Fear
- Rage Behind
- Rise of the Northstar
- Riot V
- Ruthless
- Sebastian Bach
- Seventh Storm
- Siena Root
- Silver Lake by Esa Holopainen
- Sinner
- Skull Fist
- Sonata Arctica
- Tailgunner
- The Modern Age Slavery
- Theocracy
- Tungsten
- U.D.O.
- Udo Dirkschneider
- Voidgazer
- White Stones
- Wolfheart
