= Primal Fear (album) =

Studio album by Primal Fear
- Released: 2 February 1998
- Recorded: 1997 at Spacepark Studios, House of Music, Winterbach, Germany
- Genres: Heavy metal, power metal
- Label: Nuclear Blast
- Producers: Mat Sinner, Ralf Scheepers, Tom Naumann

Primal Fear chronology
Primal Fear (1998)	Jaws of Death (1999)

Professional ratings
Review scores
Source	Rating
AllMusic	2/5 stars
Scream Magazine	5/6

Primal Fear is the debut studio album by the German power metal band Primal Fear, released in 1998. The album was re-issued in 2005 by Nuclear Blast in a multibox containing the 1999 album Jaws of Death.

== Track listing ==
No.	Title	Length
1.	"Primal Fear" (Intro)	0:34
2.	"Chainbreaker"	4:25
3.	"Silver & Gold"	3:11
4.	"Promised Land"	4:23
5.	"Formula One"	4:56
6.	"Dollars"	3:57
7.	"Nine Lives"	3:06
8.	"Tears of Rage"	6:47
9.	"Speedking" (Deep Purple cover)	3:59
10.	"Battalions of Hate"	3:49
11.	"Running in the Dust"	4:37
12.	"Thunderdome"	3:45
Total length:		47:29

2010 remastered bonus track
No.	Title	Length
13.	"Breaker" (Accept cover)	3:30
Total length:		50:59

== Personnel ==
Band members

- Ralf Scheepers – vocals
- Tom Naumann – guitars, keyboards
- Mat Sinner – bass, keyboards, backing vocals
- Klaus Sperling – drums

Additional musicians

- Kai Hansen – lead guitar on "Formula One", "Dollars" and "Speedking"
- Frank Roessler – additional keyboards

Production

- Stephan Lohrmann – cover art
- Mat Sinner – producer
- Achim "Akeem" Köhler – engineering
- Tom Naumann – co-producer
- Ralf Scheepers – co-producer
- Rainer Ill – photography
- H. P. Pietschmann – art direction
