= Black Sun (Primal Fear album) =

Studio album by Primal Fear
- Released: 24 April 2002
- Genre: Heavy metal, power metal
- Label: Nuclear Blast
- Producer: Achim Kohler, Mat Sinner, Primal Fear

Primal Fear chronology
Nuclear Fire (2001)	Black Sun (2002)	Devil's Ground (2004)

Professional ratings
Review scores
Source	Rating
AllMusic	link

Black Sun is the fourth studio release and first concept album by German power metal band Primal Fear.

A music video was made for "Armageddon".

In 2017, Loudwire ranked it as the 19th best power metal album of all time.

== Album concept ==
The record is themed around a space exploration mission. A team of astronauts visit a new, never before seen planet, and their craft ends up blowing up in the process of reentry into the Earth's atmosphere. The person or thing they are speaking to in 'Armageddon' is often considered by fans to be the eagle that appears on the covers of the majority of their albums.

== Track listing ==
All songs written by Primal Fear.

No.	Title	Length
1.	"Countdown to Insanity"	1:43
2.	"Black Sun"	4:02
3.	"Armageddon"	4:05
4.	"Lightyears from Home"	4:40
5.	"Revolution"	4:02
6.	"Fear"	4:20
7.	"Mind Control"	4:58
8.	"Magic Eye"	5:16
9.	"Mind Machine"	5:37
10.	"Silence"	4:39
11.	"We Go Down"	5:53
12.	"Cold Day in Hell"	4:10
13.	"Controlled"	3:36
Total length:		57:01

== Personnel ==
- Ralf Scheepers – lead vocals
- Stefan Leibing – guitars
- Henny Wolter – guitars
- Mat Sinner – bass, vocals
- Klaus Sperling – drums

Additional Musicians

- "Metal" Mike Chlasciak – additional guitar on "Fear" and "Controlled"

=== Production ===
- Achim "Akeem" Köhler – Producer, Engineering, Mixing, Mastering
- Mat Sinner – Producer
- Justin Leeah – Engineering (additional)
- Ralf Scheepers – Producer
- Klaus Sperling – Producer
- Stefan Leibing – Producer
- Henny Wolter – Producer
- Stephan Lohrmann – Cover art
- Thomas Ewerhard – Artwork
- Roland Guth – Photography
