= Touch of Sin =

Touch of Sin may refer to:

- Touch of Sin (album), 1985 album by German heavy metal band Sinner
- Touch of Sin 2, 2013 album by German heavy metal band Sinner
- A Touch of Sin, 2013 Chinese crime film
