= Heart Healer (album) =

Studio album by Heart Healer
- Released: 12 March 2021
- Length: 63:48
- Label: Frontiers Records

Heart Healer (full title: Heart Healer: the Metal Opera by Magnus Karlsson) is the first studio album by metal opera project Heart Healer, formed by Swedish multi-instrumentalist Magnus Karlsson, released on 12 March 2021 via Frontiers Records.

The invited singers were:

- Adrienne Cowan (Seven Spires, Sascha Paeth's Masters of Ceremony, Avantasia, Winds of Plague)
- Ailyn (Her Chariot Awaits, Trail of Tears, ex-Sirenia)
- Anette Olzon (The Dark Element, ex-Nightwish)
- Margarita Monet (Edge of Paradise)
- Netta Laurenne (Smackbound, Laurenne/Louhimo)
- Noora Louhimo (Battle Beast, Laurenne/Louhimo)
- Youmna Jreissati (Ostura)

The album's plot follows the title character (performed by Cowan) after she wakes up with no memory and with the ability to heal people with the touch of her bare hands, though that comes at the gradual cost of her own strength. As the story progresses, she meets people willing to help her, use her powers or hunt her.

The album has been released on CD, color vinyl and digital formats. On 25 January 2021, a video for "Into the Unknown" was released.

== Track listing ==
No.	Title	Vocalist(s)	Length
1.	"Awake"	Adrienne Cowan	7:41
2.	"Come out of the Shadows"	Youmna Jreissati, Netta Laurenne, Margarita Monet	6:05
3.	"Who Can Stand All Alone"	Anette Olzon, Cowan	5:59
4.	"Back to Life"	Monet, Cowan, Ailyn Gimenez	5:37
5.	"Into the Unknown"	Noora Louhimo	7:21
6.	"When the Fire Burns Out"	Laurenne, Jreissati, Gimenez	5:14
7.	"Evil's Around the Corner"	Louhimo, Cowan	5:19
8.	"Mesmerized"	Olzon	5:17
9.	"Weaker"	Cowan	6:40
10.	"This is Not the End"	Cowan, Gimenez, Jreissati, Laurenne, Louhimo, Monet, Olzon	6:35
Total length:			63:48

Japan edition bonus track
No.	Title	Length
11.	"When the Fire Burns Out" (Orchestra Remix)	5:32
Total length:		66:08

== Charts ==
Chart performance for Heart Healer
Chart (2021)	Peak position
Swiss Albums (Schweizer Hitparade)	47

== Personnel ==
Per source

- Magnus Karlsson - guitar, bass, keyboards
- Anders Köllerfors - drums
- Daniel Tengberg - cello
- Erika Sävström Engman - violin

Vocalists

- Adrienne Cowan (Seven Spires, Light & Shade, Masters of Ceremony, Winds of Plague, Avantasia (Live))
- Ailyn Gimenez (Trail of Tears, Her Chariot Awaits, Ex-Sirenia)
- Youmna Jreissati (Ostura)
- Netta Laurenne (Smackbound, Laurenne/Louhimo)
- Noora Louhimo (Battle Beast, Laurenne/Louhimo, Noora Louhimo Experience)
- Margarita Monet (Edge of Paradise)
- Anette Olzon (Anette Olzon, Allen/Olzon, The Dark Element, Alyson Avenue, Ex-Nightwish)
