= Out in the Fields (song) =

Single by Gary Moore and Phil Lynott

from the album Run for Cover
- B-side: "Military Man"
- Released: 6 May 1985 (UK)
- Genre: Heavy metal
- Length: 4:18
- Label: 10
- Songwriter: Gary Moore
- Producer: Peter Collins

Gary Moore singles chronology
"Shapes of Things" (1984)	"Out in the Fields" (1985)	"Empty Rooms" (1985)

Official audio
- "Out in the Fields" on YouTube

"Out in the Fields" is a song by Irish musicians Gary Moore and Phil Lynott, who had previously been bandmates in Thin Lizzy. Written by Moore and released as a single in 1985, the song was also featured on his album Run for Cover in the same year. It is about the Troubles in Northern Ireland.

The song performed well commercially, reaching No. 3 in the Irish Singles Chart and No. 5 on the UK Singles Chart, making it the highest-charting single for both of the performers. "Out in the Fields" was also one of the last recordings made by Phil Lynott before his death on 4 January 1986.

Moore has described "Out in the Fields" as an "anti-war song". He told Record Mirror in 1985: "It says that killing is wrong whether you're black, white, yellow or purple. It's wrong for anybody to get a bullet for something they believe in." Moore felt that Lynott's voice would suit the song and asked him to team up to record and promote it. They took what Moore described as a "very modern and sophisticated approach" to recording it.

== Critical reception ==
Upon its release, Mick Wall of Kerrang! described "Out in the Fields" as a "fabulously hard and driving rock single", with Moore "croon[ing] like a sheep-killing dog and play[ing] his axe like the true dyed-in-the-wool genius he is". He added that the "rugged and quite brilliantly performed" B-side, "Military Man", is "another of [Lynott's] typically angst-ridden ditties to misguided youth". Paul Sexton, writing for Record Mirror, said that Moore and Lynott had "put together a slick piece of pop metal". Jerry Smith of Music Week described it as "stormy HM" and a "commercial hard rock number that should give them a hit". He added: "Lynott's characteristic vocal and pumping bass forms a fine foil for Moore's more histrionic chorus and frenzied guitar figures."

Sandy Roberts of Sounds gave a mixed review, calling the song "well put together and pretty energetic" but one that "still feels like an album cut". Ro Newton, writing for Number One, considered the "underlying theme of racial equality" to be "admirable", but she felt the "heavy metal thrash and screeching guitar solos are none too appealing".

== Track listings ==
7" vinyl

Side one
No.	Title	Writer(s)	Length
1.	"Out in the Fields"	Gary Moore	4:18

Side two
No.	Title	Writer(s)	Length
1.	"Military Man"	Phil Lynott	5:38

7" vinyl double pack (limited edition)

- UK: 10 Records / TEN 49

Disc one, side one
No.	Title	Writer(s)	Length
1.	"Out in the Fields"	Moore	4:18

Disc one, side two
No.	Title	Writer(s)	Length
1.	"Military Man"	Lynott	5:38

Disc two, side one
No.	Title	Writer(s)	Length
1.	"Still in Love with You"	Lynott	5:51

Disc two, side two
No.	Title	Writer(s)	Length
1.	"Stop Messin' Around"	Clifford Adams, Peter Green	3:55

12" vinyl

Side one
No.	Title	Writer(s)	Length
1.	"Out in the Fields"	Moore	4:18
2.	"Military Man"	Lynott	5:38

Side two
No.	Title	Writer(s)	Length
1.	"Still in Love with You"	Lynott	5:51

== Personnel ==
Out in the Fields

- Gary Moore – guitars, lead vocals
- Phil Lynott – lead vocals, bass
- Andy Richards – keyboards
- Don Airey – keyboards
- Charlie Morgan – drums and electronic drums

== Chart performance ==
Chart (1985)	Peak position
Australia (Kent Music Report)	62
Irish Singles Chart	3
Dutch GfK chart	21
Dutch Top 40	28
Norwegian Singles Chart	2
Swedish Singles Chart	2
UK Singles Chart	5

== Cover versions ==
The song has been covered by multiple artists, including Riot (on The Brethren of the Long House, 1996), Dark at Dawn (on Crimson Frost, 2001), Michael Schenker Group (on Heavy Hitters, 2005), Supreme Majesty (on Elements of Creation, 2005), Primal Fear (on Metal Is Forever - The Very Best of Primal Fear, 2006), Sonata Arctica (as the B-side to "Paid in Full", 2007), Timo Kotipelto & Jani Liimatainen (on Blackoustic, 2012), Iron Mask (on V/A - Give Us Moore!: A Tribute to Gary Moore, 2004), Powerwolf (on Metallum Nostrum, bonus disc to Blessed & Possessed, 2015), Black Majesty (on Cross of Thorns, 2015) and Mono Inc. (on Together Till the End, 2017).
