= Mystic Circle =

German black metal band

- Origin: Ludwigshafen, Germany
- Genres: Melodic black metal; black metal; blackened death metal
- Years active: 1992–1993; 1994–2007; 2021–present
- Labels: Fireflash; Atomic Fire; Dockyard 1; Massacre; Last Episode
- Members: Graf von Beelzebub; Aaarrrgon
- Past members: Thorsten Schenke; Dirk Meisner; Agamidion; Mephisto; Baalsulgorr; Isternos; Ezpharess; Xeron; Maschtl Innerbichler; Raziel; Abyss; Blizzard; Necrodemon; Dementum; Vike Ragnar; Astaroth

Mystic Circle is a German black metal band formed in Ludwigshafen in 1992.

== History ==
Mystic Circle was formed in 1992 in Ludwigshafen. The band played death metal and recorded an unreleased rehearsal demo later that year. In 1993, the band split-up, but reformed in 1994 with a new line-up. They released several EPs before their debut LP was issued in December 1996. Following their 1998 release, they toured with Marduk and Old Man's Child, and played several large rock festivals. After their 1999 release Infernal Satanic Verses, original drummer Aarrrgon left the group, and they used a drum machine to complete the tour.

By 2007, Beelzebub had left the band to pursue a project called Gloomball. It was unknown whether Mystic Circle would replace Beelzebub or disband altogether, but Beelzebub stated on his personal Myspace page that Mystic Circle was "history".

In November 2021, Mystic Circle reformed and announced the release of their eponymous eighth studio album, their first in 16 years, which was released on February 4, 2022. In October 2022, the band announced their ninth album, Erzdämon, would be released in March 2023. In January 2023, the band released the single "The Scarecrow", and revealed that an album would be released on March 17.

On January 16, 2025, it was announced the band were working on their tenth album, Hexenbrand 1486, released on October 31.

== Band members ==
=== Current members ===
- Graf von Beelzebub – vocals, bass guitar (1992–1993, 1994–2007, 2021–present); guitars, keyboards (2021–present)
- Aaarrrgon – drums (1992–1993, 1994–1999, 2021–present); guitars, keyboards (2021–present)

=== Former members ===
- Thorsten Schenke – guitars (1992–1993)
- Dirk Meisner – guitars (1992–1993)
- Agamidion – guitars (1994–1997)
- Mephisto – guitars, keyboards (1994–1997)
- Baalsulgorr – keyboards (1997–2002)
- Isternos – guitars (1997–1999)
- Ezpharess – guitars, keyboards (1998–2007)
- Xeron – guitars (1999)
- Maschtl Innerbichler – drums (2000)
- Raziel – drums (2000–2001)
- Abyss – drums (2001)
- Blizzard – drums (2001)
- Necrodemon – drums (2001–2005)
- Dementum – drums (2005–2006)
- Vike Ragnar – guitars (2006–2007)
- Astaroth – drums (2006–2007)

== Discography ==
=== Studio albums ===
- Morgenröte – Der Schrei nach Finsternis (1996)
- Drachenblut (1998)
- Infernal Satanic Verses (1999)
- The Great Beast (2001)
- Damien (2002)
- Open the Gates of Hell (2003)
- The Bloody Path of God (2006)
- Mystic Circle (2022)
- Erzdämon (2023)
- Hexenbrand 1486 (2025)

=== EPs ===
- Kriegsgötter II (2000)

=== Demos ===
- Dark Passion (1994)
- Von Kriegern und Helden (1995)
- Die Götter der Urväter (1996)

=== Compilation albums ===
- Unholy Chronicles (1992–2004) (2004)
- Kriegsgötter MMXXV (2025)
