= Tribuzy =

- Origin: Brazil
- Genres: Heavy metal; power metal
- Years active: 2004–2007
- Label: Art Records
- Past members: Renato Tribuzy; Frank Schieber; Eduardo Fernandez; Flávio Pascarillo; Ivan Guilhon

Tribuzy is a Brazilian heavy metal band fronted by Renato Tribuzy. They have toured with Iron Maiden frontman Bruce Dickinson and guitarist/producer Roy Z. A live album called Execution – Live Reunion was released in May 2007.

== Members ==
- Renato Tribuzy – vocals
- Flavio Pascarillo – drums
- Ivan Guilhon – bass
- Eduardo Fernandez – guitar
- Frank Schieber – guitar

=== Former members ===
- Gustavo Silveira – guitar

=== Guest members ===
- Bruce Dickinson – vocals
- Ralf Scheepers – vocals
- Michael Kiske – vocals
- Mat Sinner – vocals
- Roy Z – guitar and production
- Roland Grapow – guitar
- Kiko Loureiro – guitar
- Chris Dale – bass
- Sidney Sohn – keyboards

== Discography ==
- Execution (2005)
- Execution – Live Reunion (2007, live)
