= Randy Black =

Canadian drummer (born 1963)

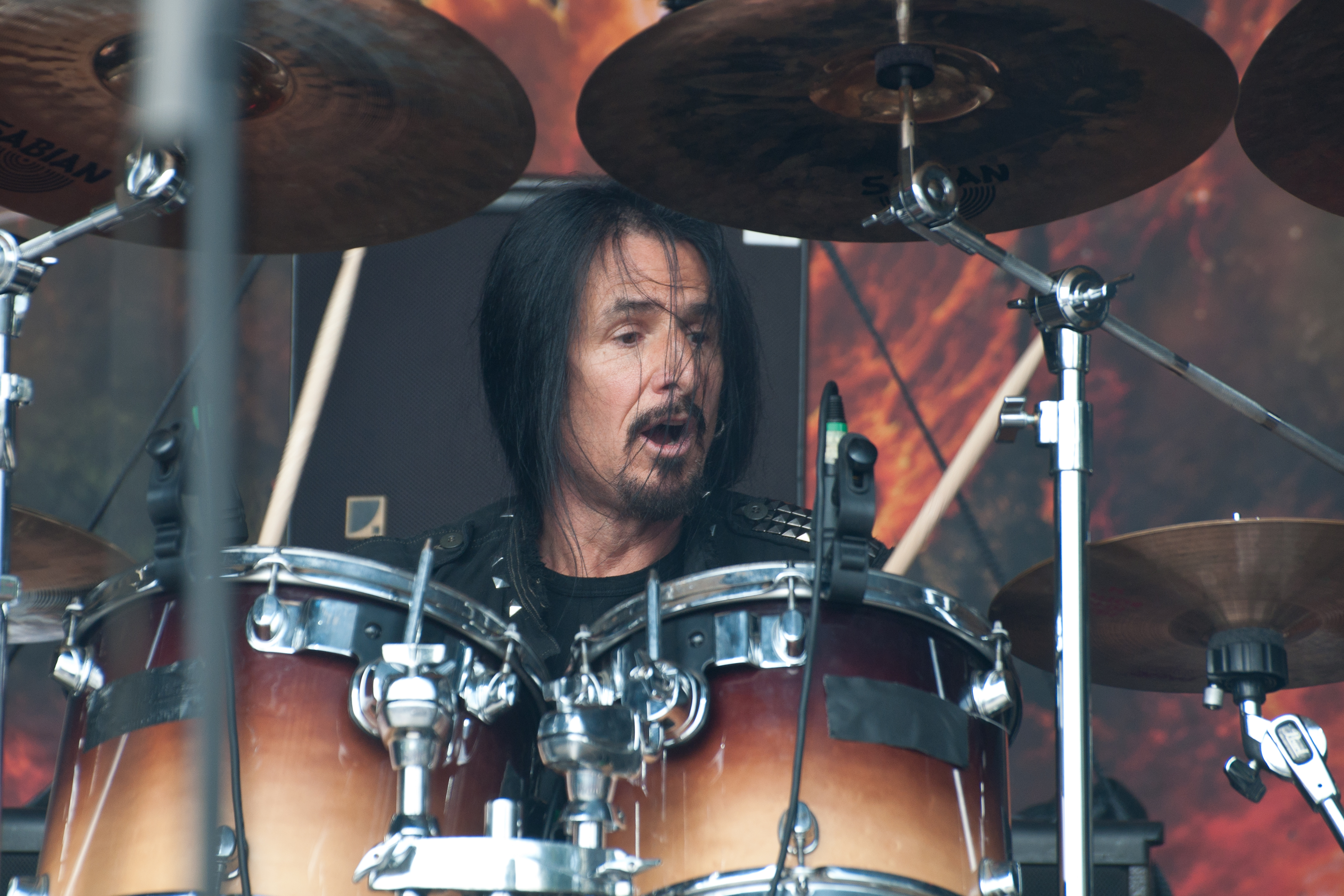
- Black performing in 2018

Background information
- Born: November 17, 1963 (age 62); Moose Jaw, Saskatchewan, Canada
- Genres: Hard rock; heavy metal; power metal; speed metal
- Occupations: Drummer
- Years active: 1980–present
- Member of: Destruction
- Formerly of: Primal Fear, Annihilator
- Website: randyblack.de

Randy Black (born November 17, 1963) is a Canadian drummer known best for his stints as the drummer for Bif Naked, Annihilator, Primal Fear, and Destruction. Although Black's actual acoustic drum configuration is not unique to the field of drumming, his playing style is notable for his ability to play ambidextrously with a symmetrical set of cymbals, specifically a dual set of remote hi-hats and ride cymbals to his right and to his left respectively.

== Biography ==
Black is a native of Moose Jaw, Saskatchewan. He got his first professional start in 1980 with a band called "The Edge". He did not start touring to any large degree until he joined the band "The Kaotics" in 1982. He then joined the band Click in 1984, who were known for their covers of material by bands such as Journey and Rush. The four members of Click stayed together and toured for nine years without a personnel change.

In 1993, Black moved to Vancouver and joined Annihilator. Black's bandmates were astonished at his technical precision and even dubbed him the "human drum machine".

In 1998, Black did some recording work with Bif Naked on the album I Bificus. It was shortly after this that Black moved to Germany. He also did some more recording with Annihilator. In 2003, Black joined the German heavy metal band Primal Fear, replacing original drummer Klaus Sperling.

In June 2011, Black announced that he would be officially endorsing Pearl Drums.

On August 11, 2014, Primal Fear announced that due to irreconcilable differences between lead singer Ralf Scheepers and him, Black departed the band after their performance at Summer Breeze Festival on August 15.

In late 2015, Black officially joined American heavy metal band W.A.S.P. as their touring drummer after the departure of their previous drummer Mike Dupke. In 2017, Black left W.A.S.P. Later in 2018, he joined German thrash metal band Destruction.

== Discography ==
=== Annihilator ===
- King of the Kill (1994)
- Refresh the Demon (1996)
- Waking the Fury (2002)
- Double Live Annihilation (2003)

=== Bif Naked ===
- I Bificus (1998)

=== Rebellion ===
- Shakespeare's Macbeth – A Tragedy in Steel (2002)
- Born a Rebel (2003)

=== Primal Fear ===
- Devil's Ground (2004)
- Seven Seals (2005)
- New Religion (2007)
- 16.6 (Before the Devil Knows You're Dead) (2009)
- Unbreakable (2012)
- Delivering the Black (2014)

=== Level 10 ===
- Chapter One (2015)

=== Destruction ===
- Born to Perish (2019)
- Diabolical (2022)
- Birth of Malice (2025)
