= Last Tribe =

Swedish heavy metal band

Background information
- Origin: Malmö, Sweden
- Genres: Power metal, progressive metal
- Years active: 2000–2003
- Labels: Frontiers
- Members: Magnus Karlsson; Rickard Bengtsson; Dick Lövgren; Jaime Salazar
- Past members: Lee Day; Pär Wallmark; Kristoffer "Doffe" Andersson

Last Tribe was a Swedish melodic power metal/progressive metal band founded by guitarist Magnus Karlsson. They were active from 2000 to 2003, releasing three studio albums.

== History ==
Karlsson was born south of Sweden in 1973. He started playing guitar at age 10 and quickly joined many bands. In 1996, he started an education at Malmö College of Music and was awarded a master's degree in music education in 2000. Karlsson joined the band Midnight Sun on the album Nemesis in 1999. He quickly received much attention due to his skills with a guitar and decided that it was time for him to start his own band. The result was Last Tribe with their first album The Ritual in 2001. The album was a success and so the band decided to write another album, only this time, without Kristoffer and Pär. The two new members were bassist Dick Lövgren and drummer Jaime Salazar, going on to write two more albums together, Witch Dance in 2002 and The Uncrowned in 2003.

== Members ==
=== Final lineup ===
- Magnus Karlsson – guitar, keyboards, backing vocals
- Rickard Bengtsson – vocals
- Dick Lövgren – bass
- Jaime Salazar – drums

=== Former members ===
- Lee Day – guitar
- Pär Wallmark – bass
- Kristoffer "Doffe" Andersson – drums

== Discography ==
- 2001: The Ritual (Frontiers/Avalon)
- 2002: Witch Dance (Frontiers/Avalon)
- 2003: The Uncrowned (Frontiers/Avalon)
