= Sinner (band) =

German heavy metal band

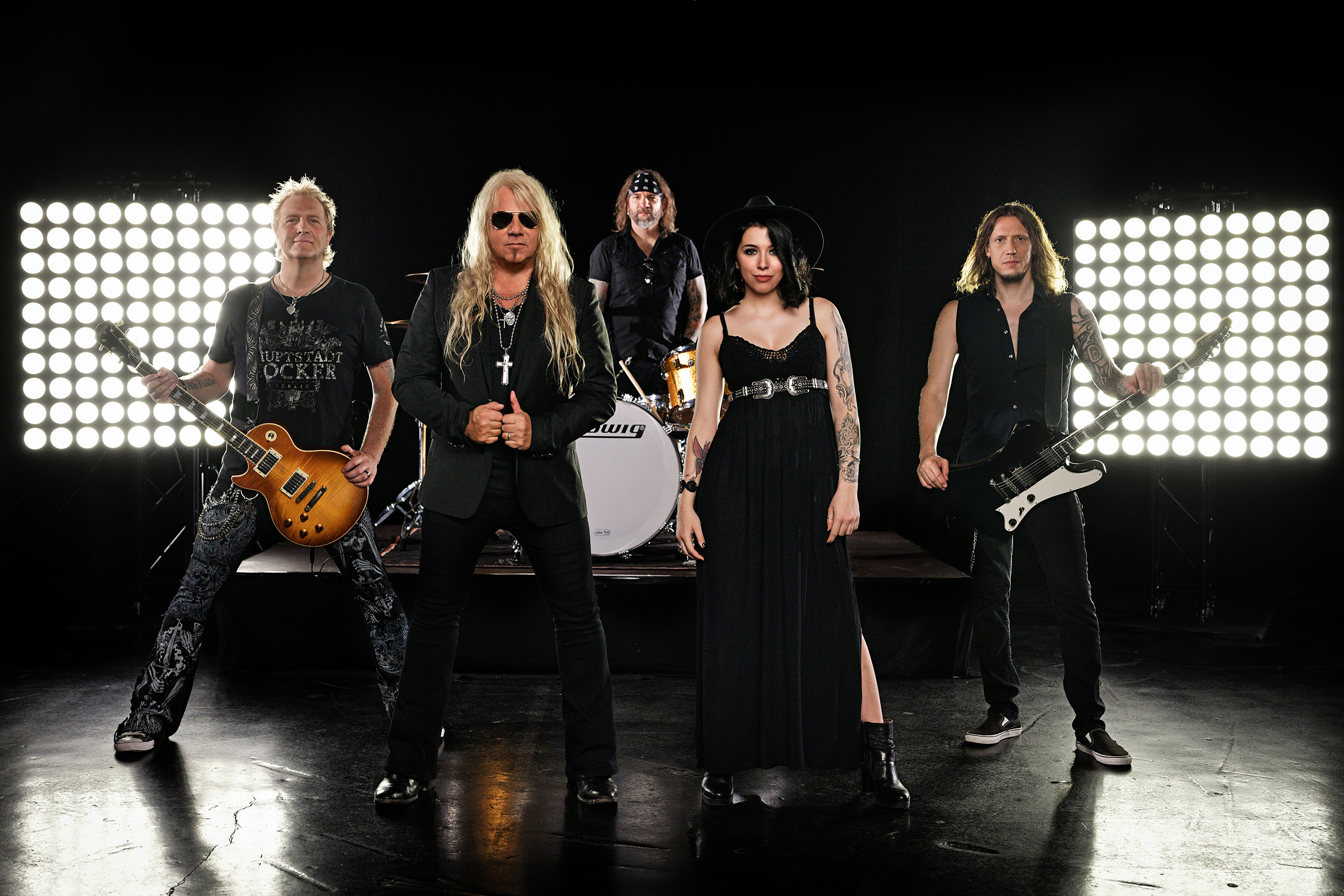
- Sinner 2019

Background information
- Origin: Stuttgart, West Germany
- Genres: Heavy metal, hard rock
- Years active: 1982–present
- Labels: AFM, No Bull, Nuclear Blast, Noise
- Members: Mat Sinner; Alex Scholpp; Tom Naumann; Markus Kullmann; Giorgia Colleluori
- Past members: See below
- Website: matsinner.com

Sinner is a German heavy metal band formed by vocalist and bassist Mat Sinner in 1982 (who later joined Primal Fear). They were part of the German heavy/speed/power metal scene. Their latest album, Boom Bang Goodbye, was released on 31 July 2026, and will be their last as Sinner will focus solely on Primal Fear going forward.

== History ==
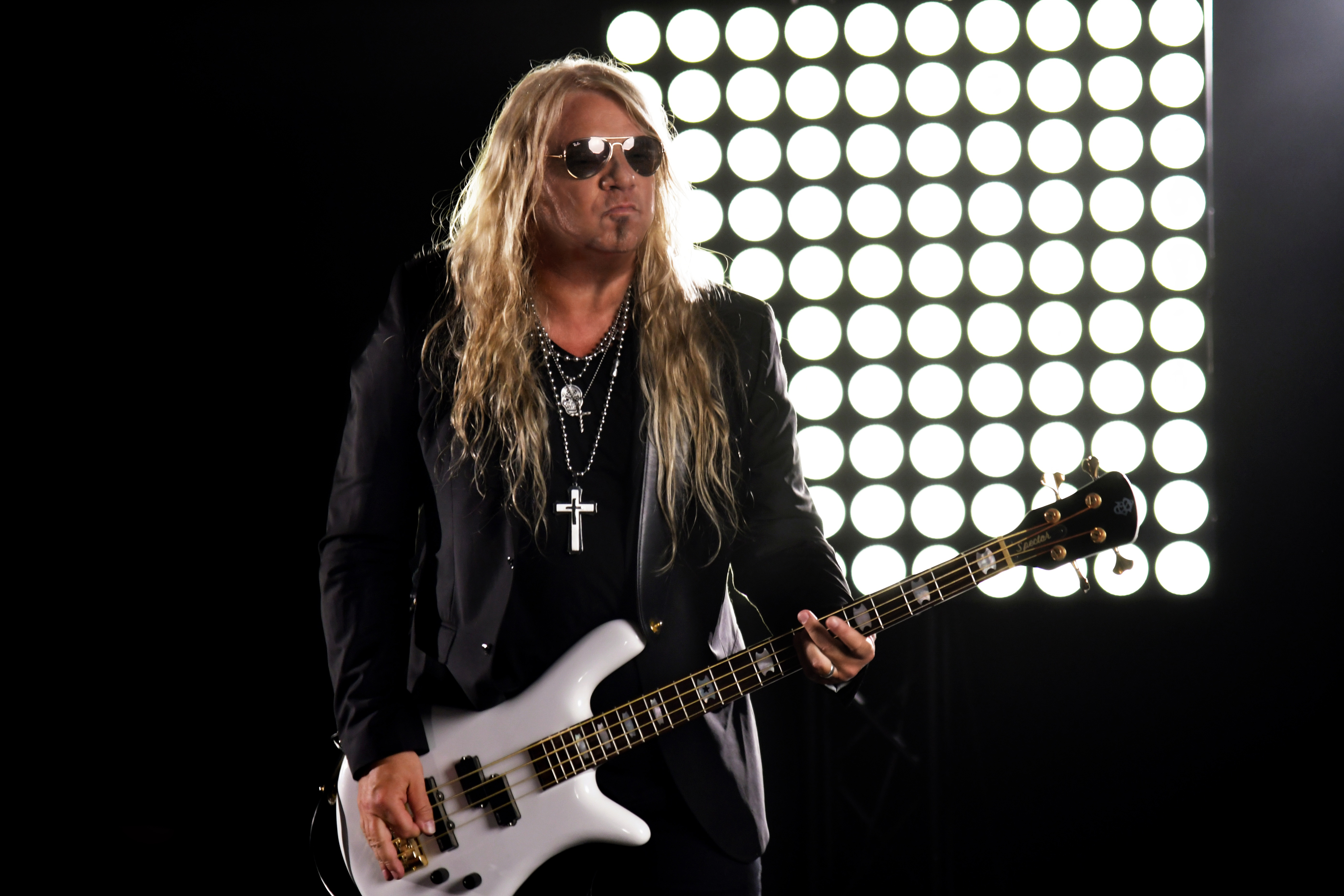
Mat Sinner in 2019

Based in Stuttgart, Sinner released their first album, Wild'n'Evil in 1982. This album, along with the next two (Fast Decision and Danger Zone) were raw affairs, having little in common with the melodic metal they would later become known for. After many personnel changes (including drummer Edgar Patrik leaving to join Bonfire), the band saw the addition of Accept's Herman Frank on guitars and the release of Touch of Sin in 1985. Frank would leave before the next album, 1986's Comin' Out Fighting, with future U.D.O. guitarist Mathias Dieth replacing him.

1987 saw the release of Dangerous Charm, a much more melodic album than previous efforts, but shortly after this the band lost their recording contract, took a break and would not be heard of again for five years.

In 1990, Mat Sinner released a solo album called Back to the Bullet on BMG with a completely new band. Three members of the Mat Sinner band reformed Sinner and released No More Alibis in 1992, an album far heavier than anything Sinner had released before. This renewed vigour coupled with songwriting that far exceeded the band's previous releases not only carried on but strengthened with Respect in 1994 and Bottom Line in 1995, the latter staying in the Japanese national chart for five weeks. Since the reformation the band's reputation had improved immensely, touring as support for bands such as Mr. Big and Savatage as well as headlining their own German tour and releasing a live album. Sinner were to reach even higher peaks though, releasing two hugely successful albums with Judgement Day in 1997 and The Nature of Evil in 1998 before touring Europe as support for rock giants Deep Purple. The Nature of Evil was the band's most successful album to date, reaching No. 63 in the German albums chart.

In 1998, Mat Sinner and Tom Naumann, who had been with Sinner since their reformation in 1992 formed Primal Fear with ex-Gamma Ray vocalist Ralf Scheepers. Mat Sinner has been involved as a driving force in both Sinner and Primal Fear to this day.

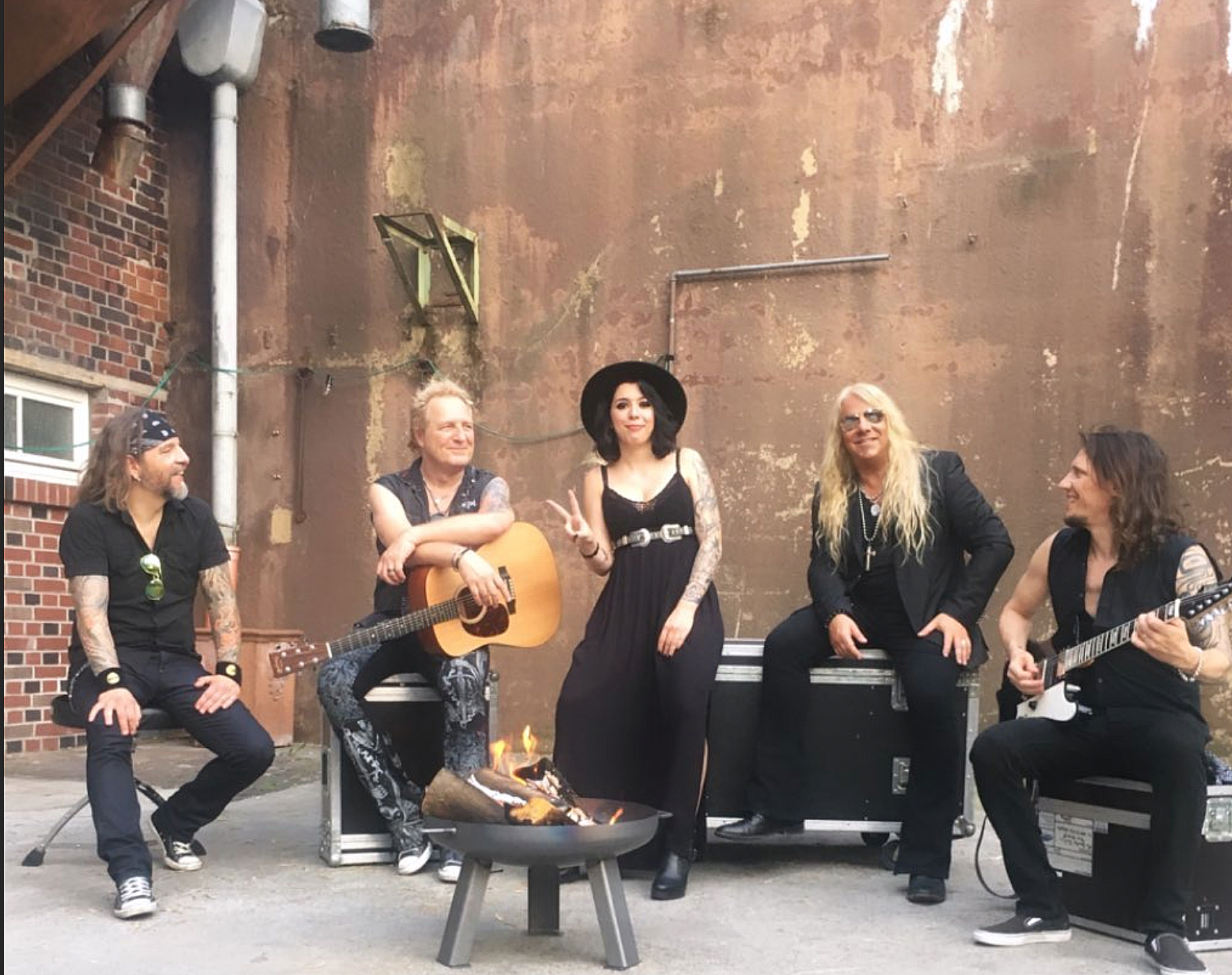
Sinner in 2019

In 2000, the band saw its first line-up change in five years as several members left, including guitarist Tom Naumann while ex-Helloween and Gamma Ray's Uli Kusch filled in on drums for The End of Sanctuary. However, in 2003 the previous 1995–1999 line-up renewed itself and on 20 January 2003 released There Will Be Execution before going quiet again for four years. In the past nine years the band had released six albums, proving to be the band's most successful period. This success would continue, as after releasing two more albums with Primal Fear, an album with his pre-Sinner band Goddess Shiva and guesting on Tribuzy's debut album, Mat Sinner brought Sinner back to release Mask of Sanity in 2007. This album spawned two popular singles in "Diary of Evil" and "Black" and included a faithful rendition of Thin Lizzy's "Baby Please Don't Go".

== Album sales ==
Sinner album sales have never been spectacular: it is estimated they sold less than 150,000 copies of their first three releases. The band's six and seven track albums of the 1990s, Respect and Bottom Line, sold less than 200,000 combined and without any real advertising except that of word of mouth. Sinner's fourth full-length album, Judgement Day, received fair reviews but again had little advertising put into it as the band spent most of its money on recording. Sinner's Nature of Evil released in 1998 proved to be the band's most successful original album with over 100,000 copies sold. Nature of Evil was advertised heavily on the internet mostly on German Music web sites.

In 1998 and 1999, Sinner released two compilation albums, the first was Emerald Collection containing many tracks from Danger Zone and Comin' Out Fighting. The second compilation album, which contained three songs from Bottom Line, three songs from Nature of Evil, four songs from Judgement Day, two from live recording and three new released songs, was called The Second Decade. The Second Decade became Sinner's best selling album, most of which were bought on eBay. The Second Decade by Sinner until 2005 was the only album available for sale on eBay and proved to be an international success. The Second Decade brought new fans to Europe primarily from Latin America, Japan, Denmark, Germany, Austria, Poland and Greece.

The End of Sanctuary and There Will Be Execution are currently Sinner's only 21st century albums that entered the German albums chart. After the German Top 50 album Tequila Suicide, Sinner toured Europe, Japan and Australia. The latest Sinner album Santa Muerte was released via AFM Records on 13 September 2019, including the first single/video "Fiesta Y Copas" featuring Ronnie Romero of Rainbow. Sinner has released seventeen albums and sold over a million records worldwide.

== Members ==
=== Current members ===
- Mat Sinner – bass, vocals (1980–present)
- Tom Naumann – guitars (1988–present)
- Alex Scholpp – guitars (2011–present)
- Markus Kullmann – drums (2018–present)
- Giorgia Colleluori – vocals (2018–present)

=== Former members ===
- Henny Wolter – guitars (2000–2006, 2007–2010)
- Klaus Sperling – drums (2006–2009)
- Frank Mittelbach – guitars (1981–1983)
- Calo Rapallo – guitars (1981–1982)
- Edgar Patrik – drums (1981–1983)
- Helmut Stoner – guitars (1983–1985)
- Mick Shirley – guitars (1982–1984)
- Ralf Schulz – drums (1984)
- Herman Frank – guitars (1985)
- Bernie van der Graaf – drums (1985–1990)
- Mathias Dieth – guitars (1986–1987)
- Angel Schleifer – guitars (1986)
- Andy Susemihl – guitars (1987, 1992)
- Armin Mücke – guitars (1987)
- Tommy Resch – drums (1991–1994)
- Frank Roessler – keyboards (1992–2007)
- Fritz Randow – drums (1995–1998, 2001–2005)
- Uli Kusch – drums (2000)
- Christof Leim – guitars (2006–2015)
- Alex Beyrodt – guitars (1990–2014)
- André Hilgers – drums (2010–2014)
- Moritz Müller – drums (2014–2016)
- Francesco Jovino – drums (2016–2019)

== Discography ==
=== Studio albums ===
- Wild 'n' Evil (1982)
- Fast Decision (1983)
- Danger Zone (1984)
- Touch of Sin (1985)
- Comin' Out Fighting (1986)
- Dangerous Charm (1987)
- No More Alibis (1992)
- Respect (1993)
- Bottom Line (1995)
- Judgement Day (1997)
- The Nature of Evil (1998)
- The End of Sanctuary (2000)
- There Will Be Execution (2003)
- Mask of Sanity (2007)
- Crash & Burn (2008)
- One Bullet Left (2011)
- Touch of Sin 2 (2013)
- Tequila Suicide (2017)
- Santa Muerte (2019)
- Brotherhood (2022)
- Boom Bang Goodbye (2026)

=== Singles ===
- "Out of Control" (1985)
- "Bad Girl" (1985)
- "Born to Rock" (1986)
- "Hypnotized" (1986)
- "Rebel Yell" (1987)
- "Tomorrow Doesn't Matter Tonight" (1987)
- "Knife in My Heart" (1988)
- "Where Were You" (1992)
- "Fire in the Dark" (1993)
- "Say Goodbye" (1995)
- "Judgement Day" (1997)
- "The Other Side" / "Black" (2007)

=== Live albums ===
- In the Line of Fire (Live in Europe) (1996)

=== Compilation albums ===
- The Best of Sinner - Noise Years (1995)
- Germany Rocks - The Best of Sinner (1995)
- Treasure - The Works 93-98 (1998)
- The Second Decade - Best of (Includes three new tracks) (1999)
- Emerald - Very Best of Sinner (1999)
- Jump the Gun - Collection (2009)
- No Place in Heaven the Very Best of the Noise Years 1984-1987 (2016)

=== Tribute albums ===
- A Tribute to Accept (covers "Balls to the Wall") (2000)
- The Spirit of the Black Rose - A Tribute to Phil Lynott (covers "The Sun Goes Down") (2001)
- Emerald - A Tribute to the Wild One (covers "The Sun Goes Down") (2002)
- A Tribute to the Four Horsemen (covers "Wherever I May Roam") (2002)

=== Mat Sinner solo ===
- Back to the Bullet (Mat Sinner) (1990)

=== Singles (solo band) ===
- "Every Second Counts" (1990)
- "Call My Name" (1990)
- "Back to the Bullet" (1990)
