= Jakob Samuel =

Swedish rock singer

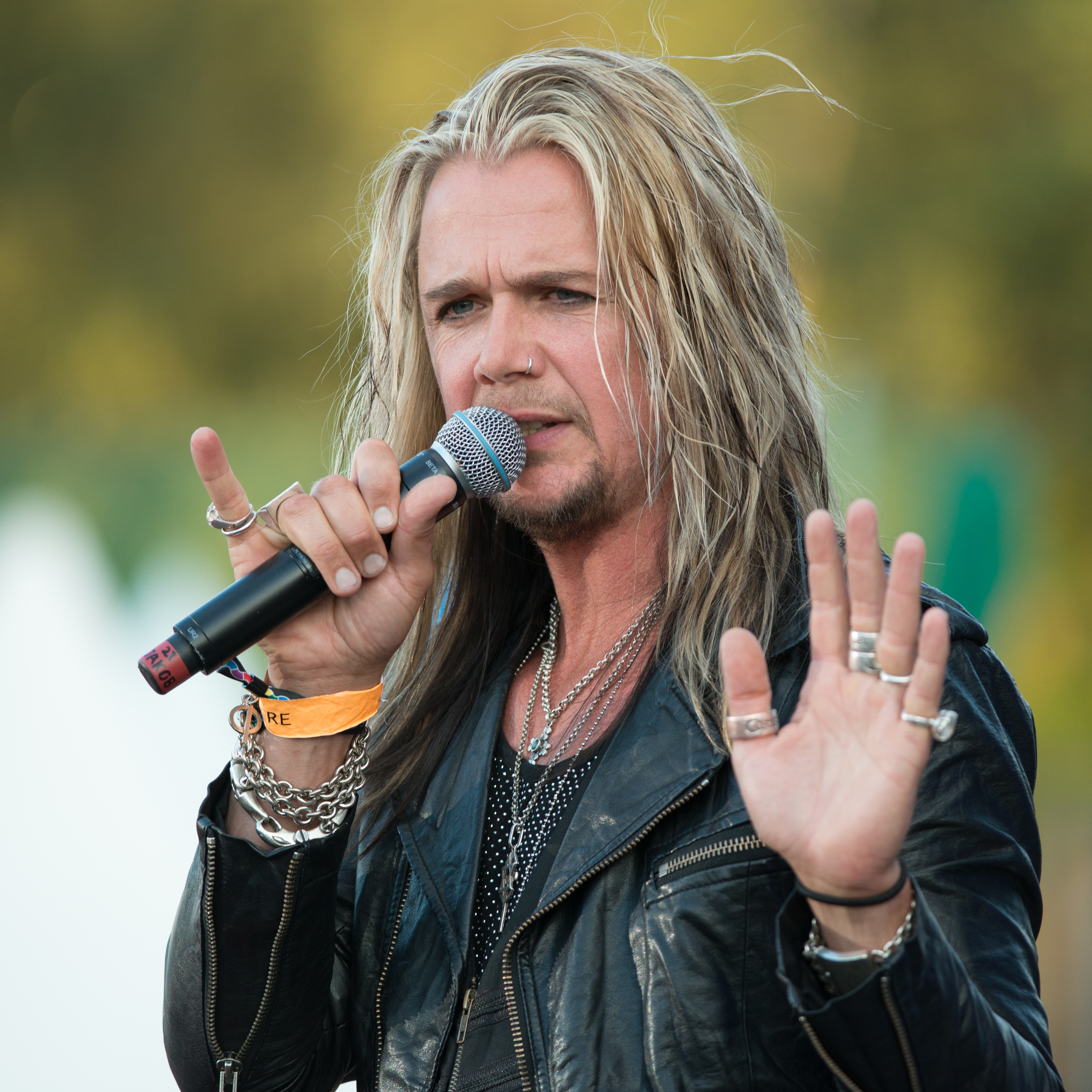
- Samuel at Stockholm Pride in 2014

Background information
- Birth name: Karl Erik Jakob Samuelsson
- Born: 19 February 1969 (age 56); Örebro, Sweden
- Genres: Hard rock
- Occupation: Singer
- Formerly of: The Poodles

Karl Erik Jakob Samuelsson (born 19 February 1969), known as Jakob Samuel, is a Swedish singer. He was the lead singer for the rock band The Poodles until they disbanded in 2018. In 2011, he competed in Körslaget which was broadcast on TV4, placing third.

His daughter Cornelia Jakobs is a singer and represented Sweden in the Eurovision Song Contest 2022.
