= Atomic Fire =

German independent record label, specialized in metal and related music styles

- Founded: 11 November 2021; 3 years ago
- Founder: Markus Staiger
- Defunct: January 2024; 1 year ago (absorbed into Reigning Phoenix Music)
- Status: Ceased operations
- Genre: Heavy metal; extreme metal; power metal
- Country of origin: Germany
- Location: Donzdorf, Germany
- Official website: www.atomicfire-records.com

Atomic Fire was a record label and mail order record distributor based in Germany. It was founded by Markus Staiger in 2021.

== History ==
In 2021, Nuclear Blast founder Markus Staiger launched a new record company called Atomic Fire GmbH. Several bands previously with Nuclear Blast had already signed on by the time of the public announcement, including Helloween, Opeth, Meshuggah, Amorphis, and Sonata Arctica.

On 21 November 2022, the Finnish hard rock/heavy metal band Lordi announced their signing to Atomic Fire Records.

On 27 January 2024, Reigning Phoenix Music (RPM) announced that Atomic Fire and its roster would be integrated into their label.

== See also ==
- List of record labels
