= At Vance =

German metal band

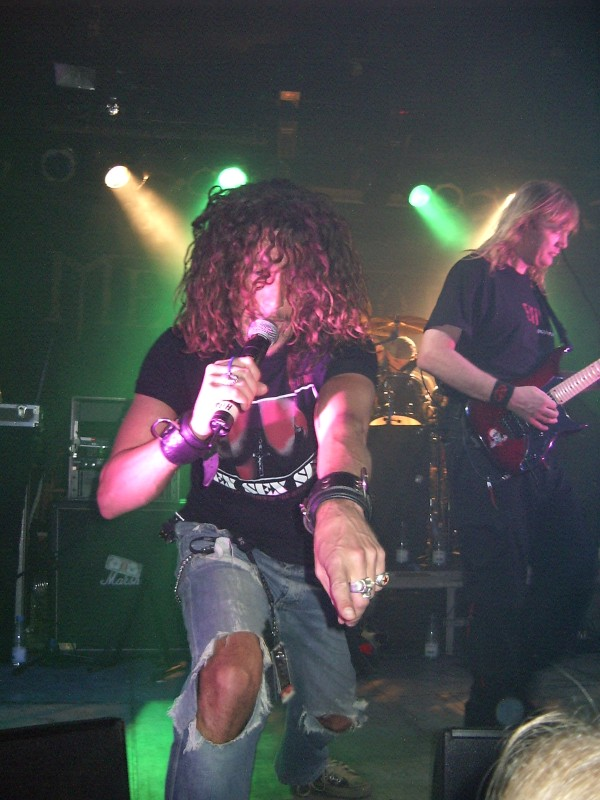
- Mats Levén, Olaf Lenk, and John ABC Smith

Background information
- Origin: Germany
- Genres: Power metal, neoclassical metal
- Years active: 1998–present
- Labels: Shark, AFM
- Members: Olaf Lenk; Rick Altzi; Chris Hill; Kevin Kott
- Website: at-vance.olaflenk.com

At Vance is a neoclassical/power metal band formed in Germany. They were formed by vocalist Oliver Hartmann (ex-Centers) and guitarist Olaf Lenk (ex-Velvet Viper) in 1998.

== Biography ==
At Vance started easily. With the combined credentials of vocalist Oliver Hartmann and guitarist Olaf Lenk, At Vance easily obtained a deal with Shark Records. Rainald König (guitar), Uli Müller (keyboards), Jochen Schnur (bass), and Spoony (drums) rounded out the lineup that recorded 1999's debut No Escape. The album proved successful across Europe, and the group's second release, 2000's Heart of Steel (featuring a new drummer Jürgen Lucas) was a surprise hit in Japan and encouraged At Vance to quickly issue a follow-up in 2001's Dragonchaser. The next year saw the band switching to AFM Records, losing their bassist and keyboard player, releasing their fourth album Only Human, and then hitting the road across Europe with Rhapsody and Angel Dust. A number of personnel changes ensued in 2003, as At Vance welcomed a new vocalist Mats Levén and bassist Sascha Feldmann, while no keyboard player was invited with Lenk taking control over the keyboards, as well, before recording their next LP The Evil in You. A tour with Kamelot followed the release.

Later, Lenk fired König and Feldmann, replacing the latter with bassist John ABC Smith (born Dario Trobok) (ex-Scanner, ex-Gallows Pole), while Mark Cross (ex-Helloween) replaced Jürgen Lucas on drums. Main guitar work was then performed by Lenk supported by vocalist Mats Levén on rhythm-guitar. This four-piece formation released a new record, Chained, which transpired to be the second and the last album with Mats Levén on lead vocals. The band then crystallized as a four-piece outfit with Olaf Lenk being the only guitarist.

In April 2007, At Vance's MySpace webpage announced a new record would be released in May 2007 titled VII, introducing a young singer Rick Altzi (ex-Treasure Land) on vocals. This album, recorded for the first and only time by a duo, Lenk and Altzi, was mastered at Finnvox by Mika Jussila. This album is also the first one to diverge from the previous At Vance's albums by containing no transcriptions of classical pieces, while the previous ones cited, among other, the first movement of Ludwig van Beethoven's "Fifth Symphony", as well as "Spring", "Summer", and "Winter" from Antonio Vivaldi's "The Four Seasons".

A new line-up assembled in-between the At Vance's seventh and eighth full-length albums was announced through the band's webpage, adding Alex Landenburg (from Annihilator) on drums and Manuel Walther on bass.

In May 2009, the band announced via their MySpace page that bassist Manuel Walther had left At Vance, and would be replaced by Wolfman Black of the German band Justice, while no drummer would be added leaving the band a three-piece outfit of Lenk, Altzi, and Black.

In July 2009, AFM Records announced that the trio's eighth album, entitled Ride The Sky, would be released on 18 September, and so occurred that day.

In April 2012, the band released their final (ninth) studio album, Facing Your Enemy, via AFM Records.

In 8 of May of 2023 At Vance's Facebook page reported "...working on new stuff".

== Band members ==
Current members

- Rick Altzi – vocals
- Olaf Lenk – guitars, keyboards
- Chris Hill – bass
- Kevin Kott – drums

Former members

- Mats Levén – vocals, guitars
- Oliver Hartmann – vocals, guitars
- Rainald König – guitars (1999-2004), bass guitar (session in 1998)
- Uli Müller – keyboards
- Jochen Schnur – bass
- Sascha Feldmann – bass
- Jürgen Lucas – drums
- John ABC Smith (born Dario Trobok) – bass
- Mark Cross (Spoony) – drums
- Manuel Walther – bass
- Wolfman Black – bass
- Alex Landenburg – drums

Timeline

== Discography ==
Studio albums

- No Escape (1999)
- Heart of Steel (2000)
- Dragonchaser (2001)
- Only Human (2002)
- The Evil in You (2003)
- Chained (2005)
- VII (2007)
- Ride the Sky (2009)
- Facing Your Enemy (2012)

Compilations

- Early Works / Centers (2001)
- The Best Of (2004)
- Decade (2010)
