= Primal Fear (band) =

German power metal band

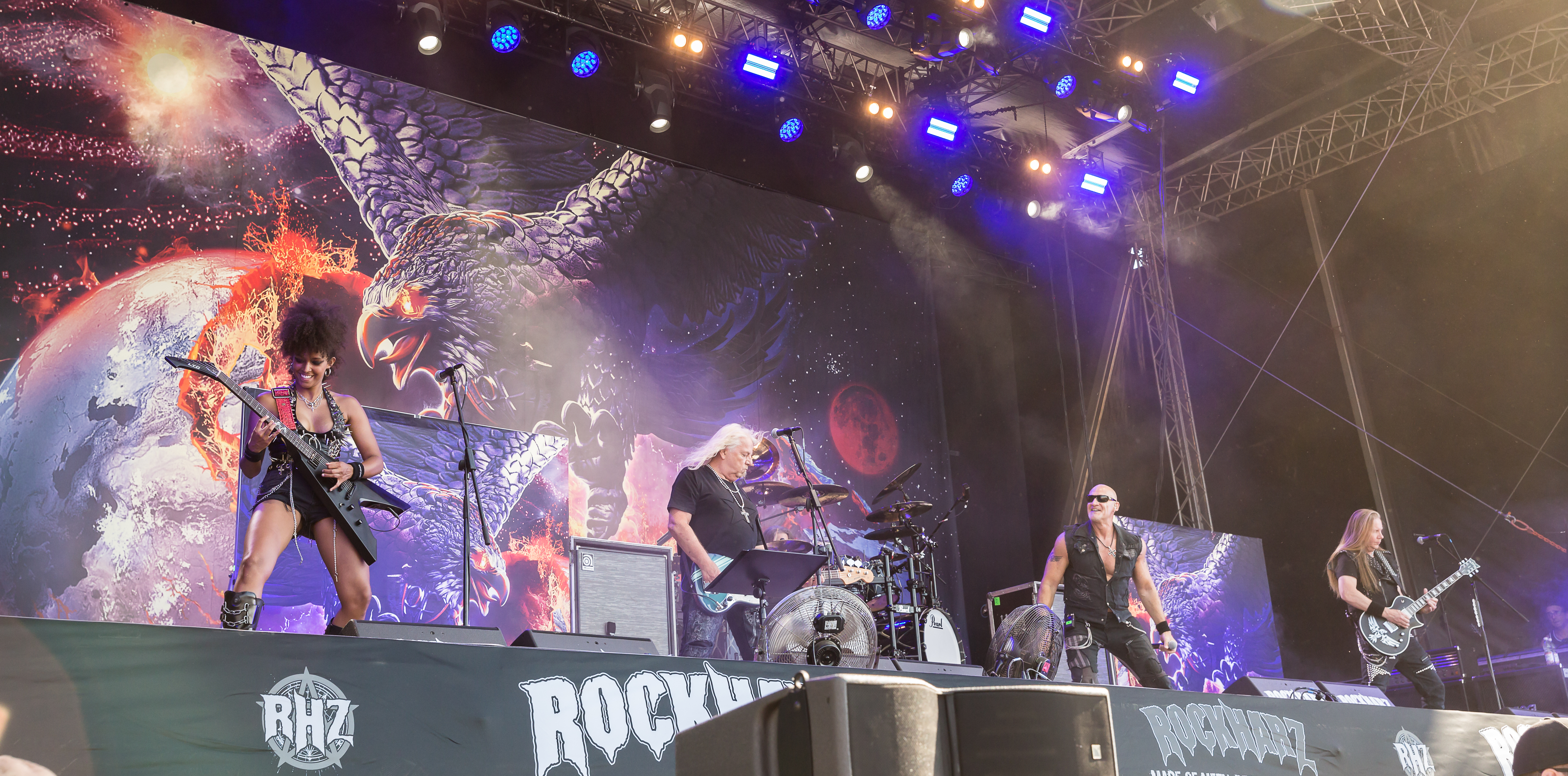
- Primal Fear performing in 2025

Background information
- Origin: Esslingen, Germany
- Genres: Power metal; heavy metal
- Years active: 1997–present
- Labels: Frontiers; Nuclear Blast
- Members: Ralf Scheepers; Mat Sinner; Magnus Karlsson; Thalìa Bellazecca; André Hilgers
- Past members: Klaus Sperling; Tom Naumann; Stefan Leibing; Henny Wolter; Randy Black; Alex Beyrodt; Francesco Jovino; Michael Ehré
- Website: primalfear.de

Primal Fear is a German power metal band formed in 1997 by Ralf Scheepers (vocals, ex-Gamma Ray) and Mat Sinner (bass and vocals, Sinner). Sinner and Scheepers formed the band after Scheepers was not hired as Rob Halford's replacement in Judas Priest.

== History ==
Primal Fear was founded in October 1997 by singer Ralf Scheepers and Mat Sinner. Scheepers and Sinner have been constants in the heavy metal scene before the band was founded. Ralf Scheepers sang in the bands Tyran Pace, F.B.I. and the internationally successful band Gamma Ray. After a gig with his Judas Priest cover band Just Priest in which Mat Sinner and Tom Naumann helped out the idea arose to found Primal Fear. They signed a record deal with Nuclear Blast Records in late 1997. Their debut album Primal Fear was released in February 1998 and entered the German LP charts at place 48 thus making it one of the highest chart entries of a debut album in German metal. The same year they toured with metal veterans Running Wild and HammerFall.

In July 1999, the 2nd album Jaws of Death was released. Shortly after its release guitarist Tom Naumann left the band due to health problems. During the tour through Europe, Brazil and Japan he was replaced by Alex Beyrodt. In January 2000, Henny Wolter joined the band as a permanent replacement. In early 2001, the third album Nuclear Fire was released. At the following world tour the band played in the US for the first time and were guests at the Metal Meltdown Festival and the Milwaukee Metalfest.

The next album Black Sun was released on 29 April 2002 and entered the German LP charts at place 55, being ranked by Loudwire as the 19th best power metal album of all time. Halford-Guitarist Mike Chlasciak contributed the guitar solos for the songs "Fear" and "Armageddon". The highlight of the following double-headliner tour with fellow band Rage was a gig at the Scala in London. The same year Henny Wolter left the band and was replaced by the returning Tom Naumann. With this line-up the band again toured through Brazil and ended the Black Sun tour. In April–May 2003, the band participated in the "Metal Gods" tour together with Rob Halford, Testament and a few other bands and toured through the US and Canada. During the Tour drummer Klaus Sperling was replaced by Randy Black. After the tour, Randy joined the band permanently.

In February 2004, the 5th album Devil's Ground was released and entered the German LP charts at place 67. April of the same year the band started another world tour in which the band toured through Europe, Japan, the US and South America including one of the band's biggest hits "Metal Is Forever". Directly after the tour the band recorded their 6th album Seven Seals in Vancouver and Stuttgart. It was released in Fall of 2005 mixed by Mike Frazer in Vancouver. To promote the album the band went on Europe and Japan tour together with fellow Power Metal band Helloween.

In July 2006, the band surprisingly left Nuclear Blast Records and signed a long-term contract with Frontiers Records. As a "parting gift" Nuclear Blast released the best of compilation Metal is Forever. They performed at Wacken Open Air the following month.

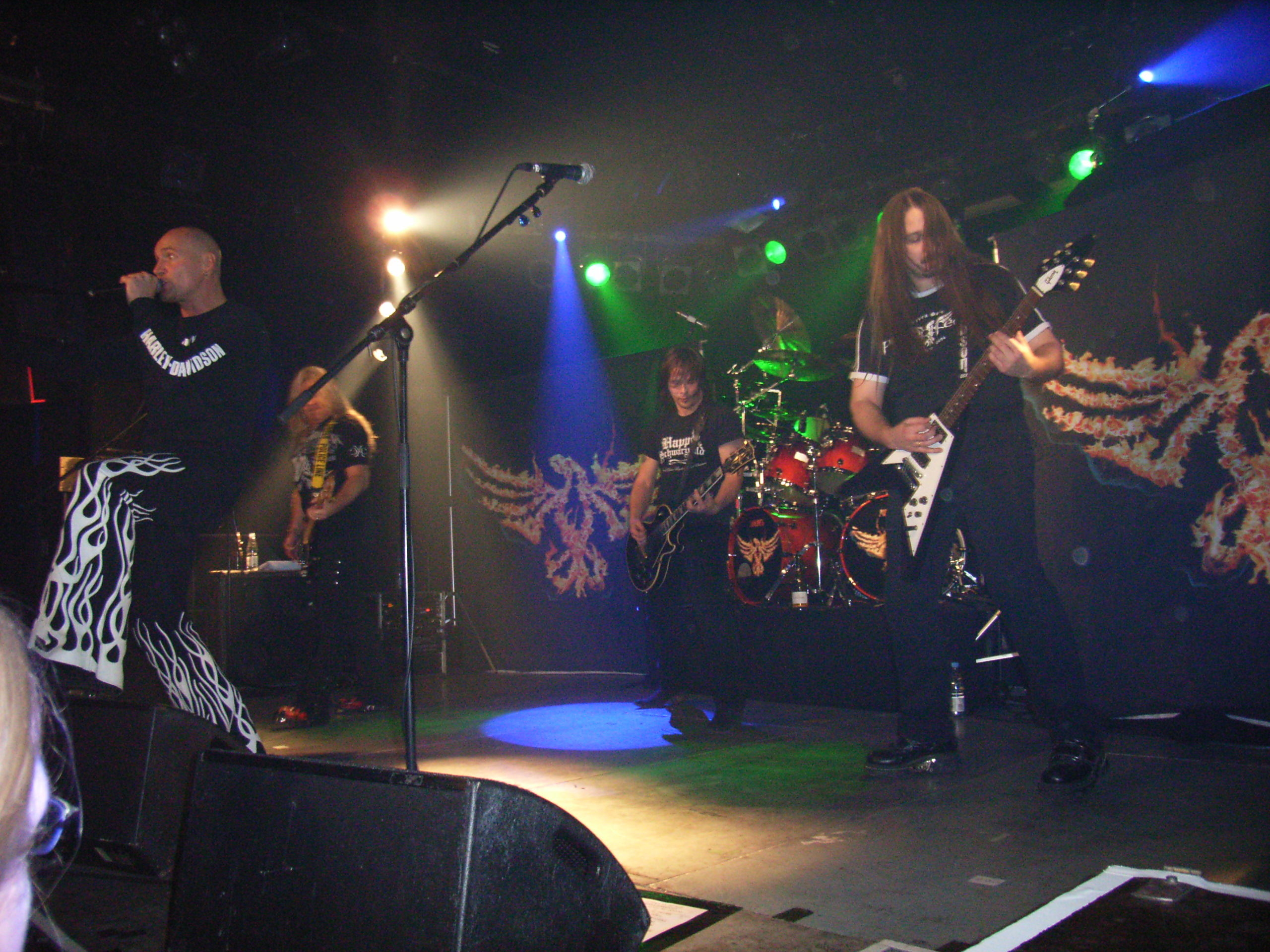
Primal Fear in 2007

In February 2007, during the recordings for the next album New Religion the band decided after long discussions about the future of the band that Henny Wolter would return as 2nd guitarist and Tom Naumann would leave the band. The album was finished under the direction of producer Mat Sinner and engineer and co-producer Charlie Bauerfeind and was mixed by Roland Prent in the Galaxy Studios in Belgium. It was released in September 2007 and entered the German LP charts at place 60. They started their New Religion tour as co-headliner of the sold out ProgPower USA (PPUSA) VIII festival in Atlanta, US. Afterwards they toured together with U.D.O. through Europe. They continued the tour in January 2008 due to the band's 10th birthday and once again toured through Europe.

Early March 2008, the band announced that longtime guitarist Stefan Leibing had left the band because he wanted to spend more time with his family and his business. On future releases and tours he would be replaced by Swedish guitarist Magnus Karlsson, who already contributed 2 guitar solos for the New Religion album. In December 2008 the band entered the House of Music Studios to record their next album 16.6. They said that "the music includes a lot of the vibe of our very first albums" and that "a new Primal Fear album always contained some new musical challenges, real surprises". The Album was released on 22 May in Europe and 9 June in the US. The Video for the song Six Time Dead (16.6) has premiered on 8 May on the band's official MySpace channel. The Album reached No.46 on the German, No.52 in Swedish and No.28 in the Japanese album charts. The band started their longest tour ever in South America, North America, Canada, Europe and Japan to promote their new album. A new live CD and DVD was recorded during every leg on the tour. In 2010 the band spent their longest time on the road in North America tour, followed by another European Tour in September–November 2010.

On 8 July 2011, the band announced their next album Unbreakable. The album was released on 20 January 2012. The band toured extensively throughout 2012 in support of the album on the "Metal Nation" tour, of which the European leg included dates in Italy, Germany, Brazil, Chile, Argentina and Bolivia among others. The band also played several more shows in 2013.

On 20 May 2013, it was announced on the band's official website that they would begin recording their next album the following day. On 4 October, Primal Fear announced their new album Delivering the Black. It was released on 24 January 2014 by Frontiers Records.

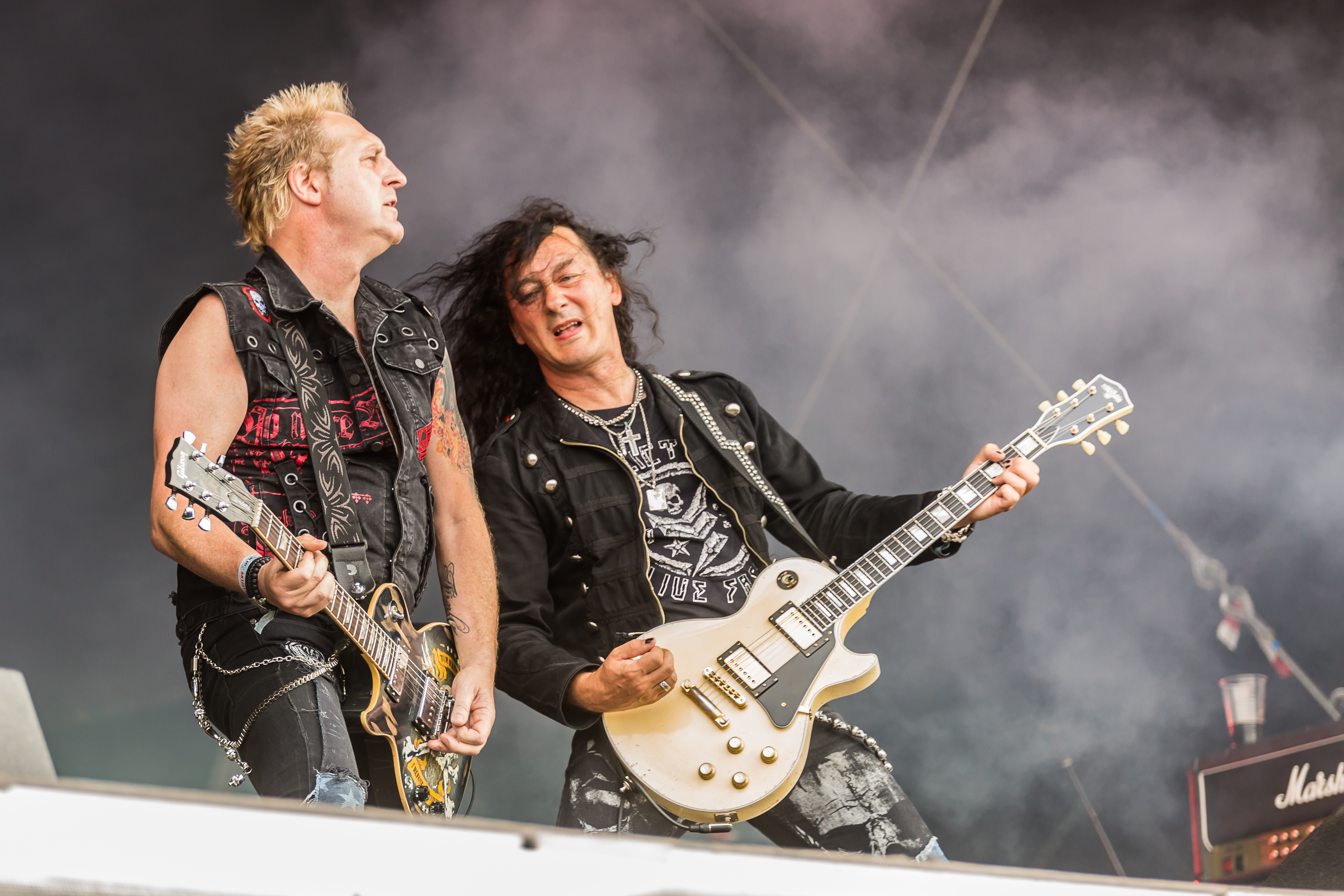
Primal Fear at Rockharz Open Air 2018

On 11 August 2014, drummer Randy Black parted ways with the band due to "irreconcilable differences" between him and Ralf Scheepers. His last appearance was at the Summer Breeze festival in Germany. His departure became effective on 16 August. On 13 June 2015, the band announced that former U.D.O. drummer Francesco Jovino would replace him along with returning guitarist Tom Naumann.

On 22 January 2016, the band released their eleventh studio album Rulebreaker.

In November 2017, Primal Fear entered the studio to begin work on their twelfth album Apocalypse, which was released 10 August 2018.

On 3 April 2020, Primal Fear announced the title of their thirteenth studio album Metal Commando, along with a release date of 17 July 2020. A single titled "Along Came the Devil", in support of the upcoming album was released on 15 May 2020. On 9 April 2021, Primal Fear released an EP titled I Will Be Gone, featuring Tarja Turunen.

On 23 August 2024, it was announced that the band parted ways with guitarist Alex Beyrodt. Tom Naumann and drummer Michael Ehré left the band after the decision to continue without Beyrodt. Five days later, the band announced Thalìa Bellazecca as their new guitarist. On 31 August, the band announced André Hilgers as their new drummer.

On 5 September 2025, the band released their fifteenth album Domination via Reigning Phoenix Music. It will be followed by their upcoming sixteenth album Shadowriders, scheduled for release on 23 April 2027.

== Band members ==
=== Current ===
- Ralf Scheepers – lead vocals (1997–present)
- Mat Sinner – bass, co-lead vocals (1997–present)
- Magnus Karlsson – guitars (2008–present)
- Thalìa Bellazecca – guitars (2024–present)
- André Hilgers – drums (2024–present)

=== Live ===
- Constantine – guitars (2012–2013)
- Aquiles Priester – drums (2014–2015)
- Alex Jansen – bass (2022–2024)

=== Former ===
- Klaus Sperling – drums (1997–2003)
- Tom Naumann – guitars (1997–2000, 2003–2007, 2015–2024; live 2013–2015)
- Stefan Leibing – guitars (1998–2008)
- Henny Wolter – guitars (2000–2003, 2007–2010)
- Randy Black – drums (2003–2014)
- Alex Beyrodt – guitars (live 2011–2024)
- Francesco Jovino – drums (2015–2019)
- Michael Ehré – drums (2019–2024)

== Discography ==
Studio albums

Year	Title	Label
1998	Primal Fear	Nuclear Blast
1999	Jaws of Death	Nuclear Blast
2001	Nuclear Fire	Nuclear Blast
2002	Black Sun	Nuclear Blast
2004	Devil's Ground	Nuclear Blast
2005	Seven Seals	Nuclear Blast
2007	New Religion	Frontiers Records
2009	16.6 (Before the Devil Knows You're Dead)	Frontiers Records
2012	Unbreakable	Frontiers Records
2014	Delivering the Black	Frontiers Records
2016	Rulebreaker	Frontiers Records
2018	Apocalypse	Frontiers Records
2020	Metal Commando	Nuclear Blast
2023	Code Red	Atomic Fire
2025	Domination	Reigning Phoenix Music
2027	Shadowriders	Reigning Phoenix Music

Live albums

Year	Title
2010	Live in the USA
2017	Angels of Mercy – Live in Germany

Compilation albums

Year	Title
2006	Metal Is Forever – The Very Best of Primal Fear
2017	Best of Fear

EPs

Year	Title
2021	I Will Be Gone
