= Mat Sinner =

German musician

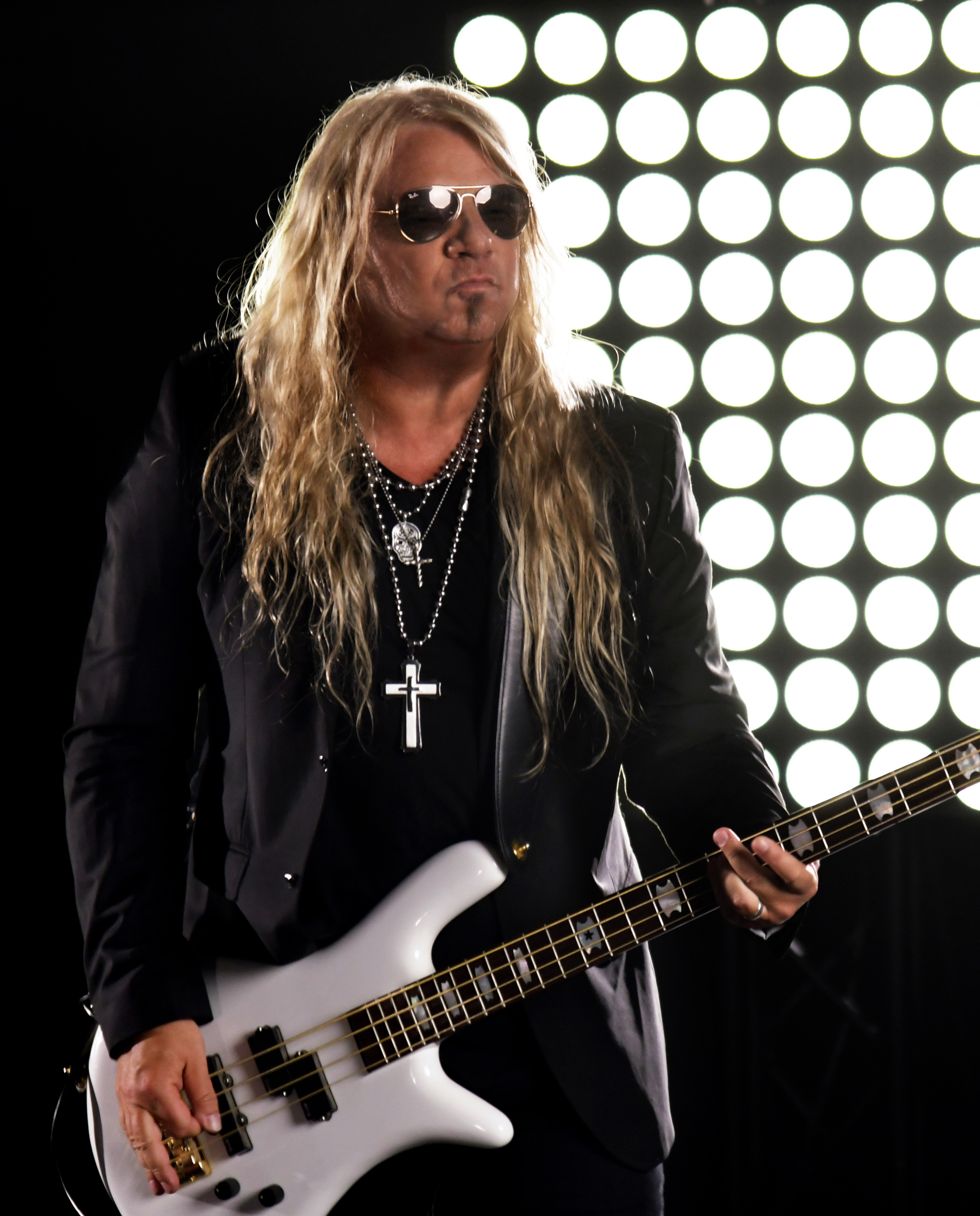
- Sinner in 2019

Background information
- Birth name: Matthias Lasch
- Genres: Melodic rock, heavy metal, power metal
- Occupation(s): Musician, singer, producer, songwriter
- Instrument(s): Bass guitar, vocals
- Years active: 1982–present
- Website: matsinner.com

Matthias Lasch (born 16 October 1964), known professionally as Mat Sinner, is a German bassist, singer and record producer from Stuttgart.

Sinner has been involved in numerous bands and projects throughout his musical career. His main bands have been Sinner since 1982 and Primal Fear since 1997; he formed the latter band with former Gamma Ray singer Ralf Scheepers. He also formed the band Voodoo Circle with guitarist Alex Beyrodt, in 2008.

Sinner has also been working as a record producer for Kiske/Somerville, Bobby Kimball/Jimi Jamison (former vocalists of bands Toto and Survivor), and the first Scheepers solo album. Sinner is also the musical director of the successful Rock Meets Classic tour in Europe, where legendary rock singers team up with the RMC Symphony Orchestra and the Mat Sinner Band every year with a setlist of classic rock songs.

In 2013, Sinner also joined the band Silent Force.

In 2014, it was announced that a new project called Level 10, featuring Sinner with Symphony X vocalist Russell Allen and other members of Primal Fear. In January 2015 Chapter One was released.

In 2017, Mat Sinner released the album Tequila Suicide with his band Sinner with a Top 50 chart entry in Germany. The Primal Fear album Apocalypse released in August 2018 and charted Top 10 in Germany and 11 more countries. The Sinner album Santa Muerte released on 13 September 2019 and the Primal Fear album Metal Commando was released on 24 July 2020.

== Discography ==
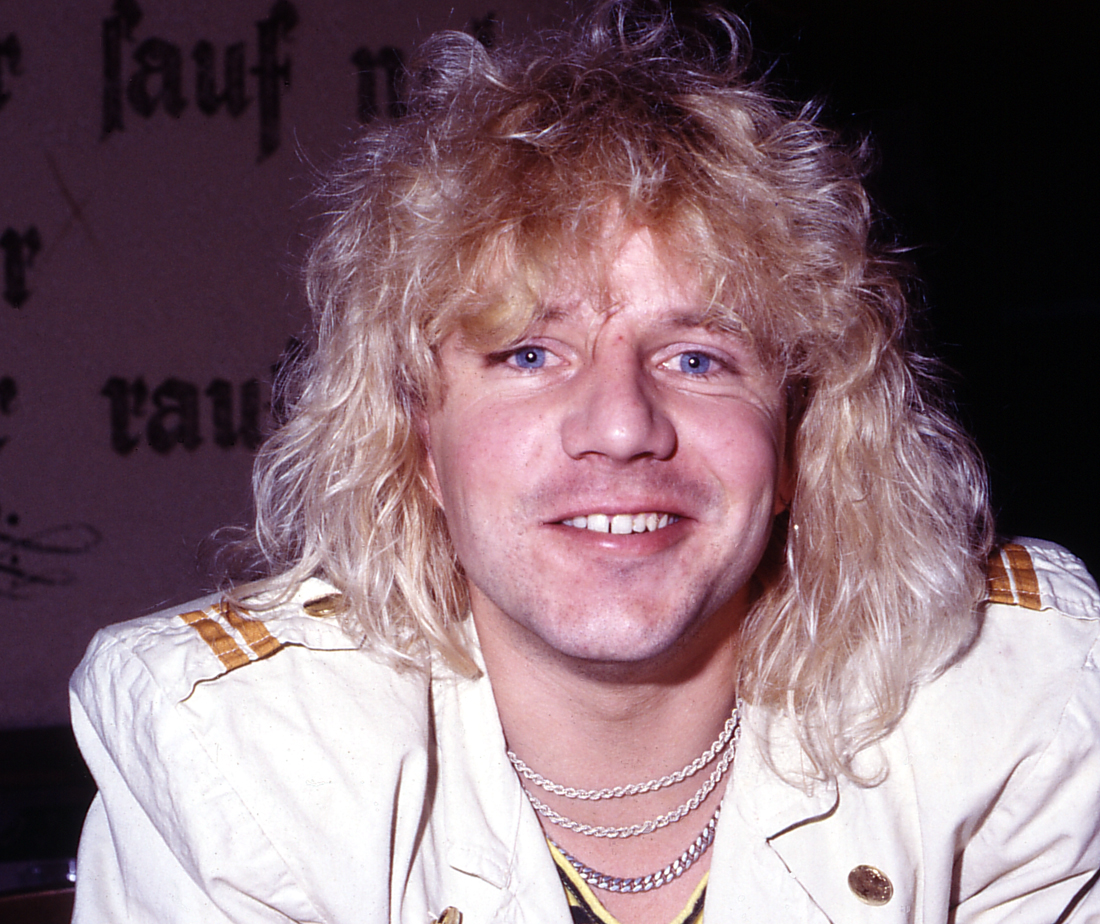
Mat Sinner in 1987

=== Solo ===
- Back to the Bullet (1990)

=== Kiske/Somerville ===
- Kiske/Somerville (2010)
- City of Heroes (2015)

=== Voodoo Circle ===
- Voodoo Circle (2008)
- Broken Heart Syndrome (2011)
- More Than One Way Home (2013)
- Whisky Fingers (2015)
- Raised on Rock (2018)
- Locked & Loaded (2021)

=== Ralf Scheepers ===
- Scheepers (2011)

=== Silent Force ===
- Rising From Ashes (2013)

=== Level 10 ===
- Chapter One (2015)

=== Other ===
- The Heat – Same (1993)
- Skin Deep – Painful Day (1993)
- The Heat – Goldfinger (1995)
- Pegazus – Breaking The Chains (1999)
- Kovenant – New World Order (2000)
- Hammerfall – "Crimson Thunder" (2002)
- Rick Renstrom – Rick Renstrom (2004)
- Joacim Cans – Beyond the Gates (2004)
- Dionysus – Fairytales & Reality (2006)
- Tribuzy – Execution (2006)
- Vengeance – Back in the Ring (2006)
- Biss – Xtension (2006)
- Goddess Shiva – Goddess Shiva (2007)
- Tribuzy – Execution – Live Reunion (2007)
- Barra Bazz – Barra Bazz (2008)
- Vengeance – Soul Collector (2009)
- Phenomena – Blind Faith (2010)
- Kimball/Jamison – Kimball Jamison (2011)
- Jorn – Life On Death Road (2017)
