= Ralf Scheepers =

German singer

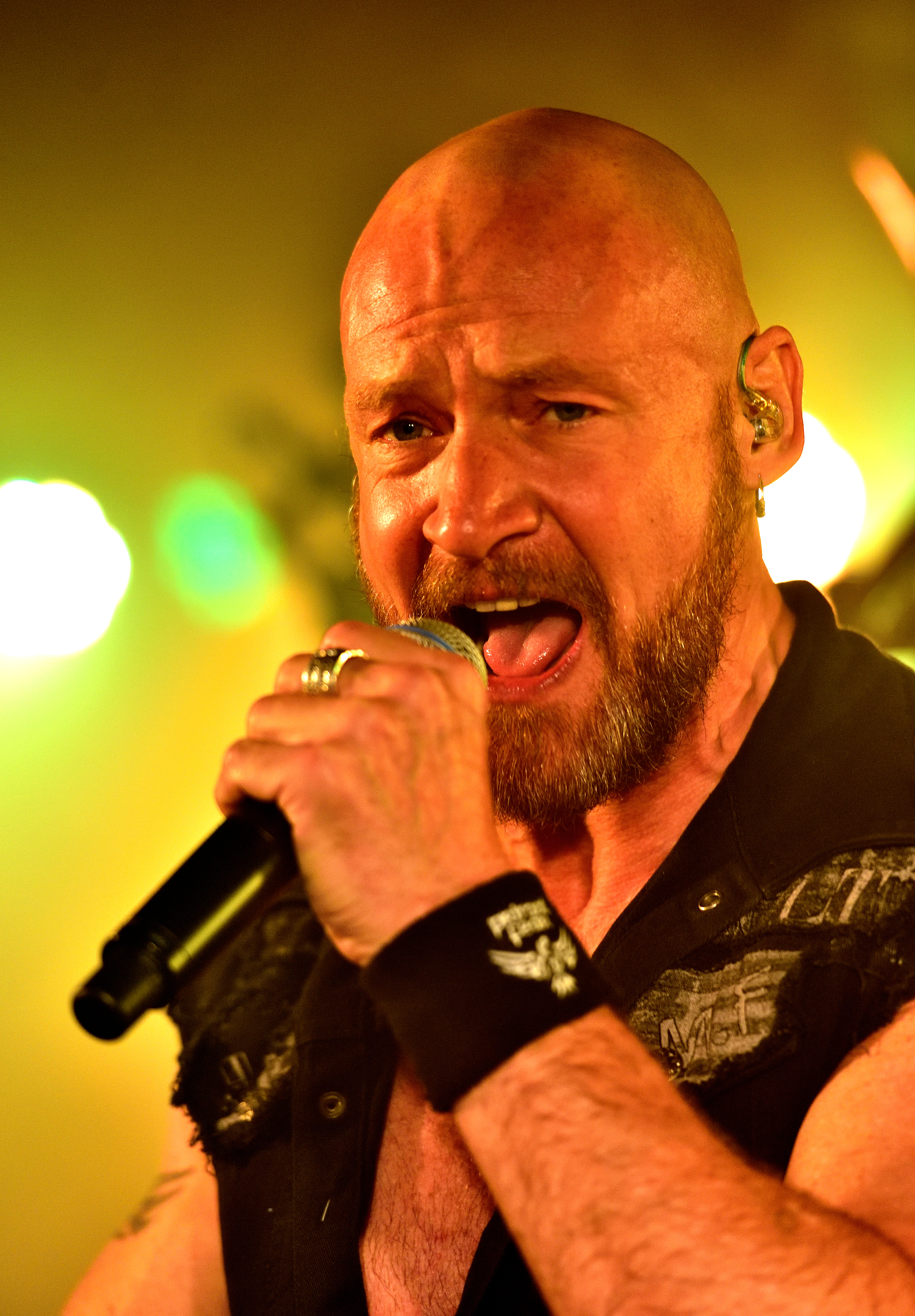
- Scheepers performing with Primal Fear in 2016

Background information
- Born: 5 February 1965 (age 60); Esslingen, West Germany
- Genres: Heavy metal, power metal
- Occupation: Singer
- Years active: 1983–present
- Member of: Primal Fear
- Formerly of: Gamma Ray

Ralf Scheepers (born 5 February 1965) is a German singer and the lead vocalist for the heavy metal band Primal Fear. He has also sung in Gamma Ray and Tyran' Pace. Scheepers has also provided guest vocals for the bands Avantasia, Xandria, Scanner, Therion, Ayreon and Shadow Gallery, and worked with Tom Galley on Phenomena's Blind Faith album. He currently provides instruction for all around singing, music, studio and recording/processing techniques at the RS Vocal Works in Baltmannsweiler, Germany. Writer Paul Stenning has described him as "the greatest example of strength in metal."

== Trivia ==
The formation of Primal Fear (1997) coincided with the rumor that Scheepers was a candidate to succeed Rob Halford at Judas Priest the year before. In an interview from 2012, Scheepers confirmed that he knew of his name on the shortlist, but at the same time pointed out that he had never been invited to a rehearsal. The then Priest guitarist K.K. Downing explicitly mentions Scheepers in his autobiography ('Heavy Duty: Days and Nights in Judas Priest', 2018), as one of the few suitable candidates: "And there weren't many candidates. Ralf Scheepers, who at that time was singing in Gamma Ray, was definitely a possibility, but nothing came of that." .

== Discography ==
Studio albums

- Scheepers (2011)

=== Tyran' Pace ===
- Eye to Eye (1983)
- Long Live Metal (1984)
- Watching You (1986)

=== Gamma Ray ===
Studio albums

- Heading for Tomorrow (1990)
- Sigh No More (1991)
- Insanity and Genius (1993)

=== F.B.I. ===
- Hell on Wheels (1993)

=== Blackwelder ===
- Survival of the Fittest (2015)

=== Enzo and the Glory Ensemble ===
- In the Name of the Father (2015)
- In the Name of the Son (2017)
- In the Name of the World Spirit (2020)

== Filmography ==
=== As actor ===
- Dreath: Sidestories Underground (short, 2012) – Soldier
- Devil's Five (2021) – Ansel Schneider

=== Soundtrack ===
- Gamma Ray: Skeletons & Majesties Live (video 2012) (lyrics: "The Spririt", "Brothers") / (writer: "Brothers")
