= Dukebox =

Compilation album by Jorn
- Released: August 28, 2009
- Genre: Hard rock; heavy metal
- Label: AFM Records

Jorn chronology
Spirit Black (2009)	Dukebox (2009)	Dio (2010)

Professional ratings
Review scores
Source	Rating
Jukebox:Metal	2/5 stars

Dukebox is a compilation album by Jørn Lande's solo project Jorn, released on August 28, 2009.

The album features songs from Jorn's previous solo albums, Starfire, Worldchanger, Out to Every Nation, The Duke, and Lonely Are The Brave.

Like The Gathering, most of the songs on the album are re-mastered. The album contains "many highlights" from Jorn's previous solo albums and was said that it "will be an interesting item for all die-hard fans and 'newcomers' as well," according to a press release.

== Track listing ==
1. "Man of the Dark" - 5:08 (Lonely Are The Brave)
2. "Starfire" - 5:26 (Starfire)
3. "Young Forever" (new version) - 4:51 (Out to Every Nation)
4. "Soul of the Wind" - 5:55 (Lonely Are The Brave)
5. "Living with Wolves" - 3:53 (Out to Every Nation)
6. "War of the World" - 5:26 (Lonely Are The Brave)
7. "Sunset Station" - 4:29 (Worldchanger)
8. "We Brought the Angels Down" - 4:29 (The Duke)
9. "The Inner Road" - 4:53 (Lonely Are The Brave)
10. "Tungur Knivur" - 6:15 (Worldchanger)
11. "Stormcrow" - 3:44 (The Duke)
12. "Out to Every Nation" (new version) - 4:36 (Out to Every Nation)
13. "Lonely Are the Brave" - 4:11 (Lonely Are The Brave)
14. "Blacksong" - 5:36 (The Duke)
15. "Shadow People" - 3:33 (Lonely Are The Brave)
16. "Duke of Love" - 4:35 (The Duke)

== Personnel ==
- Jørn Lande - lead vocals
- Jørn Viggo Lofstad - guitar
- Tore Moren - guitar
- Sid Ringsby - bass
- Willy Bendiksen - drums
