= The Gathering (Jorn album) =

Greatest hits album by Jørn Lande
- Released: 29 January 2007
- Genre: Heavy metal; hard rock; progressive metal
- Label: Frontiers (International); Locomotive (US)
- Producer: Tommy Hansen

Jørn Lande chronology
The Duke (2006)	The Gathering (2007)	Unlocking the Past (2007)

Professional ratings
Review scores
Source	Rating
Allmusic	4.5/5 stars
RevelationZ	8.5/10 stars
Hard Rock Hideout	9/10 stars
About.com	3.5/5 stars

The Gathering is a compilation album by Jørn Lande. It was released on 29 January 2007, the same day as his new covers album Unlocking the Past. It was released exactly a year later, on 29 January 2008, in North America.

The album features songs from Lande's solo project Jorn as well as songs from his time with such bands as Millenium, ARK and The Snakes as well as Lande's collaboration with Symphony X lead singer Russell Allen.

Although the album is a greatest hits collection, most of the tracks on the album were reworked and remastered especially for the compilation. Some have even been re-recorded.

== Track listing ==
1. "Something Real" (Lande/Lofstad) - 5:24 (remastered)
  - from Jorn's "Out to Every Nation"
2. "Gonna Find the Sun" (Lande/Moody) - 3:08 (remastered)
  - from The Snakes' "Once Bitten"
3. "Bridges Will Burn" (Lande/Moren) - 5:33
  - from Jorn's "Worldchanger"
4. "Young Forever" (Lande/Lofstad) - 4:50 (remastered)
  - from Jorn's "Out to Every Nation"
5. "Tungur Knivur" (Lande) - 6:17
  - from Jorn's "Worldchanger"
6. "One Day We Will Put Out the Sun" (Lande/Lofstad) - 6:00 (re-recorded)
  - from Jorn's "Out to Every Nation"
7. "Sunset Station" (Lande/Moren) - 4:28
  - from Jorn's "Worldchanger"
8. "Hourglass" (Lande/Santolla/Binder/Hanson) - 6:41
  - from Millenium's "Hourglass"
9. "Gate of Tears" (Lande) - 4:52 (re-recorded)
  - from Jorn's "Starfire"
10. "House of Cards" (Lande/Moren) - 4:57
  - from Jorn's "Worldchanger"
11. "My Own Way" (Karlsson) - 4:45
  - from Allen/Lande's "The Battle"
12. "Worldchanger" (Lande) - 4:49
  - from Jorn's "Worldchanger"
13. "Abyss of Evil" (Lande) - 4:40 (re-recorded)
  - from Jorn's "Starfire"
14. "Where the Winds Blow" (Lande/Macaluso/Østby) - 4:44 (re-recorded)
  - from ARK's "ARK"
15. "Christine" (Lande) - 2:52
  - from Jorn's "Worldchanger"
16. "Big" (Lande/Lofstad) - 3:39
  - from Jorn's "Out to Every Nation" (bonus track)

== Personnel ==
Main line-up

- Jørn Lande - lead vocals
- Jørn Viggo Lofstad - guitar on tracks 1, 2, 4, 6, 9, 13, 14, 16
- Tore Moren - guitar on tracks 1, 3, 4, 5, 6, 7, 9, 10, 12, 13, 15
- Morty Black - bass on tracks 1, 2, 6, 9, 13, 14
- Willy Bendiksen - drums on tracks 2, 6, 9, 13

Featured musicians

- Sid Ringsby - bass on tracks 3, 5, 7, 10, 12, 15
- Jan Axel Blomberg - drums on tracks 3, 5, 7, 10, 12, 15
- Stian Kristoffersen - drums on tracks 1, 4, 14, 16
- Magnus Rosén - bass on tracks 4, 16
- Ralph Santolla - guitar, keyboards on track 8
- Shane French - guitar on track 8
- Oliver Hanson - drums on track 8
- Manfred Binder - bass on track 8
- Don Airey - keyboards on tracks 8
- Magnus Karlsson - guitar, bass, keyboards on track 11
- Jaime Salazar - drums on track 11

== Release history ==
Country	Date
Europe	29 January 2007
United States	29 January 2008
