= Live in Black =

Live album by Jorn
- Released: 27 August 2011
- Recorded: 10 June 2010
- Genre: Hard rock, heavy metal
- Label: Frontiers Records
- Producer: Jørn Lande

Jorn chronology
Dio (2010)	Live in Black (2011)	Bring Heavy Rock to the Land (2012)

Live in Black is the second double CD/DVD live album by Norwegian singer Jørn Lande's solo band Jorn. It was recorded at the 2010 Sweden Rock Festival on 10 June. The setlist features mostly songs from Jorn previous last two studio albums Lonely Are The Brave and Spirit Black as well as some setlist regular songs featured on the albums The Duke and Worldchanger.

== Track list ==
All tracks are written by Jørn Lande and Jørn Viggo Lofstad, except where noted

Disc 1
No.	Title	Length
1.	"Road of the Cross" (Jørn Lande, Willy Bendiksen)	5:51
2.	"Shadow People"	3:45
3.	"Below" (Jørn Lande, Jimmy Iversen)	5:26
4.	"We Brought The Angels Down"	4:24
5.	"Stormcrow"	3:56
6.	"Spirit Black" (Jørn Lande, Willy Bendiksen, Jimmy Iversen, Sid Ringsby)	4:26
7.	"The Inner Road"	5:12
8.	"Man of the Dark"	5:58

Disc 2
No.	Title	Length
1.	"Blacksong"	4:50
2.	"Guitar Solo" (Tore Moren)	3:30
3.	"Tungur Knivur" (Jørn Lande)	5:28
4.	"Guitar Solo" (Tor Erik Myhre)	2:40
5.	"Rock and Roll Angel" (Jørn Lande, Willy Bendiksen, Sid Ringsby, Jon Berg)	5:17
6.	"Drum Solo" (Willy Bendiksen)	4:34
7.	"Soul of the Wind"	5:36
8.	"Are You Ready" (Phil Lynott, Brian Downey, Scott Gorham, Brian Robertson)	4:17
9.	"War of the World"	8:36

Bonus DVD Material

1. "Song for Ronnie James (videoclip)"
2. "Man of the Dark (videoclip)"

== Personnel ==
- Jørn Lande - lead vocals
- Tore Moren - guitar
- Tor Erik Myhre - guitar
- Nic Anglieri - bass
- Willy Bendiksen - drums

Production

- Mixing and mastering by Tommy Hansen
