= Midijet pro =

A MIDIjet Pro is a long-range, wireless MIDI system created in 2005 by Artisan Classic Organ Inc. Its predecessor (no longer in production) was a short-range wireless MIDI system called MIDIjet. It connects any two pieces of MIDI equipment wirelessly using standard 5-pin MIDI connectors.

The company originally conceived the MIDIjet in order to be able to voice pipe organs from a MIDI controller keyboard from anywhere in the sanctuary or auditorium. When they needed a system that was reliable farther away than the MIDIjet's 30 ft, they developed the MIDIjet Pro which has a maximum range of 500 ft.

It operates on the worldwide, license-free, 2.4 GHz band. It has 31 separate channels. Up to 31 can be used simultaneously in the same environment. Each pair is bound together so that they can only be used with each other.

== Typical applications ==
It was first introduced at the 2005 NAMM show. Its first production unit was sold to Michael Brecker. It is now used by touring professionals worldwide.

- Zen Riffer
- Zendrum percussion controllers
- MIDI keyboards
- Roland AX-7 and Roland AX-1
- EWI Electronic Wind Controllers
- Nyle Steiner's EVI
- Eliminating studio or stage cables
- MIDI switching equipment
- Yamaha Disklavier player pianos
