= Symphonic (Jorn album) =

Compilation album by Jorn
- Released: January 25, 2013
- Recorded: Late 2012
- Genre: Symphonic metal
- Label: Frontiers Records
- Producer: Jørn Lande

Jorn chronology
Bring Heavy Rock to the Land (2012)	Symphonic (2013)	Traveller (2013)

Professional ratings
Review scores
Source	Rating
Angry Metal Guy	3/5 stars
Blistering	7/10 stars
Jukebox:Metal	3.5/5 stars

Symphonic is a compilation album by Jørn Lande's solo project Jorn. The album differs from the previous compilation albums in how orchestra arrangements have been added to Jorn songs. The album was released on January 25, 2013 in Europe and January 22, 2013 in North America.

The album contains 15 tracks ranging from Jorn's 2004 album, Out to Every Nation, to the 2012 release Bring Heavy Rock to the Land. In addition, it includes cover versions of the Dio track "Rock and Roll Children" and Black Sabbath's "The Mob Rules".

== Track listing ==
1. "I Came to Rock" – 6:33 (Jorn Lande, Jimmy Iversen)
2. "Rock and Roll Children" – 4:27 (Ronnie James Dio)
3. "The World I See" – 6:29 (Lande, Tore Moren)
4. "Burn Your Flame" – 3:30 (Lande, J. Bøgeberg)
5. "Man Of The Dark" – 5:14 (Lande, Lofstad)
6. "My Road" – 2:46 (Lande)
7. "Time to be King" – 4:24 (Masterplan cover)
8. "Black Morning" – 4:37 (Lande, Iversen)
9. "Like Stone In Water" – 5:19 (Lande, Moren, Jorn Viggo Lofstad)
10. "Vision Eyes" – 4:56 (Lande, Lofstad)
11. "War Of The World" – 5:29 (Lande, Lofstad)
12. "Behind The Clown" – 4:12 (Lande, Lofstad)
13. "A Thousand Cuts" – 9:01 (Lande, Moren)
14. "Mob Rules" – 4:06 (Black Sabbath cover)
15. "Through Day And Night" (Japan bonus track) (Lande, Lofstad)

== Personnel ==
=== Musicians ===
- Jørn Lande – lead vocals
- Tore Moren – guitars
- Jimmy Iversen – guitars
- Jorn Viggo Lofstad – guitars on tracks 5, 9, 10, 11, 12, 15
- Nic Angileri – bass
- Magnus Rosén – bass on tracks 10, 12, 15
- Sid Ringsby – bass on tracks 9, 11
- Willy Bendiksen – drums
- Stian Kristoffersen – drums on tracks 10, 12, 15
- Lasse Lazz Jensen – Symphony Programing on All tracks and guitar on My Road

=== Production ===
- Produced by Jørn Lande
- Mixing and mastering by Tommy Hansen
- Artwork by Felipe Machado Franco

== Release history ==
Country	Date
Europe	25 January 2013
United States	22 January 2013
