= Jorn (band) =

Norwegian hard rock/heavy metal band

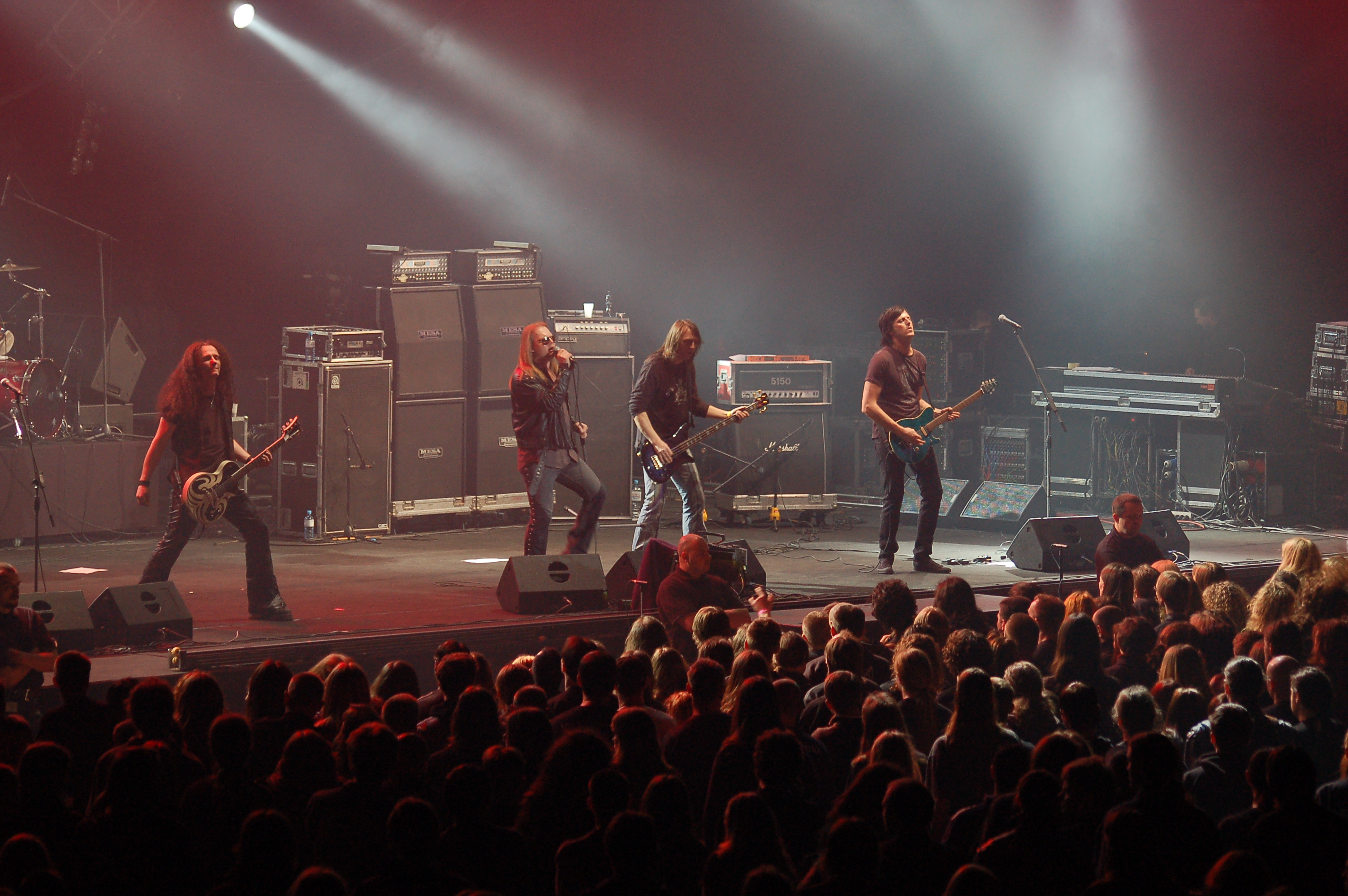
- Jorn performing at Metalmania 2007

Background information
- Origin: Norway
- Genres: Hard rock; heavy metal
- Years active: 2000–present
- Labels: Frontiers AFM Records
- Members: Jørn Lande; Alessandro Del Vecchio; Øyvind Strønen; Tore Moren; Francesco Jovino
- Past members: Jørn Viggo Lofstad; Jimmy Iversen; Trond Holter; Tor Erik Myhre; Alex Beyrodt; Morty Black; Nic Angileri; Sid Rigsby; Thomas Bekkevold; John Macaluso; Willy Bendiksen; Others; See below.
- Website: jornlande.com

Jorn is a Norwegian hard rock and metal band fronted by vocalist Jørn Lande. Other members include guitarists Tore Moren and Adrian SB, Alessandro Del Vecchio on keyboards, bassist Øyvind Strønen and drummer Francesco Jovino. The band was established in 2000 by Lande and the debut album Starfire was released the same year. For the 25 years anniversary in 2025, JORN had 15 studio albums and 3 live albums released. Live they have done multiple tours and festival-appearances. The band is active touring and working on new material.

== Band members ==
=== Band members/guests ===
Current lineup:

- Tore Moren – guitars (Worldchanger, The Duke, Unlocking the Past, The Gathering, Live in America, Lonely Are The Brave, Spirit Black, Dio, Live in Black, Bring Heavy Rock To The Land, Live on Death Road, guest on Starfire, additional guitars on Heavy Rock Radio)
- Francesco Jovino – drums
- Adrian SB - Guitars
- Øyvind Strønen - Bass
- Alessandro Del Vecchio – keyboards (Heavy Rock Radio, Life On Death Road, Live on Death Road)

Former:

Guitars:

- Jørn Viggo Lofstad – guitars (Out to Every Nation, The Duke, Unlocking the Past, The Gathering, Live in America, Lonely Are The Brave, additional guitars on Heavy Rock Radio)
- Jimmy Iversen – guitars (Spirit Black, Bring Heavy Rock To The Land, Traveller, additional guitars on Heavy Rock Radio)
- Trond Holter – guitars (Traveller, Heavy Rock Radio)
- Tor Erik Myhre – guitars (Dio, Live in Black)
- Alex Beyrodt – guitars (Life On Death Road)
- Igor Gianola – guitars (Live, additional guitars on Spirit Black and Dio)
- Jon Berg – guitars (additional guitars on Spirit Black)
- Tore Østby – guitars (guest on Starfire, Unlocking the Past)
- Ralph Santolla – guitars (guest on Starfire, Unlocking the Past)
- Ronni Le Tekrø – guitars (guest on Starfire, Unlocking the Past)
- Gus G – guitars (guest on Life On Death Road)
- Craig Goldy – guitars (guest on Life On Death Road)

Bass:

- Morty Black – bass (The Duke, The Gathering, Unlocking the Past)
- Nic Angileri – bass (Dio, Live in Black, Bring Heavy Rock To The Land, additional bass on Spirit Black and Heavy Rock Radio)
- Steinar Krokmo – bass (Live in America, guest on Unlocking the Past)
- Thomas Bekkevold – bass (Heavy Rock Radio)
- Magnus Rosén – bass (Out to Every Nation)
- Bernt Jansen – bass (Traveller)
- Mat Sinner – bass (Life On Death Road)
- Espen Mjöen – bass (additional Bass on Lonely Are The Brave, Spirit Black and Traveller)

Drums:

- Sid Ringsby – bass (Worldchanger, Lonely Are The Brave, Spirit Black, Live on Death Road, additional bass on Heavy Rock Radio)
- Willy Bendiksen – drums (The Duke, Unlocking the Past, The Gathering, Live in America, Lonely Are The Brave, Spirit Black, Dio, Live in Black, Bring Heavy Rock To The Land, Traveller, guest on Starfire, additional drums on Heavy Rock Radio)
- Francesco Jovino – drums (Heavy Rock Radio, Life On Death Road, Live on Death Road)
- Stian Kristoffersen – drums (Out to Every Nation, guest on Live in America)
- Jan Axel von Blomberg – drums (Worldchanger)
- Christian Svendsen – drums (Live)
- John Macaluso – drums (Starfire)
- Jon A . Narum – drums, samples, bass, guitars, melotrone (guest on Starfire)
- Beata Polak – drums (Live on Death Road)

Keyboards:

- Dag Stokke – keyboards (Starfire)
- Ronny Tegner – keyboards (Out to Every Nation)
- Lasse Jensen – keyboards (additional keyboards on Heavy Rock Radio)
- Lasse Finbråten – keyboards (guest on Live in America)

== Discography ==
=== Albums ===
Year	Album	Charts			Certification
Year	Album	NOR	BEL (Wa)	SWE	Certification
2000	Starfire	–	–	–	
2001	Worldchanger	–	–	–	
2004	Out to Every Nation	–	–	–	
2006	The Duke	–	–	–	
2008	Lonely Are the Brave	28	–	42	
2009	Spirit Black	21	–	52	
2010	Dio (Tribute album)	37	–	53	
2012	Bring Heavy Rock to the Land	27	126	34	
2013	Symphonic (remixed album)	23	196	–	
2013	Traveller	12	–	37	
2016	Heavy Rock Radio (cover album)	23	135	53	
2017	Life On Death Road	–	84	–	
2018	50 Years On Earth (The Anniversary Box Set)	–	–	–	
2020	Heavy Rock Radio II: Executing The Classics (cover album)	–	–	–	
2022	Over the Horizon Radar	–	–	–	

Live albums

Year	Album	Charts			Certification
Year	Album	NOR	BEL (Wa)	SWE	Certification
2007	Live in America	28	–	42	
2011	Live in Black	–	–	–	
2019	Live on Death Road	–	–	–	

Compilation and other albums

- 2007: Unlocking the Past (album of covers)
- 2007: The Gathering (compilation album)
- 2009: Dukebox (compilation album)
