= Live in America (Jorn album) =

Live in America!

Live album by Jorn
- Released: September 24, 2007 (CD); January 23, 2009 (DVD)
- Recorded: Progpower USA, Atlanta, United States, 16 September 2006
- Genre: Hard rock, heavy metal
- Length: Disc One: 39:51; Disc Two: 41:44 (excluding studio tracks); Studio tracks: 13:12
- Label: Frontiers

Jorn chronology
Unlocking the Past (2007)	Live in America! (2007)	Lonely Are the Brave (2008)

Professional ratings
Review scores
Source	Rating
Metal Temple	4.5/5 stars

Live in America! is the first live album by Jørn Lande. It was released under his stage name Jorn on September 24, 2007.

Jorn's solo band's line-up is the same as in the last albums The Duke and Unlocking the Past, with the exception of bassist Morty Black who was replaced by Pagan's Mind bassist Steinar Krokmo (who contributed to Jorn's solo records in the past). The album was recorded on the first show Jorn ever did in the US, on 16 September 2006 where he headlined the Progpower USA festival in Atlanta.

The album features four live cover songs: "Are You Ready" and "Cold Sweat" by Thin Lizzy, "Straight Through the Heart" by Ronnie James Dio and "Perfect Strangers" by Deep Purple, as well as medley of covers to five Whitesnake songs, including the hit single "Here I Go Again". In the album, Jorn performs many of his solo songs, as well as songs from his time with bands such as Masterplan, Beyond Twilight and The Snakes.

Additionally, the album features three studio tracks: a new re-made and re-recorded version to "Out to Every Nation" from the album Out to Every Nation, a Black Sabbath covers medley featuring the songs "Lonely Is the Word" and "Letters from Earth", which previously appeared on the covers album Unlocking the Past, and "Sacrificial Feelings", a track originally from the Once Bitten album of The Snakes, which was also re-made and re-recorded.

On January 23, 2009, the album was released on DVD.

== Track listing ==
All songs written by Jørn Lande and Jørn Viggo Lofstad except where noted.

=== Disc one ===
1. "We Brought the Angels Down" – 4:49
2. "Blacksong" – 5:21
3. "Duke of Love" – 5:08
4. "Are You Ready" (Lynott/Downey/Gorham/Robertson) (Thin Lizzy cover) – 3:06
5. "Cold Sweat" (Lynott/Sykes) (Thin Lizzy cover) – 3:13
6. "Drum Solo" (Willy Bendiksen) – 4:50
7. "Out to Every Nation" – 5:11
8. "Guitar Solo" (Jørn Viggo Lofstad) – 3:17
9. "Straight Through the Heart" (Dio/Bain) (Dio cover) – 4:54

=== Disc two ===
1. "Godless And Wicked" (Lande/Zierler) (Beyond Twilight cover) – 4:21
2. "Soulburn" (Grapow/Kusch/Lande) (Masterplan cover) – 6:25
3. "Devilbird" (instrumental) (Tore Moren) – 1:49
4. "Perfect Strangers" (Blackmore/Gillan/Glover) (Deep Purple cover) – 6:40
5. "Gonna Find the Sun" (Lande/Moody) (The Snakes cover) – 4:05
6. The Whitesnake Medley: "Come On"/"Sweet Talker"/"Crying In the Rain"/"Here I Go Again"/"Give Me All Your Love" – 17:53
7. "Out to Every Nation" (2007 version, studio track) – 4:37
8. "Lonely Is the Word"/"Letters from Earth" (Dio/Butler/Iommi) (Black Sabbath cover) (studio track) – 5:27
9. "Sacrificial Feelings" (bonus studio track) – 3:48

=== DVD track list ===
1. "We Brought the Angels Down" – 4:49
2. "Blacksong" – 5:21
3. "Duke of Love" – 5:08
4. "Are You Ready" (Lynott/Downey/Gorham/Robertson) (Thin Lizzy cover) – 3:06
5. "Cold Sweat" (Lynnot/Sykes) (Thin Lizzy cover) – 3:13
6. "Drum Solo" (Willy Bendiksen) – 4:50
7. "Out to Every Nation" – 5:11
8. "Guitar Solo" (Jørn Viggo Lofstad) – 3:17
9. "Straight Through the Heart" (Dio/Bain) (Dio cover) – 4:54
10. "Godless and Wicked" (Lande/Zierler) (Beyond Twilight cover) – 4:21
11. "Soulburn" (Grapow/Kusch/Lande) (Masterplan cover) – 6:25
12. "Devilbird" (Tore Moren) – 1:49
13. "Perfect Strangers" (Blackmore/Gillan/Glover) (Deep Purple cover) – 6:40
14. "Gonna Find The Sun" (Lande/Moody) (The Snakes cover) – 4:05
15. The Whitesnake Medley: "Come On"/"Sweet Talker"/"Crying In The Rain"/"Here I Go Again"/"Give Me All Your Love" – 17:53

== Personnel ==
- Jørn Lande – lead vocals
- Jørn Viggo Lofstad – guitar
- Tore Moren – guitar
- Steinar Krokmo – bass
- Willy Bendiksen – drums

Guests

- Stian L. Kristoffersen – drums – on tracks "Godless And Wicked", "Soulburn" & "Perfect Strangers"
- Lasse Finbråten – keyboards – on tracks "Out to Every Nation", "Godless And Wicked", "Devilbird" & "Perfect Strangers"
