= Lonely Are the Brave (Jørn Lande album) =

Studio album by Jorn
- Released: June 6, 2008
- Studios: Mediamaker Studios, Pagan Studios and Loco Studios, Norway
- Genres: Heavy metal; hard rock
- Length: 45:58
- Label: Frontiers
- Producer: Jørn Lande

Jorn chronology
Live in America (2007)	Lonely Are the Brave (2008)	Spirit Black (2009)

Professional ratings
Review scores
Source	Rating
Sleaze Roxx	4/5 stars
Hard Rock Hideout	8/10 stars
Only Rock	3.5/5 stars
RevelationZ	8.5/10 stars

Lonely Are the Brave is the fifth studio album by Jørn Lande's solo project Jorn.

Lande recorded a cover of "Stormbringer" by Deep Purple. It was released as a bonus track on the European and limited editions, and was later reused for Heavy Rock Radio with additional sound effects layered in.

== Track listing ==
All songs written by Jørn Lande and Jørn Viggo Lofstad, except where noted.

No.	Title	Writer(s)	Length
1.	"Lonely Are the Brave"		4:17
2.	"Night City"		5:27
3.	"War of the World"		5:33
4.	"Shadow People"		3:34
5.	"Soul of the Wind"		6:03
6.	"Man of the Dark"		5:11
7.	"Promises"		4:44
8.	"The Inner Road"		4:56
9.	"Hellfire" (Beyond Twilight cover)	Lande, Ron Zierler	6:13
Total length:			45:58

Japanese Edition Bonus Track
No.	Title	Writer(s)	Length
10.	"Showdown" (The Snakes cover)	Jørn Lande	4:25
Total length:			50:23

European & Limited Edition Bonus Tracks
No.	Title	Writer(s)	Length
10.	"Stormbringer" (Deep Purple cover)	Ritchie Blackmore, David Coverdale	3:53
11.	"Like Stone in Water"	Lande, Lofstad, Tore Moren	4:59
Total length:			54:50

== Personnel ==
- Jørn Lande - lead vocals
- Jørn Viggo Lofstad - guitar
- Tore Moren - guitar
- Sid Ringsby - bass
- Espen Mjøen - bass on track 5 & 6
- Willy Bendiksen – drums

=== Production ===
- Tommy Hansen – mixed & mastered
- Thomas Ewerhard – artwork
