= Pentakill =

Virtual heavy metal band

- Pentakill promotional art. From left to right: Yorick, Karthus, Mordekaiser, Sona, and Olaf.

Background information
- Origin: League of Legends by Riot Games
- Genres: Heavy metal; power metal; progressive metal; symphonic metal
- Years active: 2014–present
- Label: Riot Games
- Website: Pentakill

Pentakill is a virtual heavy metal band associated with the League of Legends universe. consisting of five themed versions of League of Legends characters Yorick, Karthus, Mordekaiser, Sona, and Olaf with Kayle and Veigo as a guest appearance. With their debut album Smite and Ignite in 2014. Their music is primarily composed and performed by Riot Games' in-house music team but features cameos by various metal musicians. For example, Jørn Lande as a lead vocalist or Joe Atlan as the keyboardist. Their second album, Grasp of the Undying, reached Number 1 on the iTunes metal charts in 2017. Their third album, III: Lost Chapter, premiered using an interactive "live" concert.

Pentakill was developed by Riot Games, the company behind League of Legends. The band started as cosmetic skins for League of Legends game characters during the 2010s. Because people joked about wanting to hear the band music. Riot games decide to bring the band to life with full length album. on June 3, 2014 Riot Games release their debut, Smite and Ignite album on Youtube.

== Appearance/History ==
Pentakill started as a cosmetic skin for champions in the game League of Legends in 2010. Four years later in June 3, 2014 They release their debut album Smite and Ignite album on Youtube. An 8-track Hevay metal, Symphonic Metal, and progressive metal mix of songs in English. The songs in the album are sung by Jørn Lande as the character Karthus, with ZP Theart as a guest vocalist. On August 4, 2017, they release their second album, II: Grasp of the Undying. A 10 Track album, with a promotional music video for the song Mortal Reminder. On August 3, 2017. This album introduces a new vocalist, Noora Louhimo, as the character Kayle. On September 8, 2021, They released their third album, III: Lost Chapter. A 11-track album with an interactive album experience event to promote the album

The interactive album experience was a "live" concert that was a virtual concert. The singers and band member use motion capture to act as their characters, with the stage set and effects that would be impossible to recreate in real life. During the live concert, audiences can interact with the concert, which can affect the proformace or change how the song will be sung.

In Riot Games franchises

Pentakill Skins of Karthus, Kayle, Mordekaiser, Olaf, Sona, Yorick, and Veigo, depicting how they appear in the band, are available to purchase in the game League of Legends. Skins are for cosmetic purposes only. Skins cost around 6-10$. The skin first sell in 2014 along with the album to promote both the game cosmetic and songs.

In the spin-off game Wild Rift, they appeared as cosmetic skins later in January 2021 with some minor changes to the skin.

In Teamfight Tactics, for the game's 10th set, Remix Rumble. Pentakill was present as a team composition for players to play.

== Members ==
The members of Pentakill consist of six characters from the League of Legends game. Because it is a virtual band, they are composed of virtual characters with their own story of the band. With musicians behind the characters as their avatars.

Karthus – Lead vocalist; (Voiced by Jørn Lande). In the story, he is an undead demon. Reborn after his murder at the hand of Mordekaiser, imbued him with undeath before steeping his voice in the fury of countless lost souls. Karthus resumed singing, earning himself a fearsome reputation. He set about establishing himself as the Shadow Isles’ finest vocalist, but soon grew tired of the lack of local instrumental talent. Remembering Mordekaiser’s unmatched playing, Karthus sought passage back to Valoran, and enlisted the help of the only musician Karthus felt was his equal: the bass-playing ferryman, Yorick. Jørn Lande, the voice behind the character gives him a iconic voice to the character giving him a rich, raspy, mid-to-high baritenor voice.

Kayle – Female vocalist; (Voiced by Noora Louhimo). In the story, she is a fallen rock angel. Noora Louhimo is the voice behind the character known for her voice from the band Battle Beast. She gives a soaring, aggressive, high-octave voice that harmonizes well with Jorn Lande voice.

Mordekaiser – Guitarist; (Played by Jason 'chupacobbler' Willey) In the story, he is a prodigal guitarist just minutes after his birth. Desperate to find his instrumental equal, Mordekaiser traveled far and wide in search of a legendary guitar known only as “Numero Uno.” After years of searching, he found it buried deep within a Shuriman crypt. But as Mordekaiser grasped the instrument’s neck for the first time, it too grasped him, filling him with murderous intent. On one fateful band practice, he turned berserk, murdering his bandmates, including their up-and-coming singer, Karthus. The person behind lead guitar is Jason 'chupacobbler' Willey is a sound designer who's work for Riot Games.

Olaf – Drummer; (Played by Gregg Bissonette, Mike Pitman, Tommy Lee) In the story, he's a drunk man who stepped into a bar where the other four band members are. He challenge Yorick to an arm wrestle. Legend states that the two were locked in arm-on-arm combat for days, sustaining themselves with whiskey and peanuts. Finally, Karthus, bored of the deadlock, offered Olaf a place in the band. Multiple drummers had collaborated in making songs giving each drummers a chance to express their own style in the songs.

Sona – Keyboard; (Played by Joe 'Keytar Dragon' Atlan, Derek Sherinian) In the story, she is a mute pianist. Who, through years of silence, had attuned her hearing to withstand all manner of metal. Impressed with both her resilience and her ability to tear up her keys while covered in blood, the three offered Sona a place in their band, and thus Pentakill Sona was born. Like the drums, the keyboard sounds in the band have various artists behind them. Some of the songs have Riot Games in-house musicians working behind the songs.

Yorick – Bassist; (Played by Eugene 'kyugene' Kang) In the story, Yorick spent his early years on the Shadow Isles torturing ghouls and ghosts with his pounding bass playing. But as the years passed by, the ghouls started to enjoy the head-rattling virtuoso’s playing. Eventually they formed Yorick’s hardcore fanbase and followed him throughout the Shadow Isles, earning him the nickname “Brown Note” thanks to their muddy coloration. After ferrying Karthus back to Valoran, Yorick decided to join him. Eugene 'kyugene' Kang is the person behind the bass. He's an audio director at Sony.

== Musicians involved ==
Album Musician
Album Musician	Smite and Ignite (2014)	Grasp of the Undying (2017)	III: Lost Chapter (2021)
Vocalists
Jørn Lande	Yes	Yes	Yes
Noora Louhimo		Yes	Yes
Per Johansson		Yes	Yes
ZP Theart	Yes		
Tyler "Telle" Smith			Yes
Tre Watson			Yes
Instrumentalists
Derek Sherinian	Yes		
Danny Lohner	Yes	Yes	
Joe Atlan		Yes	Yes
Gregg Bissonette	Yes		
Tommy Lee		Yes	
Scott Kirkland		Yes	
Benjamin Ellis			Yes
Tre Watson			Yes

== Discography ==
- Smite and Ignite (2014)
- II: Grasp of the Undying (2017)
- III: Lost Chapter (2021)
- 2026 World Championship Theme (2026)
