= Heavy Rock Radio =

Studio album by Jorn
- Released: June 3, 2016
- Genre: Hard rock; heavy metal
- Length: 53:00
- Label: Frontiers Records
- Producer: Jørn Lande

Jorn chronology
Traveller (2013)	Heavy Rock Radio (2016)	Life On Death Road (2017)

Heavy Rock Radio is an album by Jørn Lande's solo project Jorn. It consists of cover songs from artists that inspired the singer to start his career in music. Jorn has previously released albums of cover songs in 2007, with the album Unlocking the Past, and in 2010, with his tribute to Ronnie James Dio on the album Dio.

This time, instead of focusing on recording more obscure rock songs from the 1970s and '80s, Jorn chose to do an album with more well known songs, including big hits such as the Eagles's "Hotel California", Journey's "Don't Stop Believin'" and Queen's "Killer Queen". Some songs in the album have Jorn showing his admiration for pop artists such as Kate Bush, Frida and John Farnham, as well as recording two songs from the 2000s, namely Iron Maiden's "The Final Frontier" and Paul Stanley's "Live to Win." He also included his typical tributes to Ronnie James Dio, with Dio's "Rainbow in the Dark" and Black Sabbath's "Die Young", and a cover of Foreigner's "Rev on the Red Line."

== Track listing ==
No.	Title	Writer(s)	Original artist (date)	Length
1.	"I Know There's Something Going On"	Russ Ballard	Frida (1982)	4:55
2.	"Running Up That Hill"	Kate Bush	Kate Bush (1985)	5:04
3.	"Rev on the Red Line"	Lou Gramm, Al Greenwood	Foreigner (1979)	3:56
4.	"You're the Voice"	Andy Qunta, Keith Reid, Maggie Ryder, Chris Thompson	John Farnham (1986)	3:56
5.	"Live to Win"	Paul Stanley, Desmond Child, Andreas Carlsson	Paul Stanley (2006)	3:53
6.	"Don't Stop Believin'"	Jonathan Cain, Steve Perry, Neal Schon	Journey (1981)	4:42
7.	"Killer Queen"	Freddie Mercury	Queen (1974)	3:27
8.	"Hotel California"	Don Felder, Don Henley, Glenn Frey	Eagles (1976)	6:31
9.	"Rainbow in the Dark"	Ronnie James Dio, Vinny Appice, Jimmy Bain, Vivian Campbell	Dio (1983)	5:00
10.	"The Final Frontier"	Adrian Smith, Steve Harris	Iron Maiden (2010)	5:52
11.	"Stormbringer"	Ritchie Blackmore, David Coverdale	Deep Purple (1974)	3:53
12.	"Die Young"	Dio, Tony Iommi, Geezer Butler, Bill Ward	Black Sabbath (1980)	5:13
13.	"I Don't Know (Japanese Bonus Track)"	Ozzy Osbourne, Randy Rhoads, Bob Daisley	Ozzy Osbourne (1980)	5:08

== Personnel ==
- Jørn Lande - Lead & Backing Vocals, Producer
- Trond Holter - Guitar, Mixing
- Thomas Bekkevold - Bass
- Francesco Jovino - Drums
- Alessandro Del Vecchio - Keyboards

=== Additional musicians ===
- Tore Moren - guitar on "Rainbow in the Dark"
- Jimmy Iversen - guitar on "Rainbow in the Dark"
- Nic Angileri - bass on "Rainbow in the Dark"
- Lasse Jensen - keyboards on "Rainbow in the Dark"
- Willy Bendiksen - drums on "Rainbow in the Dark" and "Stormbringer"
- Jørn Viggo Lofstad - guitar on "Stormbringer"
- Sid Ringsby - bass on "Stormbringer"
