= Traveller (Jorn album) =

Studio album by Jorn
- Released: June 14, 2013
- Recorded: 2013
- Genre: Hard rock; heavy metal
- Label: Frontiers Records
- Producer: Jørn Lande and Trond Holter

Jorn chronology
Symphonic (2013)	Traveller (2013)	Heavy Rock Radio (2016)

Professional ratings
Review scores
Source	Rating
Jukebox:Metal	4/5 stars

Traveller is the eighth studio album by Jørn Lande's solo project Jorn.

The album was released on June 14, 2013, in Europe and June 11, 2013, in North America. It is characterized by its heavy yet melodic sound. The album lyrics primarily center around the themes of life and death.

Former guitarist Tore Moren and bassist Nic Angileri left the band after the previous album, Bring Heavy Rock to the Land, to pursue solo careers. The new line-up for Traveller includes Wig Wam guitarist Trond Holter and bassist Bernt Jansen.

A video clip for the title track "Traveller" featuring the new members of JORN was released on May 28, 2013 and a follow-up video for "Cancer Demon" was released five weeks later

Traveller is the only album featuring bassist Bernt Jansen and the last to feature guitarist Jimmy Iversen and Jorn longtime drummer and partner Willy Bendiksen, who left the band on November 4, 2013.

== Track listing ==
1. "Overload" – 5:21 (Jorn Lande)
2. "Cancer Demon" – 4:28 (Lande)
3. "Traveller" – 5:38 (Lande, Trond Holter)
4. "Window Maker" – 4:26 (Lande, Espen Mjøen)
5. "Make Your Engine Scream" – 4:12 (Lande, Holter)
6. "Legend Man" – 4:01 (Lande, Mjøen)
7. "Carry the Black" – 6:09 (Lande, Holter)
8. "Rev On" – 4:43 (Lande, Holter)
9. "Monsoon" – 4:20 (Lande, Jimmy Iversen)
10. "The Man Who Was King" – 5:52 (Lande, Holter)
11. "Arctic Night" (Instrumental) – 3:46 (Japan bonus track)

== Personnel ==
=== Musicians ===
- Jørn Lande – lead vocals
- Trond Holter – guitars
- Jimmy Iversen – guitars
- Bernt Jansen – bass (on tracks 01, 03, 05, 07, 09 & 11)
- Willy Bendiksen – drums
- Espen Mjøen – bass (on tracks 02, 04, 06, 08 & 10)
- Tommy Hansen – keyboards

=== Production ===
- Produced by Jørn Lande and Trond Holter
- Mixing and mastering by Tommy Hansen
- Artwork by Felipe Machado Franco

== Release history ==
Country	Date
Europe	14 June 2013
United States	11 June 2013
