= Roland AX-Synth =

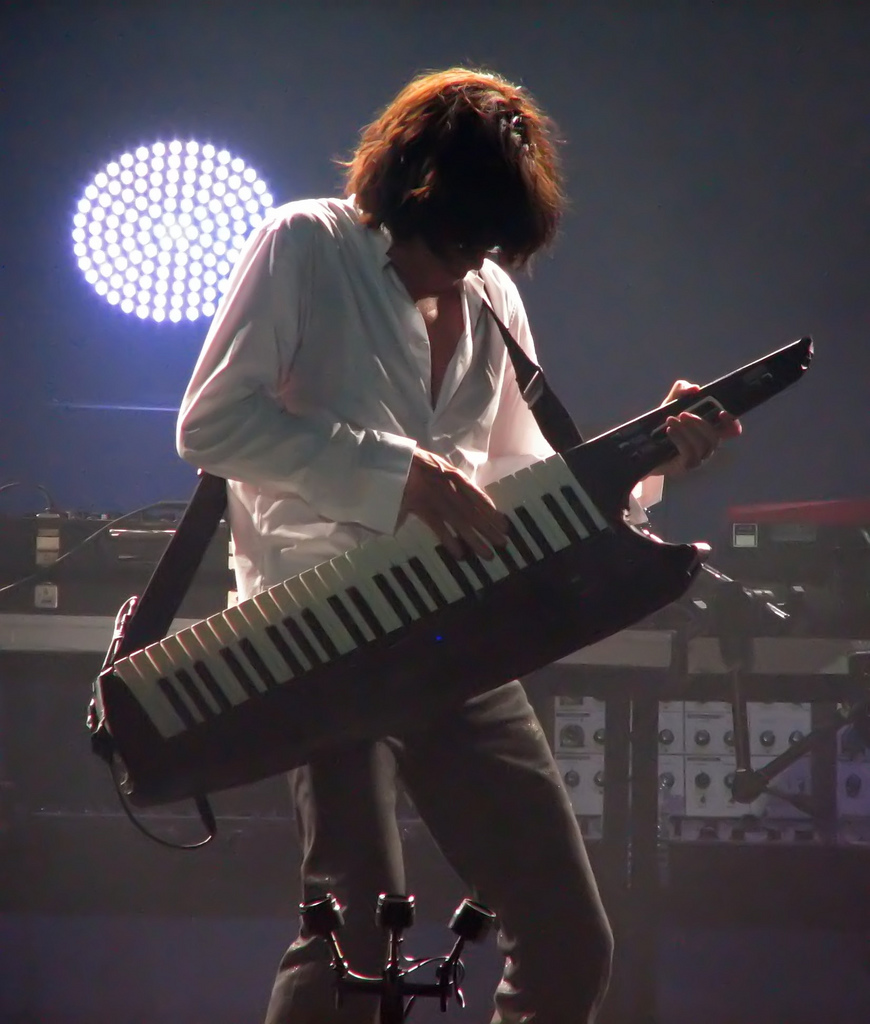
Jean-Michel Jarre playing a Roland AX-Synth during his IN>DOORS tour at the Manchester M.E.N. arena, May 2009

The Roland AX-Synth is a keytar which is manufactured by Roland Corporation and was released in late August 2009. This modernized instrument builds on the features of its predecessor, the Roland AX-7. The most notable change is the addition of an internal synthesizer. A UV black-colored "premium" model called "Black Sparkle" was released in September 2010. The AX-Synth has now been discontinued as well.

== Features ==
The AX-Synth extends the keyboard to 49 keys (from the AX-7's 45) and also adds dedicated V-Link functionality to control audio and video onstage. It runs on eight AA batteries or an external power source. It has 264 built in tones, 128-voice polyphony, and a 3-character LED display. The AX-Synth has all of the AX-7's stage performance functions including the touchpad-like pitch bend ribbon, expression bar, sustain switch, and volume control knob, all on the upper neck of the instrument. As with the AX-7, there is a proprietary "D-Beam" interface, made up of infrared sensors which detect nearby motion.

The AX-Synth also has a wide variety of sounds. Many are synthesized, however, there are many samples of real sounds, from brass to a 'Jazz Scat' sound. This varies depending on the velocity with which the note is played, as seen in "Funky Keytar Duo". The AX-Synth has been often criticized for the large size of the keytar (as seen here dwarfing a large framed Roland rep "Roland AX-SYNTH keytar DEMO") which was necessary to contain all of the sound generating hardware versus the sleek stylings of previous Roland Keytars like the Roland AX-1 and Roland AX-7.

=== MIDI functionality ===
The AX-Synth has full MIDI functionality like the AX-7, but adds an internal synthesizer with 128 voice polyphony and stereo output. It has both MIDI in and out ports and as is common with more recent synthesizers, it also has a USB port which can also be used to communicate MIDI messages, and edit the sounds via Roland's free patch editor/librarian software for PC and Mac.

== Notable users ==
French composer Jean-Michel Jarre used a prototype version of the AX-Synth during the first concerts of his 2009 IN>DOORS tour. Pop star Lady Gaga has several customized versions of the AX-Synth, used for various performances.

Doctor Sung of the Canadian synthfunk band TWRP used to use an AX-Synth which was dubbed "Fuckthrust", but it was retired at their show in Cleveland, Ohio on June 18th 2022.

== See also ==
- Roland AX-1
- Roland AX-7
- Keytar
- Roland AX-09 Lucina
