= Worlds Apart (Allen/Olzon album) =

Studio album by Allen/Olzon
- Released: 6 March 2020
- Genre: Power metal
- Length: 56:01
- Label: Frontiers
- Producer: Magnus Karlsson

"Allen/___" chronology
The Great Divide (as Allen-Lande) (2014)	Worlds Apart (2020)	Army of Dreamers (2022)

Russell Allen chronology
We the People (w/ Adrenaline Mob) (2017)	Worlds Apart (2020)

Anette Olzon chronology
Songs the Night Sings (w/ The Dark Element) (2019)	Worlds Apart (2020)

Worlds Apart is a collaborative album by American singer Russell Allen (Symphony X, Adrenaline Mob, Allen-Lande) and Swedish singer Anette Olzon (ex-Nightwish) under the moniker Allen/Olzon. It was released through Frontiers Records on 6 March 2020.

In 2019, Norwegian singer Jørn Lande announced that there would be no more Allen/Lande albums, citing his own lack of enthusiasm. Russell Allen then went forward with this new collaboration with Olzon, which was announced on 19 December 2019.

The first song to be released was the title track, on 17 January 2020. Later, on 18 February, "Never Die" was streamed. On the same day as the album's release, Frontiers streamed the song "What If I Live". Finally, on 27 March, a lyric video for "I'll Never Leave You" was released.

== Track listing ==
All tracks are written by Magnus Karlsson

No.	Title	Lead vocals	Length
1.	"Never Die"	Russell Allen	5:47
2.	"Worlds Apart"	Allen, Anette Olzon	4:24
3.	"I'll Never Leave You"	Olzon	4:51
4.	"What If I Live"	Allen, Olzon	5:35
5.	"Lost Soul"	Allen	5:10
6.	"No Sign of Life"	Allen, Olzon	4:25
7.	"One More Chance"	Olzon	4:41
8.	"My Enemy"	Allen, Olzon	4:54
9.	"Who You Really Are"	Allen	4:42
10.	"Cold Inside"	Olzon	5:40
11.	"Who's Gonna Stop Me Now"	Allen, Olzon	5:52
Total length:			56:01

== Personnel ==
- Russell Allen - lead and backing vocals
- Anette Olzon - lead and backing vocals
- Magnus Karlsson - guitars, bass guitar, keyboards
- Anders Köllerfors - drums
