= Live in America =

Live in America may refer to:

- Live in America (Little River Band album), 1980
- Live in America (Kitarō album), 1991
- Live in América, a 1993 album by Paco de Lucía
- Live in America (Neil Diamond album), 1995
- Live in America (Transatlantic album), 2001
- Live in America (Victor Wooten album), 2001
- Live in America (Jorn album), 2007
- Live in America (Split Enz album), 2007
