= Roland AX-7 =

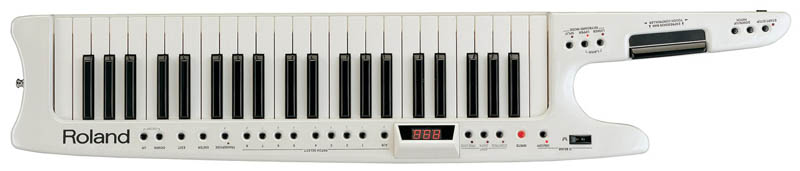
An AX-7

Herbie Hancock performing with a Roland AX-7 at the XM Sonic Stage at The Bonnaroo Music & Arts Festival

The Roland AX-7 is a keytar that was manufactured by Roland Corporation from 2001 to 2007. This modern instrument contains many more advanced features than early keytars such as its predecessor, the Roland AX-1, and the Yamaha SHS-10. It runs on 8 AA batteries or an external power source. It has a 45 velocity sensitive keys (without aftertouch), and a 3-character LED display. Several features aimed towards stage performance are present, such as a pitch bend ribbon, touchpad-like expression bar, sustain switch, and volume control knob, all on the upper neck of the instrument. There is also a proprietary "D-Beam" interface, made up of infrared sensors that detect nearby motion.

In 2007 the Roland AX-7 was discontinued and is succeeded by the Roland AX-Synth since 2009.

== MIDI functionality ==
This instrument functions as a MIDI controller; it produces MIDI messages that are sent to an external synthesizer or sound module. (Thus it produces no sound on its own.) It is fully compatible with General MIDI, General MIDI Level 2, and Roland's own GS MIDI implementation. It has both MIDI in and out ports, and can store up to 128 patches.

== Popular opinion ==
The overall opinion of the Roland AX-7 is consistent. Several reviewers have said that the AX-7 excels in features, like the D-beam and volume knob. It also has good scores in reliability and sounds, even though it has no voices of its own programmed onto the keytar. However, some said that it lacks in ease of use and customer support. Some said that the user's manual is too confusing for more lighthearted synth users, and the customer support knows almost nothing about the product. Nearly every review on one site agrees with that, but the overall review, out of 10, is a 9.2. On another site the users all agree that it is a valuable keytar; they all gave it 4-5 out of 5 stars and thought that the AX-7 was an excellent keytar.

== Notable players ==
- Tim Blake of the space rock band Hawkwind
- Herbie Hancock
- Vadim Pruzhanov of the power metal band DragonForce.
- Henrik Klingenberg of the power metal band Sonata Arctica. (Also Roland AX-1 and AX-Synth)
- Victoria Asher of the band Cobra Starship.
- Christopher Bowes of the band Alestorm.
- Robert Lamm of the rock band Chicago (band).
- Donald Fagen of the rock band Steely Dan. He also won a Grammy Award.
- Adam Wakeman, a keytarist for Ozzy Osbourne
- Beresford Romeo, from Soul II Soul
- Chick Corea
- Chris Marion, from Little River Band
- Daisuke Asakura, a Japanese pop artist
- Andy Qunta, from Icehouse
- David Britton, founder of Weird Fantasy
- Pablo Lescano, founder, keytarist and singer of Damas Gratis
- Didier Marouani, a French composer
- En Esch, from KMFDM and Slick Idiot
- Simon Kvamm, from the Danish band Nephew
- A.R. Rahman, Indian composer and Academy Award winner for Slumdog Millionaire

== See also ==
- Roland AX-1
- Roland AX-Synth
