= Spirit Black =

Studio album by Jorn
- Released: 5 June 2009
- Recorded: 2008 at Jailhouse Studios, Denmark
- Genres: Heavy metal; hard rock
- Label: Frontiers
- Producer: Tommy Hansen

Jorn chronology
Lonely Are the Brave (2008)	Spirit Black (2009)	Dukebox (2009)

Spirit Black is the sixth studio album by Jørn Lande's solo project Jorn.

Lande describes the album as "a crossover between The Duke and Lonely Are the Brave". He says that "The musical style and direction is now more defined and less experimental". He also says that the fans "can expect a solid and defined record".

Dimitris Kontogeorgakos of Metal Temple Magazine rated the album a 7 out of 10, writing: "Jorn has raised my expectations so high that it is kind of difficult to meet them with this one."

== Track listing ==
No.	Title	Writer(s)	Length
1.	"Spirit Black"	Jørn Lande/Willy Bendiksen/Sid Ringsby/Jimmy Iversen	4:14
2.	"Below"	Lande/Iversen	4:35
3.	"Road of the Cross"	Lande/Bendiksen	5:28
4.	"The Last Revolution"	Lande/Bendiksen/Ringsby/Jon Berg/Iversen	3:40
5.	"City In Between" (Vagabond re-recording)	Lande/Tekrö/Paul Gelsomine	5:49
6.	"Rock and Roll Angel"	Lande/Bendiksen/Ringsby/Berg	4:46
7.	"Burn Your Flame"	Lande/J. Bogberg	2:42
8.	"World Gone Mad"	Lande/Bendiksen/Ringsby/Iversen	4:20
9.	"I Walk Alone" (Tarja Turunen cover)	Anders Wollbeck/Mattias Lindblom/Harry Sommerdahl	4:28

Japanese edition bonus track
No.	Title	Writer(s)	Length
10.	"Wild Blood"	Lande/Bendiksen	4:25

European edition & Limited edition bonus track
No.	Title	Writer(s)	Length
10.	"The Sun Goes Down" (Thin Lizzy cover)	Darren Wharton/Phil Lynott	6:28

== Personnel ==
- Jørn Lande - lead vocals
- Tore Moren - guitars
- Jimmy Iversen - guitars
- Sid Ringsby - bass
- Willy Bendiksen - drums

=== Additional personnel ===
- Igor Gianola - guitars on "City In between", "I Walk Alone" and "The Sun Goes Down"
- Espen Mjoen - bass on "City In between" and "The Sun Goes Down"
- Nic Angileri - bass on "I Walk Alone"
- Jon Berg - additional guitars on "Rock'n'Roll Angel"
- Tommy Hansen - keyboards

== Release history ==
Country	Date	Edition
Europe	5 June 2009	Limited digipak edition
United States	9 July 2009	
Japan	23 July 2009	
Sweden	21 January 2010	Exclusive collectors edition - Limited to only 250 copies
