= Roland AX-Edge =

Musical synthesizer

- Manufacturer: Roland
- Dates: 2018

Technical specifications
- Polyphony: 256 notes
- Synthesis type: Digital Frequency modulation
- Aftertouch expression: yes
- Velocity expression: yes
- Storage memory: USB Memory
- Effects: 79

Input/output
- Keyboard: 49
- External control: Bluetooth MIDI with app

The Roland AX-Edge is a keytar synthesizer, which was introduced and released by Roland Corporation in September 2018. Being an installment within Roland's keytar lineage, it is the successor to the Roland AX-Synth.

== Features ==
The keytar synthesizer introduces customizable edge blades (a silver Edge Blade for the black model and a gold Edge Blade for the white model), which is a distinction from other keytars. The USB memory function and Bluetooth, along with MIDI are included. The keyboard has 49 full-sized keys with velocity and aftertouch, with 256 notes of polyphony. Vocoder, Mic Input, and 500 preset tones are present - which can be switched seamlessly without unnatural sound cut off. However, the synthesizer does not have the D-Beam controller, which was added to Roland's preceding keytars.
