= Joe Atlan =

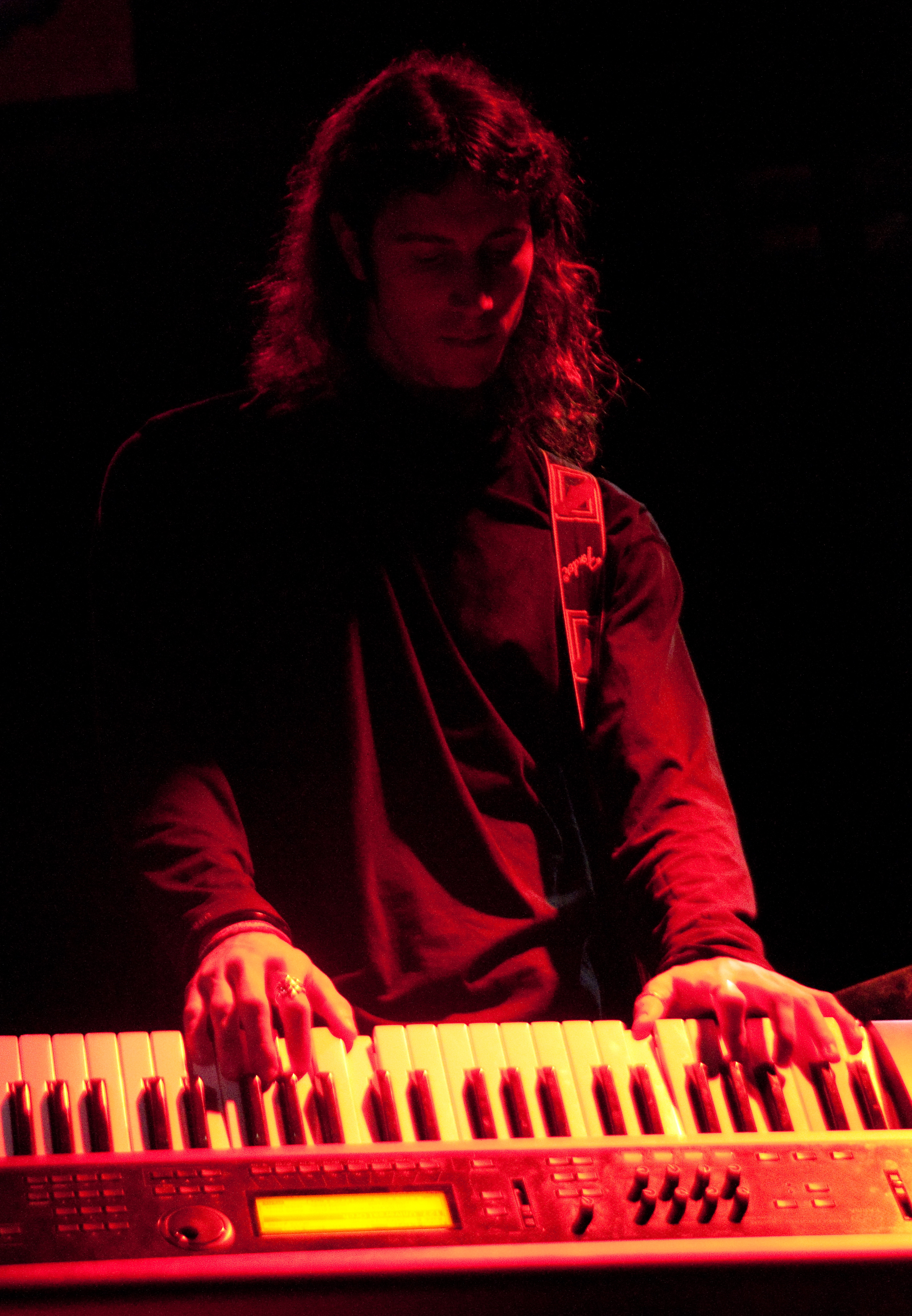
- Joe Atlan performing live in 2010.

Background information
- Born: Jose M. Aranda; July 23, 1989 (age 36); Málaga, Spain
- Genres: Piano rock, metal, acoustic rock, soundtrack, classical metal
- Occupations: Music, YouTube, Conferences
- Instruments: Piano, keyboard, keytar, vocals, guitar
- Years active: 2010–present
- Website: www.youtube.com/JoeAtlan

Joe Atlan (born July 23, 1989, in Málaga) is a Spanish keyboardist, composer, YouTube partner, and speaker. He has performed with several musicians such as Timo Tolkki and has shared the stage with other artists like Sungha Jung. Joe Atlan is also known for his academic writings and conferences about Music, Art, and Internet, including a TED talk. He has a YouTube channel where he frequently uploads videos and publishes his music for free.

== Biography ==
He first played a keyboard at the early age of 5, but he didn't go back to the music until he met the Italian power metal band Rhapsody. Atlan has said many times in interviews that he discovered the "true Art" with J. R. R. Tolkien and the "art in Music" for the first time with Rhapsody. Since that moment, when Joe Atlan was 16, he started to play and compose music on the piano.

In 2007, Atlan went to University of Navarra in Pamplona, where he studied Audiovisual Communication. During his studies at university, he showed interest for Film Scoring, and even though the degree was mostly about Cinema & TV production, he decided in his 2nd year that he would dedicate his life to Music. Atlan has composed the soundtrack of several short films and documentaries over the last few years, as well as the original music for a Spanish TV series.

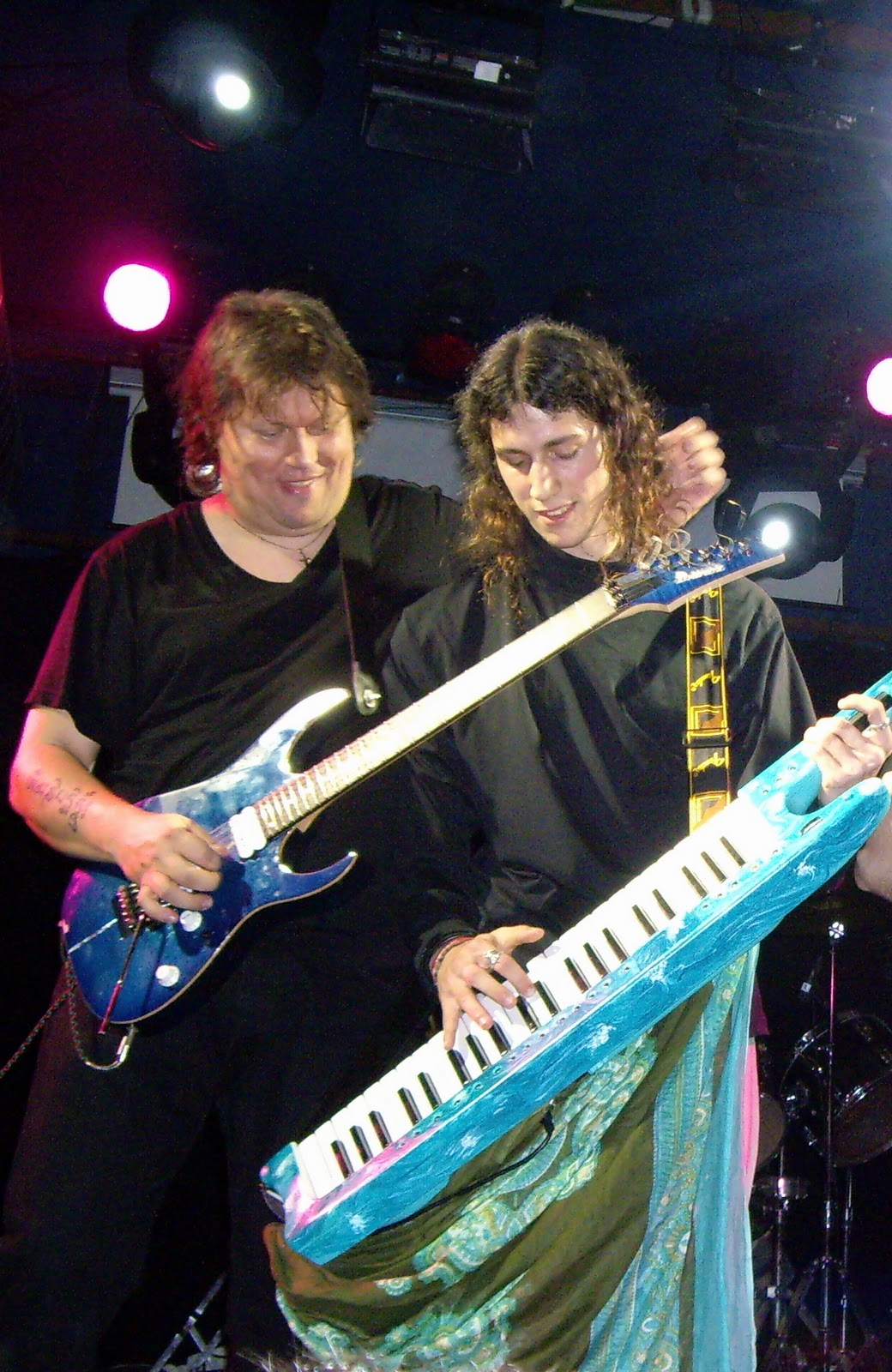
Tolkki & Atlan live 2010.

In November 2009, Joe Atlan was asked to play with the guitarist and Stratovarius found member Timo Tolkki in his Guitar Beyond Infinity Seminar Tour 2009–2010. The contact was done by Tolkki's manager. Atlan has mentioned Tolkki as one of his greatest musical influences many times, being this tour an "incredible honor" for him.

On September 16, 2012, Joe Atlan was one of the winners chosen to participate in Youfest, an international entertainment Festival starring famous YouTube stars from all over the world, such as Paul Potts, Rick Astley or Sungha Jung. Atlan was chosen from an arrangement he did with piano and keyboards of the Star Wars soundtrack on YouTube.

In October 2012, Joe Atlan was called to play in a national TV talent show similar to America's Got Talent but in Spain He performed Chopin's Fantaisie-Impromptu.

In 2016, Atlan performed at the opening ceremony for League of Legends All-Star Event in Palau St. Jordi, Barcelona.

== YouTube Channel ==
In October 2010, Joe Atlan started uploading his music to YouTube. In just a few days, one of his piano songs received more than 100,000 views. His videos are a display of musical experimentation, sometimes with a touch of humor, usually combining instruments and sounds with no particular Genre, or making original arrangements from movie soundtracks, such as The Hobbit, Star Wars, or Pirates of the Caribbean. Atlan tends to show virtuoso skills as an entertainment and way to practice, specially using his Roland AX-7 Keytar, which has become his signature instrument. He also shares his piano compositions there and publishes them for free. Joe Atlan's songs are usually instrumental piano tracks with an epic fantasy, oceanic and hopeful atmosphere. His work on YouTube is often featured in digital magazines and music-video websites.

== Equipment ==
- Roland AX-7 Keytar
- Kurzweil K2600X (88 keys)
- Korg Karma
- Casio Celviano AL-100R
- Roland JV-1080

== Personal life ==
Joe Atlan was born in Málaga, but he has always lived in Marbella, where he currently resides. He is the oldest of 6 brothers. Atlan has often said through his social media pages that he does Archery, Taekwondo and Volleyball in his free time.

== Discography ==
=== Singles ===
The following list consists of Joe Atlan's piano singles available at his YouTube Channel.

- "Sea Light" (2010)
- "A Breeze Away" (2011)
- "The Shoreline Pearl" (2011)
- "Dawn Drops" (2011)
- "Draw the Bright Side" (2011)
- "Healing Sands" (2012)
- "Seahorse's Little Wish" (2012)
- "Arisen Spirit" (2012)
- "Crystalline Voice" (2012)
- "Star Wars Medley" (2012)
- "Pirates of the Caribbean Medley" (2012)
- "River's Ending" (2012)
- "Facing the Storm with Optimism" (2012)
- "Song of the Lonely Mountains (from The Hobbit) (2012)"
- "Musical Poem: Lagrima" (2013)

== See also ==
- University of Navarra
- Dream Theater
- Timo Tolkki
- TED
- YouTube
- List of keytarists
