= Life on Death Road =

Studio album by Jorn
- Released: June 2, 2017 (International edition); June 21, 2017 (Japanese edition)
- Recorded: 2017
- Studio: Ivorytears Music Works, Somma Lombardo, Italy; Level 10 Music, Ostfildern, Germany; Guitar Dungeon Studio, Oxford, London, UK; Ocean Sound Recordings, Giske, Norway
- Genre: Hard rock; heavy metal
- Length: 67:02 (International edition); 71:36 (Japanese edition)
- Label: Frontiers Records (International edition); Avalon (Japanese edition)
- Producer: Alessandro Del Vecchio and Jørn Lande

Jorn chronology
| Heavy Rock Radio (2016) | Life on Death Road (2017) | 50 Years On Earth (The Anniversary Box Set) (2018) |

Life on Death Road is the ninth studio album by Jørn Lande's solo project Jorn.

The album was released on June 2, 2017. It features the debut of a new lineup with all the instrumentalists, at the time, from the band Voodoo Circle: Mat Sinner (also a member of Primal Fear, Sinner and Kiske/Somerville) on bass, Francesco Jovino (ex-Primal Fear, ex-Hardline, ex-Sunstorm) on drums, Alex Beyrodt (Primal Fear, Silent Force) on guitar and Alessandro Del Vecchio (Hardline, Sunstorm, Edge of Forever, Silent Force) on keyboards and production. Del Vecchio had previously worked with Jørn on the album of cover songs Heavy Rock Radio and this time did most of the songwriting on Life on Death Road.

The album also features guest appearances by guitarists Gus G and Craig Goldy.

== Track listing ==
| No. | Title | Writer(s) | Length |
|---|---|---|---|
| 1. | "Life On Death Road" | Jørn Lande, Alessandro Del Vecchio, Carmine Martone | 7:20 |
| 2. | "Hammered To The Cross (The Business)" | Lande, Del Vecchio | 5:29 |
| 3. | "Love Is The Remedy" | Lande, Del Vecchio, Simone Mularoni | 4:53 |
| 4. | "Dreamwalker" | Lande, Del Vecchio, Mularoni | 4:59 |
| 5. | "Fire To The Sun" | Lande, Alex Beyrodt | 5:05 |
| 6. | "Insoluble Maze (Dreams In The Blindness)" | Lande, Del Vecchio | 5:40 |
| 7. | "I Walked Away" | Lande, Del Vecchio, Mularoni | 5:05 |
| 8. | "The Slippery Slope (Hangman's Rope)" | Lande, Del Vecchio | 5:29 |
| 9. | "Devil You Can Drive" | Lande, Del Vecchio, Mularoni | 6:06 |
| 10. | "The Optimist" | Lande, Gus G | 4:52 |
| 11. | "Man Of The '80s" | Lande, Del Vecchio | 4:50 |
| 12. | "Blackbirds" | Lande, Del Vecchio | 6:14 |
| Total length: | | | 67:02 |

Japanese edition bonus track
| No. | Title | Writer(s) | Length |
|---|---|---|---|
| 13. | "The Optimist" (acoustic version) | Lande, Gus G | 4:34 |

== Personnel ==
=== Musicians ===
- Jørn Lande – vocals, producing
- Alex Beyrodt – guitars
- Mat Sinner – bass
- Francesco Jovino – drums
- Alessandro Del Vecchio – keyboards, producing, recording, mixing, mastering

Additional musicians

- Gus G – guitar solo on tracks 1 and 3, all guitars on track 10
- Craig Goldy – guitar solo on track 1

=== Additional personnel ===
- Lasse "Lazz" Jensen - additional musical arrangements, vocals engineering
