= The Revenge (album) =

Studio album by Allen/Lande
- Released: 11 May 2007
- Studios: Guitars, bass and keyboards recorded at Stuntguitar Studios in Höör. Jorn's vocals recorded at Mediamaker studio in Skien, Norway. Russel Allen vocals recorded and produced at Gear Studios and Centurion Studios Drums recorded at Reingold studio.
- Genres: Progressive metal; power metal
- Length: 63:33
- Label: Frontiers
- Producers: Magnus Karlsson, Serafino Perugino

Allen/Lande chronology
The Battle (2005)	The Revenge (2007)	The Showdown (2010)

The Revenge is the second album by hard rock supergroup Allen-Lande, a collaboration between vocalists Russell Allen and Jørn Lande, released on 2007. A follow-up to their first album The Battle, it features a more progressive power metal-oriented sound.

== Track listing ==
All tracks are written by Magnus Karlsson.

No.	Title	Lead vocals	Length
1.	"The Revenge"	Russell Allen, Jørn Lande	5:51
2.	"Obsessed"	Allen	4:47
3.	"Victory"	Allen, Lande	5:02
4.	"Master of Sorrow"	Lande	5:54
5.	"Will You Follow"	Allen	5:17
6.	"Just a Dream"	Allen, Lande	5:40
7.	"Her Spell"	Lande	4:47
8.	"Gone Too Far"	Allen	4:48
9.	"Wake Up Call"	Allen, Lande	4:47
10.	"Under the Waves"	Lande	5:32
11.	"Who Can You Trust"	Allen, Lande	4:55
12.	"When Time Doesn't Heal"	Allen, Lande	6:13
Total length:			59:22

Japanese edition bonus track
No.	Title	Lead vocals	Length
13.	"When Time Doesn't Heal" (acoustic version)	Allen, Lande	4:11

== Personnel ==
Musicians

- Russell Allen - lead and backing vocals
- Jørn Lande - lead and backing vocals
- Magnus Karlsson - guitars, bass guitar, keyboards
- Jaime Salazar - drums

Production

- Magnus Karlsson, Serafino Perugino - production
- Dennis Ward - mixing
- Rodney Matthews - cover art
