= The Showdown (album) =

Studio album by Allen-Lande
- Released: November 5, 2010
- Recorded: 2009–2010
- Genres: Hard rock; progressive metal
- Length: 61:38
- Label: Frontiers
- Producer: Magnus Karlsson

Allen-Lande chronology
The Revenge (2007)	The Showdown (2010)	The Great Divide (2014)

The Showdown is the third studio album by hard rock supergroup Allen-Lande, a collaboration between vocalists Russell Allen and Jørn Lande released on November 5, 2010. It is the third album in a row, and the last, to feature Magnus Karlsson as songwriter, producer and performer of most instruments, and Jaime Salazar on drums. Unlike on previous albums, Karlsson only wrote lyrics for a few songs, with most songs featuring lyrics by Tomas Erlandsson instead.

== Track listing ==
All lyrics are written by Tomas Erlandsson except when noted; all music is composed by Magnus Karlsson.

No.	Title	Lead vocals	Length
1.	"The Showdown" (Karlsson)	Russell Allen, Jørn Lande	6:04
2.	"Judgement Day"	Lande	5:59
3.	"Never Again"	Allen, Lande	4:58
4.	"Turn All Into Gold" (Karlsson)	Allen	4:01
5.	"Bloodlines"	Lande	5:06
6.	"Copernicus"	Allen	5:03
7.	"We Will Rise Again" (Karlsson)	Allen, Lande	5:53
8.	"The Guardian"	Allen, Lande	5:10
9.	"Maya"	Allen	4:24
10.	"The Artist"	Lande	5:10
11.	"Eternity"	Allen, Lande	5:35
12.	"Judgement Day" (videoclip)	Lande	5:24
Total length:			61:38

Limited edition bonus tracks
No.	Title	Lead vocals	Length
12.	"Alias" (Limited edition bonus track)	Allen, Lande	4:45

Japanese edition bonus tracks
No.	Title	Lead vocals	Length
12.	"Copernicus" (Japanese bonus track)	Allen	4:33

== Personnel ==
Musicians

- Russell Allen - lead and backing vocals
- Jørn Lande - lead and backing vocals
- Magnus Karlsson - guitars, bass guitar, keyboards
- Jaime Salazar - drums
- Jesper Gustafsson - piano on tracks 6, 9 & 11

Production

- Magnus Karlsson - production
- Achim Koehler - mixing and mastering
- Rodney Matthews - cover art
