= List of keytarists =

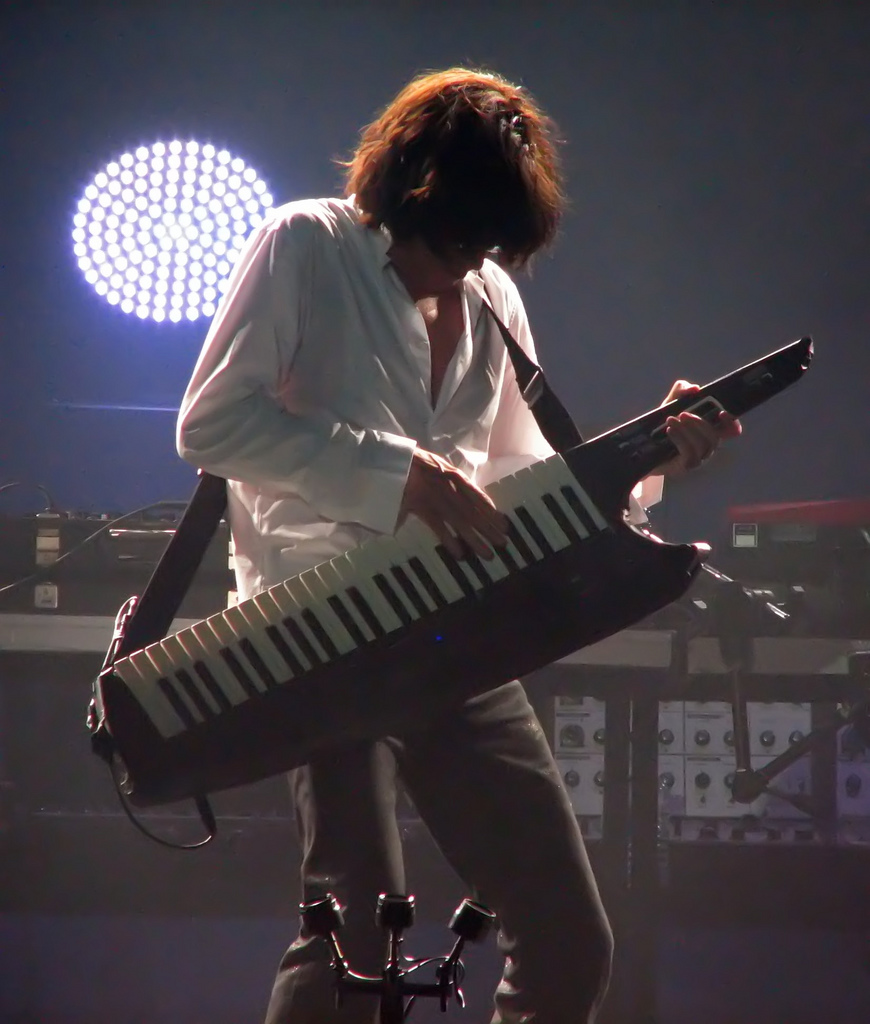
One of the best known keytarists, Jean Michel Jarre, playing an AX-Synth

The following is a list of keytarists. A keytarist is a musician that plays the keytar, a keyboard or synthesizer worn around the neck and shoulders, similar to a guitar. Only notable musicians who are widely noted for their use of the keytar as reported in reliable sources are included.

- Damon Albarn of Blur and Gorillaz
- Thomas Anders
- Daisuke Asakura
- Victoria Asher (Cobra Starship)
- Joe Atlan
- Yoko Kanno
- Matt Bellamy of Muse
- Christopher Bowes of Alestorm
- Bob Casale of DEVO
- Régine Chassagne of Arcade Fire
- Neil Cicierega
- Chick Corea (Chick Corea Elektric Band)
- Stephen Devassy
- Rittu P Fredy (First Female Keytarist of Asia . She is from Thiruvananthapuram, Kerala. She is also known as the Keytar Queen Of Asia and India)
- Thomas Dolby
- Brett Domino
- Dongmyeong of Onewe
- Geoff Downes of Asia and Yes
- George Duke
- Daniel Estrin
- Magne Furuholmen of A-HA
- Madonna Wayne Gacy
- David Garcia
- Lachlan Gillespie of The Wiggles
- Gregg Giuffria
- Jan Hammer
- Herbie Hancock
- Paul Hardcastle
- Imogen Heap
- Tonči Huljić
- Randy Jackson
- J-Break
- Jean Michel Jarre
- Howard Jones
- John Paul Jones of Led Zeppelin
- Tyler Joseph of Twenty One Pilots
- Keytar Bear
- Henrik Klingenberg of Sonata Arctica
- Holly Knight
- Tetsuya Komuro of TM Network.
- Simon Kvamm of the Dan Nephew
- Lady Gaga
- James Lascelles of Steve Harley and Cockney Rebel (though only on the riff of "Mr. Raffles (Man, It Was Mean)")
- Robert Lamm of Chicago
- John Lawry of Petra
- Pablo Lescano of Damas Gratis
- Indra Lesmana
- Lights
- Barış Manço
- Manfred Mann of Manfred Mann's Earth Band
- Sandy Marton
- Page McConnell of Phish
- Paul Meany of Mutemath
- Bridgit Mendler
- Prince
- Vadim Pruzhanov of DragonForce
- Jordan Rudess of Dream Theater
- Tom Schuman of Spyro Gyra
- Dave Stewart
- Mica Tenenbaum of Magdalena Bay
- Oliver Tree
- Eric Troyer of ELO Part II and The Orchestra
- Watch Out For Snakes
- will.i.am
- "Weird Al" Yankovic
- Edgar Winter
- Yenny of Wonder Girls
- Nomi Abadi
- ShellicusMax

== See also ==
- Lists of musicians
