= Bring Heavy Rock to the Land =

Bring Heavy Rock To The Land

Studio album by Jorn
- Released: June 1, 2012
- Recorded: 2011–2012
- Genre: Hard rock; heavy metal
- Label: Frontiers Records
- Producer: Jørn Lande

Jorn chronology
Live in Black (2011)	Bring Heavy Rock To The Land (2012)	Symphonic (2013)

Professional ratings
Review scores
Source	Rating
Allmusic	3.5/5 stars
Blistering	8/10 stars

Bring Heavy Rock to the Land is the seventh studio album by Jørn Lande's solo project Jorn.

== Release ==
The album was released on June 1, 2012, in Europe and June 5, 2012, in North America. The album's promise was to deliver another slab of classic hard rock with metal elements, as said by Jørn himself: "I think this album follows a similar JORN-tradition like those before, more Heavy Rock oriented than Metal" (...) "But as usual it's not one musical expression all the way through the album, but a variety of musical landscapes within the categories of Rock and Metal".

== Album ==
The album features two cover songs; Christopher Cross’ "Ride Like the Wind" and a new version of Masterplan's song "Time to be King" which is featured on Masterplan's 2010 album of the same name (which saw a brief return of Jørn Lande as their vocalist). This album is the last one to feature longtime guitarist Tore Moren and bassist Nic Angileri, as both announced their departure from the band after playing in a few concerts on the album's supporting tour.

== Title track ==
The title track "Bring Heavy Rock to the Land" was released as a single worldwide on May 14. A video clip for the song was directed by Thomas Tjäder (Pretty Maids, In Flames) who was also the director of Jorn's previous video clip for the track "Song for Ronnie James". The video was released on May 16, 2012, and features all members of JORN, except guitarist Jimmy Iversen. Another video clip was released for the bonus track "Live and Let Fly" with all members of JORN, except guitarist Tore Moren.

== Track list ==
1. "My Road" – 2:42 (Jorn Lande)
2. "Bring Heavy Rock to the Land" – 6:44 (Lande)
3. "A Thousand Cuts" – 8:03 (Lande, Tore Moren)
4. "Ride Like the Wind" – 4:48 (Christopher Cross cover)
5. "Chains Around You" – 5:06 (Lande, Moren)
6. "The World I See" – 6:08 (Lande, Moren)
7. "Time to be King" – 4:15 (Masterplan cover)
8. "Ride to the Guns" – 5:46 (Lande, Frank Knight)
9. "Black Morning" – 4:20 (Lande, Jimmy Iversen)
10. "I Came to Rock" – 5:13 (Lande, Iversen)
11. "Live and Let Fly" – 4:15 (Bonus track) (Lande, Iversen)
12. "Mob Rules" (Black Sabbath cover) (Japan bonus track)

== Personnel ==
- Jørn Lande – lead vocals
- Tore Moren – guitars
- Jimmy Iversen – guitars
- Nic Angileri – bass
- Willy Bendiksen – drums

Production

- Produced by Jørn Lande
- Mixing and mastering by Tommy Hansen
- Artwork by Felipe Machado Franco

== Release history ==
Country	Date
Europe	1 June 2012
United States	5 June 2012
