= The Devil's Hall of Fame =

Studio album by Beyond Twilight
- Released: 2001
- Genre: Progressive metal
- Length: 45:48
- Label: Massacre
- Producer: Finn Zierler & Tommy Hansen

Beyond Twilight chronology
Eye for an Eye (1994)	The Devil's Hall of Fame (2001)	Section X (2005)

Professional ratings
Review scores
Source	Rating
Kerrang!	3/5 stars
Rock Hard	9/10 stars
Lords Of Metal	10/10 stars
Sea Of Tranquility	5/5 stars
Vampster	5/5 stars
Metallus	9/10 stars
Rock Reviews	8.5/10 stars

The Devil's Hall of Fame is the first studio album by Danish progressive metal band Beyond Twilight. Released July 23, 2001. The album has many of the band's characteristic elements such as complex arrangements and dramatic dark multi-layers and was written mostly by the band's mastermind, Finn Zierler. The album showcases the elements which would become characteristic of Beyond Twilight's unique sound, namely a very atmospheric, heavy progressive sound. On release, the album was met with good reviews from fans and critics. It's their only album featuring Norwegian singer Jørn Lande.

== Track listing ==
No.	Title	Lyrics	Music	Length
1.	"Hellfire"	Finn Zierler & Jørn Lande	Finn Zierler	8:18
2.	"Godless and Wicked"	Finn Zierler & Jørn Lande	Finn Zierler	3:54
3.	"Shadowland"	Finn Zierler & Jørn Lande	Finn Zierler	5:33
4.	"The Devil's Waltz"	Instrumental	Finn Zierler	2:39
5.	"Crying"	Finn Zierler & Jørn Lande	Finn Zierler	7:19
6.	"The Devil's Hall of Fame"	Finn Zierler & Jørn Lande	Finn Zierler	8:26
7.	"Closing the Circle"	Finn Zierler	Finn Zierler	2:55
8.	"Perfect Dark"	Finn Zierler & Jørn Lande	Finn Zierler	6:44

== Personnel ==
=== Beyond Twilight ===
- Finn Zierler – keyboard
- Jørn Lande – lead vocals
- Anders Ericson Kragh – guitar
- Anders Devillian Lindgren – bass
- Tomas Fredén – drums, percussion

== Production ==
- Produced by Tommy Hansen & Beyond Twilight
- Co-produced by Hitworks & Beyond Twilight
- Mixed Tommy Hansen & Finn Zierler
- Recorded at Jailhouse Studios, Hitworks Studio, Zierler Studio
- Mixed at Jailhouse Studios
- All music composed and arranged by Finn Zierler
- All vocal melodies by Jørn Lande
- All choir arrangements by Finn Zierler & Jørn Lande
