= The Great Divide (Allen/Lande album) =

Studio album by Allen-Lande
- Released: October 17, 2014
- Recorded: 2013–2014
- Genre: Power metal
- Length: 54:38
- Label: Frontiers
- Producer: Timo Tolkki

Allen-Lande chronology
The Showdown (2010)	The Great Divide (2014)	Worlds Apart (as Allen/Olzon) (2020)

The Great Divide is the fourth and final studio album by hard rock supergroup Allen-Lande, a collaboration between vocalists Russell Allen and Jørn Lande, released on October 17, 2014. It features Timo Tolkki as composer, producer and performer of most instruments, and Jami Huovinen on drums, replacing Magnus Karlsson and Jaime Salazar from previous albums. Lande wrote most of the lyrics, marking his first involvement as a songwriter in Allen-Lande.

Professional ratings
Review scores
Source	Rating
Powermetal.de	7.50/10
Soundi	5/5 stars

== Track listing ==
All lyrics are written by Jørn Lande except when noted; all music is composed by Timo Tolkki.

No.	Title	Lead vocals	Length
1.	"Come and Dream with Me"	Russell Allen, Lande	4:34
2.	"Down from the Mountain"	Allen, Lande	4:06
3.	"In the Hands of Time" (Tolkki)	Allen	4:27
4.	"Solid Ground"	Lande	5:09
5.	"Lady of Winter"	Lande	4:54
6.	"Dream About Tomorrow"	Allen, Lande	5:11
7.	"Hymn for the Fallen"	Allen, Lande	5:30
8.	"The Great Divide"	Lande	6:26
9.	"Reaching for the Stars" (Tolkki)	Allen	5:24
10.	"Bittersweet" (Tolkki)	Allen	4:28
11.	"Bittersweet" (Tolkki; acoustic version; Japanese bonus track)	Allen	4:28
Total length:			54:08

== Personnel ==
Musicians

- Russell Allen - lead and backing vocals
- Jørn Lande - lead and backing vocals
- Timo Tolkki - guitars, bass guitar, keyboards
- Jami Huovinen - drums

Personnel

- Timo Tolkki - production
- Dennis Ward - mixing, mastering
