= Dracula - Swing of Death =

Studio album by Jørn Lande & Trond Holter
- Released: 23 January 2015 (Europe); 27 January 2015 (North America)
- Genre: Hard rock; heavy metal
- Length: 48:00
- Label: Frontiers Records
- Producer: Jørn Lande & Trond Holter

Dracula - Swing of Death is a rock opera concept album released by Norwegian musicians, singer Jørn Lande and guitarist Trond Holter. It is based on the storyline of Bram Stoker's Dracula.

The whole album was performed live on 1 May 2015 at the Karmoygeddon Festival in Norway, with all the musicians who played on the record.

== Track listing ==
All lyrics are written by Jørn Lande & Trond Holter; all music is composed by Trond Holter & Jørn Lande.

No.	Title	Length
1.	"Hands of Your God"	3:38
2.	"Walking On Water"	5:43
3.	"Swing of Death"	4:37
4.	"Masquerade Ball"	3:34
5.	"Save Me"	4:19
6.	"River Of Tears"	4:50
7.	"Queen of the Dead"	6:12
8.	"Into the Dark"	3:33
9.	"True Love Through Blood (Instrumental)"	3:57
10.	"Under The Gun"	5:10

Japanese Edition Bonus Track
No.	Title	Length
11.	"Hands of Your God (acoustic)"	3:01

== Personnel ==
- Jørn Lande – vocals
- Trond Holter – guitar, piano
- Bernt Jansen – bass
- Per Morten Bergseth – drums
- Lena Fløitmoen Børresen - vocals

Additional staff

- Cornelia Tihon - pan flute
- Catalin Popa - violin
- Solveig Mikkelsen Solhaug, Tommy Wærnes, Ingeborg Holter & Håkon Holter - backing vocals
- Stan-W Decker - artwork, layout
