= The Battle (Allen-Lande album) =

Studio album by Allen/Lande
- Released: September 19, 2005
- Recorded: Stunguitar Studios and RoastingHouse Studios, Malmö, Sweden
- Genre: Power metal; hard rock; progressive metal
- Length: 60:39
- Label: Frontiers, Locomotive, Avalon, Hellion, Over The Rainbow
- Producer: Anders Theander, Magnus Karlsson, Serafino Perugino

Allen/Lande chronology
The Battle (2005)	The Revenge (2007)

Professional ratings
Review scores
Source	Rating
Rock Eyez	5/5 stars
RevelationZ	9.5/10 stars

The Battle is the first studio album by hard rock supergroup Allen-Lande, a collaboration between vocalists Russell Allen and Jørn Lande. It was released on 19 September 2005, and is the first of three albums in a row to feature Magnus Karlsson as songwriter, producer and performer of most instruments, and Jaime Salazar on drums.

== Track listing ==
All tracks are written by Magnus Karlsson.

No.	Title	Lead vocals	Length
1.	"Another Battle"	Russell Allen, Jørn Lande	5:19
2.	"Hunter's Night"	Allen	5:38
3.	"Wish for a Miracle"	Allen, Lande	4:40
4.	"Reach a Little Longer"	Lande	5:26
5.	"Come Alive"	Allen, Lande	4:52
6.	"Truth About Our Time"	Allen, Lande	4:47
7.	"My Own Way Home"	Lande	4:46
8.	"Ask You Anyway"	Allen	5:10
9.	"Silent Rage"	Allen, Lande	4:24
10.	"Where Have the Angels Gone"	Lande	4:44
11.	"Universe of Light"	Allen	5:23
12.	"The Forgotten Ones"	Allen, Lande	5:24
Total length:			55:58

Japanese edition bonus track
No.	Title	Lead vocals	Length
13.	"Reach a Little Longer" (acoustic version)	Lande	4:41

== Personnel ==
Musicians

- Russell Allen - lead and backing vocals
- Jørn Lande - lead and backing vocals
- Magnus Karlsson - guitars, bass guitar, keyboards
- Jaime Salazar - drums

Production

- Anders Theander, Magnus Karlsson, Serafino Perugino - production
- Rodney Matthews - cover art
