= Starfire (Jorn album) =

Studio album by Jorn
- Released: 21 November 2000
- Genres: Hard rock; heavy metal
- Length: 47:53
- Label: Frontiers

Jorn chronology
Starfire (2000)	Worldchanger (2001)

Professional ratings
Review scores
Source	Rating
Allmusic	2.5/5 stars
Hard Rock Hideout	9/10 stars
ByrdTribute	(8.7/10)

Starfire is the first album by Jørn Lande's solo project Jorn. It was released on 21 November 2000.

It has mainly a melodic hard rock sound and several cover songs of his favorite bands. The album features members of his two then-current bands Ark and Millenium.

Lande said in interviews that the album is more of a demo thing than a full-length album with high production, which was much more improved on his next albums.

== Track listing ==
Music and lyrics written by Jørn Lande except where noted.

1. "Starfire" - 4:50
2. "Edge of the Blade" (Jonathan Cain, Steve Perry, Neal Schon) (Journey cover) - 4:21
3. "Break It Up" (Mick Jones) (Foreigner cover) - 4:16
4. "Forever Yours" (Jørn Lande, Jon Anders Narum) - 3:56
5. "The Day the Earth Caught Fire" (Lol Mason, Mike Slamer, Max Thomas) (City Boy cover) - 5:12
6. "Gate of Tears" - 5:05
7. "Burn" (Ritchie Blackmore, David Coverdale, Jon Lord, Ian Paice) (Deep Purple cover) - 6:13
8. "End Comes Easy" (Jørn Lande, Jon Anders Narum) - 4:08
9. "Just the Same" (Craig Chaquico, Jeannette Sears, Eric VanSoest) (Jefferson Starship cover) - 5:29
10. "Abyss of Evil" - 4:23

== Personnel ==
- Jørn Lande - lead vocals
- Tore Moren - guitar (on tracks 1, 6 & 10)
- Ralph Santolla - guitar (on track 2)
- Shane French - guitar (on track 3)
- Ronni Le Tekrø - guitar (on track 5)
- Tore Østby - guitar and bass guitar (on tracks 7 & 9)
- Sid Ringsby - bass guitar (on tracks 1–3, 5–6 & 10)
- John Macaluso - drums (on tracks 2–3, 5, 7 & 9)
- Willy Bendiksen - drums (on tracks 1, 6 & 10)
- Dag Stokke - keyboards (on all tracks, except 4 & 8)
- Jon A. Narum - guitar, bass guitar, drums, keyboards and samples (on tracks 4 & 8)
