= Allen (collaborative projects) =

Set of collaborative metal supergroups

Allen/___
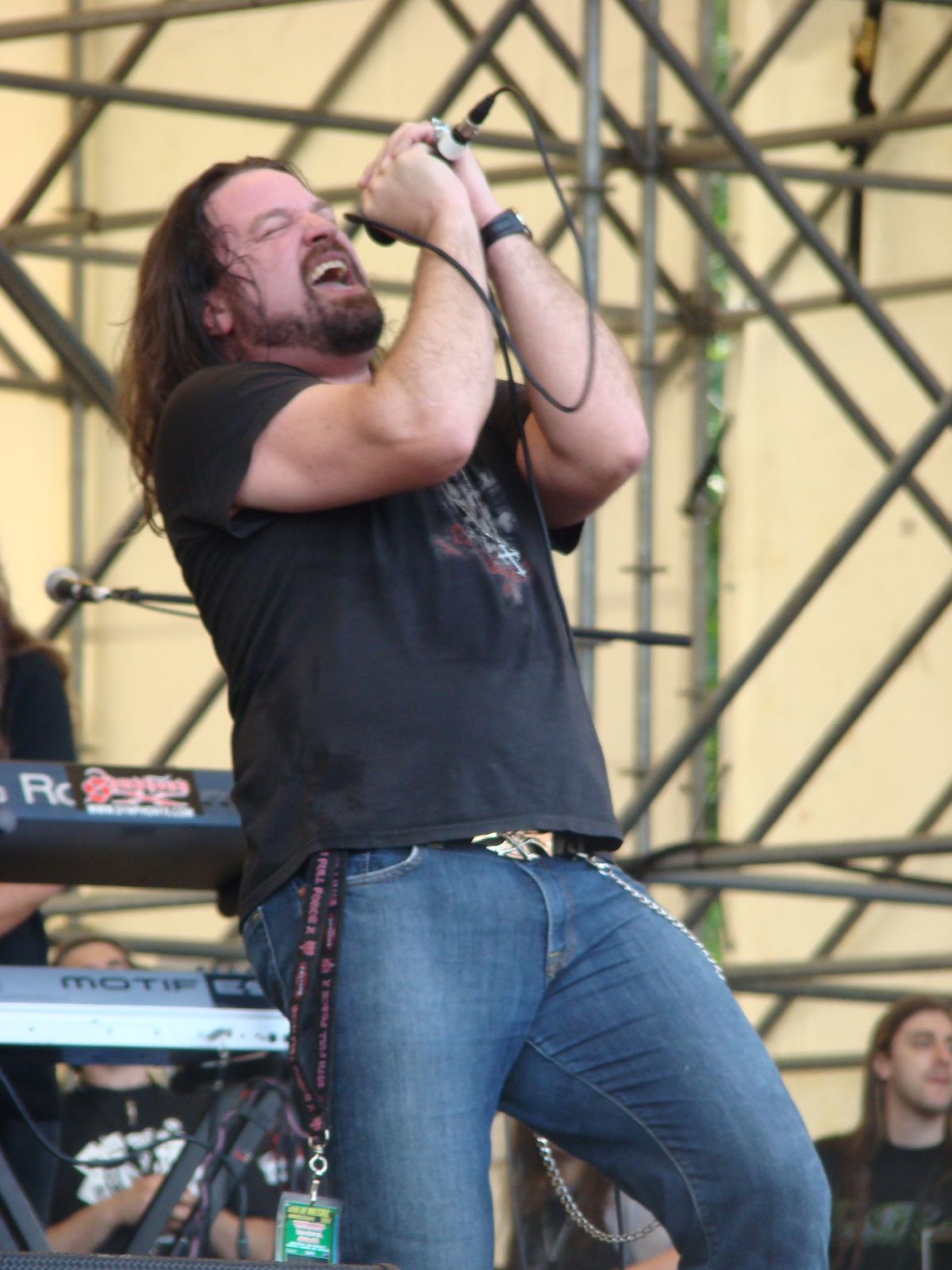
- Russell Allen

Background information
- Also known as: Allen/Lande (2005–2019); Allen/Olzon (2019–present)
- Origin: Italy
- Genres: Progressive metal; power metal; hard rock
- Years active: 2005–present
- Label: Frontiers
- Members: Russell Allen; Magnus Karlsson; Anette Olzon; Anders Köllerfors
- Past members: Jørn Lande; Jaime Salazar; Timo Tolkki; Jami Huovinen

Allen/___ is a set of collaborative metal supergroup projects by Symphony X vocalist Russell Allen.

The first collaboration, Allen/Lande was formed in 2005 by Italian record company Frontiers, though none of the members are Italian. It takes its name from Allen and its other singer former Masterplan vocalist Jørn Lande.

The project started with Swedish guitarist Magnus Karlsson (Primal Fear, Starbreaker, Last Tribe) as producer, main instrumentalist and songwriter. Together with drummer Jaime Salazar, the quatuor released three albums: The Battle (2005), The Revenge (2007), and The Showdown (2010). In 2013, Timo Tolkki (ex-Stratovarius) and Jami Huovinen replaced Karlsson and Salazar, leading to the album The Great Divide (2014).

In 2019, Lande announced that there would be no more Allen/Lande albums, citing his own lack of enthusiasm: "Originally there was never going to be more than one Allen/Lande album from my side, but since it got popular me and Russell agreed to do another one. After this I thought maybe maximum three since it was more of a side project. After The Great Divide which was done together with Timo Tolkki, I felt it was time to call it the day. I also noticed that there were several other releases coming out with similar style but with different singers, and so the whole thing started becoming a bit too fabricated to me." Allen went forward with another collaboration, Allen/Olzon, this time with former Nightwish singer Anette Olzon. Their first album together, Worlds Apart, was released on 6 March 2020. Their second album, Army of Dreamers, was released on 9 September 2022.

== Members ==
Current line-up

- (United States) Russell Allen — lead and backing vocals (2005–present)
- (Sweden) Magnus Karlsson — guitars, bass, keyboards (2005–2013, 2019–present)
- (Sweden) Anette Olzon — lead and backing vocals (2019–present)
- (Sweden) Anders Köllerfors — drums, percussion (2019–present)

Former members

- (Norway) Jørn Lande — lead and backing vocals (2005–2019)
- (Chile) Jaime Salazar — drums, percussion (2005–2013)
- (Finland) Timo Tolkki — guitars, bass, keyboards (2013–2019)
- (Finland) Jami Huovinen — drums, percussion (2013–2019)

== Discography ==
Allen/Lande

- The Battle (2005)
- The Revenge (2007)
- The Showdown (2010)
- The Great Divide (2014)

Allen/Olzon

- Worlds Apart (2020)
- Army of Dreamers (2022)
