= Roland keytars =

Keytars manufactured by the Roland Corporation

Herbie Hancock performing with a Roland AX-7 at the XM Sonic Stage at The Bonnaroo Music & Arts Festival

The Roland Corporation has manufactured several keytars.

== List of Roland keytars ==
=== AXIS ===
Roland's first keytar was the AXIS (officially the AXIS-1, leading to its frequently being confused with the AX-1). It was produced between 1985 and 1987, and is notable for being a significantly different design than later Roland keytars. It features a 45-note keyboard that is sensitive to both velocity and aftertouch; aftertouch sensitivity was removed on the AX-1 and not restored to any Roland keytar until the AX-Edge in 2018. It uses three conventional wheels for pitch bend, modulation, and volume, rather than the pitch ribbon and modulation pressure bar on later designs. It is AC-powered with no battery option – a proprietary multipin cable connects the AXIS to a Power Supply Unit on the floor. The PSU has non-slip rubber sides and features a power cable, power switch, multipin cable input, and MIDI output, as well as a footswitch for sustain while playing.

=== AX-1 ===
The Roland AX-1 was produced between 1992 and 1994. Like the AXIS, it does not produce sounds, but controls other devices (such as keyboards, sound modules and samplers) via MIDI. The industrial design of the Roland AX-1 was done in a basement studio in London, U.K. by two designers, David Sherriff and Andrew Leggo, who ran a small design studio called Space Logic. The electronic design and engineering was done by Roland Europe, Italy.

=== AX-7 ===
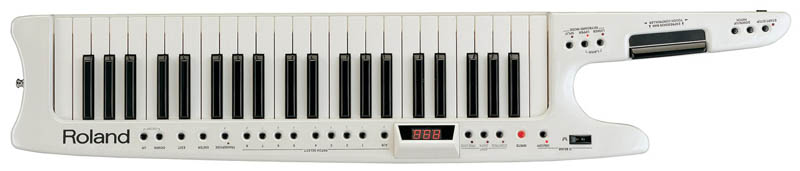
An AX-7

The Roland AX-7 was manufactured from 2001 to 2007. This modern instrument contains many more advanced features than early keytars such as its predecessor, the Roland AX-1, and the Yamaha SHS-10. It runs on 6 AA batteries or an external power source. It has 45 velocity sensitive keys (without aftertouch), and a 3-character LED display. Several features aimed towards stage performance are present, such as a pitch bend ribbon, touchpad-like expression bar, sustain switch, and volume control knob, all on the upper neck of the instrument. There is also a proprietary "D-Beam" interface, made up of infrared sensors that detect nearby motion.

In 2007 the Roland AX-7 was discontinued and was succeeded by the AX-Synth in 2009, followed by the AX-Edge in 2018.

==== MIDI functionality ====
This instrument functions as a MIDI controller; it produces MIDI messages that are sent to an external synthesizer or sound module. (Thus it produces no sound on its own.) It is fully compatible with General MIDI, General MIDI Level 2, and Roland's own GS MIDI implementation. It has both MIDI in and out ports, and can store up to 128 patches.

=== AX-Synth ===
The Roland AX-Synth was released in late August 2009. This modernized instrument builds on the features of its predecessor, the Roland AX-7. The most notable change is the addition of an internal synthesizer. A UV Black-colored "premium" model called "Black Sparkle" was released in September 2010. The AX-Synth has now been discontinued.

=== AX-09 Lucina ===
The Roland Lucina was released in March 2010.

=== AX-Edge ===
As of May 2019, Roland's latest keytar is the Roland AX-Edge released in September 2018. The model introduces customizable edge blades (these are cosmetic, not functional).
