= Song for Ronnie James =

Song by Jorn

from the album Dio
- Released: 2 July 2010
- Recorded: Early 2009; Jailhouse Studios, Denmark
- Length: 8:07
- Label: Frontiers
- Songwriter: Jørn Lande
- Producer: Tommy Hansen

"Song for Ronnie James" is a song by Norwegian heavy metal singer Jorn from the tribute album Dio. It was written as a tribute to the deceased Ronnie James Dio who died a couple of months earlier. The song is the only one on the album which is not a Dio / Black Sabbath / Rainbow cover. It has since been performed live many times.

The music video, together with the announcement of the tribute album, was released on the internet just five days after the news of Dio's death in May 2010, which caused some critique and speculation, as Lande was accused of exploiting the death of Dio. Later the record company explained that the album had been in the works since spring of 2009.
