= Dio (album) =

Studio album by Jorn
- Released: 2 July 2010 (Europe); 27 July 2010 (USA)
- Recorded: Early 2009; Jailhouse Studios, Denmark
- Genre: Heavy metal
- Label: Frontiers
- Producer: Tommy Hansen

Jorn chronology
Dukebox (2009)	Dio (2010)	Live in Black (2011)

Dio is a cover album by Jørn Lande's solo project Jorn, released in July 2010. The album was recorded as a tribute to the singer Ronnie James Dio and consists of covers of songs from Dio, Black Sabbath and Rainbow, with one original composition written for Ronnie James Dio. Lande describes the album as a "fine collection of songs that present the music of The Man and The Artist, with a unique twist" and a "sincere and heartfelt “thank you” to a great and influential Artist" who "has affected my life and career in such a way that without his presence, I would not have become the artist I am today". A music video for the song "Song for Ronnie James" was released on YouTube. The announcement of the album did not pass off without critique however, as Lande was accused of exploiting the death of Dio. Frontiers Records President released a statement in which he denies those accusations and explains that the album had been in the works since spring of 2009, before Dio's death in May 2010. In South America the album is called Song For Ronnie James.

== Track listing ==
#	Title	Time	Writer	Original album
1.	"Song for Ronnie James"	8:07	Lande	Original Song
2.	"Invisible"	5:23	Ronnie James Dio, Vinny Appice, Vivian Campbell	originally from Holy Diver
3.	"Shame on the Night"	5:21	Dio, Appice, Jimmy Bain, Campbell	originally from Holy Diver
4.	"Push"	3:59	Dio, Bain, Doug Aldrich	originally from Killing the Dragon
5.	"Stand Up and Shout"	3:22	Dio, Bain	originally from Holy Diver
6.	"Don't Talk to Strangers"	4:55	Dio	originally from Holy Diver
7.	"Lord of the Last Day"	4:50	Dio, Goldy	originally from Magica
8.	"Night People"	4:24	Dio, Goldy, Bain, Claude Schnell, Appice	originally from Dream Evil
9.	"Sacred Heart"	6:26	Dio, Campbell, Bain, Appice	originally from Sacred Heart
10.	"Sunset Superman"	4:55	Dio, Goldy, Bain, Schnell, Appice	originally from Dream Evil
11.	"Lonely Is the Word / Letters from Earth (2010 version)"	5:27	Dio, Tony Iommi, Bill Ward and Geezer Butler/Dio, Butler, Iommi	originally from Heaven and Hell / Dehumanizer
12.	"Kill the King"	4:03	Dio, Ritchie Blackmore, Cozy Powell	originally from Long Live Rock 'n' Roll
13.	"Egypt (The Chains Are On)" (Japanese Bonus Track)	6:46	Dio, Campbell, Bain, Appice	originally from The Last in Line
14.	"Straight Through the Heart (live)"	5:06	Dio, Bain	originally from Holy Diver

== Personnel ==
- Jørn Lande - lead vocals
- Tor Erik Myhre - guitars
- Igor Gianola - guitars
- Tore Moren - guitars
- Nic Angileri - bass
- Willy Bendiksen - drums, percussion
- Tommy Hansen - keyboards

== Charts ==
Chart (2010)	Peak position
Swedish Albums Chart	53

== Release history ==
Country	Date
Europe	2 July 2010
United States	27 July 2010
