= Beyond Twilight =

Progressive metal band from Denmark

- Also known as: Twilight (1992-1999)
- Origin: Horsens, Denmark
- Genres: Progressive metal
- Years active: 1992−2008 (on hold)
- Labels: (Europe) Massacre (United States) Nightmare
- Members: Jacob Hansen; Anders Ericson Kragh; Tomas Fredén; Anders Devillian Lindgren; Finn Zierler
- Past members: Kelly Sundown Carpenter; Jørn Lande; Björn Jansson
- Website: www.beyondtwilight.dk

Beyond Twilight is a progressive metal band from Denmark.

== History ==
The band was originally formed by Finn Zierler in 1992 under the name "Twilight". Twilight attracted international attention releasing the debut album Eye For An Eye selling 25,000 copies. Twilight released two albums, Eye For An Eye and "The Edge", and one single "Sail Away". In 1999 Finn Zierler decided pursue his own visions and founded Beyond Twilight carrying the almost identical logo and the symbol which is found on all Zierler's releases. Musically the style changed to dark progressive metal with symphonic elements and harmonic vocals.

Beyond Twilight have released three studio albums to date and one music video: The Devil's Hall of Fame on July 23, 2001, Section X on March 29, 2005 and For the Love of Art and the Making on April 21, 2006 under German label, Massacre Records.

In 2012, Finn Zierler re-surfaced with a new outfit, named Zierler Projects, later shorted to Zierler. The line-up was announced to include former Beyond Twilight vocalist Kelly Sundown Carpenter (Firewind, Darkology, Outworld) and Truls Haugen (Circus Maximus, Insense) on shared vocal duties, Per Nilsson (Scar Symmetry, Kaipa) on guitars/bass, and Bobby Jarzombek (Fates Warning, Halford, Spastic Ink) on drums. Although initially anticipated as a 2013 release, the band's debut album ESC did not surface until the fall of 2015.

== Band line-up ==
=== Current members ===
- Finn Zierler − keyboards (1992–present)
- Anders Ericson Kragh − lead guitar (1994–present)
- Anders Devillian Lindgren − bass (1994–present)
- Tomas Fredén − drums, percussion (1994–present)
- Jacob Hansen − rhythm guitar (2005–present)
- Björn Jansson − lead vocals (2006–present)

=== Former members ===
- Anders Engberg − lead vocals (1992–1999)
- Micke Därth − rhythm guitar (1992–2005)
- Jørn Lande − lead vocals (1999–2001)
- Kelly Sundown Carpenter − lead vocals (2004–2005)

== Discography ==
- The Edge (1992 demo, remastered and reissued in 1999 as a full-length album)
- Sail Away (1994, single)
- Eye for an Eye (1994)
- The Devil's Hall of Fame (2001)
- Section X (2005)
- For the Love of Art and the Making (2006)
