= The Duke (Jørn Lande album) =

Studio album by Jorn
- Released: 4 April 2006
- Studio: Mediamaker Studio
- Genre: Heavy metal; hard rock
- Length: 49:01
- Label: AFM/Candlelight
- Producer: Jørn Lande

Jorn chronology
Out to Every Nation (2004)	The Duke (2006)	The Gathering (2007)

Professional ratings
Review scores
Source	Rating
Allmusic	3.5/5 stars
RevelationZ	8/10 stars
Metaleater	9/10 stars

The Duke is the fourth studio album by Jørn Lande's solo project Jorn.

The album features Jørn Lande's collaboration with two guitarists Jørn Viggo Lofstad and Tore Moren for the first time together. The two had worked with Jorn before, although separately. While Moren played on Worldchanger, Lofstad played on Out to Every Nation. The album also features former TNT and Vagabond bassist Morty Black, and former The Snakes drummer Willy Bendiksen.

== Track listing ==
No.	Title	Writer(s)	Length
1.	"We Brought The Angels Down"	Jørn Lande, Jørn Viggo Lofstad	4:18
2.	"Blacksong"	Lande, Viggo Lofstad	5:36
3.	"Stormcrow"	Lande, Viggo Lofstad	3:44
4.	"End Of Time"	Lande, Viggo Lofstad	4:16
5.	"Duke Of Love"	Lande, Viggo Lofstad	4:35
6.	"Burning Chains"	Lande, Viggo Lofstad	3:41
7.	"After The Dying"	Lande, Viggo Lofstad	4:59
8.	"Midnight Madness"	Lande, Viggo Lofstad	4:21
9.	"Are You Ready" (Thin Lizzy Cover)	Brian Downey, Brian Robertson, Scott Gorham	3:06
10.	"Starfire (2006 Version)"	Lande	5:26
Total length:			44:02

Japanese Edition Bonus Track
No.	Title	Writer(s)	Length
11.	"Noose" (Ark Re-Recording)	Lande, John Macaluso, Tore Østby	4:59
Total length:			49:01

== Personnel ==
- Jørn Lande - lead vocals
- Jørn Viggo Lofstad - guitar
- Tore Moren - guitar
- Morty Black - bass
- Willy Bendiksen - drums
