= Jørn Lande =

Norwegian singer

- Jørn Lande at Spetakkelfestivalen in Larvik 2026

Background information
- Born: 31 May 1968 (age 58); Rjukan, Norway
- Genres: Heavy metal; hard rock; power metal; symphonic metal; progressive rock; blues rock
- Occupations: Singer, songwriter
- Years active: 1993–present
- Website: jornlande.com

Jørn Marumsrud Lande (born 31 May 1968) is a Norwegian hard rock and heavy metal singer. He is known for his work with the bands Ark, Beyond Twilight, Millenium, Vagabond, The Snakes, and, most notably, the power metal band Masterplan. He has been a recurrent guest vocalist with the international supergroup Avantasia, and has performed as a lead and guest singer in several projects. He also has a solo project Jorn which has released numerous albums. In 2014, Lande was hired by Riot Games to be the voice of the character Karthus, of the fictional heavy metal band Pentakill (League of Legends).

== Biography ==
=== Vagabond, the Snakes and first projects (1993–1998) ===
The first band with whom Jørn achieved minor success was Vagabond, which featured Ronni Le Tekrø, Morty Black and other former members of the Norwegian hard rock band TNT. Their self-titled debut album, released in 1994, sold 10,000 copies in Norway, but the band were dropped by label EMI. At this time, Jørn recorded the lead vocals for the Norway national football team's song for the 1994 World Cup, "Alt for Norge" (Everything for Norway). The second Vagabond album, A Huge Fan of Life, was released in Europe on the band's own record label. The end of Vagabond came with the reformation of TNT in 1996, and subsequently the band members went their separate ways, with Jørn joining a band formed in 1997 by former Whitesnake guitarists Bernie Marsden and Micky Moody called the Snakes. After a tour with the Snakes playing mostly Whitesnake covers and the recording of an album released only in Japan called Once Bitten, Jørn was fired from the band and joined other projects, including the Symphonic Metal band Mundanus Imperium, which resulted on the album The Spectral Spheres Coronation.

=== Ark, Millenium, Beyond Twilight, first solo albums (1999–2001) ===
Later on, Jørn got together with guitarist Tore Østby (Conception) and drummer John Macaluso to form the progressive metal band Ark and record their first self titled album in 1999. Right after in 2000, he also made part of the American hard rock band Millenium, led by guitarist Ralph Santolla, and recorded the vocals for their album Hourglass. The same year, John Macaluso from Ark, who was also playing with Yngwie Malmsteen's band, made contact with the guitarist to include Jørn on a mini tour in Europe, as they needed a vocalist for the band. The collaboration between Lande and Malmsteen didn't endure and Jørn left the band in the middle of the tour. Also in the same year, Jørn recorded his first solo album called Starfire, which featured mostly cover songs and several band members from his past and current bands as the musicians of the album.

The second Ark album Burn the Sun was released in 2001. Also in 2001, he teamed up with keyboardist Finn Zierler and formed the project Beyond Twilight which led to the album The Devil's Hall of Fame. Still in the same year, Jørn released his second solo album Worldchanger.

=== Masterplan, Allen/Lande and other projects (2002–2010) ===
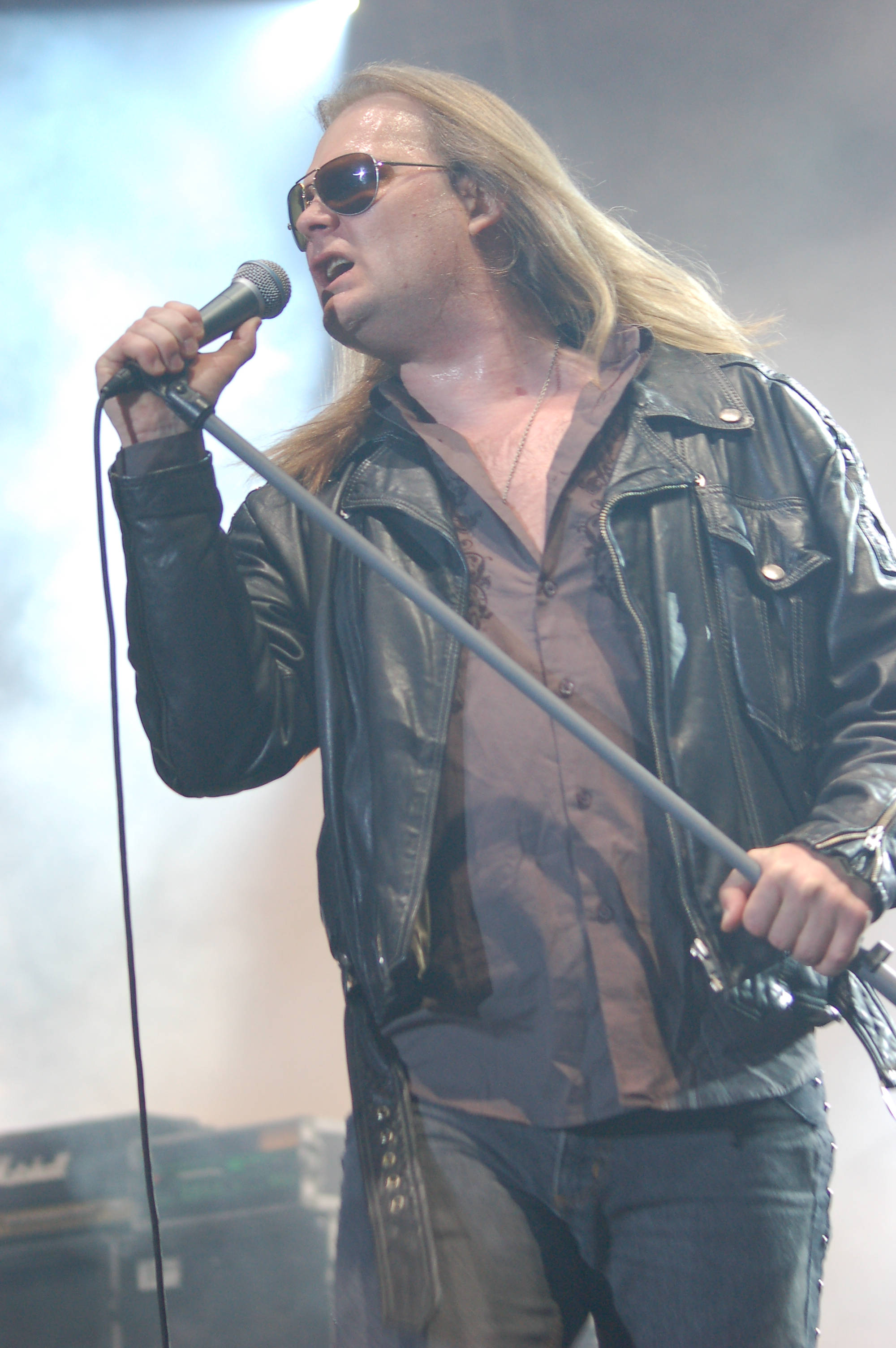
Lande performing at Metalmania 2007

In 2002, Jørn joined the melodic power metal band Masterplan, formed with Roland Grapow and Uli Kusch after both were fired from Helloween. Jørn released two successful albums with Masterplan, playing at big festivals and tours around the world from 2003 to 2006 until he left the band on 11 May 2006, because of creative differences. Jørn wanted to take the band towards a more melodic style, while the other members were leaning towards a heavier sound. During the time as member of Masterplan, Jorn also released two solo albums via the band's record label AFM Records: Out to Every Nation in 2004 and The Duke in 2006. After his departure from Masterplan, Jørn concentrated more on his solo career and started a longtime partnership with the record company Frontiers Records.

In 2005, Jørn teamed up with Symphony X vocalist Russell Allen in a singer-duet collaboration on the album The Battle, and their following album, The Revenge, released 11 May 2007. The project is commonly called Allen-Lande and was put together by the president of Frontiers Records, with songwriting duties and most of the instrumentation done by Swedish guitarist Magnus Karlsson.

Jorn's first live album, Live in America, was released 21 September 2007, containing two discs with tracks taken from his performance on 16 September 2006, at the rock festival ProgPower VII in Atlanta, Georgia.

In 2008, Jørn Lande lent his voice to the rock opera bands Ayreon on the album 01011001 and Avantasia on the album The Scarecrow, both released in January 2008. He was also one of the main guests in the first Avantasia's world tour. Later, he was featured on over 10 songs on Avantasia's two subsequent albums, The Wicked Symphony and Angel of Babylon and once again took part in the world tour in December 2010.

Jørn released two more full-length albums with his own band, Lonely Are the Brave in 2008 and Spirit Black, right one year after.

On 25 July 2009, Masterplan announced that Jørn was back in the band. Masterplan's 3rd album with Jørn Lande is titled Time to Be King and was released on 21 May 2010.

=== Dio tribute album, Heaven and Hell and Jorn establishment (2010–2013) ===
In late May, a Jorn music video honoring legendary heavy metal singer Ronnie James Dio, who had died of stomach cancer just five days before, was posted on YouTube. Soon after it was announced that Jørn would release a Dio tribute album in July. Later on, it was announced that Jørn was included in the line up of Heaven & Hell, when the remaining members played the one off tribute to Ronnie James Dio at the 2010 High Voltage festival. He was one of the vocalists together with Glenn Hughes.

The third Allen/Lande album titled The Showdown has been announced for release in September 2010. To promote the album, Frontiers Records released a videoclip of the song Judgement Day featuring Jørn singing, via YouTube.

In 2011, Jorn released his second live album with footage from the concert of the 2010 Sweden Rock Festival, the album was called Live in Black. Also in 2011, he was a guest on singer Amanda Somerville's first metal project Trillium singing on the vocal duet track 'Scream It'.

A new Jorn album called Bring Heavy Rock to the Land was released on 1 June 2012 in Europe and 5 June 2012 in North America via Frontiers Records. It has a single for the title track released on 14 May 2012.

In November 2012, the record company AFM Records announced the production of a new Masterplan album with a new line-up, including Rick Altzi (At Vance) replacing Jørn Lande as vocalist.

Jorn's first release for 2013 is called Symphonic, a compilation of previous recordings with classical music arrangement.

On 15 April 2013, it was also announced a new Jorn full-length album called Traveller, which was released in 11 June in North America and 14 June in Europe.

=== Allen/Lande reformed, Pentakill, Dracula, return to Avantasia and Tony Iommi (2013–present) ===
Jorn performing at Spetakkelfestivalen (Larvik, Norway), November 14, 2026.

Jørn Lande also announced in an interview that a new Allen/Lande album was in the works but this time with songwriting and production made by former Stratovarius guitarist Timo Tolkki, replacing Magnus Karlsson. On 24 July 2013, Timo Tolkki also confirmed the role in the project via his Facebook page. The album The Great Divide was released on 17 October in Europe and 21 October 2014 in North America. This time, Lande has also contributed with some vocal melodies and lyrics to the songs.

In 2014, Lande provided lead vocals for songs Lightbringer and Thornmail for the fictional League of Legends band, Pentakill (named after the rare occurrence of one player defeating all five of the enemy team in quick succession) taking the role of Karthus, a lich that serves as one of the playable characters in the game. The first single, Lightbringer, was released on 27 May, and the full album, Smite and Ignite, was released on 3 June 2014.

The same year, it was announced a project created by Lande together with guitarist Trond Holter (former Wig Wam), an album rock opera based telling the story of Bram Stoker's Dracula. It was released on 23 January in Europe and 27 January 2015 in North America and it's called Swing Of Death. They performed the whole album live on 1 May 2015 at the Karmoygeddon Festival in Norway.

In 2015, Jorn performed live with the fictional League of Legends band Pentakill in São Paulo, Brazil during the CBLOL (League of Legends Brazilian Championship) grand final. He was singing in a duet with the character Karthus (portrayed by Brazilian singer, former Hangar, Nando Fernandes).

The same year, it was announced that Jorn would be returning to Avantasia, recording vocals for the album Ghostlights and taking part in the 2016 world tour.

Jorn was also announced as one of the guests of former Allen/Lande instrumentalist/producer Magnus Karlsson's new album Kingdom of Rock, from his project Free Fall. Jorn sings the first and self-titled track.

In 2016, Jorn announced a new release called Heavy Rock Radio, his third album consisting only of covers songs from artists that inspired him to start a musical career. This time the album would include covers of pop artists such as Kate Bush, Frida, John Farnham and also some rock icons such as Paul Stanley, Queen, Iron Maiden, Journey, Eagles and many more. The album was released on 3 June 2016.

In 2017, a new full length Jorn album with original songs was announced. Called Life On Death Road, its release date is 2 June 2017 and features all musicians from the band Voodoo Circle, except the singer. The same year, he was also invited to sing most of the songs in the second Pentakill album Grasp of the Undying, released on 3 August 2017. He also performed live once again with the band in Brazil during the CBLOL (League of Legends Brazilian Championship) 2017 edition grand final, in the city of Belo Horizonte.

Jorn participated in Melodi Grand Prix 2021, the Norwegian preselection for the Eurovision Song Contest 2021, with the song "Faith Bloody Faith". The song did not qualify from Heat 1, however Jorn won the Second Chance round and advanced to the final as the wild card entry where he made the Gold Final before losing to KEiiNO and TIX.

On 11 April 2021, Jørn performed with Pentakill at LCS Mid-Season Showdown, debuting a new song from the band.

On July 2026, Tony Iommi (Black Sabbath, Heaven & Hell) released "World Alone" as the lead single for his album From the Dark, which was released on October 23, 2026. Jørn Lande is featured as vocalist and co-writer.

== Discography ==
=== Studio albums ===
Title	Details	Peak chart positions				
Title	Details	NOR	BEL (Wa)	GER	SWE	SWI
Starfire	Released: 21 November 2000; Label: Frontiers; Format: Digital download, CD	—	—	—	—	—
Worldchanger	Released: 20 June 2001; Label: Frontiers; Format: Digital download, CD	—	—	—	—	—
Out to Every Nation	Released: 11 May 2004; Label: AFM, The End; Format: Digital download, CD	—	—	—	—	—
The Duke	Released: 4 April 2006; Label: AFM, Candlelight; Format: Digital download, CD	—	—	—	—	—
Lonely Are the Brave	Released: 6 June 2008; Label: Frontiers; Format: Digital download, CD	28	—	—	42	—
Spirit Black	Released: 5 June 2009; Label: Frontiers; Format: Digital download, CD	21	—	—	52	—
Bring Heavy Rock to the Land	Released: 1 June 2012; Label: Frontiers; Format: Digital download, CD	27	126	—	34	—
Traveller	Released: 14 June 2013; Label: Frontiers; Format: Digital download, CD	12	118	—	37	—
Life on Death Road	Released: 2 June 2017; Label: Frontiers; Format: Digital download, CD	—	84	84	—	39
Over the Horizon Radar	Released: 17 June 2022; Label: Frontiers; Format: Digital download, CD	—	—	—	—	—
"—" denotes a recording that did not chart or was not released in that territory.

=== Live albums ===
Title	Details	Peak chart positions	
Title	Details	NOR	BEL (Wa)
Live in America	Released: 24 September 2007; Label: Frontiers; Format: Digital download, CD	—	—
Live in Black	Released: 27 August 2011; Label: Frontiers; Format: Digital download, CD	26	—
Live on Death Road	Released: 2019; Label: Frontiers; Format: Digital download, CD	—	194
"—" denotes a recording that did not chart or was not released in that territory.

=== Compilation albums ===
Title	Details	Peak chart positions	
Title	Details	NOR	BEL (Wa)
The Gathering	Released: 29 January 2007; Label: Frontiers; Format: Digital download, CD	—	—
Dukebox	Released: 28 August 2009; Label: AFM; Format: Digital download, CD	—	—
Symphonic	Released: 25 January 2013; Label: Frontiers; Format: Digital download, CD	23	196
50 Years On Earth (The Anniversary Box Set)	Released: 2018; Label: Frontiers; Format: Digital download, CD	—	—
"—" denotes a recording that did not chart or was not released in that territory.

=== Cover albums ===
Title	Details	Peak chart positions					
Title	Details	NOR	BEL (Vl)	BEL (Wa)	GER	SWE	SWI
Unlocking the Past	Released: 2007; Label: Avalon, Frontiers; Format: Digital download, CD	—	—	—	—	—	—
Dio	Released: 2 July 2010; Label: Frontiers; Format: Digital download, CD	37	—	—	—	53	—
Heavy Rock Radio	Released: 3 June 2016; Label: Frontiers; Format: Digital download, CD	23	184	135	92	53	38
Heavy Rock Radio II: Executing the Classics	Released: 2020; Label: Frontiers; Format: Digital download, CD	—	—	194	92	—	44
"—" denotes a recording that did not chart or was not released in that territory.

=== Singles ===
Title	Year	Album
"Bring Heavy Rock to the Land"	2012	Bring Heavy Rock to the Land
"Faith Bloody Faith"	2021	Over The Horizon Radar

=== As band member ===
Date	Band	Title	Type
1994	Vagabond	Vagabond	Studio
1995	Vagabond	A Huge Fan of Life	Studio
1998	The Snakes	Once Bitten	Studio
1998	The Snakes	Live in Europe	Live
1998	Mundanus Imperium	The Spectral Spheres Coronation	Studio
1999	Ark	Ark	Studio
2001	Ark	Burn the Sun	Studio
2000	Millenium	Hourglass	Studio
2004	Millenium	The Best Of... And More	Compilation
2001	Beyond Twilight	The Devil's Hall of Fame	Studio
2002	Masterplan	Enlighten Me	Single
2003	Masterplan	Masterplan	Studio
2004	Masterplan	Back for My Life	EP
2005	Masterplan	Aeronautics	Studio
2010	Masterplan	Far From the End of the World	EP
2010	Masterplan	Time to Be King	Studio
2005	Allen/Lande	The Battle	Studio
2007	Allen/Lande	The Revenge	Studio
2010	Allen/Lande	The Showdown	Studio
2014	Allen/Lande	The Great Divide	Studio
2015	Jørn Lande & Trond Holter	Dracula - Swing of Death	Studio
2026	Tony Iommi	From The Dark	Studio

== As guest vocalist ==
Embee (Mai Britt) Normann

- Wonderland (1993), backing vocals

Drillos

- Alt For Norge (single) (1994), Norway national football team's official song for 1994 FIFA World Cup 1994

Dag Kolsrud

- December II (1991), songs 'Someone To Love', 'Mary Tomorrow' & 'We Wish You A Merry Christmas'
- Got A Mind Set On Gold (single) (1996), song 'A Few Good Men'
- My First Choice (single) (1999)
- Famous (single) (2002), Norway team's official song for the 2002 Olympic Games in Salt Lake City, (English and Norwegian language versions)

Tor Talle

- Songs from the Heart (1999), songs 'Don't Turn Away' & 'After Love'

Nikolo Kotzev

- Nikolo Kotzev's Nostradamus (2001), as The Inquisitor

Norwegian Gospel Voices

- Let's Dance (2002), song 'Le Freak'

Brazen Abbot

- Guilty As Sin (2003), songs 'Eyes on the Horizon', 'Mr. Earthman', 'Bring the Colors Home' & 'A Whole Lotta Woman'

Diesel Dahl & Friends

- Happy Birthday Harley Davidson: Tribute To A Legend (2003), song 'Harley Davidson'

Re-Play

- Re-Pita Mania 2 (2003), song 'Love Don't Bother Me'

Thunderlords

- Fire In The Sky (single) (2005)

Bjørn Øyvind Bya & Jørn Lande

- Så Er Vi Her Igjen (Cupfinale Låta) (single) (2006)

Ken Hensley

- Blood on the Highway (2007)
- Blood on the Highway – The Exclusive Release Concert (live album) (2008)

Genius – A Rock Opera

- Episode 3: The Final Surprise (2007) as Apikor

Avantasia

- Lost in Space Part I (2007)
- Lost in Space Part II (2007)
- The Scarecrow (2008)
- The Wicked Symphony (2010)
- Angel of Babylon (2010)
- The Flying Opera (live album) (2011)
- Ghostlights (2016)
- Moonglow (2019)
- A Paranormal Evening with the Moonflower Society (2022)

Ayreon

- 01011001 (2008)

Olle Johnny Lande

- Tidssignal (2010)

Pushking

- The World As We Love It (2011), song 'Heroin'

Amanda Somerville's Trillium

- Alloy (2011), song 'Scream It'

David Lande

- Take The Wheel (single) – (2013), backing vocals

Pentakill – League of Legends

- Smite And Ignite (2014) as Karthus, songs 'Lightbringer' & 'Thornmail'
- Grasp of the Undying (2017) as Karthus, songs 'The Bloodthirster', 'Cull', 'Mortal Reminder', 'Dead Man's Plate' & 'Frozen Heart'
- Lost Chapter (2021) as Karthus, songs 'Lost Chapter', 'Edge of Night', 'Gathering Storm', 'Executioner's Calling', 'Last Stand', 'Redemption' & 'Lightbringer - Acoustic'

Magnus Karlsson's Free Fall

- Kingdom of Rock (2015), song 'Kingdom of Rock'

Oceans of Time

- Trust (2016), song 'Grapes of Baccus'

Martin Simson's Destroyer of Death

- Master of All (single) (2021)

== Solo band members ==
=== Band members/guests ===
Current lineup:

- Tore Moren – guitars (Worldchanger, The Duke, Unlocking the Past, The Gathering, Live in America, Lonely Are The Brave, Spirit Black, Dio, Live in Black, Bring Heavy Rock to the Land, Live on Death Road, Heavy Rock Radio II, Over The Horizon Radar, guest on Starfire, additional guitars on Heavy Rock Radio)
- Adrian SB - guitars (Over The Horizon Radar)
- Francesco Jovino – drums (Heavy Rock Radio, Life On Death Road, Live on Death Road, Heavy Rock Radio II, Over The Horizon Radar)
- Alessandro Del Vecchio – keyboards (Heavy Rock Radio, Life On Death Road, Live on Death Road, Heavy Rock Radio II, Over The Horizon Radar)
- Øyvind Strønen – bass (Live)

Former:

Guitars:

- Jørn Viggo Lofstad – guitars (Out to Every Nation, The Duke, Unlocking the Past, The Gathering, Live in America, Lonely Are The Brave, additional guitars on Heavy Rock Radio)
- Jimmy Iversen – guitars (Spirit Black, Bring Heavy Rock to the Land, Traveller, additional guitars on Heavy Rock Radio)
- Trond Holter – guitars (Traveller, Heavy Rock Radio)
- Tor Erik Myhre – guitars (Dio, Live in Black)
- Alex Beyrodt – guitars (Life On Death Road)
- Igor Gianola – guitars (Live, additional guitars on Spirit Black, Dio and Heavy Rock Radio II)
- Jon Berg – guitars (additional guitars on Spirit Black)
- Tore Østby – guitars (guest on Starfire, Unlocking the Past)
- Ralph Santolla – guitars (guest on Starfire, Unlocking the Past)
- Ronni Le Tekrø – guitars (guest on Starfire, Unlocking the Past)
- Gus G – guitars (guest on Life On Death Road)
- Craig Goldy – guitars (guest on Life On Death Road)

Bass:

- Sid Ringsby – bass (Worldchanger, Lonely Are The Brave, Spirit Black, Live on Death Road, Heavy Rock Radio II, additional bass on Heavy Rock Radio)
- Morty Black – bass (The Duke, The Gathering, Unlocking the Past)
- Nic Angileri – bass (Dio, Live in Black, Bring Heavy Rock to the Land, additional bass on Spirit Black and Heavy Rock Radio)
- Steinar Krokmo – bass (Live in America, guest on Unlocking the Past)
- Thomas Bekkevold – bass (Heavy Rock Radio)
- Magnus Rosén – bass (Out to Every Nation)
- Bernt Jansen – bass (Traveller)
- Mat Sinner – bass (Life On Death Road)
- Nik Mazzucconi – bass (Over The Horizon Radar)
- Espen Mjöen – bass (additional Bass on Lonely Are The Brave, Spirit Black and Traveller)

Drums:

- Willy Bendiksen – drums (The Duke, Unlocking the Past, The Gathering, Live in America, Lonely Are The Brave, Spirit Black, Dio, Live in Black, Bring Heavy Rock to the Land, Traveller, guest on Starfire, additional drums on Heavy Rock Radio)
- Stian Kristoffersen – drums (Out to Every Nation, guest on Live in America)
- Jan Axel von Blomberg – drums (Worldchanger)
- Beata Polak – drums (Live on Death Road)
- John Macaluso – drums (Starfire)
- Jon A . Narum – drums, samples, bass, guitars, melotrone (guest on Starfire)
- Christian Svendsen – drums (Live)

Keyboards:

- Dag Stokke – keyboards (Starfire)
- Ronny Tegner – keyboards (Out to Every Nation)
- Lasse Jensen – keyboards (additional keyboards on Heavy Rock Radio)
- Lasse Finbråten – keyboards (guest on Live in America)
