= Pitch wheel =

Control on a synthesizer to vary the pitch

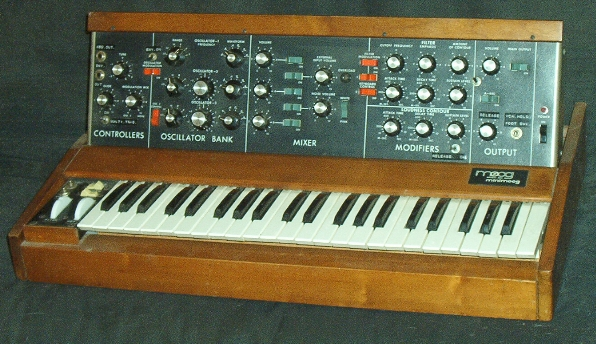
The Minimoog was the first synthesizer to feature a pitch wheel, visible at the left of the keyboard.

In electronic music, a pitch wheel, pitch bend or bender is a control on a synthesizer to vary the pitch in a continuously variable manner (portamento).

The first synthesizer with a pitch wheel was the Minimoog, in 1970.

Alternatively, pitch bend controllers on synthesizers may be implemented as a joystick, knob, or touch-sensitive ribbon.

MIDI represents pitch bend as a 14-bit integer, allowing for 16,384 possible values. General MIDI implementations default to a range of ±2 semitones.

== See also ==
- Glissando
