= Worldchanger =

Studio album by Jorn
- Released: 20 June 2001
- Genre: Hard rock; heavy metal
- Length: 42:25
- Label: Frontiers
- Producer: Jørn Lande, Tommy Hansen

Jorn chronology
Starfire (2000)	Worldchanger (2001)	Out to Every Nation (2004)

Worldchanger is the second album by Jørn Lande's solo project Jorn, released in 2001. It features a mix of tracks that represent different genres including hard rock, progressive rock, doom metal and power metal.

In a review for Metal Express Radio, Frode Johnsrud wrote that "Jorn’s voice is similar to sex – you just can’t get enough of it."

== Track listing ==
All songs written by Jørn Lande and Tore Moren except where noted.

1. "Tungur Knivur" (Lande) - 6:17
2. "Sunset Station" - 4:30
3. "Glow in the Dark" (Lande) - 4:38
4. "House of Cards" - 4:56
5. "Bless the Child" - 4:40
6. "Captured" - 4:08
7. "Worldchanger" - 4:51
8. "Christine" (Lande) - 2:53
9. "Bridges Will Burn" - 5:32

== Personnel ==
- Jørn Lande - lead vocals
- Tore Moren - guitar
- Sid Ringsby - bass
- Jan Axel "Hellhammer" Blomberg - drums
