= The Snakes =

British-Norwegian hard rock band (1997–1999)

- Origin: Norway
- Genres: Heavy metal, hard rock, blues rock
- Years active: 1997–1999
- Label: Pony Canyon
- Past members: Jørn Lande; John West; Bernie Marsden; Micky Moody; Neil Murray; Cozy Powell; Sid Ringsby; Willy Bendiksen

The Snakes were a hard rock band, formed by former Whitesnake members Bernie Marsden and Micky Moody in 1997. The line-up consisted of guitarists Marsden and Moody with Norwegian musicians, vocalist Jørn Lande, bassist Sid Ringsby, who later joined the Norwegian band TNT, and drummer Willy Bendiksen. The band released one live album, one studio album and broke up in 1999.

== Biography ==
The Snakes were formed by original Whitesnake guitarists Bernie Marsden and Micky Moody, exclusively performing Whitesnake songs. Initially, the project was called 'Saints and Sinners' and briefly featured other former Whitesnake bandmates, including bassist Neil Murray and drummer Cozy Powell and also American vocalist John West but this never materialised. In August 1998, the Once Bitten album was released in Japan on the Pony Canyon label. Former Vagabond vocalist Jørn Lande was hired and TNT guitarist Ronni Le Tekrø produced for the band. TNT's touring keyboardist Dag Stokke engineered the album. A live album Live in Europe was released in December 1998, with recordings of live performances of Whitesnake songs.

== Band members ==
- Jørn Lande – vocals
- Bernie Marsden – guitars
- Micky Moody – guitars
- Sid Ringsby – bass
- Willy Bendiksen – drums

== Discography ==
- Once Bitten... (1998)
- Live in Europe (1998)
