= Out to Every Nation =

Studio album by Jorn
- Released: 11 May 2004
- Genres: Hard rock; heavy metal
- Length: 46:24
- Labels: AFM/The End (International); Avalon Japan (Japan)
- Producer: Jørn Lande

Jorn chronology
Worldchanger (2001)	Out to Every Nation (2004)	The Duke (2006)

Professional ratings
Review scores
Source	Rating
Allmusic	3.5/5 stars

Out to Every Nation is the third album by Jørn Lande's solo project Jorn, released on 26 October 2004. The album features HammerFall bassist Magnus Rosén and Pagan's Mind guitarist Jørn Viggo Lofstad, drummer Stian Kristoffersen and keyboardist Ronny Tegner.

== Track listing ==
All songs written by Jørn Lande and Jørn Viggo Lofstad.

1. "Young Forever" - 4:54
2. "Out to Every Nation" - 4:23
3. "Something Real" - 5:40
4. "Living with Wolves" - 3:53
5. "Vision Eyes" - 4:11
6. "One Day We Will Put Out the Sun" - 6:25
7. "Behind the Clown" - 4:15
8. "Rock Spirit" - 4:36
9. "Through Day and Night" - 4:43
10. "When Angel Wings Were White" - 7:03
11. "Big" (Japanese & Russian edition bonus track)

=== Bonus Tracks on Limited Edition ===
1. "Young Forever" (Radio Edit) - 4:55
2. "Out to Every Nation" (Radio Edit) - 4:24
3. "Living with Wolves" (Radio Edit) - 3:58

== Personnel ==
- Jørn Lande - lead vocals
- Jørn Viggo Lofstad - guitar
- Magnus Rosén - bass
- Stian Kristoffersen - drums
- Ronny Tegner - keyboards

== Release history ==
Country	Date
United Kingdom	11 May 2004
Europe	26 October 2004
