= Sid Ringsby =

Norwegian bassist (born 1961)

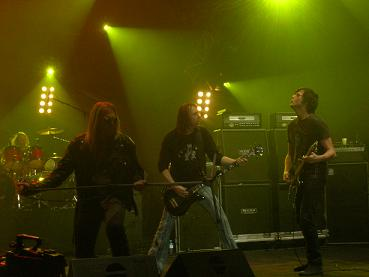
- Ringsby performing with JORN at Metalmania 2007 in Katowice, Poland

Background information
- Born: Øystein Ringsby; 16 February 1961 (age 65)
- Genres: Hard rock, glam metal
- Instrument: Bass guitar

Øystein "Sid" Ringsby (born 16 February 1961) is a Norwegian bassist best known for playing with Road, TinDrum, The Snakes, TNT, Ken Hensley, Wild Willy's Gang and JORN, Jørn Lande's solo band. His recording rock career started 1984 as he became a member of the band Road, and since then he has been in bands such as Tindrum, The Snakes, Diezel, Jorn, Vestlandsfanden, Ken Hensley & Live Fire and TNT. He is recognized as one of the most versatile bassplayers in the Norwegian Rock scene, with a lot of other recording artists to his credit

== Equipment ==
Sid mostly uses Stuart Spector basses, both NS-2 basses made in the US and NS-4 and Euro 4LX models made in the Czech Republic. He uses Ampeg SVT-CL heads and Ampeg Enclosures.

== Selected discography ==
=== TinDrum ===
- Drums of War (1988)
- How About This?! (1989)
- Cool, Calm & Collected (1991)

=== Diezel ===
- Willpower (1995)

=== Diesel Dahl & Friends ===
- reCYCLEd (1997)

=== The Snakes ===
- Once Bitten (1998)
- Live in Europe (1999)

=== Jørn Lande ===
- Starfire (2000)
- Worldchanger (2001)
- Lonely Are the Brave (2008)
- Spirit Black (2009)
- Live on Death Road (2019)
- Heavy Rock Radio 2 (2019)

=== TNT ===
- All the Way to the Sun (2005)
- Hidden Treasure(Single) (2013)
