= Starbreaker =

Starbreaker or starbreakers may refer to:

- Starbreaker (band), an American heavy metal/hard rock band
  - Starbreaker (album), their 2005 debut
- Starbreaker (character), a supervillain from DC Comics
- "Starbreaker", a song by Judas Priest, from the album Sin After Sin
