= Conception (band) =

Norwegian progressive metal band

- Origin: Raufoss, Norway
- Genre: Progressive power metal
- Years active: 1989–1997; 2005; 2018–present
- Labels: CSF; Noise
- Members: Tore Østby; Arve Heimdal; Ingar Amlien; Roy Khan
- Past members: See former members
- Website: conceptionmusic.com

Conception is a Norwegian progressive power metal band from Raufoss, active from 1989 to 1997, during which time they released four studio albums. The band reunited in 2018, twenty years after disbanding, and has since released one studio album and an EP.

== History ==
=== 1989–1997: Original years ===
The band began when guitarist Tore Østby joined three local musicians who played covers of metal bands. Østby started writing original material. Around that time, the band acquired singer Dag Østby and named themselves "Redrum". The band was active for a few months before the three local members left. Tore Østby and Dag Østby recruited drummer Werner Skogli and bassist Freddy Samsonstuen. Tore Østby chose the name "Conception". Their first rehearsal was on 5 November 1989. The band continued to practice and refine their sound.

The following year, the band hired engineer Nils Harald Mæhlum to record their first, thrash metal-influenced demo. After recording the demo, Skogli left the band. Nils Harald Mæhlum suggested Arve Heimdal, who became the band's drummer. After recording a second demo with the same producer, Samsonstuen left the band, and bassist Ingar Amlien replaced him. The band continued rehearsing, occasionally performing for small audiences in Dag Østby's garden. The band performed publicly for the first time on 22 December 1990 at the Sentrum Kino in Dokka, as part of the local festival "MEGAROCK", which resulted in more shows for the band.

Following successful performances, the band prepared to record a single to release. Tore Østby experimented with other types of music, which altered the band's direction toward a melodic, progressive style that required a different singer. Dag Østby quit, and the band began auditioning new singers, settling on Roy Khan, a classically trained opera singer from Elverum. The band had already recorded plenty of material for their first album, The Last Sunset. Following rehearsals, the band finished the album's vocals and the title track. Hans Christian Gjestvang was hired by the band to record the keyboards. When the album was finished, they established their own independent record label "Conception Self-Financed".

Following its 1991 release, the title track entered at number three on the Norsktoppen charts in 1992 for three weeks. The album received praise from European reviewers. In 1992, the band recorded the song "Black on Black" for a compilation CD of Norwegian metal. The band signed to Noise Records in 1993, where they recorded their second album, Parallel Minds, released that year. The following year, Noise reissued their debut album. In 1995, the band released their third album, In Your Multitude, and their fourth album, Flow, in 1997.

The band was characterized by a unique sound in the power/progressive metal genre, notable for Østby's occasional integration of elements of flamenco (which he would continue in his later work with Ark) and Khan's unique, operatic vocals.

=== 1997–2005: Breakup and reunion ===
Conception disbanded in 1997, and after that Roy Khan was invited to join American symphonic power metal band Kamelot as their new lead singer. He went on to release several albums with the band, before departing in 2010 due to health issues, and retiring from music indefinitely. Østby devoted his focus to Ark, a progressive metal band he had formed in 1999 along with Jørn Lande and John Macaluso. They disbanded in 2002 and reunited from 2009 to 2011. Ingar Amlien formed the death metal band Crest of Darkness, who have released six studio albums as of 2018, and remain active. Drummer Arve Heimdal retired from music in 1999, making a one-off return for the band's 2005 reunion.

Conception reunited in 2005, playing the important American progressive metal festival ProgPower USA on 16 September and Norwegian Scream Magazines 15 Years & 100 Issues Festival on 1 October, bringing the final five-man line-up together again.

=== 2018–present: Return to music ===
In April 2018, rumours began circulating that the band were planning a comeback, after reports of rehearsals in Gjøvik, followed by fan photos of the band together. Just a few days earlier, lead singer Roy Khan had posted a new track to his personal YouTube channel, his first known recording since 2010. This track, however, had no connection to Conception.

On 30 April 2018, the band officially confirmed their reunion, and announced the recording of an EP titled My Dark Symphony which was released on 23 November 2018. The reunion included the classic four-piece line-up, with Heimdal and Khan both coming out of retirement. Following the release of the EP, the band performed two reunion shows in Gjøvik, Norway in late April, before setting out to perform at three European festivals over the summer of 2019.

On 20 February 2020, the band announced their fifth studio album State of Deception, which was released on 3 April 2020. The first single off of the album, "Waywardly Broken" was released on 6 March 2020, along with an accompanied lyric video. The band released a music video for their song "No Rewind" on 22 May 2021. On June 6, 2021, the band announced that they would be releasing an expanded edition of State of Deception in 2022, featuring live tracks, re-recordings and new songs. They also announced the release of the single, "Cry", which was recorded live. On February 5, 2022, Conception released "Monument in Time", a song which was featured on the deluxe edition of State of Deception.

The band had announced on 1 July 2019 that they would be embarking upon their first European headline tour in twenty-three years in April of the same year the new album was released. Due to the COVID-19 pandemic, the band had postponed the tour into 2022. On 9 September 2022, the band reissued their first four albums.

On 1 July 2025, Khan had stated in an interview that the band had written a few songs for the next album.

== Band members ==
Current

- Tore Østby – guitars (1989–1998, 2005, 2018–present), keyboards (1989–1992, 1995–1996, 2018–present), lead vocals (1990–1991)
- Ingar Amlien – bass (1990–1998, 2005, 2018–present)
- Arve Heimdal – drums (1990–1998, 2005, 2018–present)
- Roy Khan – lead vocals (1991–1998, 2005, 2018–present)

Live

- Lars Christian Narum – keyboards (1996)
- Lars Andre Kvistum – keyboards (2019–present)
- Aurora Amalie Heimdal – backing vocals (2019–present)

Former

- Freddy Samsonstuen – bass, keyboards (1989–1990)
- Werner Skogli – drums (1989–1990)
- Dag Østby – lead vocals (1989–1991)
- Hans Christian Gjestvang – keyboards (1992–1994)
- Halvor Holter – keyboards (1994)
- Trond Nagell-Dahl – keyboards (1994–1995, 1996–1998, 2005)

== Discography ==
Studio albums

- The Last Sunset (1991)
- Parallel Minds (1993)
- In Your Multitude (1995)
- Flow (1997)
- State of Deception (2020)
