= Ark (Norwegian band) =

Progressive metal band from Norway

ARK
- Origin: Toten, Norway
- Genres: Progressive metal, progressive rock
- Years active: 1999–2002, 2009–2011
- Labels: Laser's Edge/Sensory Records, Favored Nations, Inside Out
- Spinoff of: Conception, TNT
- Past members: Jørn Lande; Tore Østby; John Macaluso; Randy Coven; Mats Olausson
- Website: myspace.com/arkburnthesun

ARK was a progressive metal band from Norway founded by guitarist Tore Østby (Conception, D. C. Cooper, Frankie's Playground, Redrum) and drummer John Macaluso (TNT, Riot, Spread Eagle, Alex Masi, Yngwie Malmsteen, Powermad), who later joined up with singer Jørn Lande to record two albums. Lande, Østby and Macaluso were joined by Randy Coven (Steve Vai, Steve Morse) on bass and Mats Olausson (Yngwie Malmsteen) on keyboards for their second effort.

== History ==
Ark's self-titled debut album was released in 1999. After touring to support the follow-up album Burn the Sun, ARK went on hiatus and eventually broke up, with Jørn Lande joining Roland Grapow and Uli Kusch in the classic power metal band Masterplan, as well as pushing his own solo career.

=== Reunion and disbandment ===
John Macaluso updated his discography to include a new ARK album, called Aradiokaos. Very little has been heard thus far, but when the news broke on Metal Storm, screenshots confirming the project were posted. All original members other than Jorn will be on the new album, but his successor has yet to be revealed.

Macaluso has stated several times on his personal Facebook profile that ARK was working with the new album and a new line-up. But his last post concerning the subject has put an end on the band's history, with his confirmation of the cancellation of the production and the beginning of a new band. The band officially disbanded in 2011.

On 20 May 2014 bassist Randy Coven's death was announced and keyboard player Mats Olausson's death was announced a year later.

== Members ==
- Jørn Lande – vocals (1999–2002), keyboards (1990–2000)
- Tore Østby – guitar (1999–2002, 2009–2011), bass (1990–2000)
- John Macaluso − drums (1999–2002, 2009–2011), vocals (2009–2011)
- Randy Coven − bass (2000–2002, 2009–2011; died 2014)
- Mats Olausson − keyboards (2000–2002, 2009–2011; died 2015)

Additional musicians

- Ingar Amlien – bass
- Trond Nagell-Dahl – keyboards

== Discography ==
- Ark (1999)
- Burn the Sun (2001)
