= Cinematic (EP) =

EP by Tony Harnell
- Released: September 23, 2008
- Recorded: 2006–2007 in Sweden
- Genre: Hard rock
- Length: 27:12
- Label: Dovetone Music
- Producer: Mats Valentin Lizette von Panajott

Tony Harnell chronology
Cinematic (2008)	Round Trip (2010)

Cinematic is the first demo EP by former TNT and current Starbreaker singer Tony Harnell, released on September 23, 2008, for free on his official website, and later through Dovetone Music. It is Harnell's debut release as a solo artist. The EP featured 6 demo songs that might be re-recorded for his full-length solo album, due for release in 2010.

The album was produced by Mats Valentin who also recorded all of the instruments. Additional vocals were recorded by Swedish singer Aleena Gibson.

Demos of "Out from Under the Black Cloud", "The Show" and "Cinematic" were released in Christmas 2007, on Harnell's Myspace page. Those demos were produced by Lizette von Panajott and orchestrated by Glen Gabriel.

== Track listing ==
1. "Out from Under the Black Cloud" - 5:06
2. "The Show" - 3:58
3. "I Don't Want Anything" - 3:59
4. "Cinematic" - 4:34
5. "One Way Ride" - 4:39
6. "Unholy" - 4:53

== Personnel ==
- Tony Harnell – lead vocals
- Mats Valentin – production, guitars, bass, keyboards, drums, percussion
- Stefan Altzar - guitars, co-writer
- Aleena Gibson – co-writer
- Lizette Von Panajott - producer, singer
- Glen Gabriel - Orchestrator
- Tomas Johansson - bass
