= Round trip =

A round trip (American English), or return or return travel (indian English) or (British English), means travel to the destination and back again.

Round trip may refer to:

== Arts and entertainment ==
=== Film ===
- Roundtrip (film), a 2004 comedy film
- Andata e ritorno, a 1985 documentary film

=== Music ===
- Round Trip (Phil Woods album), 1969
- Round Trip (Ralph Moore album), 1987
- Round Trip (Sadao Watanabe album), 1974
- Round Trip (The Gap Band album), 1989
- Round Trip (The Knack album), 1981
- Round Trip (Tony Harnell album), 2010
- Roundtrip, a 2007 album by Kirk Whalum

== Other uses ==
- Round-tripping (finance), a type of financial transaction
- Round-tripping (computer science) refers to converting data between formats and back, ensuring no data loss or change
