= Love's Dying Wish =

Studio album by Starbreaker
- Released: August 1, 2008
- Recorded: 2007–2008
- Genres: Heavy metal Hard rock
- Length: 52:21
- Label: Frontiers
- Producers: Tony Harnell, Magnus Karlsson

Starbreaker chronology
Starbreaker (2005)	Love's Dying Wish (2008)

Love's Dying Wish is the second full-length studio album by Tony Harnell led heavy metal band Starbreaker, released on August 1, 2008. It is the follow-up to their self-titled debut album from 2005.

The line-up on this album is the same except Jonni Lightfoot who replaced Fabrizio Grossi on bass. Tony Harnell has stated in an interview that "the album is a lot more aggressive than the first one".

Grigoris Chronis of Metal Temple Magazine rated the album a 6 out of 10. He wrote: You can tell from both the production and the performance that you're dealing with a CD of this season, not some 'comeback' tribute.”

== Track listing ==
1. "End of Alone" - 4:24
2. "Evaporate" - 4:00
3. "Love's Dying Wish" - 4:07
4. "Unknown Superstar" - 4:24
5. "Hide" - 4:18
6. "Building a Wall" - 4:33
7. "Beautiful Disaster" - 4:09
8. "Live Your Life" - 4:00
9. "Hello, Are You Listening?" - 3:54
10. "Changes Me" - 4:41
11. "The Day Belongs to Us" - 4:41
12. "This Close" - 5:06

== Personnel ==
- Tony Harnell - lead vocals
- Magnus Karlsson - guitars, keyboards, piano
- Jonni Lightfoot - bass
- John Macaluso - drums, percussion
