= In Your Multitude =

1995 studio album by Conception

Studio album by Conception
- Released: 3 May 1995
- Recorded: 1995
- Studio: Stairway to Heaven Studios
- Genre: Progressive power metal
- Length: 49:59
- Label: Noise
- Producer: Tommy Newton

Conception chronology
Parallel Minds (1993)	In Your Multitude (1995)	Flow (1997)

In Your Multitude is the third studio album by the Norwegian progressive power metal band, Conception, released in 1995. In 2025, it was ranked by Loudwire as the 12th best progressive metal album of the 1990s.

== Track listing ==
All lyrics are written by Roy Khan; all music is composed by Tore Østby, except where noted.

In Your Multitude track listing
No.	Title	Music	Length
1.	"Under a Mourning Star"		5:09
2.	"Missionary Man"	Østby/Khan	3:40
3.	"Retrospect"	Østby/Arve Heimdal	3:12
4.	"Guilt"	Østby/Khan	3:47
5.	"Sanctuary"		2:57
6.	"A Million Gods"		7:45
7.	"Some Wounds"	Østby/Heimdal/Ingar Amlien	4:35
8.	"Carnal Comprehension"		4:22
9.	"Solar Serpent"	Østby/Heimdal/Amlien	3:56
10.	"In Your Multitude"		6:38

Japanese bonus track
No.	Title	Writer(s)	Length
11.	"Gravity"	Østby/Roy Khan	3:22

Bonus vinyl
No.	Title	Length
1.	"Guilt"	5:03
2.	"Sundance"	4:30

== Personnel ==
All information from the album booklet.

Band members

- Roy Khan – vocals
- Tore Østby – guitar
- Ingar Amlien – bass
- Arve Heimdal – drums

Additional personnel

- Trond Nagell-dahl – keyboards
- Tommy Newton – guitars on "Guilt", producer, engineering, mixing, mastering
- Wilhelm Makkee – mastering
- Stefano Scheiba – engineering assistant
- Martin Romeis – photography
- Thomas Bucher – layout, typography
- Michael Albers – cover art
