= Starbreaker (album) =

Studio album by Starbreaker
- Released: March 21, 2005
- Recorded: 2005
- Genre: Heavy metal Hard rock
- Length: 56:13
- Label: Frontiers

Starbreaker chronology
Starbreaker (2005)	Love's Dying Wish (2008)

Professional ratings
Review scores
Source	Rating
Rock Reviews	link
Rock Eyez	link

Starbreaker is the self-titled debut album of the Tony Harnell-led heavy metal band Starbreaker, released on March 21, 2005, while Harnell was still in TNT.

== Track listing ==
1. "Die for You" - 4:31
2. "Lies" - 5:25
3. "Break My Bones" - 4:25
4. "Crushed" - 4:36
5. "Days of Confusion" - 4:23
6. "Transparent" - 4:34
7. "Light at the End of the World" - 3:59
8. "Cradle to the Grave" - 3:54
9. "Underneath a Falling Sky" - 4:26
10. "Turn It Off" - 4:09
11. "Dragonfly" [Instrumental] - 4:09
12. "Save Yourself" - 3:52
13. "Days of Confusion" [Acoustic] - 3:44

== Personnel ==
- Tony Harnell – lead vocals
- Magnus Karlsson – guitars, keyboards
- Fabrizio Grossi – bass
- John Macaluso – drums, percussion
