= Knights of the New Thunder =

Studio album by TNT
- Released: 2 October 1984
- Recorded: Nidaros Studios, Trondheim
- Genre: Heavy metal
- Length: 34:21
- Label: PolyGram
- Producer: Bjørn Nessjø

TNT chronology
| TNT (1982) | Knights of the New Thunder (1984) | Tell No Tales (1987) |

Alternative cover
- Original withdrawn cover

Professional ratings
Review scores
| Source | Rating |
|---|---|
| Allmusic | 4/5 stars |

Knights of the New Thunder is the second studio album by the Norwegian rock band TNT. It was the first TNT album recorded with their new vocalist Tony Harnell, who had replaced their original singer Dag Ingebrigtsen. It was their last album playing traditional heavy metal, as their later releases have a more commercial/glam metal style.

Most of the songs on the album had been written and recorded as demos while Ingebrigtsen was still in the band, but most of the lyrics were rewritten by Harnell. Some of the song titles were also changed; "Toys for Boys" and "Black Sheep of Valhalla" became "Break the Ice" and "Knights of the Thunder", respectively. Two songs from TNT's self-titled first album, "USA" and "Eddie", were re-recorded and included on the album, though "Eddie" was an exclusive bonus track on the CD edition in Europe, and replaced "Tor with the Hammer" on U.S. editions. "Eddie" also came on the single American Tracks bundled with the LP in Europe.

The album's original cover art featured an illustration of half-naked women and caused controversy in Norway. A new cover was made and used for the national and international editions, except for Japan where the album was released with its original cover.

== Track listing ==
| No. | Title | Writer(s) | Length |
|---|---|---|---|
| 1. | "Seven Seas" | TNT | 4:15 |
| 2. | "Ready to Leave" | Ronni Le Tekrø | 2:57 |
| 3. | "Klassisk Romance" (instrumental) | Ronni Le Tekrø | 0:58 |
| 4. | "Last Summer's Evil" | Ronni Le Tekrø, Tony Harnell, TNT | 2:36 |
| 5. | "Without Your Love" | Tony Harnell, Dag Ingebrigtsen, Ronni Le Tekrø | 3:50 |
| 6. | "Tor with the Hammer" | Dag Ingebrigtsen, Tony Harnell | 2:20 |
| 7. | "Break the Ice" | Diesel Dahl, Tony Harnell, Dag Ingebrigtsen | 2:22 |
| 8. | "U.S.A." | Gustav Alfheim, Tony Harnell, Dag Ingebrigtsen, Ronni Le Tekrø | 3:40 |
| 9. | "Deadly Metal" | Gustav Alfheim, Ronni Le Tekrø, Tony Harnell | 2:30 |
| 10. | "Knights of the Thunder" | Morten "Diesel" Dahl, Tony Harnell, TNT | 4:10 |

CD edition
| No. | Title | Writer(s) | Length |
|---|---|---|---|
| 11. | "Eddie" | Dag Ingebrigtsen, Steel, TNT | 4:43 |

== Personnel ==
TNT

- Tony Harnell – vocals (credited as Tony Hansen)
- Ronni Le Tekrø – guitars
- Morty Black – bass guitar, synthesizer
- Diesel Dahl – drums, percussion (credited as Diesel Scan-Dahl)

Additional personnel

- Bård Svendsen – keyboards, background vocals

Production

- Bjørn Nessjø – producer
- Rune Nordahl – engineer

== Sources ==
- http://www.cduniverse.com/search/xx/music/pid/1268101/a/Knights+Of+The+New+Thunder.htm
- http://www.ronniletekro.com/discography-album-9.html
