= Tore Østby =

- Born: 1972 (age 53–54)
- Origin: Norway
- Genres: Progressive metal; progressive rock; power metal; hard rock
- Occupations: Musician; songwriter; producer
- Instruments: Guitar; bass
- Years active: 1991–2005; 2007–present
- Labels: Noise; Laser's Edge/Sensory
- Website: www.rollthefire.com

Tore Østby (born 1972) is a founder, guitarist, producer, and songwriter for Norwegian progressive metal band Conception. After the band stopped playing on a permanent basis (the band was active from 1989 to 1998 and went on a 10-year hiatus) he, along with John Macaluso and Jørn Lande formed progressive metal band Ark.

Tore is currently working as a senior advisor at GramArt, an organization established in 1989 to protect the recording artists’ intellectual property rights, other legal rights, and professional interests.

On 30 April 2018 it was announced that Tore's original band Conception was reunited with new material.

Tore is married to Swedish guitarist Maria Engström Østby and they live with daughter Matilda in Stockholm.

== Discography ==
=== With Conception ===
Studio albums

- The Last Sunset (1991)
- Parallel Minds (1993)
- In Your Multitude (1995)
- Flow (1997)
- State of Deception (2020)

EPs

- My Dark Symphony (2018)

=== With Ark ===
- Ark (1999)
- Burn the Sun (2001)

=== With D.C. Cooper ===
- D.C. Cooper (1999)

=== With Jørn Lande ===
- Starfire (2000)

=== With Street Legal ===
- Bite the Bullet (2009)
