= My Dark Symphony =

2018 EP by Conception

EP by Conception
- Released: 23 November 2018
- Recorded: 2018
- Studios: MLP Studios (Dokka); Stable Studios (Oslo); Conception Sound Factory Studios
- Genre: Progressive metal
- Length: 26:41
- Producers: Tore Østby; Roy Khan

Conception chronology
Flow (1997)	My Dark Symphony (2018)	State of Deception (2020)

Singles from My Dark Symphony
- 1. "Re:Conception" Released: 2 November 2018

Professional ratings
Review scores
Source	Rating
My Global Mind	8 stars on a 10-point scale

My Dark Symphony is the first EP by the Norwegian progressive metal band, Conception. It is the first Conception EP with new original material since their fourth studio album Flow in 1997, and was released on 23 November 2018.

== Track listing ==
My Dark Symphony track listing
No.	Title	Writer(s)	Length
1.	"Re:Conception"	T.Østby/Roy Khan	1:08
2.	"Grand Again"	T.Østby/Roy Khan	4:00
3.	"Into the Wild"	T.Østby/Roy Khan/Heimdal/Amlien	5:21
4.	"Quite Alright"	T.Østby/Roy Khan/Heimdal	4:33
5.	"The Moment"	T.Østby/Roy Khan	5:27
6.	"My Dark Symphony"	T.Østby/Roy Khan/Heimdal	6:12

=== Notes ===
- The EP is included on the second disc of the Japanese release for the band's fifth studio album, State of Deception.

== Personnel ==
All information from the EP booklet.

Band members

- Roy Khan – vocals, orchestration and choir backing on track 5, engineer
- Tore Østby – guitar, keyboards, orchestration, choir backing on track 5, engineer
- Ingar Amlien – bass
- Arve Heimdal – drums

Additional musicians

- Aurora Heimdal – backing vocals on tracks 3 and 6, choir backing on track 5
- Maria Engstrom Østby – talking voice on track 4, choir backing on track 5
- Miro – keyboards, orchestrations (tracks 1–4, 6)

The Family Choir

- Eva Strømhaug Sæverud, Filip Lopes Sousa, Ida Åman, Gun Engvall, Matilda Engström Bergkvist, Melina Fagerström Jusufagic, Natália Lopes, Rafael Tore Lopes Sousa, Sira Gassama, Sixten Engvall Adamo, Vasco Sousa

Production

- Nils Harald Mæhlum – engineer
- Leif Johansen – engineer, choir backing on track 5
- Stefan Glaumann – mixing
- Svante Forsback – mastering
- Seth Siro Anton – artwork
- Gustavo Sazes – layout
- My Olausson – additional graphic design
