= Parallel Minds =

1993 studio album by Conception

Studio album by Conception
- Released: 10 November 1993
- Recorded: 1993
- Studios: Stairway to Heaven Studios; Cas Studios
- Genre: Progressive power metal
- Length: 46:37
- Label: Noise
- Producer: Tommy Newton

Conception chronology
The Last Sunset (1991)	Parallel Minds (1993)	In Your Multitude (1995)

Singles from Parallel Minds
- 1. "Roll the Fire / Silent Crying" Released: 1994

Parallel Minds is the second studio album by the Norwegian progressive power metal band, Conception, released on 10 November 1993.

== Track listing ==
All lyrics are written by Roy Khan, except "My Decision", co-written by Ingar Amlien; all music is composed by Tore Østby.

Parallel Minds track listing
No.	Title	Length
1.	"Water Confines"	4:17
2.	"Roll the Fire"	4:32
3.	"And I Close My Eyes"	4:11
4.	"Silent Crying"	3:16
5.	"Parallel Minds"	4:42
6.	"Silver Shine"	4:43
7.	"My Decision"	4:46
8.	"The Promiser"	3:34
9.	"Wolf's Lair"	3:59
10.	"Soliloquy": I. "Sweet Lavender"; II. "Non-Electric Redemption"; III. "In These Rooms"	9:05

=== Notes ===
- The Japanese edition of the album features lyrics to the band's song "Black on Black" in the booklet, but does not feature the song on the Japanese releases.

== Personnel ==
All information from the album booklet.

Band members

- Roy Khan – vocals
- Tore Østby – guitars
- Ingar Amlien – bass
- Arve Heimdal – drums

Additional personnel

- Hans Chr. Gjestvang – keyboards
- Michael Albers – cover art
- Tommy Newton – producer, engineering, mixing
- Ingo Chilmud – engineering
- Peter Vahlefeld – graphics
