= Round Trip (Tony Harnell album) =

Studio album by Tony Harnell & The Mercury Train
- Released: July 2, 2010
- Recorded: Late 2008–Mid 2009
- Genres: Hard rock, acoustic rock
- Label: Frontiers (FR CD 468)

Tony Harnell & The Mercury Train chronology
Cinematic (2008)	Round Trip (2010)

Professional ratings
Review scores
Source	Rating
Rock N' Roll Report	(positive)

Round Trip is the debut album by former TNT singer Tony Harnell, released on July 2, 2010, credited to Tony Harnell & The Mercury Train. Although it is considered a solo album, Harnell says this is not his solo album but rather a project, while his debut solo album is yet to be released.

The album is a collection re-recordings of classic Harnell songs from his previous bands TNT and Westworld, in a new stripped-down acoustic form, along with a new song recorded especially for this release - "Anywhere But Here".

Track 12, "When I'm Away," is listed in the liner notes as a bonus track.
Some copies had a sticker on the cover which mistakenly advertised songs by Starbreaker being included.

== Track listing ==
No.	Title	Length
1.	"Somebody Told You" (originally by TNT from the album Firefly, 1997)	3:21
2.	"Intuition" (originally by TNT from the album Intuition, 1989)	4:07
3.	"Month of Sundays" (originally by TNT from the album Firefly, 1997)	3:56
4.	"Lonely Nights" (originally by TNT from the album My Religion, 2004)	3:50
5.	"Shame" (originally by Westworld from the album Westworld, 1999)	4:38
6.	"Northern Lights" (originally by TNT from the album Tell No Tales, 1987)	4:28
7.	"Down to The River to Pray" (traditional)	0:38
8.	"Satellite" (originally by TNT from the album Give Me a Sign EP, 2003)	2:48
9.	"10K Lovers" (originally by TNT from the album Tell No Tales, 1987)	4:00
10.	"Uninvited" (Alanis Morissette cover, originally by Westworld from the album Skin, 2000)	5:08
11.	"Ready to Fly" (originally by TNT from the album All the Way to the Sun, 2005)	4:51
12.	"When I'm Away" (bonus track, originally by TNT from the album My Religion, 2004)	2:39
13.	"Song for Dianne" (originally by TNT from the album My Religion, 2004)	3:17
14.	"Anywhere But Here" (new song)	3:31

== Personnel ==
- Tony Harnell – lead vocals

The Mercury Train

- Jason Hagen – acoustic guitar, ukulele
- Chris Foley – electric guitar
- Brandon Wilde – bass, vocals
- Brad Gunyon – drums, percussion
- Amy Harnell – vocals, descant recorder

Additional personnel

- Sandi Saraya – guest vocals on "Shame"
- Tony Harnell – lead vocals

The Wildflowers

- Ron Bumblefoot – guitar, vocals
- Amy Harnell – vocals, descant recorder
- Cassandra Sotos – violin
- Jason Hagen – acoustic guitar
