= Tony Harnell =

American singer (born 1962)

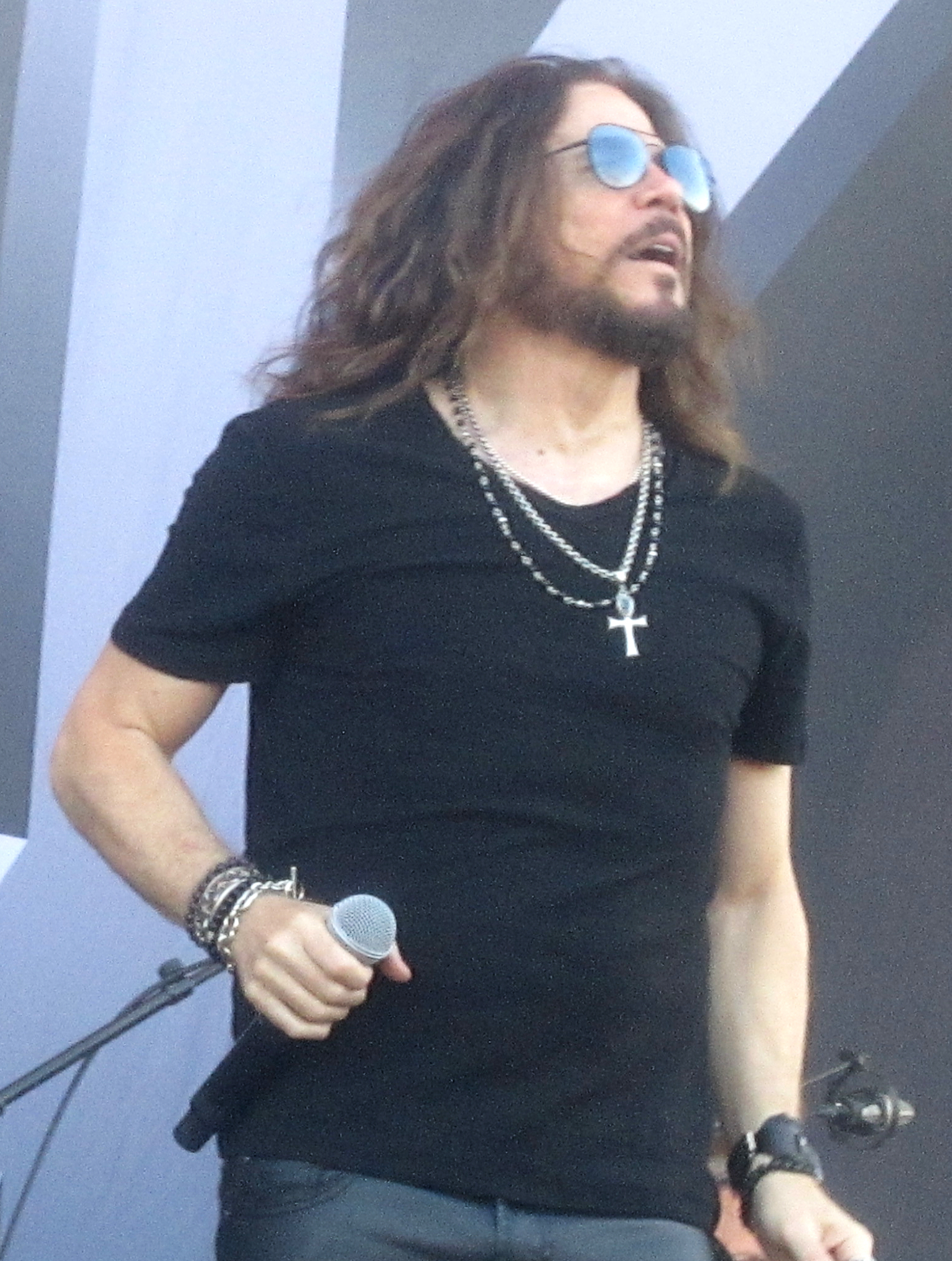
- Harnell performing with TNT at the 2023 Sweden Rock Festival

Background information
- Born: September 18, 1962 (age 63); San Diego, U.S.
- Genres: Hard rock; heavy metal; glam metal; acoustic rock
- Occupations: Singer; songwriter
- Years active: 1980–present
- Labels: Frontiers
- Member of: TNT
- Formerly of: The Jackals; Westworld; Starbreaker; Skid Row
- Website: tonyharnell.com

Tony Harnell (born September 18, 1962) is an American singer, best known for his work with Norwegian hard rock band TNT. He is known for his wide vocal range, with his modal voice spanning over four octaves. Harnell has also been the frontman of Starbreaker and Skid Row.

== Biography ==
=== Early life ===
Harnell was born in San Diego and grew up in California. His mother, Constance Haldaman, was an opera singer while his father, Boyd Harnell, was a photojournalist. He has an older half-sister by his father. Harnell started singing at the age of five and was a competitive skateboarder and avid surfer as a teenager. At age 16, Harnell moved to New York City and joined his first band at age 17. Harnell started taking vocal lessons with Don Lawrence at age 18.

=== The Jackals ===
After moving to New York City, Harnell played with various bands, including the Bronx-based band the Jackals. which included John Tempesta on drums. Over two years, the band would gain enough popularity to sell out rock clubs and became Harnell's breakthrough. In 1984, Harnell left the Jackals to join Norwegian band TNT. Harnell initially intended to return to the New York band, but after recording with TNT and being impressed with the band's level, he decided to fully commit to his new band.

=== TNT ===
After a show with the Jackals in 1984, Harnell was introduced to record producer Mike Varney, the then-manager of the Norwegian band TNT, who mentioned that they were looking for a singer and had heard a demo by the Jackals. Harnell was given a tape of TNT material which consisted of one side featuring TNT's recently fired singer and another side with only instrumentals. Harnell soon decided to depart for Norway and recorded the album Knights of the New Thunder with the band.

Harnell and guitarist Ronni Le Tekrø wrote all of TNT's material together during Harnell's 22-year stint with the band. With Harnell, TNT recorded nine studio albums, two live videos, and two "best of" compilations. He left the band in April 2006 for personal and professional reasons. He performed his last show with the band on June 30, 2006, with his penultimate performance being recorded for the live album Live In Madrid released that autumn.

On October 17, 2013, Harnell announced that he had rejoined TNT. After a year and a half absence, during which he fronted Skid Row, Harnell announced another return to TNT in May 2016. Harnell would leave the band once again in October 2017 and was replaced by previously unknown Baol Bardot Bulsara. In November 2022, TNT announced that Harnell had rejoined the band.

=== Morning Wood ===
Morning Wood was an acoustic rock supergroup composed of Harnell, Al Pitrelli, Chuck Bonfonte, and Danny Mirada. Their debut self-titled album was initially released in Japan in 1994 during TNT's first break-up and re-released in Europe in 2002, then credited to "Tony Harnell and Morning Wood".

=== Westworld ===
Westworld was a side project of Harnell's that also featured Mark Reale, Bruno Ravel, and John O'Reilly, with keyboardist Josh Pincus and violinist Mark Wood. The band released three studio albums and one live album.

=== Starbreaker ===
Starbreaker was a band featuring Harnell and Magnus Karlsson, with former members including John Macaluso, and Fabrizio Grossi. They released their first album in 2005. Starbreaker's second album, Love's Dying Wish, was released in 2008. Their third studio album, Dysphoria, featuring Harnell and Karlsson among others, was released in January 2019.

=== Sonic the Hedgehog ===
Harnell has done tracks for the Sonic the Hedgehog video game series. His first track for the series was "It Doesn't Matter" on the soundtrack of Sonic Adventure, released in 1998 by SEGA. Harnell returned in 2001 to perform a rewritten version of the theme for Sonic in Sonic Adventure 2, as well as the first stage theme "Escape from the City" with Ted Poley. Following this, in 2004, Harnell performed the Team Sonic theme for Sonic Heroes called "We Can", again with Poley, and in 2011, he returned for Sonic Generations to perform two new remixes of "Escape from the City" with Poley. As of 2021, Harnell also performed "Fly With Me", a theme song for the fan series "Sonic and Tails R" created by Emi Jones, which featured many old cast members of the Sonic The Hedgehog video game series.

=== Solo career ===
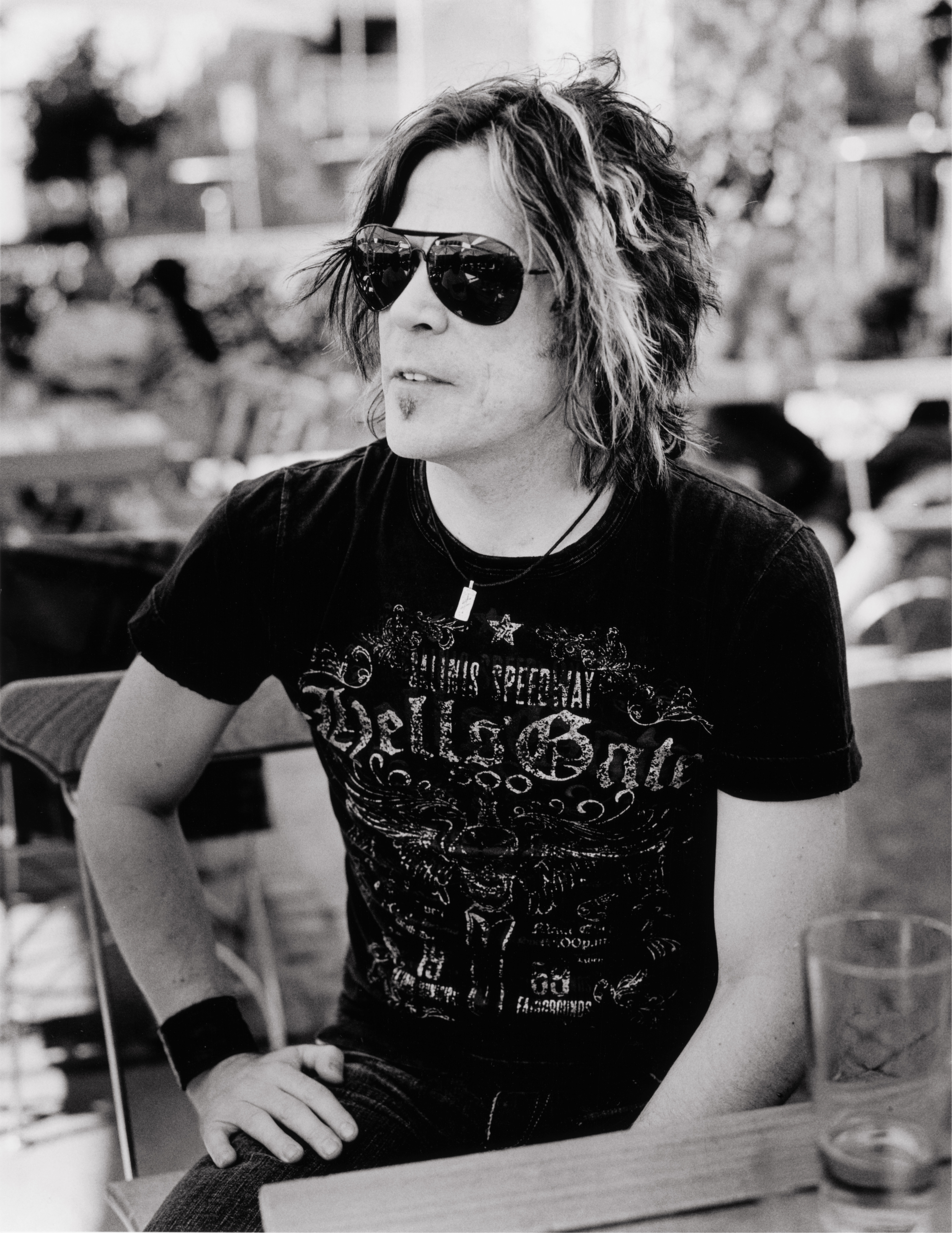
Harnell in 2011

In 2008, Harnell released his first solo material in demo form, the EP Cinematic, through his website. It was followed in 2010 by the Round Trip album under the name Tony Harnell & The Mercury Train, a collection of re-recordings of classic Harnell songs from his previous bands TNT and Westworld in a stripped-down acoustic format. Harnell released the digital single "Take What You're Giving" in 2011 before teaming up with guitarist Ron "Bumblefoot" Thal and others for the Tony Harnell & the Wildflowers featuring Bumblefoot album in 2013.

=== Skid Row ===
On April 6, 2015, it was announced that Johnny Solinger had left American heavy metal band Skid Row. Hours later, the band announced that Harnell would be Solinger's replacement. On December 29, Harnell announced that he had left Skid Row.

=== Lovekillers ===
In 2019, Harnell formed Lovekillers with Fronters' in-house producer, Alessandro Del Vecchio, and others. They released their self-titled debut, Lovekillers feat. Tony Harnell, later that year.

== Discography ==
=== Solo ===
- Tony Harnell & Morning Wood – Morning Wood (1994)
- Cinematic – self-released (2008)
- Tony Harnell & The Mercury Train – Round Trip (2010)
- "Take What You're Giving" – self-released (2011)
- Tony Harnell & the Wildflowers featuring Bumblefoot – Tony Harnell & the Wildflowers featuring Bumblefoot (2013)

=== TNT ===
- Knights of the New Thunder (EU, JP 1984), (US 1985)
- Tell No Tales (1987)
- Intuition (1989)
- Realized Fantasies (1992)
- Three Nights in Tokyo (Live) (1992)
- Till Next Time – The Best of TNT (1995)
- Firefly (1997)
- Transistor (1999)
- The Big Bang – The Essential Collection (2003)
- Give Me A Sign (EU)/Taste (JP) (2003)
- My Religion (2004)
- All the Way to the Sun (2005)
- Live in Madrid (2006)
- Encore: Live In Milano (2019)

=== Westworld ===
- Westworld (1999)
- Skin (2000)
- Cyberdreams (2002)
- Live... In the Flesh (2001)

=== Starbreaker ===
- Starbreaker (2005)
- Love's Dying Wish (2008)
- Dysphoria (2019)

=== As featured artist ===
- Brazen Abbot – My Resurrection (2005)
- Magnus Karlsson's Free Fall – Free Fall (2013)
- Michael Sweet - I'm Not Your Suicide (2014)
- Magnus Karlsson's Free Fall – Kingdom of Rock (2015)

=== Skid Row ===
- "18 and Life" (2015) – single

=== Lovekillers ===
Lovekillers – Lovekillers feat. Tony Harnell (2019)
