= Flow (Conception album) =

1997 studio album by Conception

Studio album by Conception
- Released: 7 April 1997
- Recorded: 1997
- Studio: Stairway to Heaven Studios
- Genre: Progressive power metal
- Length: 43:55
- Label: Noise
- Producer: Tommy Newton

Conception chronology
In Your Multitude (1995)	Flow (1997)	My Dark Symphony (2018)

Flow is the fourth studio album by the Norwegian progressive power metal band, Conception. Flow was released on 7 April 1997 by Noise Records.

== Track listing ==
Flow track listing
No.	Title	Writer(s)	Length
1.	"Gethsemane"	Amlien/T.Østby/Heimdal	5:01
2.	"Angel (Come Walk with Me)"	Amlien/T.Østby/Heimdal	4:24
3.	"A Virtual Lovestory"	T.Østby/Roy Khan	3:46
4.	"Flow"	Amlien/T.Østby/Heimdal	3:44
5.	"Cry"	T.Østby/Roy Khan	5:02
6.	"Reach Out"	T.Østby/Heimdal/Roy Khan	3:34
7.	"Tell Me When I'm Gone"	T.Østby/Roy Khan	4:21
8.	"Hold On"	T.Østby/Roy Khan	4:07
9.	"Cardinal Sin"	T.Østby/Roy Khan	4:01
10.	"Would It Be the Same"	T.Østby/Heimdal/Roy Khan	5:47

Japanese bonus track (moved to track 10 in some editions)
No.	Title	Writer(s)	Length
11.	"Hand on Heart"	T.Østby/Roy Khan/Amlien	3:25

== Personnel ==
All information from the album booklet.

Band members

- Roy Khan – vocals
- Tore Østby – guitar
- Ingar Amlien – bass
- Arve Heimdal – drums

Additional personnel

- Trond Nagell-dahl – keyboards
- Tommy Newton – producer, engineering
- Morten Hansen – photography, cover art
- Asgeir Mickelson – cover art
