= The Last Sunset (album) =

1991 studio album by Conception

Studio album by Conception
- Released: 13 December 1991
- Recorded: 1991
- Studio: Gjøvik lydstudio
- Genre: Progressive power metal
- Length: 51:24
- Labels: CSF Records (original release); Noise (reissue)
- Producers: Conception, Nils H.Mæhlum

Conception chronology
The Last Sunset (1991)	Parallel Minds (1993)

Reissue cover
- Cover to 1993 reissue

The Last Sunset is the debut studio album released by the Norwegian progressive power metal band, Conception. The Last Sunset was originally recorded in 1991 under Conception's own record label CSF Records.

== Track listing ==
All music is composed by Tore Østby, except "The Last Sunset", by Østby and Roy Khan.

The Last Sunset track listing
No.	Title	Lyrics	Length
1.	"Prevision"		1:13
2.	"Building a Force"	Tore Østby, Ingar Amlien	4:34
3.	"War of Hate"	Dag Østby	5:59
4.	"Bowed Down with Sorrow"	T.Østby	6:30
5.	"Fairy's Dance"	T.Østby	5:05
6.	"Another World"	Amlien	6:28
7.	"Elegy"		1:55
8.	"The Last Sunset"	Roy Khan, T.Østby	4:39
9.	"Live to Survive"	D.Østby	5:48
10.	"Among the Gods"	D.Østby	10:39

== Personnel ==
Credits for The Last Sunset adapted from liner notes.

Conception

- Roy Khan − vocals
- Tore Østby − guitars, arrangements
- Ingar Amlien − bass, vocals
- Arve Heimdal − drums

Additional personnel

- Hans Christian Gjestvang − keyboards
- Staffan William-Olsson − keyboards, mixing
- Christine Meyer − vocals on "Bowed Down with Sorrow"
- Sven Kaare Sunde – vocals
- Vidar Karlsen − vocals

Production

- Nils H. Mæhlum − production, engineering, mixing
- Michael Albers − cover art
- Dag Østby − lyrics ("War of Hate", "Live to Survive", "Among the Gods")
- Tom H. Hansen − photography
