= State of Deception =

2020 studio album by Conception

Studio album by Conception
- Released: 3 April 2020
- Recorded: February 2018–November 2019
- Studio: MLP Studio (Dokka); Stable Studios (Oslo); Eastlake Studio (Eina)
- Genre: Progressive metal
- Length: 39:19
- Producer: Tore Østby & Roy Khan

Conception chronology
| My Dark Symphony (2018) | State of Deception (2020) |

Singles from State of Deception
- 1. "Waywardly Broken" Released: 6 March 2020; 2. "By the Blues" Released: 20 March 2020; 3. "Anybody Out There" Released: 21 June 2020

Professional ratings
Review scores
| Source | Rating |
|---|---|
| Metal Storm | 7/10 |
| Sonic Perspectives | 8.1/10 stars |

State of Deception is the fifth studio album by the Norwegian progressive metal band, Conception. It is the band's first album in two decades with new material, and was released on 3 April 2020.

A music video for "No Rewind" was released on 22 May 2021. On 6 June 2021, Conception announced that they would be releasing an expanded edition of the album in 2022, featuring live tracks, re-recordings and new songs.

== Critical reception ==
Alan Cox, a reporter from Sonic Perspectives rated the album 8.1 out of 10, and stated: "State of Deception is not a perfect record. For one, it’s too short. And it could benefit from a couple more killer tracks. But both Khan and Østby provide their really unique 'voices' to deliver something that stands out for flares of uniqueness. It’s a record that requires multiple listens in headphones to fully appreciate for both the songwriting and production, and while it leaves the listener with a whetted appetite more than a fully satisfied stomach, there’s certainly enough to make those who missed Khan and Østby smile. And eagerly wonder what might be coming next."

== Track listing ==
State of Deception track listing
| No. | Title | Writer(s) | Length |
|---|---|---|---|
| 1. | "in: Deception" | T.Østby/Roy Khan | 1:46 |
| 2. | "Of Raven and Pigs" | T.Østby/Roy Khan/Heimdal | 4:45 |
| 3. | "Waywardly Broken" | T.Østby/Roy Khan | 4:38 |
| 4. | "No Rewind" | T.Østby/Roy Khan | 3:11 |
| 5. | "The Mansion" (featuring Elize Ryd) | T.Østby/Roy Khan | 4:35 |
| 6. | "By the Blues" | T.Østby/Roy Khan | 3:59 |
| 7. | "Anybody Out There" | T.Østby/Roy Khan | 5:25 |
| 8. | "She Dragoon" | T.Østby/Roy Khan/Heimdal | 4:56 |
| 9. | "Feather Moves" (Remastered) | T.Østby/Roy Khan | 6:04 |
| Total length: | | | 39:19 |

Disc two (Deluxe edition bonus tracks)
| No. | Title | Length |
|---|---|---|
| 1. | "Roll the Fire 2.0" | 4:41 |
| 2. | "Silent Crying 2.0" | 4:22 |
| 3. | "Monument in Time" | 6:43 |
| 4. | "Your Own Lullaby (For Matilda)" | 3:32 |
| 5. | "Cry" (Live) | 5:53 |
| 6. | "Gethsemane" (Live) | 5:08 |
| 7. | "A Virtual Lovestory" (Live) | 3:49 |
| 8. | "Reach Out" (Live) | 3:44 |
| 9. | "A Million Gods" (Live) | 7:47 |
| 10. | "Flow" (Live) | 5:58 |
| 11. | "Roll the Fire" (Demo) | 5:36 |
| Total length: | | 57:13 |

=== Notes ===
- The Japanese release of the album features two discs, with the second disc including the band's EP, My Dark Symphony.

== Personnel ==
All information from the album booklet.

Band members

- Roy Khan – vocals
- Tore Østby – guitars, keyboards, bass on "Feather Moves"
- Ingar Amlien – bass on tracks 1–8
- Arve Heimdal – drums

Additional musicians

- Elize Ryd – guest vocals on "The Mansion"
- Miro – keyboards on "in: Deception", "No Rewind", "The Mansion" and "Anybody Out There"
- Lars Andre Kvistum – keyboards, piano on "Waywardly Broken" and "The Mansion"
- Lars Christian Narum – organ, mellotron on "Of Raven and Pigs", "By the Blues", "Anybody Out There" and "She Dragoon"
- Aurora Amalie Heimdal – guest vocals on "She Dragoon", backing vocals on tracks 3, 6 and 7

Production

- Seth Siro Anton – artwork
- Gustavo Sazes – layout, design
- Nils Harald Mæhlum – engineering
- Tore Østby – engineering
- John Anders Narum – engineering
- Leif Johansen – engineering
- Stefan Glaumann – mixing
- Svante Forsbäck – mastering
- Lars Lanhead – photography

== Charts ==
Sales chart performance for State of Deception
| Chart (2020) | Peak position |
|---|---|
| Swiss Albums (Schweizer Hitparade) | 75 |
