= Roy Khan =

Norwegian singer (born 1970)

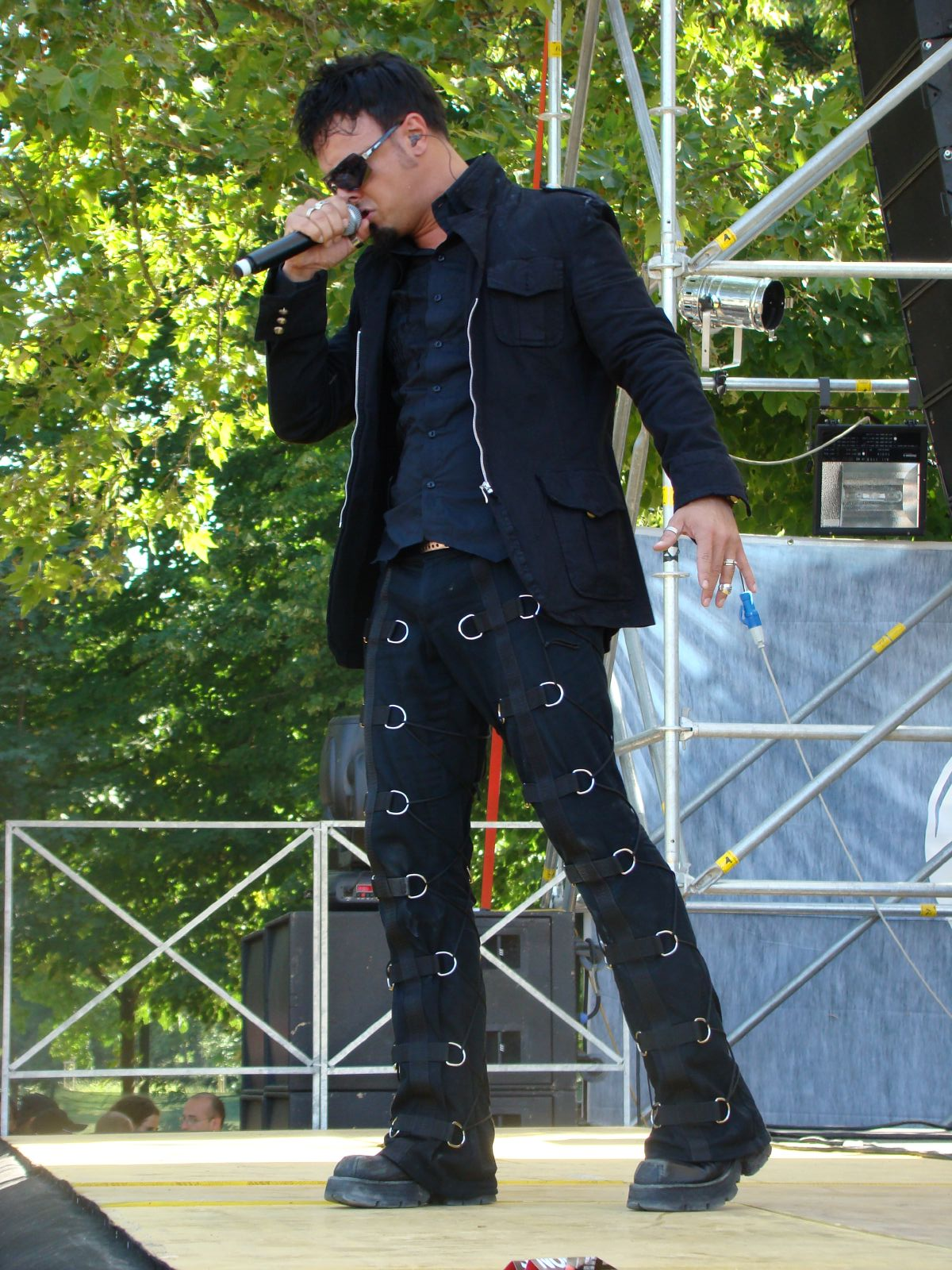
- Khan during a concert in 2007

Background information
- Born: Roy Sætre Khantatat; 12 March 1970 (age 56); Elverum, Norway
- Genres: Symphonic metal; power metal; progressive metal
- Occupations: Singer, songwriter
- Years active: 1991–2011; 2018–present
- Member of: Conception
- Formerly of: Kamelot

Roy Sætre Khantatat (Thai: รอย ขันธทัต; born 12 March 1970), commonly known as Roy Khan, is a Norwegian singer and songwriter. He is the lead singer for the progressive metal band Conception and the former lead vocalist for the American power metal band Kamelot from 1997 until his departure in 2011. He co-wrote most of Kamelot's songs with the band's guitarist and founder Thomas Youngblood during his tenure. Khan had retired from music in 2011 until 2018, when he released a new solo song on YouTube and announced the return of Conception.

== Early life ==
Khan was born 12 March 1970 to a Norwegian mother and Thai father and took both of their last names. Khan's maternal grandfather, Kåre Sætre, was a major influence on his musical aspirations, something Khan would state in several interviews. Sætre would later appear alongside his grandson on stage several times. Khan began singing at a young age, and at the age of 17, while in the shower at school, Khan was caught singing "Alone" by Heart by a fellow student and was offered to join his band. After graduating from high school, Khan studied opera for three years.

During his school years, he shortened "Khantatat" to "Khan" as he found it easier, and frequently used it as a nickname. He is also credited as "Khan" on most early albums.

== Career ==
=== Conception (1991–1998, 2005) ===
After finishing his opera studies, Khan joined the Norwegian progressive metal band Conception, after its previous lead singer quit in 1991. He was selected after several potential singers auditioned. The band released several albums over the coming years before disbanding in 1998, a year after Khan left the band to pursue a career with Kamelot.

In 2005, Khan reunited with Conception and played at the 2005 ProgPower USA VI festival on 16 September and Norwegian Scream Magazine's 15 Years & 100 Issues Festival on 1 October.

=== Kamelot (1997–2011) ===
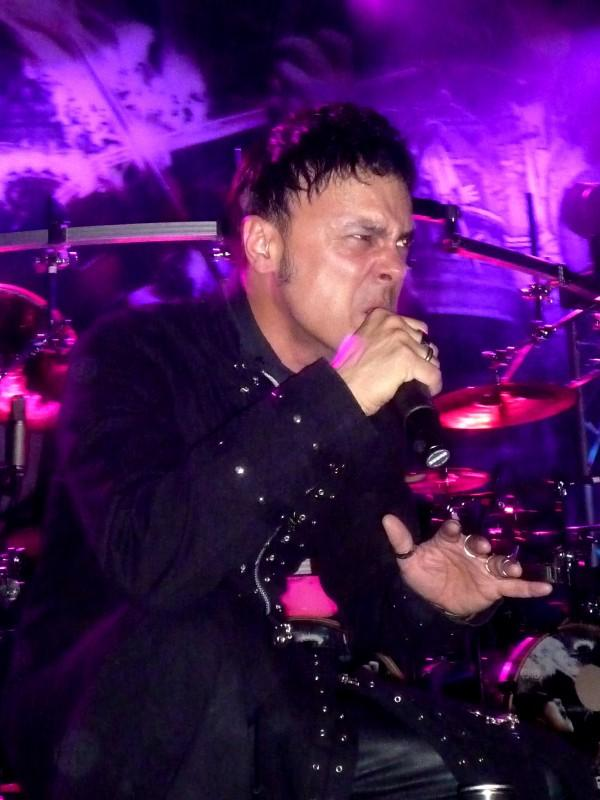
Khan in 2009

In 1997, Khan was invited to join Kamelot by guitarist and founder Thomas Youngblood, after the band's previous vocalist was fired. Khan performed lead vocals on the subsequent releases Siége Perilous (1998), The Fourth Legacy (1999), Karma (2001), Epica (2003), The Black Halo (2005), Ghost Opera (2007), and Poetry for the Poisoned (2010). During his tenure, Khan also co-wrote most of the songs alongside Youngblood, most notably on Poetry for the Poisoned.

On 14 August 2010, Kamelot performed in Hungary for what would turn out to be their final performance with Roy Khan. A few weeks later, it was announced that Khan would not be joining the first North American leg of the upcoming tour in support of Poetry for the Poisoned due to illness, with the band initially planning to use a replacement vocalist, before later deciding to postpone the North American tour entirely while he recovered.

After much speculation among fans and media that Khan was seriously ill or had left the band, Khan himself confirmed his departure from the band in his blog on 21 April 2011, with the band making the formal announcement the day after. In the announcement, Youngblood wrote that Khan had been given a lot of time to make the decision and the band respected it. The tour eventually went on with Fabio Lione filling in on vocals, while his permanent replacement, Tommy Karevik, joined Kamelot the following year.

=== Retirement (2011–2017) ===
In a brief interview with local Norwegian media in 2014, Khan stated that he had suffered a burnout, and decided to quit the band before the tour in 2010 to prioritize his health and family, but in an agreement with Youngblood and the rest of the band, they would not announce his departure in case he recovered and changed his mind. In a 2018 interview with Italian magazine Loud and Proud, Khan elaborated on his final years with Kamelot, stating that he had become gradually more and more burned out due to overworking himself, suffering from insomnia and depression. He stated that the decision to quit the band was made after performing at Wacken that year, as he no longer enjoyed performing.

After his departure, Khan joined the Moss Frikirke local church in Moss, Norway. In 2013, photos of Khan performing psalms at his local church were posted online by a fan page, along with audio recordings of him performing "You Raise Me Up". These were later removed on Khan's request, as he didn't want the attention. In a short statement to the fan page, he confirmed that he still enjoyed metal music, and denied rumours of an upcoming gospel CD, saying he would not be returning to music "any time soon". He worked at the church as a counselor and youth minister until September 2016.

=== Return to music, reunion with Conception (2018–present) ===
On 1 April 2018, Khan released a song on YouTube called "For All", leading many fans to speculate in an upcoming return to music.

On 30 April 2018, it was announced that Khan and the other members of Conception had reunited, proving the speculations of his return to music to be true.

Over subsequent years, Khan contributed guest vocals to music by several other groups and artists, including Athena XIX, Avantasia, Entering Polaris, Genus Ordinis Dei, Maestrick, Serenity, Seven Spires, Star One, and World of Damage.

On 26 February 2026, Khan began work on his first solo album.

== Discography ==
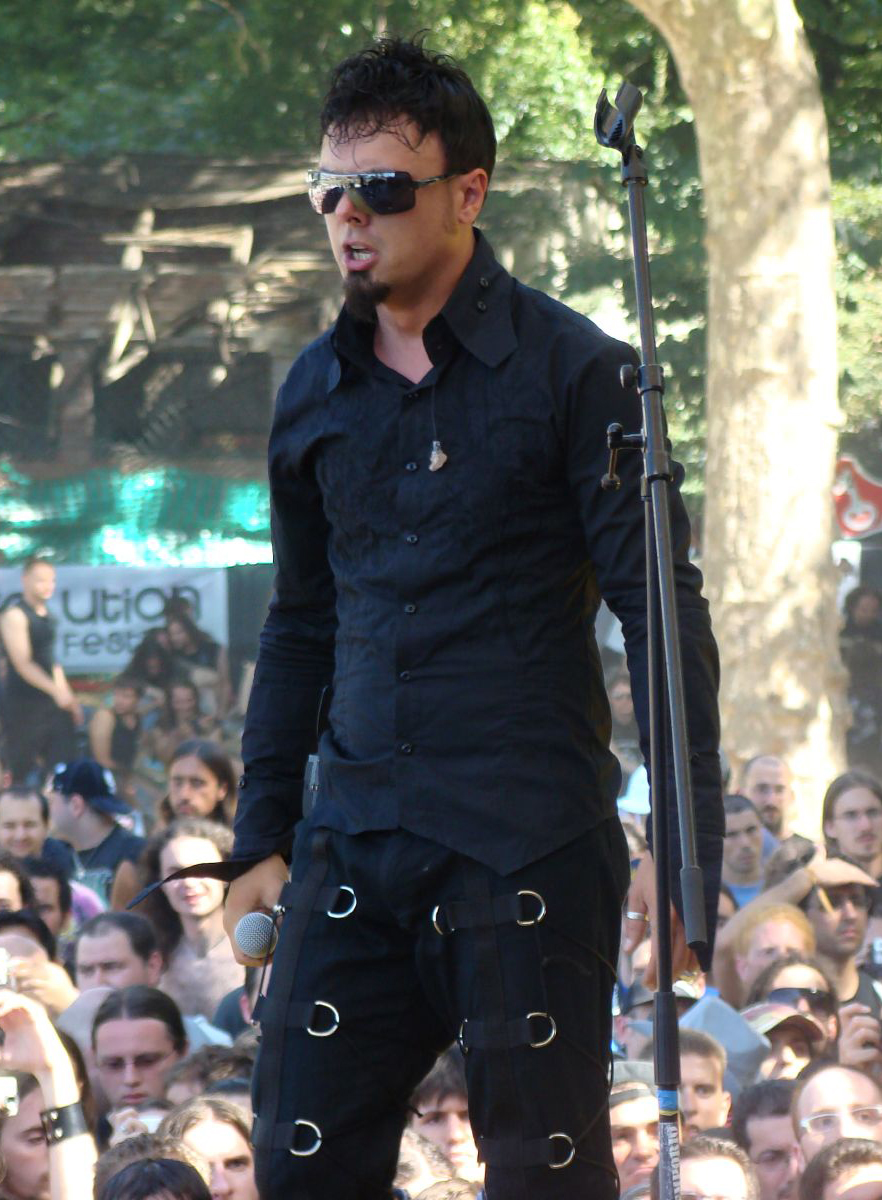
Khan in 2007

=== With Conception ===
Studio albums

- The Last Sunset (1991)
- Parallel Minds (1993)
- In Your Multitude (1995)
- Flow (1997)
- State of Deception (2020)

EPs

- My Dark Symphony (2018)

=== With Kamelot ===
Studio albums

- Siége Perilous (1998)
- The Fourth Legacy (1999)
- Karma (2001)
- Epica (2003)
- The Black Halo (2005)
- Ghost Opera (2007)
- Poetry for the Poisoned (2010)

Live albums

- The Expedition (2000)
- One Cold Winter's Night (2006)
- Ghost Opera: The Second Coming (2008)
