= Tony Harnell & the Wildflowers featuring Bumblefoot =

Tony Harnell & The Wildflowers featuring Bumblefoot

Studio album by Tony Harnell & The Wildflowers featuring Bumblefoot
- Released: May 7, 2013
- Genre: Folk rock
- Length: 40:03
- Label: Dovetone Music
- Producer: Tony Harnell

Tony Harnell & the Wildflowers featuring Bumblefoot is a 2013 album by Tony Harnell and The Wildflowers. The album was released May 7, 2013.

The album features guest contributions from Guns N' Roses guitarist Ron "Bumblefoot" Thal. Thal and Harnell knew each other since 1992, and in 2012 reunited to discuss working together.

The album received partial funding through crowdfunding via PledgeMusic.

== Track listing ==
No.	Title	Length
1.	"Paralyzed"	4:35
2.	"Get Up Again"	4:07
3.	"Runaround"	4:39
4.	"Devil Of A Healer"	4:53
5.	"Burning Daylight"	4:23
6.	"Somebody To Love"	4:48
7.	"What If"	4:48
8.	"Wouldn't Be Human"	3:00
9.	"Child's Play" (live at The Cutting Room)	4:47
Total length:		40:03

== Personnel ==
- Tony Harnell – lead vocals
- Jason Hagen – guitars
- Ron "Bumblefoot" Thal – guitars, vocals
- Cassandra Sotos – acoustic & 7-string electric violins
- Amy Harnell – vocals
- Brad Gunyon – percussion
