= Powermad =

American thrash metal band

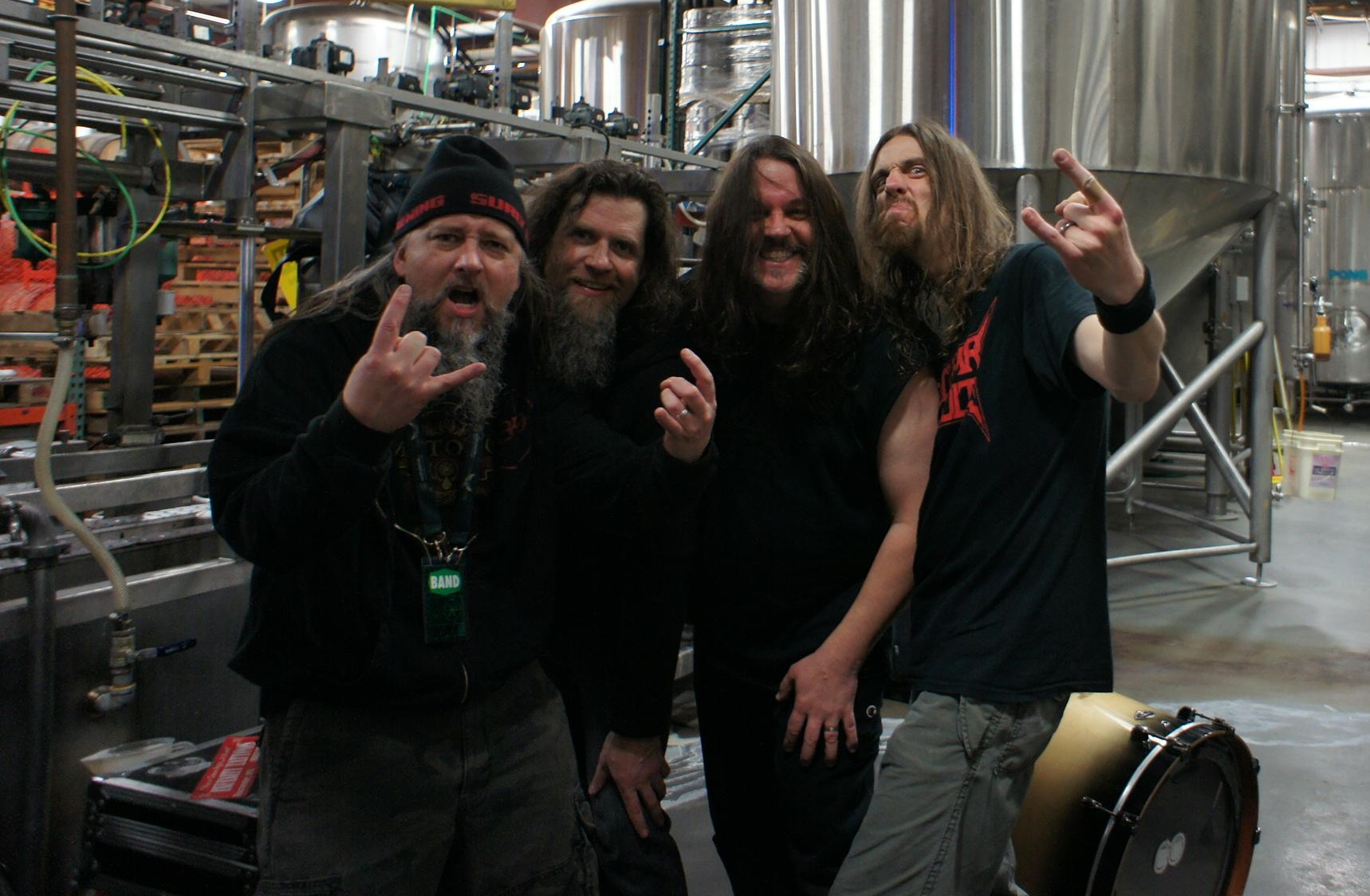
- Powermad in 2012

Background information
- Origin: Minneapolis, Minnesota, U.S.
- Genres: Thrash metal, power metal, speed metal
- Years active: 1984–1990, 2007–present
- Labels: Reprise Records; Century Media Records; Pentacat Records
- Members: Joel DuBay; Jeff Litke; Todd Haug; Dirk Verbeuren

Powermad is an American thrash/speed metal band formed in Minneapolis in 1984. The group has been called an "innovative and often forgotten speed metal band...who infused progressive metal styles and European styles into abstract American speed metal." The band's intricate riff formulations were heavily influenced by thrash metal acts like Metallica and Testament. Vocalist Joel DuBay's singing is easily recognizable with his mixture of singing and high screams.

== History ==
Powermad formed in 1984 in Minneapolis, Minnesota, and released an EP with demos on Combat Records in 1986.

They subsequently signed to Reprise Records and released The Madness Begins... in 1988. The release was mainly distributed via a promotional ad featured in some of the most popular metal magazines of the era. Readers were able to clip this ad and mail it in to Reprise for a free cassette copy of The Madness Begins.... A video for the song "Terminator" was aired on MTV at this time.

Their first and only full-length album until 2015, Absolute Power, was released in 1989. Other than a US tour opening for Overkill, a video featured on MTV of their single "Nice Dreams" and a cameo appearance in the David Lynch film Wild at Heart (where they go from playing their own music to Elvis Presley's with Nicolas Cage singing), Powermad never achieved notable commercial success. Their releases in the 1980s, however, were critically acclaimed and are considered collector's items today by fans of thrash and speed metal music.

In 2007 Powermad resumed touring and started working on a new full-length CD to be released sometime in the future. On February 9, 2008, the band updated their blog on MySpace with a link to download The Madness Begins... and Absolute Power as unprotected mp3s – these have since been removed. On June 23, 2011, Powermad updated their official website with a new design, and an announcement. A new song called Souls Descending was released on their website, and it was made available for download (music video, ogg and mp3) and on YouTube. The downloads are not available anymore, but the video is still on their YouTube channel. In the same update back in 2011 Powermad also announced that Dirk Verbeuren is now the band's drummer.

In late June 2015 the band announced their new proper Facebook page, and in October they announced a new website for their new album release.

The record Infinite, was released on October 9, 2015. The tracks were recorded in various studios (666 Studio, Assembly Line Studios and Die Crawling Studio), and all lyrics are written by Joel DuBay.

On the official Infinite-website media (CD, vinyl and digital downloads), merchandise and bundles are made available for people in the US. People outside the US can order physical editions from Electric Fetus. In addition to Infinite on Electric Fetus, digital versions of The Madness Begins... and Absolute Power are also made available there.

As of February 2020, Powermad has been working on new material for their third album.

== Band members ==
=== Current ===
- Joel DuBay – vocals, guitar (1984–present)
- Todd Haug – guitar (1984–present)
- Jeff Litke – bass (1984–present)
- Dirk Verbeuren – drums (2011–present)

=== Former ===
- Bill Hill – guitar (1984)
- Adrian Liberty – drums (1984–90)
- John Macaluso – drums (1989)
- Dodd Lowder – drums (2007–2011)

== Discography ==
Year	Title	Label	Other information
1986	Powermad	Combat Records	EP, Released as part of the Combat Boot Camp series that put bands' demos on vinyl
1988	The Madness Begins...	Reprise Records	EP, Recorded and mixed at Paisley Park Studios
1989	Absolute Power	Reprise Records	Full-length album
1999	Combat Boot Camp	Century Media Records	Compilation CD split with demos from Have Mercy and Napalm
2015	Infinite	Pentacat Records	Full-length album
