= Tell No Tales =

Studio album by TNT
- Released: 13 April 1987
- Recorded: Norsk Sound Studios, Trondheim / Sound Ideas, New York City
- Genres: Hard rock, glam metal, heavy metal
- Length: 30:26
- Label: PolyGram
- Producer: Bjørn Nessjø

TNT chronology
Knights of the New Thunder (1984)	Tell No Tales (1987)	Intuition (1989)

Professional ratings
Review scores
Source	Rating
AllMusic	4/5 stars
Crash	5–6/6

Tell No Tales is the third studio album by the Norwegian rock band TNT. It was the best-selling TNT album in the U.S., according to their bass guitarist Morty Black. This album diverted from the power metal style of Knights of the New Thunder into a more glam metal direction. Rock Candy Records reissused a remastered CD of the album in February 2022.

== Track listing ==
No.	Title	Writer(s)	Length
1.	"Everyone's a Star"	Tony Harnell, Ronni Le Tekrø	3:21
2.	"10,000 Lovers (In One)"	Harnell, Le Tekrø, Diesel Dahl	2:54
3.	"As Far as the Eye Can See"	Harnell, Le Tekrø	3:41
4.	"Sapphire" (instrumental)	Le Tekrø	1:14
5.	"Child's Play"	Harnell, Le Tekrø	4:25
6.	"Smooth Syncopation" (instrumental)	Harnell, Le Tekrø	0:50
7.	"Listen to Your Heart"	Harnell, Le Tekrø	3:18
8.	"Desperate Night"	Harnell, Le Tekrø	3:33
9.	"Northern Lights"	Harnell, Le Tekrø, Bjørn Nessjø	4:10
10.	"Incipits" (instrumental)	Harnell, Le Tekrø	0:50
11.	"Tell No Tales"	Harnell, Le Tekrø, Dahl	2:21

== Personnel ==
Band

- Tony Harnell – vocals
- Ronni Le Tekrø – guitars, guitar synthesizer
- Morty Black – bass guitar, pedal synthesizer
- Diesel Dahl – drums, percussion

Additional personnel

- Håkon Iversen – background vocals
- Bård Svendsen – keyboards and programming
- Bjørn Nessjø – keyboards and programming
- Carlos Waadeland – keyboards and programming

== Charts ==
=== Album ===
Year	Country	Position
1987	Norway	1
1987	Sweden	41
1987	United States	100

=== Singles ===
Year	Single	Chart	Position
1987	"10,000 Lovers (In One)"	Norway	2
1987	"Everyone's a Star"	Norway	-

== Certification ==
Region	Certification	Certified units/sales
Norway (IFPI Norway)	Gold	50,000

== Album credits ==
- Bjørn Nessjø – producer
- Rune Nordahl – engineer
- Mario Rodriguez – engineer
- Bob Ludwig – mastering
- Mark Weiss – photography
- Jackie Murphy – cover design
- Koppel & Scher – cover design Tom Schwab-Bits and pieces. Dale Matson-Bits and pieces.
