= Starbreaker (band) =

American hard rock band (2004–2019)

- Origin: New York City, NY, US
- Genres: Heavy metal; hard rock
- Years active: 2004–2019
- Label: Frontiers
- Past members: Tony Harnell; Magnus Karlsson; Fabrizio Grossi; John Macaluso; Jonni Lightfoot; Anders Köllerfors

Starbreaker was a heavy metal/hard rock band signed on Frontiers Records. The band has released three full-length studio albums. As of the third album the band has entered dormancy, with no future plans to record new music.

== Band history ==
Starbreaker started as vocalist Tony Harnell's side project while he was still in TNT, after recording the TNT album All the Way to the Sun in 2005. Initially, Harnell was working on a solo record, but with guitarist Magnus Karlsson, former TNT drummer John Macaluso, and bassist Fabrizio Grossi, they formed the new band Starbreaker, rather than a Harnell solo project.

The band recorded its first self-titled studio album in 2005, and it was released on July 13, 2005. After the release of the album, Harnell went back to being the lead vocalist of TNT, but left the band in April 2006 to spend some more time with his family while still writing songs. In late 2007, with Starbreaker as his main musical project, he flew to Sweden to write the bulk of the songs for the new album with Karlsson, and started recording the new songs at the end of the year. The second album was entitled Love's Dying Wish, and was released on August 1, 2008. The album featured new bassist Jonni Lightfoot, who replaced Grossi, and was produced by Harnell and Karlsson, with producer Tommy Hansen (TNT, Pretty Maids, Helloween) as the mixer.

In 2018, Magnus Karlsson and Tony Harnell reunited to record Starbreaker's third album which is titled Dysphoria and was released on January 25, 2019. It also features Jonni Lightfoot on bass and Anders Köllerfors as the new drummer.

== Band members ==
- Tony Harnell – lead vocals (2005–2019)
- Magnus Karlsson – guitars, keyboards, piano (2005–2019)
- Fabrizio Grossi – bass (2005–2007)
- John Macaluso – drums, percussion (2005–2018)
- Jonni Lightfoot – bass (2007–2019)
- Anders Köllerfors – drums, percussion (2018–2019)

== Discography ==
- Starbreaker (2005)
- Love's Dying Wish (2008)
- Dysphoria (2019)
