= John Macaluso =

American drummer

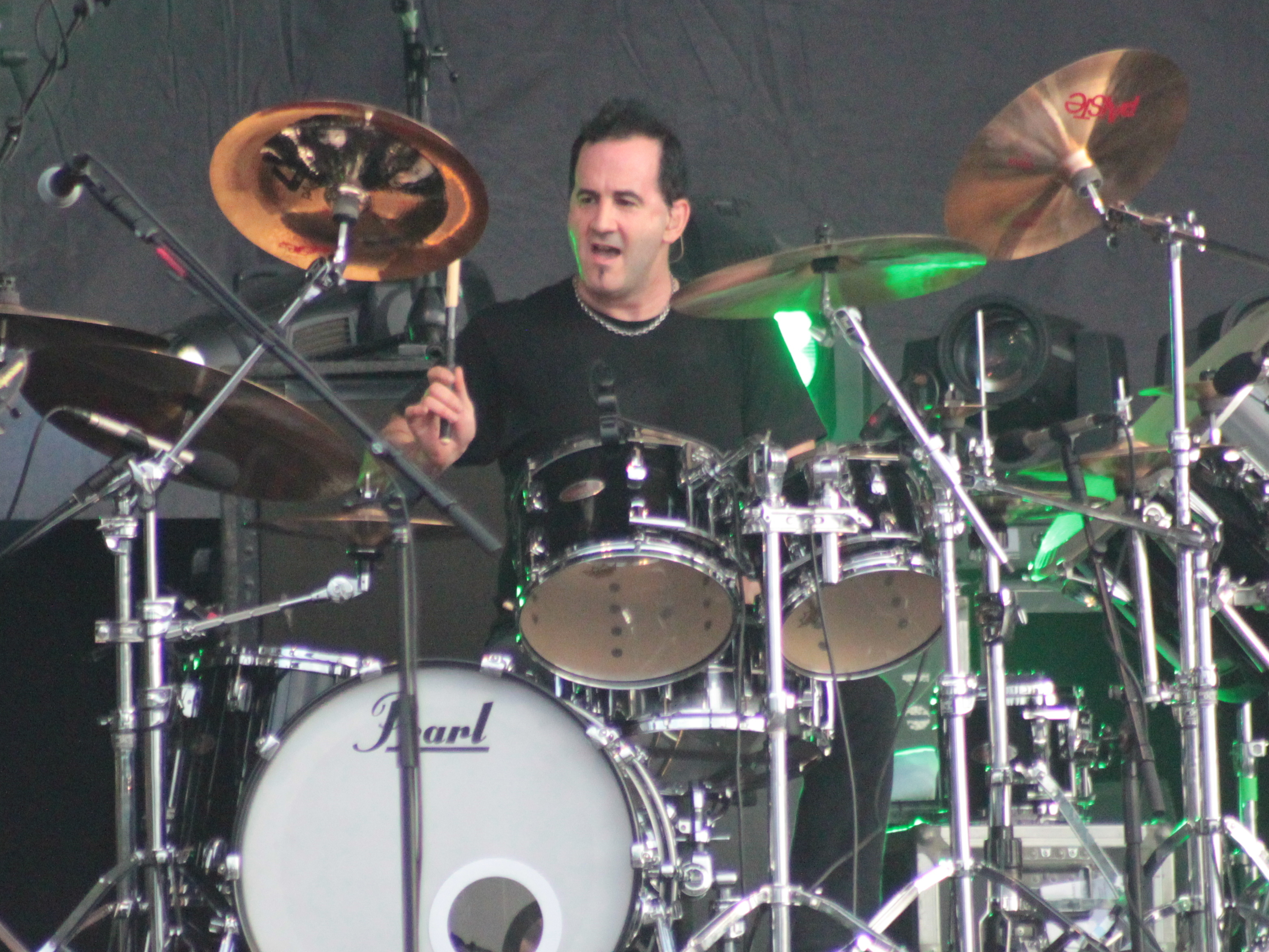
- Macaluso subbing with Symphony X in 2013

Background information
- Also known as: Johnny Mac
- Born: John Macaluso
- Genres: Progressive metal, neoclassical metal, speed metal, hard rock, heavy metal, power metal, glam metal
- Occupations: Musician, drummer, composer
- Instrument: Drums
- Years active: 1986–present
- Labels: Lion Music, Warner Bros., Atlantic
- Member of: Labyrinth
- Formerly of: Powermad, Ark, TNT, Symphony X, Yngwie Malmsteen, Tomorrow's Eve, Starbreaker, Lynch Mob, Riot, Mastercastle, Stone Leaders
- Website: www.johnmacaluso.com

John Macaluso is an American drummer who has played for bands such as Ark, TNT, and Yngwie Malmsteen. Born in Commack, New York, Macaluso started playing drums at age 11. He has recorded over 200 records and played in multiple world tours. He also runs clinics and teaches others.

== Biography ==
=== Education ===
John Macaluso began his studies with his friend and mentor, Joe Franco (Good Rats), of whom Macaluso says, "his playing and teaching changed my life". He later began instruction under Rod Morgenstein (Dixie Dregs), Dom Famularo and Tommy Aldridge (Ozzy Osbourne). At the age of 18, he left his hometown for California to attend the Percussion Institute of Technology, where he studied under Ralph Humphrey (Frank Zappa), Casey Schuerelle, and Joey Heredia. That same year, Macaluso was hired for his first tour, and recorded with guitarist Paul Hansen in Germany.

=== Early career ===
Shortly after John's first recording session, he met guitarist Alex Masi, who he went on to tour and record with from 1987 until this day. John appears on several of Alex's solo records, such as Vertical Invader and the writing collaboration Late Nights At Deserts Rim Rock. The two would then go on to record with bassist Randy Coven to form the trio MCM, Masi, Coven, Macaluso. MCM released the critically acclaimed album, Ritual Factory and its live counterpart, MCM Live 1900 Hard Times.

John joined Powermad in the late 1980s and released Absolute Power on Warner Bros. Records. Movie director David Lynch had come across Absolute Power while writing the Nicolas Cage film, Wild at Heart. Lynch enjoyed the album so much that he decided to feature the track Slaughter House in one scene of the movie. Powermad was flown to California and John Macaluso makes his motion picture debut in two scenes with actors Nicolas Cage and Laura Dern. After touring for almost a year straight, John would end his tenure with Powermad and join the Norwegian-based juggernaut, TNT.

The main riff of the Powermad song Slaughterhouse was also featured as the backing track of an animated self-promotional ad frequently running on MTV Europe in the early 1990s.

John recorded two albums with TNT (one live, one studio) and toured around the globe until the band's demise in 1992. Shortly thereafter, John returned to New York to join Riot, replacing Bobby Jarzombek (Rob Halford). Riot toured extensively, spanning Europe, Japan and the United States on several occasions. Riot then had John appear on The Brethren of the Long House; after this, John left.

=== Work in Progressive Metal ===
John crossed paths with the guitarist Tore Østby in Toten, Norway and they combined their styles to create a heavy groove, progressive rock mixed with a Latin feel. They used a blend of flamenco guitars, double bass drumming and Pink Floyd-like moods, they went on to form the progressive metal band known as Ark. Both albums were received positively by critics. Consisting of vocalist Jørn Lande, bassist Randy Coven (Mountain, Malmsteen), and Mats Olausson (Malmsteen), the band's short history has made history to some. John Macaluso played a vital role in the band's formation, writing and recording, having recorded both albums, ARK and Burn the Sun, with them.

John Macaluso soon gained the attention of guitarist Yngwie Malmsteen, using the first Ark album as the platform to jump to his next project. He hired John to fly down to Florida to rehearse and record Alchemy. John spent three years recording four albums with Malmsteen, spanning multiple world tours. After his tenure with the Malmsteen, John reunited with former Ark members to write and record music until the band's split in 2003.

=== Composing and Recording ===
John spent a short time touring with guitarist George Lynch of Dokken, travelling all over the United States.

After attending The NAMM Show in California, John learns from drummer Mike Portnoy of Dream Theater that his singer, James LaBrie, was looking for a drummer to bring on tour for his solo record Elements Of Persuasion. With Mike's recommendation, John received the call and toured with LaBrie. He would later put out a solo record where he is joined by friends and fellow musicians James LaBrie and guitarist from the band, Marco Sfogli.

Macaluso would later organize and publish a drum method book entitled Repercussions, endorsed by drummers Joe Franco, Nicko McBrain and Bobby Jarzombek.

John soon found himself back with his old friend from TNT, singer Tony Harnell to form Starbreaker. Starbreaker was well received by music fans, journalists and critics alike.

On 2012, after some collaborations with the guitar player Pier Gonella, Macaluso joined the band Mastercastle, recording the drums of their album On Fire.

In April 2013 he joined Symphony X until their drummer Jason Rullo recovers from health problems, supporting them on some South American and European tour dates.

In September 2016, it was announced that Macaluso joined Italian band Labyrinth.

=== Solo career ===
Macaluso was approached by Lion Music for publishing and distributing his first solo album named (John Macaluso & UNION RADIO). It took a year and a half to be written and recorded as it saw Macaluso travel to Italy to write and record with Marco Sfogli (James LaBrie), to France for keyboards, Pennsylvania for piano with Vitalij Kuprij, Canada for vocals with James LaBrie, California for guitar with Alex Masi, aside from England, New Jersey and New York, where he recorded his drum parts.
