= List of Rage band members =

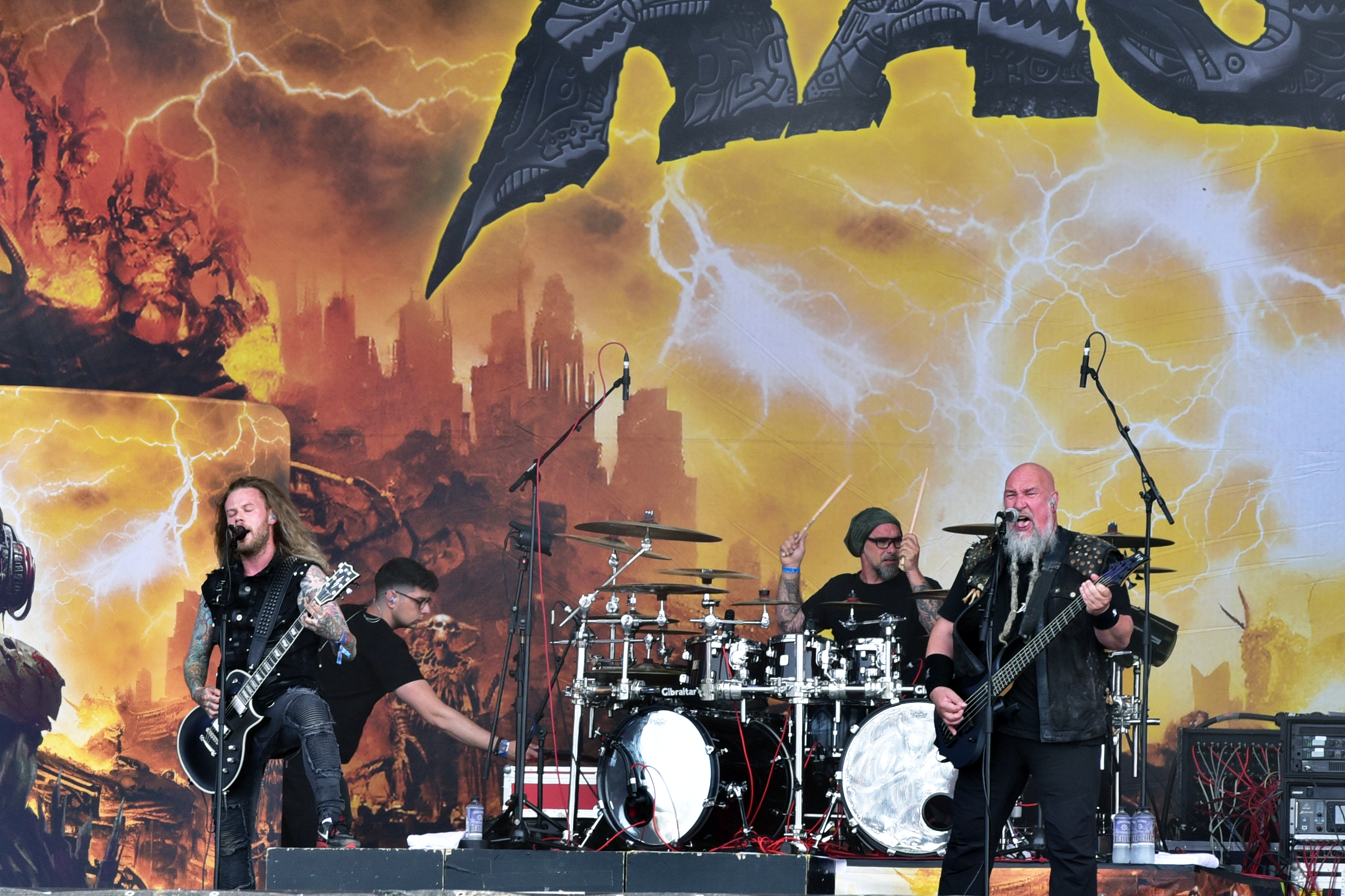
Rage performing live in 2024.

Rage is a German heavy metal band. Formed in early 1983, the group was originally known as Avenger and featured vocalist Peter Burtz, guitarists Jochen Schröder and Alf Meyerratken, bassist Klaus Müller, and drummer Jan Yildiral. By the time the group was renamed Rage in 1986, the lineup included Peter "Peavy" Wagner on vocals and bass, Schröder and Thomas "Guinness" Grüning on guitars, and Jörg Michael on drums. Wagner is the only remaining early member, with the current lineup also featuring drummer Vassilios "Lucky" Maniatopoulos (since 2015) and guitarists Jean Bormann and Stefan Weber (since 2020; Weber has been on hiatus since 2023).

== History ==
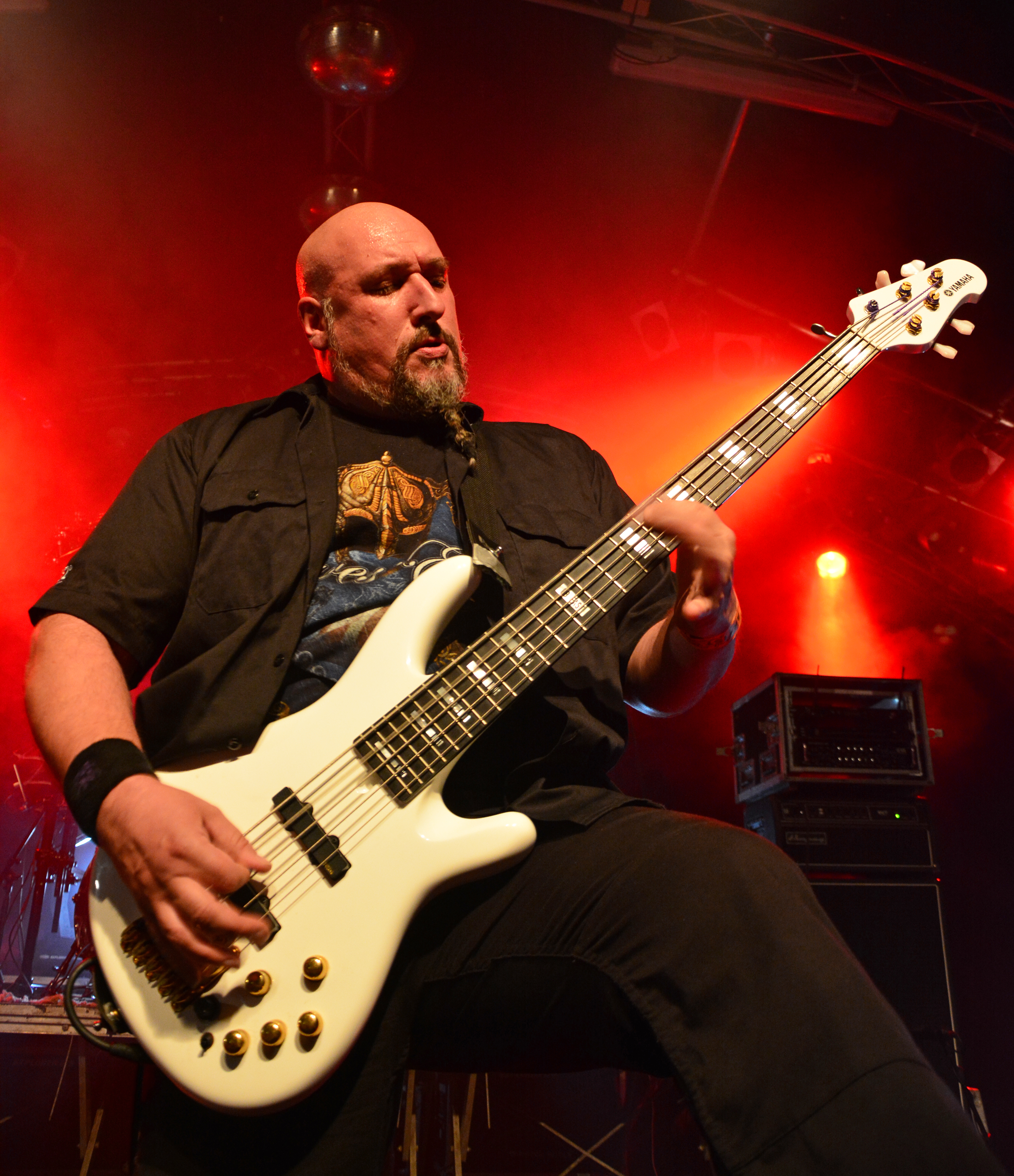
Peter "Peavy" Wagner has been the singer and bassist of Rage since early 1984.

=== 1983–1994 ===
Rage was formed as Avenger in early 1983 by vocalist Peter Burtz, guitarists Jochen Schröder and Alf Meyerratken, bassist Klaus Müller, and drummer Jan Yildiral. After recording a demo, Burtz and Yildiral left near the end of the year to join Steeler. They were replaced at the beginning of 1984 by Peter "Peavy" Wagner (who also took over bass duties) and Jörg Michael, respectively. A second demo followed, before the band recorded its full-length debut Prayers of Steel in October 1984, after which Meyerratken was replaced by Thomas "Guinness" Grüning. Depraved to Black followed in 1985, before Avenger changed their name to Rage and released Reign of Fear in early 1986.

In late 1986, Grüning was replaced by Rudy Graf, who debuted on the 1987 album Execution Guaranteed; that July, shortly after the album's release, Wagner dismissed all three of his bandmates due to their desire to play "more commercial music", subsequently introducing a new three-piece lineup featuring guitarist Manni Schmidt and drummer Chris Efthimiadis. This lineup remained in place for seven years, releasing five studio albums, three EPs and one live video. In February 1994, after the tour in promotion of 1993's The Missing Link, Schmidt left Rage, claiming that he was "tired of the music business and tired of making music"; he later joined Grave Digger in 2000.

=== 1994–2020 ===
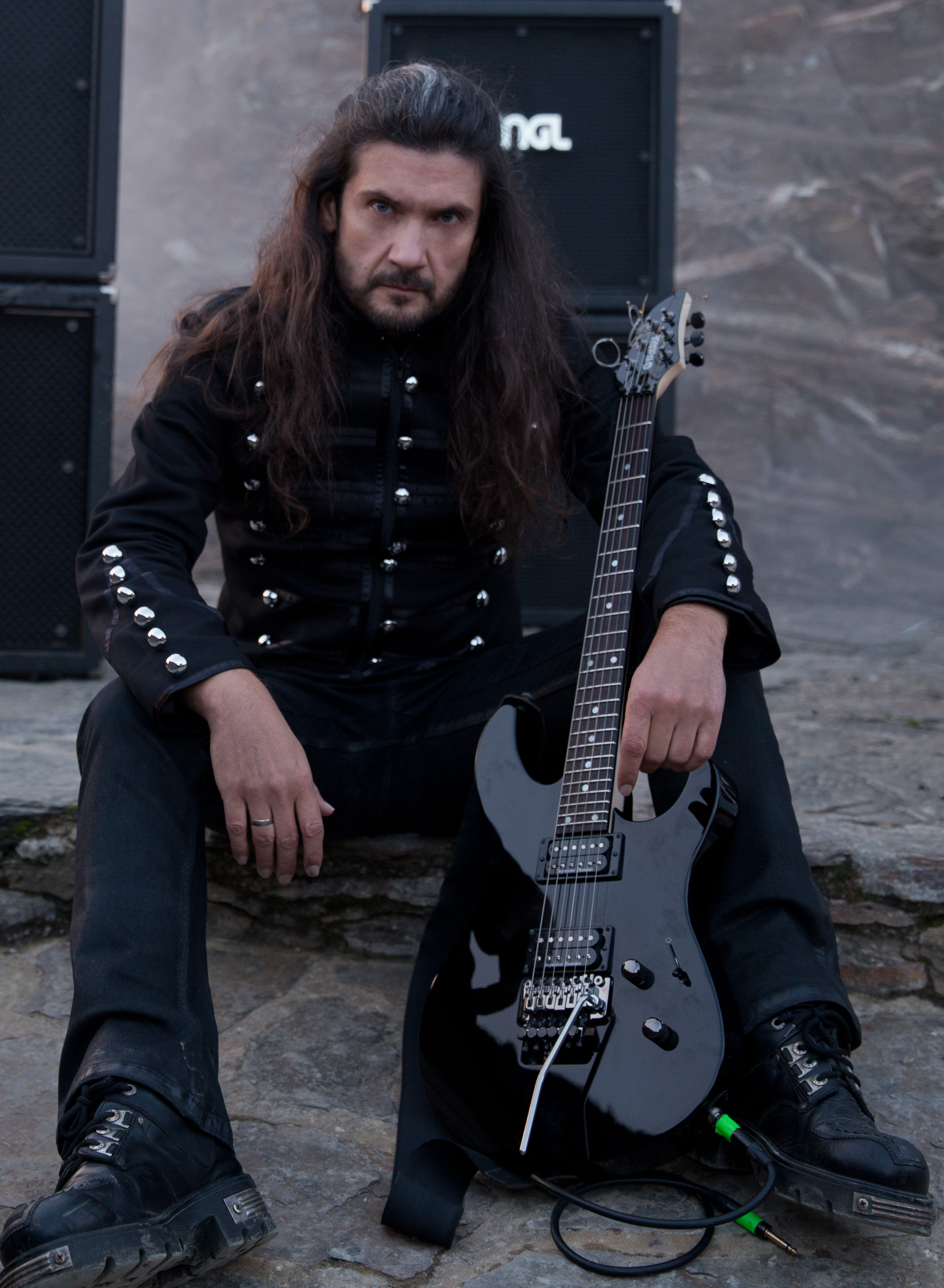
Victor Smolski was Rage's guitarist from 1999 to 2015.

To replace Schmidt, Wagner hired two guitarist — Spiros Efthimiadis, Chris's brother, and Sven Fischer — as he claimed that Efthimiadis alone "wasn't good enough" to take over on his own. The new quartet's first release was 10 Years in Rage, which featured a track on which former members Jochen Schröder, Alf Meyerratken, Jörg Michael, Thomas Grüning, Rudy Graf and Manni Schmidt were all featured. This lineup remained in place until 1999, releasing five more studio albums, two EPs and one live video album. In June 1999, after the recording but before the release of Ghosts, the Efthimiadis brothers and Fischer all departed as a result of various personal and musical disagreements, again leaving Wagner as the sole member of the band.

Rage returned later in the summer of 1999 with a lineup of Wagner, guitarist Victor Smolski and drummer Mike Terrana. This lineup remained in place until December 2006, when Terrana left due to "personal and musical differences". On 1 January 2007, Axxis and Silent Force drummer André Hilgers was unveiled as Terrana's replacement. In February 2015, it was announced that Wagner had parted ways with both Smolski and Hilgers, and would build another new lineup of the band. In June, the new members were announced as guitarist Marco Rodriguez and drummer Vassilios "Lucky" Maniatopoulos. The new trio released The Devil Strikes Again, Seasons of the Black and Wings of Rage, before Rodriguez left after relocating, and was replaced by Jean Bormann and Stefan Weber in June 2020 as Wagner wanted the band to be a four-piece again.

=== Since 2020 ===
After releasing Resurrection Day in 2021, Rage reverted to a trio again starting in July 2023, when Weber went on "indefinite hiatus" due to "personal reasons". The band's next album, 2024's Afterlifelines, did not feature Weber. As of 2026, Weber has still not returned to the band.

== Members ==
=== Current ===
Image	Name	Years active	Instruments	Release contributions
	Peter "Peavy" Wagner	1984–present	lead vocals; bass; acoustic guitar (early)	all Rage releases to date
	Vassilios "Lucky" Maniatopoulos	2015–present	drums; backing vocals	all Rage releases from The Devil Strikes Again (2016) to date
	Jean Bormann	2020–present	lead and rhythm guitars; backing vocals	all Rage releases from "The Price of War 2.0" (2020) to date

=== Former ===
Image	Name	Years active	Instruments	Release contributions
	Jochen Schröder (1962–2021)	1983–1987	lead guitar	all Rage releases from the first Avenger demo (1983) to Execution Guaranteed (1987); 10 Years in Rage (1994) — one track
	Alf Meyerratken	1983–1984	rhythm guitar; backing vocals	Avenger first demo (1983); Avenger second demo (1984); Prayers of Steel (1985); 10 Years in Rage (1994) — one track
	Peter Burtz	1983	lead vocals	Avenger first demo (1983)
	Klaus Müller	1983	bass	Avenger first demo (1983)
	Jan Yildiral	1983	drums	Avenger first demo (1983)
	Jörg Michael	1984–1987	drums	all Rage releases from the first Avenger demo (1983) to Execution Guaranteed (1987); 10 Years in Rage (1994) — one track
	Thomas "Guinness" Grüning	1984–1986	rhythm guitar	Depraved to Black (1985); Reign of Fear (1986); 10 Years in Rage (1994) — one track
	Rudy Graf	1986–1987	rhythm guitar	Execution Guaranteed (1987)
	Chris Efthimiadis	1987–1999	drums	all Rage releases from Perfect Man (1988) to Ghosts (1999); Metal Meets Classic Live (2001)
	Manni Schmidt	1987–1994	lead and rhythm guitars; backing vocals	all Rage releases from Perfect Man (1988) to 10 Years in Rage (1994)
	Spiros Efthimiadis	1994–1999	lead guitar; backing vocals	all Rage releases from 10 Years in Rage (1994) to Ghosts (1999); Metal Meets Classic Live (2001)
	Sven Fischer	1994–1999	rhythm guitar; backing vocals	all Rage releases from 10 Years in Rage (1994) to Ghosts (1999); Metal Meets Classic Live (2001)
	Victor Smolski	1999–2015	lead and rhythm guitars; sitar; cello; keyboards	Ghosts (1999); Welcome to the Other Side (2001); all Rage releases from Unity (2002) to LMO at Master of Rock Festival (2014)
	Mike Terrana	1999–2006	drums; percussion	Ghosts (1999); Welcome to the Other Side (2001); all Rage releases from Unity (2002) to Full Moon in St. Petersburg (2007)
	André Hilgers	2007–2015	drums	all Rage releases from Carved in Stone (2008) to LMO at Master of Rock Festival (2014)
	Marcos Rodriguez	2015–2020	lead and rhythm guitars; backing vocals	The Devil Strikes Again (2016); Seasons of the Black (2017); Wings of Rage (2020)
	Stefan Weber	2020–2023	lead and rhythm guitars	"The Price of War 2.0" (2020); Resurrection Day (2021); Spreading the Plague (2022)

== Lineups ==
Lineups as Avenger

Period	Members	Releases
Early–late 1983	Peter Burtz — lead vocals; Jochen Schröder — lead guitar; Alf Meyerratken — rhythm guitar, backing vocals; Klaus Müller — bass; Jan Yildiral — drums	Avenger first demo (1983)
Early–late 1984	Peavy Wagner — lead vocals, bass; Jochen Schröder — lead guitar; Alf Meyerratken — rhythm guitar, backing vocals; Jörg Michael — drums	Avenger second demo (1984); Prayers of Steel (1985)
Late 1984–early 1986	Peavy Wagner — vocals, bass; Jochen Schröder — lead guitar; Thomas Grüning — rhythm guitar; Jörg Michael — drums	Depraved to Black (1985)

Lineups as Rage

Period	Members	Releases
Early–autumn 1986	Peavy Wagner — vocals, bass; Jochen Schröder — lead guitar; Thomas Grüning — rhythm guitar; Jörg Michael — drums	Reign of Fear (1986)
Autumn 1986–July 1987	Peavy Wagner — vocals, bass; Jochen Schröder — lead guitar; Rudy Graf — rhythm guitar; Jörg Michael — drums	Execution Guaranteed (1987)
July 1987–February 1994	Peavy Wagner — lead vocals, bass; Manni Schmidt — guitar, backing vocals; Chris Efthimiadis — drums	Perfect Man (1988); Secrets in a Weird World (1989); Reflections of a Shadow (1990); Extended Power (1991); Trapped! (1992); Beyond the Wall (1992); The Missing Link (1993); The Video Link (1994); Refuge (1994)
Spring 1994–June 1999	Peavy Wagner — lead vocals, bass; Spiros Efthimiadis — lead guitar, backing vocals; Sven Fischer — rhythm guitar, backing vocals; Chris Efthimiadis — drums	10 Years in Rage (1994); Black in Mind (1995); Lingua Mortis (1996); End of All Days (1996); Live from the Vault (1997); XIII (1998); In Vain: Rage in Acoustic (1998); Ghosts (1999); Metal Meets Classic Live (2001)
June 1999–December 2006	Peavy Wagner — vocals, bass; Victor Smolski — guitar, sitar, cello, keyboards; Mike Terrana — drums, percussion	Welcome to the Other Side (2001); Unity (2002); Soundchaser (2003); From the Cradle to the Stage (2004); Speak of the Dead (2006); Full Moon at St. Petersburg (2007)
January 2007–February 2015	Peavy Wagner — vocals, bass; Victor Smolski — guitar, sitar, cello, keyboards; André Hilgers — drums	Carved in Stone (2008); Strings to a Web (2010); 21 (2012); LMO (2013); LMO at Master of Rock Festival (2014)
June 2015–June 2020	Peavy Wagner — lead vocals, bass; Marcos Rodriguez — guitar, backing vocals; Vassilios Maniatopoulos — drums, backing vocals	The Devil Strikes Again (2016); Seasons of the Black (2017); Wings of Rage (2020)
June 2020–July 2023	Peavy Wagner — lead vocals, bass; Jean Bormann — guitar, backing vocals; Stefan Weber — guitar; Vassilios Maniatopoulos — drums, backing vocals	"The Price of War 2.0" (2020); Resurrection Day (2021); Spreading the Plague (2022)
July 2023–present	Peavy Wagner — lead vocals, bass; Jean Bormann — guitar, backing vocals; Stefan Weber — guitar (on indefinite hiatus); Vassilios Maniatopoulos — drums, backing vocals	Afterlifelines (2024); A New World Rising (2025)
