= The Best from the Noise Years =

Compilation album by Rage
- Released: 2 May 1998
- Recorded: 1986–1994
- Genre: Heavy metal, speed metal, power metal
- Length: 65:52
- Label: Victor Entertainment/Noise Records
- Producer: Rage, Sven Conquest, Armin Sabol

Rage chronology
XIII (1998)	The Best from the Noise Years (1998)	Ghosts (1999)

The Best from the Noise Years is the first compilation album by German heavy metal band Rage, released in 1998, by Victor Entertainment. It is made up of 15 songs from the band's early albums (1986–94), released by Noise Records.

== Track listing ==
No.	Title	Writer(s)	Original album	Length
1.	"Suicide"	Peavy Wagner	Reign of Fear	4:04
2.	"Down by Law"	Wagner	Execution Guaranteed	3:23
3.	"Don't Fear the Winter"	Wagner	Perfect Man	3:27
4.	"Ashes"	Wagner	Extended Power	5:02
5.	"Invisible Horizons"	Wagner	Secrets in a Weird World	4:35
6.	"Light Into the Darkness"	Wagner	Secrets in a Weird World	4:50
7.	"Time Waits for Noone"	Manni Schmidt, Wagner	Secrets in a Weird World	4:49
8.	"Saddle the Wind"	Wagner	Reflections of a Shadow	4:06
9.	"Solitary Man"	Schmidt, Wagner	Trapped!	3:36
10.	"Enough Is Enough"	Schmidt, Wagner	Trapped!	6:42
11.	"Medicine"	Wagner	Trapped!	3:43
12.	"Firestorm"	Schmidt, Wagner	The Missing Link	4:57
13.	"Refuge"	Wagner	The Missing Link	3:39
14.	"Raw Caress"	Wagner	The Missing Link	5:24
15.	"Vertigo"	Wagner	10 Years in Rage	3:35

== Personnel ==
=== Band members ===
- Peavy Wagner – vocals, bass
- Jochen Schroeder – guitars, on tracks 1–2
- Rudy Graf – guitars, on tracks 1–2
- Jörg Michael – drums, on tracks 1–2
- Manni Schmidt – guitars, on tracks 3–14
- Chris Ephthimiadis – drums, on tracks 3–14
- Sven Fischer – guitars, on track 15
- Spiros Efthimiadis – guitars, on track 15
- Chris Ephthimiadis – drums, on track 15

=== Production ===
- Sven Conquest – producer, engineer, mixing
- Armin Sabol – producer
