= Darkness Turns to Light =

Darkness Turns to Light may refer to:

- "Darkness Turns to Light", the theme song for the series Beyblade Burst QuadStrike by Our Last Night
- "Darkness Turns to Light", a song by Rage from Unity
