= LMO (album) =

Studio album by Lingua Mortis Orchestra featuring Rage
- Released: 2 August 2013 (EU); 5 August 2013 (US)
- Recorded: Twilight Hall Studio in Krefeld, Germany
- Genre: Symphonic metal, power metal, heavy metal
- Length: 65:42
- Label: Nuclear Blast
- Producer: Charlie Bauerfeind, Victor Smolski

Lingua Mortis Orchestra chronology
Speak of the Dead (2006)	LMO (2013)

Rage chronology
21 (2012)	LMO (2013)	The Devil Strikes Again (2016)

Singles from LMO
- 1. "Cleansed by Fire" Released: 2 July 2013

LMO is the debut album by Lingua Mortis Orchestra in collaboration with heavy metal band Rage, released on 2 August 2013 through Nuclear Blast Records. The production was helmed by Charlie Bauerfeind.

== Album information ==
The album was composed by Victor Smolski and Peter "Peavy" Wagner, who cooperated with two orchestras from Spain and Belarus, enlarging the number of this project's participants to more than 100. Together with longtime co-producer Charlie Bauerfeind, was produced and mixed the record in Twilight Hall Studio in Krefeld, Germany. LMO follows the concept of the burning of witches in Gelnhausen in 1599 and was written by vocalist Peter Wagner based on a true story. The cover artwork was created by Felipe Machado Franco who had also been responsible for the latest Rage artwork, 21. The band photos were shot by Pia Kintrup.

== Track listing ==
All lyrics are written by Peavy Wagner; all music is composed by Victor Smolski, except where noted.

No.	Title	Length
1.	"Cleansed by Fire": I. "Convert the Pagans, Pt. 1"; II. "The Inquisition" (Instrumental); III. "Convert the Pagans, Pt. 2"	10:38: 5:50; 3:04; 1:44
2.	"Scapegoat"	7:07
3.	"The Devil's Bride" (Wagner, Smolski)	6:11
4.	"Lament"	6:21
5.	"Oremus" (Instrumental)	2:18
6.	"Witches' Judge"	6:15
7.	"Eye for an Eye" (Wagner, Smolski)	9:49
8.	"Afterglow"	6:03
9.	"Straight to Hell" (bonus track)	4:06
10.	"One More Time" (bonus track)	6:51
Total length:		65:42

=== Bonus DVD track listing ===
Live at Rock Hard Festival 2010
No.	Title	Length
1.	"Empty Hollow I: Empty Hollow"	6:04
2.	"Morituri te Salutant"	0:45
3.	"Prelude of Souls"	2:49
4.	"Innocent"	5:39
5.	"Depression"	1:05
6.	"No Regrets"	6:27
7.	"Higher Than The Sky"	5:22

Live at 70000 Tons of Metal 2013
No.	Title	Length
8.	"Interview"	8:02
9.	"Morituri te Salutant"	2:44
10.	"Prelude of Souls"	2:41
11.	"Innocent"	5:39
12.	"Depression"	1:16
13.	"No Regrets"	6:22
14.	"Confusion"	0:51
15.	"Black"	0:20

== Personnel ==
=== Band members ===
- Peavy Wagner – vocals, bass
- Victor Smolski – guitar
- André Hilgers – drums
- Jeannette Marchewka – Additional vocals
- Dana Harnge – Additional vocals

=== Additional musicians ===
- Henning Basse – backing vocals; guest vocals on "Scapegoat" and "Witches' Judge"

=== Production ===
- Charlie Bauerfeind – producer, engineering, mixing, mastering
- Victor Smolski – producer, mixing, mastering
