= Nuclear Blast All-Stars: Into the Light =

Into the Light

Studio album by Nuclear Blast All-Stars
- Released: May, 2007
- Genres: Heavy metal Power metal Thrash metal
- Label: Nuclear Blast
- Producer: Victor Smolski

Nuclear Blast All-Stars chronology
Into the Light (2007)	Out of the Dark (2007)

Into the Light is a compilation album from Nuclear Blast Records to commemorate their 20 years as a record label. Produced by Rage guitarist Victor Smolski, with singers Tobias Sammet (of Edguy), Peter "Peavy" Wagner (Rage) - who has also written the lyrics for all songs -, Tony Kakko (Sonata Arctica), Mats Levén (Therion), Marcel "Schmier" Schirmer (Destruction), Hansi Kürsch (Blind Guardian), Andi Deris (Helloween), Oddleif Stensland (Communic), Marko Hietala (ex-Nightwish, ex-Tarot), and Tarja Turunen (ex-Nightwish). It features a variable collection of "All Stars" much in the same vein as Roadrunner United. The whole album was written by Victor Smolski (however, two songs, "In the Picture" and "Slaves to the Desert" – originally "Slaves of the Desert" – are remakes of songs he had already recorded with Mind Odyssey), who also recorded all the guitars, some bass and keyboards. The drums were done by Volker Schultz and André Hilgers.

It was followed by a "twin" album called Out of the Dark. Into the Light focuses on the power metal side of Nuclear Blast, while Out of the Dark focuses on the melodic death metal side.

Tarja Turunen is the only singer in the album that is not (and wasn't at that time either) from Nuclear Blast. She is only included because of her past with Nightwish, one of the best-known bands from Nuclear Blast.

== Track listing ==
=== Disc 1 - 20 Years Nuclear Blast ===
All lyrics are written by Peter "Peavy" Wagner of Rage; all music is composed by Victor Smolski.

No.	Title	Length
1.	"Dirty Wings" (feat. Tobias Sammet of Edguy)	04:53
2.	"Terrified" (feat. Peter "Peavy" Wagner of RAGE)	04:01
3.	"Ruling the World" (feat. Tony Kakko of Sonata Arctica)	02:55
4.	"Death is Alive" (feat. Mats Leven of Therion, Krux, At Vance)	06:21
5.	"Bloodsucker" (feat. Marcel "Schmier" Schirmer of Destruction)	03:21
6.	"Slaves to the Desert" (feat. Hansi Kürsch of Blind Guardian)	06:49
7.	"A Perfect Day" (feat. Andi Deris of Helloween)	04:00
8.	"Eternally" (feat. Oddleif Stensland of Communic)	05:37
9.	"Inner Sanctuary" (feat. Marko Hietala (ex-Nightwish, ex-Tarot))	04:29
10.	"In the Picture" (feat. Tarja Turunen formerly of Nightwish)	07:28
Total length:		49:47

=== Disc 2 - 20 Years Nuclear Blast: Bonus CD ===
1. HammerFall - Hearts on Fire (03:54)
2. Helloween - The Madness of the Crowds (04:14)
3. Gotthard - El Traidor (03:36)
4. After Forever - Sweet Enclosure (05:05)
5. Ride the Sky - New Protection (03:23)
6. Thunderstone - Forevermore (04:21)
7. Threshold featuring Dan Swanö - Slipstream (04:55)
8. Amorphis - The Smoke (03:39)
9. Candlemass - Devil Seed (05:45)
10. Sirenia - The Other Side (03:55)

Total length: 42:43

== Personnel ==
- Victor Smolski - guitars, bass & keyboards
- Volker Schultz - drums
- André Hilgers - drums
