= Crawling Chaos =

Crawling Chaos may refer to:

- Nyarlathotep, an entity of H. P. Lovecraft's Cthulhu Mythos, also known as the Crawling Chaos
- "The Crawling Chaos", a story by H. P. Lovecraft (not featuring Nyarlathotep)
- "The Crawling Chaos", a song by German heavy metal band Rage from the album Black in Mind
