= Mind Odyssey =

German progressive metal band

- Origin: Berlin, Germany
- Genres: Progressive metal
- Years active: 1993–1999, 2007–present
- Label: Napalm Records
- Members: Mario LeMole; Victor Smolski; Dan Uhden
- Website: mindodyssey.de

Mind Odyssey is a German progressive metal band that formed in 1993, split in 1999 and re-formed in 2007.

== History ==
=== 1993–1999 ===
Mind Odyssey was founded in 1993 by singer and bassist, Mario LeMole, guitarist Dan Uhden, guitarist Rocco Stellmacher and drummer Volker Schultz. The first album Keep it All Turning was released in late 1993. Shortly after the release both guitarists left the band and were replaced by Victor Smolski. The next Album Schizophenia was released in the Summer of 1995. In 1996 Mario LeMole decided to focus more on his singing and hired bassist Jan Michael Keller and later keyboarder Andreas Dirksmeier. In late 1996, after playing various shows in Germany, the band went on a Europe Tour as support band for Vicious Rumors. The next album Nailed to the Shade was recorded in 1997 and released in 1998. The 4th album named Sings was recorded and released in 1999. Shortly after, guitarist Victor Smolski joined German power metal veterans Rage and the band split.

=== 2007–present ===
In 2007, after helping Victor Smolski with the Into the Light anniversary sampler for Nuclear Blast Records, Victor Smolski and Mario LeMole decided to bring Mind Odyssey back to live together with sound-engineer Charly Czajkowski. In January 2008 they signed a deal with Napalm Records. In March 2008 the best-of 15 Years was released. In July 2008 Czajkowski left and was replaced by Dan Uhden. In January 2009 the 5th album Time to Change it was released and the band went on tour as support band of Rage on their 25 anniversary tour.

== Band members ==
=== Current members ===
- Mario LeMole – Vocals (1993–1999, 2007–present), Bass guitar (1993–1996, 2007–present studio only)
- Victor Smolski – Keyboards, Guitar (1995–1999, 2007–present)
- Dan Uhden – Drums (2008–present studio-only), Guitar (1993–1994, 2008–present on tour)
- Jan-Michael Keller – Bass guitar (1996–1999, 2009 on tour)
- Andre Hilgers – Drums (2009 on tour)

=== Former members ===
- Volker Schultz – Drums (1993–1999)
- Andreas Dirksmeier – Keyboards (1996–1999)
- Rocco Stellmacher – Guitar (1993–1994)
- Charly Czajkowski – Drums (2007–2008)

== Discography ==
- Keep it all Turning (1993)
- Schizophenia (1995)
- Nailed to the Shade (1998)
- Signs (1999)
- 15 Years (best of) (2008)
- Time to Change it (2009)
