= Wild Seed =

Wild Seed may refer to:

- Wild Seed (novel), a 1980 science fiction novel by Octavia E. Butler
- Wild Seed (album), a 1995 album by Norwegian singer Morten Harket
- Wild Seed (film), a 1965 film starring Michael Parks and Celia Kaye
- "Wild Seed", a track from the Rage album Reflections of a Shadow
