= Resurrection Day =

Resurrection Day may refer to:

- Resurrection Day (novel), a 1999 novel by Brendan DuBois
- Resurrection Day (album), a 2021 album by Rage
- Easter
