= Charlie Bauerfeind =

German sound engineer and producer

- Born: Karl Rudolf Bauerfeind; 30 May 1963 (age 62); Erlangen, Germany
- Genres: Heavy metal, power metal
- Occupations: Musician, record producer, sound engineer
- Years active: 1988–present

Karl Rudolf "Charlie" Bauerfeind (born 30 May 1963) is a German sound engineer and record producer who has worked mostly with power metal bands such as Angra, Blind Guardian, Helloween, Primal Fear, Rage, HammerFall and Saxon.

== Career highlights ==
Since 1989, Bauerfeind has been active as a producer and engineer, working in studios worldwide. He is best known for his collaborations with bands such as:

- Angra: Produced albums including Angels Cry (1993) and Holy Land (1996
- Blind Guardian: Worked on Nightfall in Middle-Earth (1998) and A Night at the Opera (2002
- Helloween: Contributed to multiple albums, notably The Dark Ride (2000) and Rabbit Don't Come Easy (2003).

His extensive discography also includes collaborations with HammerFall, Gamma Ray, Rage, Saxon, and many others.

== Works ==
=== Production ===
==== Angra ====
- Angels Cry – 1993
- Holy Land – 1995/1996
- Freedom Call – 1996

==== Blind Guardian ====
- Nightfall in Middle-Earth – 1997/1998 (mixing of "Mirror Mirror" track, various recordings)
- A Night at the Opera – 2000/2001
- A Twist in the Myth – 2006
- At the Edge of Time – 2010
- Beyond the Red Mirror – 2015

==== Freedom Call ====
- Stairway to Fairyland – 1999
- Crystal Empire – 2001
- Eternity – 2002 (mixing)

==== Gamma Ray ====
- Insanity and Genius – 1993 (mixing)
- Land of the Free – 1994/1995
- Somewhere Out in Space – 1997 (mixing)

==== Gotthard ====
- Bang! 2014

==== HammerFall ====
- Crimson Thunder – 2002
- Chapter V: Unbent, Unbowed, Unbroken – 2005
- Threshold – 2006
- No Sacrifice, No Victory – 2009

==== Helloween ====
- The Dark Ride – 2000
- Treasure Chest – 2002
- Rabbit Don't Come Easy – 2003
- Keeper of the Seven Keys: The Legacy – 2005
- Gambling with the Devil – 2007
- Unarmed – Best of 25th Anniversary – 2009
- 7 Sinners – 2010
- Straight Out of Hell – 2013
- My God-Given Right – 2015
- Helloween – 2021
- Giants & Monsters - 2025

==== Joacim Cans ====
- Beyond the Gates – 2004

==== Molly Hatchet ====
- Silent Reign of Heroes – 1998 (mixing)

==== Rage ====
- Unity – 2002
- Soundchaser – 2003
- Speak of the Dead – 2006 (mixing)
- Carved in Stone – 2008 (mixing)
- Strings to a Web – 2010
- 21 – 2012

==== Saxon ====
- Metalhead – 1999
- Lionheart – 2004
- The Inner Sanctum – 2007
- Into the Labyrinth – 2009

==== ShadowIcon ====
- Empire in Ruins – 2011
- Smoke and Mirrors – 2014

==== Tamas ====
- The Dreamlake – 1994

==== Van Canto ====
- Hero (2008)
- Tribe of Force (2010)
- Dawn of the Brave (2014)

==== Viper ====
- Evolution – 1992
- Vipera Sapiens – 1992
