= Soundchaser =

- Cover art by Joachim Luetke

Studio album by Rage
- Released: 7 October 2003
- Recorded: April–May 2003
- Studios: VPS Studios, Hamm, Germany
- Genres: Power metal, Heavy metal, Thrash Metal
- Length: 53:20
- Label: SPV/Steamhammer
- Producers: Rage, Charlie Bauerfeind

Rage chronology
| Unity (2002) | Soundchaser (2003) | Speak of the Dead (2006) |

Soundchaser is the 17th studio album by the German heavy metal band Rage, released in 2003 by SPV/Steamhammer.

This concept album features a science fiction/horror story about the Soundchaser, Rage's mascot. A biomechanoid creature, crafted by the elders to serve as a sentinel, it has turned into a monster, attacking anything that makes a sound.

== Track listing ==
| No. | Title | Lyrics | Music | Length |
|---|---|---|---|---|
| 1. | "Orgy of Destruction" | | Mike Terrana, Victor Smolski | 1:26 |
| 2. | "War of Worlds" | Peavy Wagner | Smolski | 6:07 |
| 3. | "Great Old Ones" | Wagner | Wagner | 4:03 |
| 4. | "Soundchaser" | Wagner | Smolski | 5:37 |
| 5. | "Defenders of the Ancient Life" | Wagner | Wagner | 4:05 |
| 6. | "Secrets in a Weird World" | Wagner | Smolski | 5:28 |
| 7. | "Flesh and Blood" | Wagner | Smolski | 5:13 |
| 8. | "Human Metal" | Wagner | Smolski | 5:27 |
| 9. | "See You in Heaven or Hell" | Wagner | Wagner | 4:00 |
| 10. | "Falling from Grace, Pt. 1: Wake the Nightmares" | Wagner | Wagner | 4:59 |
| 11. | "Falling from Grace, Pt. 2: Death Is on Its Way" | Wagner | Wagner | 6:55 |
| Total length: | | | | 53:20 |

Limited edition digi-pack bonus track
| No. | Title | Lyrics | Music | Length |
|---|---|---|---|---|
| 12. | "French Bourrée" | Wagner | Johann Sebastian Bach, arr. Smolski | 4:11 |

Japanese edition bonus track
| No. | Title | Music | Length |
|---|---|---|---|
| 12. | "Fugue No. 5 in D major (from The Well-Tempered Clavier Book II)" (Instrumental) | Johann Sebastian Bach, arr. Smolski | 3:18 |

== Personnel ==
Band members

- Peavy Wagner - vocals, bass guitar
- Victor Smolski - guitars, piano, keyboards, sitar, orchestral arrangements
- Mike Terrana - drums

Additional musicians

- Andi Deris - vocals on "Wake the Nightmares"
- Thomas Hackmann - backing vocals

Production

- Charlie Bauerfeind - producer, mixing, mastering
- Ingo 'Charly' Czajkowski - engineer
- Jan Rubach - additional digital editing
