= Metal Meets Classic Live =

Video by Rage & Lingua Mortis Orchestra
- Released: 19 November 2001 (DVD)
- Recorded: in E-Werk, Cologne, Germany, 7 May 1998
- Genre: Heavy metal, symphonic metal, speed metal
- Length: DVD: 88:08; CD: 44:35
- Label: GUN Records/Sony Music Entertainment Germany
- Producer: Christian Wolff

Rage chronology
The Video Link (1994)	Metal Meets Classic Live (2001)	From the Cradle to the Stage (2004)

Metal Meets Classic Live + All G.U.N. Bonustracks is a live concert recording by German heavy metal band Rage, released as a DVD in November 2001 under name Rage & Lingua Mortis Orchestra.

The DVD was released in 2001 by GUN Records without asking the band for permission. It contains a concert from 7 May 1998 in E-Werk in Cologne. That gig was recorded by the German TV station WDR for their Rockpalast show.

Although the DVD carries a "full live show" label on the front cover, it contains only 74 of the 113 recorded minutes. However, some rare audio material was added to the audio side of this DVD.

== Track listing ==
=== DVD ===
Recorded live at E-Werk, Cologne, Germany.

No.	Title	Lyrics	Length
1.	"Overture" (instrumental)		2:30
2.	"From the Cradle to the Grave"	Spiros Efthimiadis, Peavy Wagner	4:52
3.	"Alive but Dead"	Chris Efthimiadis, Wagner	6:39
4.	"Turn the Page"	Wagner	4:50
5.	"All This Time"	Wagner	6:30
6.	"In a Nameless Time"	S. Efthimiadis, C. Efthimiadis, Sven Fischer, Wagner	11:00
7.	"Just Alone"	S. Efthimiadis, Wagner	9:04
8.	"Immortal Sin"	Wagner	6:56
9.	"Paint It, Black" (The Rolling Stones cover)	Mick Jagger, Keith Richards	5:15
10.	"Medley" (contains parts from: "Don't Fear the Winter", "Black in Mind", "Firestorm", "Sent by the Devil", "Lost in the Ice")	S. Efthimiadis, C. Efthimiadis, Peter Wagner	15:25
11.	"Deep in the Blackest Hole" (video clip)	S. Efthimiadis, Wagner	3:52
12.	"From the Cradle to the Grave" (video clip)	S. Efthimiadis, Wagner	6:48
13.	"Alive but Dead" (video clip)	C. Efthimiadis, Wagner	4:27
Total length:			88:08

=== All G.U.N. Bonustracks CD track listing ===
No.	Title	Lyrics	Length
1.	"Chase"	Wagner	3:51
2.	"Tie the Rope"	S. Efthimiadis, Wagner	3:47
3.	"Forgive But Don't Forget"	S. Efthimiadis, Wagner	4:27
4.	"How We Treat Each Other"	Wagner	3:54
5.	"The Sleep"	Wagner	3:56
6.	"The Trooper" (Iron Maiden cover)	Steve Harris	4:00
7.	"Tom Sawyer" (Rush cover; demo version)	Geddy Lee, Neil Peart, Alex Lifeson, Pye Dubois	4:21
8.	"End of Eternity"	Wagner	4:21
9.	"Don't Fear the Winter" (2001 re-recorded version)	Wagner	3:46
10.	"Yesterday" (The Beatles cover; acoustic)	John Lennon, Paul McCartney	2:33
11.	"Motorbreath" (Metallica cover; live)	James Hetfield	3:13
12.	"Jawbreaker" (Judas Priest cover)	K. K. Downing, Rob Halford, Glenn Tipton	3:26
Total length:			45:35

== Personnel ==
=== Band members ===
- Peavy Wagner – vocals, bass
- Spiros Efthimiadis – guitars
- Sven Fischer – guitars
- Chris Efthimiadis – drums

=== Additional musicians ===
- Lingua Mortis Orchestra

=== Production ===
- Christian Wolff – producer
