= Beyond the Wall (EP) =

EP by Rage
- Released: 26 October 1992
- Recorded: 1992
- Genre: Power metal, heavy metal
- Length: 27:51; 36:19 (with bonus tracks)
- Label: Noise Records
- Producer: Sven Conquest, Peter "Peavy" Wagner

Rage chronology
Trapped! (1992)	Beyond the Wall (1992)	The Missing Link (1993)

Beyond the Wall is an EP by the German heavy metal band Rage, released in 1992. The songs "Bury All Life" and "I Want You" were taken for bonus tracks for the Trapped!'s 2002 remaster, and the songs "On the Edge", "Dust" and "The Body Talks" for Execution Guaranteed's 2002 remaster.

AllMusic noted about the EP, "Boasting six tracks, most of which measure up with many of those heard on the aforementioned album, it's almost surprising the band didn't just save them for their next LP."

== Track listing ==
No.	Title	Length
1.	"Bury All Life"	5:35
2.	"On the Edge"	4:15
3.	"I Want You"	3:42
4.	"(Those, Who Got) Nothing to Lose"	4:16
5.	"Last Goodbye"	4:23
6.	"Light into the Darkness" (Acoustic)	5:40

Japanese version bonus tracks
No.	Title	Length
7.	"Dust" (Acoustic)	4:24
8.	"Beyond the Wall of Sleep"	4:04

== Personnel ==
=== Band members ===
- Peavy Wagner – vocals, bass, arrangements
- Manni Schmidt – guitars
- Chris Ephthimiadis – drums
