= Depraved to Black =

EP by Avenger
- Released: August 1985
- Venue: Metropol, Aachen, early 1985
- Studio: Studio Wahn, Bochum, late 1985
- Genre: Speed metal
- Length: 17:21
- Label: Wishbone
- Producer: Ferdinand Köther

Avenger chronology
Prayers of Steel (1985)	Depraved to Black (1985)	Reign of Fear (1986)

Depraved to Black is an EP released by German heavy metal band Avenger in 1985, before they changed their name to Rage.

== Track listing ==
No.	Title	Length
1.	"Down to the Bone"	5:01
2.	"Depraved to Black"	4:37
3.	"Prayers of Steel" (live)	4:56
4.	"Faster Than Hell" (live)	2:47

== Credits ==
- Peavy Wagner – vocals, bass guitar
- Jochen Schroeder – guitars
- Alf Meyerratken – guitars
- Jörg Michael – drums
