= Strings to a Web =

Studio album by Rage
- Released: 5 February 2010
- Recorded: Twilight Hall Studios, Grefrath, Germany, August–September 2009
- Genres: Power metal, heavy metal, symphonic metal, Thrash Metal, Progressive Metal
- Length: 54:47
- Label: Nuclear Blast
- Producers: Victor Smolski, Charlie Bauerfeind

Rage chronology
Carved in Stone (2008)	Strings to a Web (2010)	21 (2012)

Singles from Strings to a Web
- 1. "Into the Light" / "Purified" Released: 15 January 2010

Professional ratings
Review scores
Source	Rating
AllMusic	2/5 stars
Metal Storm	7.5/10

Strings to a Web is the 20th studio album by German heavy metal band Rage, released in Europe on 5 February 2010 through Nuclear Blast Records. The American and Japanese editions of the album were released in a special two-disc set, which included a DVD with live performances and videos.

== Track listing ==
All tracks are written by Victor Smolski and Peavy Wagner, except where indicated.

No.	Title	Length
1.	"The Edge of Darkness"	4:30
2.	"Hunter and Prey"	4:31
3.	"Into the Light"	4:22
4.	"The Beggar's Last Dime"	5:40

Empty Hollow (16:16)
No.	Title	Writer(s)	Length
5.	"Empty Hollow"		6:20
6.	"Strings to a Web"	Smolski	3:54
7.	"Fatal Grace"	Smolski	1:20
8.	"Connected"		2:54
9.	"Empty Hollow (Reprise)"		1:48

No.	Title	Writer(s)	Length
10.	"Saviour of the Dead"		5:44
11.	"Hellgirl"		4:11
12.	"Purified"	Wagner	3:46
13.	"Through Ages"		2:06
14.	"Tomorrow Never Comes"		3:41

== Bonus DVD ==
Live at Wacken Open Air 2009
No.	Title	Length
1.	"Carved in Stone"
2.	"Higher than the Sky"
3.	"Set This World on Fire" (Featuring Hansi Kürsch)
4.	"All I Want" (Featuring Hansi Kürsch)
5.	"Invisible Horizons" (Featuring Hansi Kürsch)
6.	"Lord of the Flies" (Featuring Jen Majura)
7.	"From the Cradle to the Grave" (Featuring Jen Majura)
8.	"Prayers of Steel" (Featuring Schmier)
9.	"Suicide" (Featuring Schmier)
10.	"Down" (Featuring Schmier)
11.	"Soundchaser"

Live at the Masters of Rock 2009
No.	Title	Length
12.	"Set This World on Fire"
13.	"All I Want"

Live in Sofia 2009
No.	Title	Length
14.	"Carved in Stone"

Rage Race 2009
No.	Title	Length
15.	"Never Give Up"

== Personnel ==
=== Band members ===
- Peavy Wagner – vocals, bass
- Victor Smolski – guitars, keyboards, cello, producer, mixing, mastering, orchestral arrangements
- André Hilgers – drums

=== Additional musicians ===
- Lingua Mortis Orchestra
- Hansi Kürsch, Jen Majura, Thomas Hackmann – backing vocals
- Samantha Pearl Hilgers – vocal screams on "Hellgirl"

=== Production ===
- Charlie Bauerfeind – producer, engineer, mixing, mastering
- Thomas geiger – additional digital editing
