= Wings of Rage =

Studio album by Rage
- Released: 10 January 2020
- Recorded: 2019
- Genre: Power metal; heavy metal; thrash metal
- Length: 54:36
- Label: SPV/Steamhammer
- Producer: Rage

Rage chronology
Seasons of the Black (2017)	Wings of Rage (2020)	Resurrection Day (2021)

Singles from Wings of Rage
- 1. "Let Them Rest in Peace" Released: 18 October 2019; 2. "True" Released: 15 November 2019; 3. "Chasing the Twilight Zone" Released: 13 December 2019

Professional ratings
Review scores
Source	Rating
BraveWords	8.5/10
Metal Gods TV	10/10
Metalitalia.com	7.5/10
Sonic Perspectives	8.5/10

Wings of Rage is the 24th studio album by German heavy metal band Rage, released on 10 January 2020 through SPV/Steamhammer. This is the last Rage album to feature guitarist Marcos Rodriguez, as he left the band in May 2020 for personal reasons. Videos were made for the singles "Let Them Rest in Peace" and "True".

== Track listing ==
All lyrics are written by Peavy Wagner; all music is composed by Wagner and Rodriguez, except where noted

No.	Title	Lyrics	Music	Length
1.	"True"			5:01
2.	"Let Them Rest in Peace"			4:30
3.	"Chasing the Twilight Zone"			4:30
4.	"Tomorrow"			5:02
5.	"Wings of Rage"			4:30
6.	"Shadow over Deadland (The Twilight Transition)"	Instrumental		0:35
7.	"A Nameless Grave"			5:59
8.	"Don't Let Me Down"			4:56
9.	"Shine a Light"			6:43
10.	"HTTS 2.0"		Wagner	3:28
11.	"Blame It on the Truth"			3:54
12.	"For Those Who Wish to Die"			5:28
Total length:				54:36

== Personnel ==
- Peavy Wagner – vocals, bass
- Marcos Rodriguez - guitar, backing vocals
- Vassilios "Lucky" Maniatopoulos - drums, backing vocals
