= Seasons of the Black =

Studio album by Rage
- Released: 28 July 2017
- Recorded: at Soundchaser Studios in Zandhoven, Belgium and Megafon Studios in Burscheid, Germany by Marcos & Brat.
- Genre: Power metal, heavy metal, thrash metal
- Length: 51:46 (76:07 with bonus tracks)
- Label: Nuclear Blast
- Producer: Rage

Rage chronology
The Devil Strikes Again (2016)	Seasons of the Black (2017)	Wings of Rage (2020)

Singles from Seasons of the Black
- 1. "Blackened Karma" Released: 26 May 2017

Seasons of the Black is the 23rd studio album by German heavy metal band Rage, released on 28 July 2017 through Nuclear Blast Records. Videos were made for the singles "Blackened Karma" and "Seasons of the Black". A bonus disc, Avenger Revisted, is a collection of re-recording songs from Prayers of Steel, Rage's first album under the name "Avenger".

== Track listing ==
All lyrics are written by Peavy Wagner; all music is composed by Wagner and Rodriguez, except where noted.

No.	Title	Length
1.	"Season of the Black"	4:55
2.	"Serpents in Disguise"	4:13
3.	"Blackened Karma"	4:38
4.	"Time Will Tell"	5:04
5.	"Septic Bite"	4:20
6.	"Walk Among the Dead"	4:05
7.	"All We Know Is Not"	4:20
8.	"Gaia" (The Tragedy of Man Pt. 1)	1:02
9.	"Justify" (The Tragedy of Man Pt. 2)	6:09
10.	"Bloodshed in Paradise" (The Tragedy of Man Pt. 3)	5:39
11.	"Farewell" (The Tragedy of Man Pt. 4)	7:21
Total length:		51:46

=== Bonus CD - Avenger Revisited ===
No.	Title	Music	Length
1.	"Adoration"	Peavy Wagner, Jochen Schroeder	3:32
2.	"Southcross Union"	Wagner, Schroeder	3:43
3.	"Assorted by Satan"	Wagner, Alf Meyerratken, Schroeder	4:22
4.	"Faster Than Hell"	Wagner, Schroeder	3:16
5.	"Sword Made of Steel"	Wagner, Meyerratken, Schroeder	5:16
6.	"Down to the Bone"	Wagner, Schroeder	4:12
Total length:			24:21

== Personnel ==
- Peavy Wagner – vocals, bass
- Marcos Rodriguez - guitar, backing vocals
- Vassilios "Lucky" Maniatopoulos - drums, backing vocals
