= Prayers of Steel =

Studio album by Avenger
- Released: May 1985
- Recorded: October 1984
- Studio: Studio Wahn, Bochum, Germany
- Genre: Speed metal, heavy metal
- Length: 42:30
- Label: Wishbone
- Producer: Ferdinand Köther

Avenger chronology
| Prayers of Steel (1985) | Depraved to Black (1985) |

Professional ratings
Review scores
| Source | Rating |
|---|---|
| Collector's Guide to Heavy Metal | 8/10 |

Prayers of Steel is the debut full-length album released by the German heavy metal band Avenger in 1985, before they changed their name to Rage. The only other release that followed under the name Avenger was the EP Depraved to Black (also 1985). German label GUN Records reissued the album on CD in 1995, including the track of the EP.

The opening track "Battlefield" was later re-recorded as a humoristic song called Bottlefield in the Extended Power EP, while the title track "Prayers of Steel" was re-recorded for 10 Years in Rage. Other songs from this album were later re-recorded for Rage's Seasons of the Black album in 2017.

== Track listing ==
Side one
| No. | Title | Writer(s) | Length |
|---|---|---|---|
| 1. | "Battlefield" | Peter Wagner, Jochen Schroeder | 2:44 |
| 2. | "South Cross Union" | Wagner, Schroeder | 3:33 |
| 3. | "Prayers of Steel" | Wagner, Schroeder, Alf Meyerratken | 6:10 |
| 4. | "Halloween" | Wagner | 3:49 |
| 5. | "Faster Than Hell" | Wagner, Schroeder | 3:16 |
| Total length: | | | 53:20 |

Side two
| No. | Title | Writer(s) | Length |
|---|---|---|---|
| 1. | "Adoration" | Wagner, Schroeder | 3:28 |
| 2. | "Rise of the Creature" | Schroeder, Meyerratken | 5:23 |
| 3. | "Sword Made of Steel" | Wagner, Schroeder, Meyerratken | 5:02 |
| 4. | "Bloodlust" | Wagner, Schroeder | 4:47 |
| 5. | "Assorted by Satan" | Wagner, Schroeder, Meyerratken | 4:04 |
| Total length: | | | 53:20 |

== Personnel ==
- Peavy Wagner – vocals, bass guitar
- Jochen Schroeder – guitars
- Alf Meyerratken – guitars
- Jörg Michael – drums

Production

- Ferdinand Köther – producer
- Ralph Hubert – engineer
- Ulli Schnarre – tape operator and mixing
