= Speak of the Dead =

Studio album by Rage
- Released: 24 March 2006
- Recorded: VPS Studios, Hamm, Germany, October–November 2005
- Genre: Power metal, progressive metal, symphonic metal, heavy metal, thrash metal
- Length: 62:49
- Label: Nuclear Blast
- Producer: Rage & Charly Czajkowski

Rage chronology
Soundchaser (2003)	Speak of the Dead (2006)	Full Moon in St. Petersburg (2007)

Singles from Speak of the Dead
- 1. "Full Moon" Released: 1 June 2006

Professional ratings
Review scores
Source	Rating
AllMusic	3.5/5 stars

Speak of the Dead is the 18th studio album by German heavy metal band Rage, released in 2006 by Nuclear Blast. The album contains a mix of different music genres, adding symphonic and progressive influences to their usual fast power metal/melodic thrash metal. The band go back to the album Lingua Mortis' themes and atmospheres in the suite that opens the album, called "Suite Lingua Mortis" that consists in eight parts, using a full symphonic orchestra recorded in Minsk, Belarus. The album marked the last featuring drummer Mike Terrana.

== Track listing ==
No.	Title	Lyrics	Music	Length
1.	"Morituri Te Salutant" (Instrumental)		Victor Smolski	0:57
2.	"Prelude of Souls" (Instrumental)		Smolski	2:46
3.	"Innocent"	Peavy Wagner	Smolski	5:36
4.	"Depression" (Instrumental)		Smolski	1:12
5.	"No Regrets"	Wagner	Smolski	4:52
6.	"Confusion" (Instrumental)		Smolski	1:45
7.	"Black" (Instrumental)		Smolski	0:51
8.	"Beauty"	Wagner	Smolski	3:53
9.	"No Fear"	Wagner	Smolski	5:31
10.	"Soul Survivor"	Wagner	Wagner	3:41
11.	"Full Moon"	Wagner	Wagner	4:53
12.	"Kill Your Gods"	Wagner	Smolski	5:13
13.	"Turn My World Around"	Wagner	Wagner	3:58
14.	"Be with Me or Be Gone"	Wagner	Wagner	3:47
15.	"Speak of the Dead"	Wagner	Wagner	4:06
Total length:				62:49

Latin America edition
No.	Title	Lyrics	Music	Length
16.	"La Luna Reine" (Spanish version of "Full Moon")	Wagner	Wagner	4:52

German edition
No.	Title	Lyrics	Music	Length
16.	"Vollmond" (German version of "Full Moon")	Wagner	Wagner	4:54

Russian edition
No.	Title	Lyrics	Music	Length
16.	"Полнолуние" (Russian version of "Full Moon")	Wagner	Wagner	4:52

Japanese edition
No.	Title	Lyrics	Music	Length
16.	"Michi-Shi Tsuki" (Japanese version of "Full Moon")	Wagner	Wagner	4:52

== Personnel ==
=== Band members ===
- Peavy Wagner – vocals, bass
- Victor Smolski – guitars, piano, keyboards, cello, orchestral arrangements
- Mike Terrana – drums and percussion

=== Additional musicians ===
- Inspector Symphonic Orchestra conducted by Andrey Zubrich
- Thomas Hackmann – backing vocals

=== Production ===
- Ingo 'Charly' Czajkowski – producer, engineer
- Charlie Bauerfeind – mixing, mastering
- Jan Rubach – additional digital editing
