= 10 Years in Rage =

10 Years in Rage: The Anniversary Album

Studio album by Rage
- Released: 28 September 1994
- Recorded: R.A.S.H. Studio and T&T Studio, Gelsenkirchen, June–July 1994
- Genres: Power metal, heavy metal, speed metal
- Length: 51:05
- Label: Noise
- Producer: Sven Conquest

Rage chronology
| Refuge (1994) | 10 Years in Rage: The Anniversary Album (1994) | Black in Mind (1995) |

Professional ratings
Review scores
| Source | Rating |
|---|---|
| AllMusic | 2.5/5 stars |
| Kerrang! | 2/5 stars |

10 Years in Rage: The Anniversary Album is the ninth full-length album released by the German heavy metal band Rage in 1994. It contains new material and previously unreleased tracks from the band's long career, as well the re-recording of "Prayers of Steel", from Avenger's first album and a medley of Rage's fan favourite tunes. The album features guest appearances from all the musicians that had played in Rage. The album was remastered by Noise/Sanctuary in 2002 with five bonus tracks.

== Track listing ==
| No. | Title | Writer(s) | Length |
|---|---|---|---|
| 1. | "Vertigo" | Peter "Peavy" Wagner | 3:34 |
| 2. | "She Killed and Smiled" | Wagner | 4:03 |
| 3. | "Destination Day" | Wagner | 5:08 |
| 4. | "Take My Blood" | Chris Efthimiadis, Spiros Efthimiadis, Wagner | 4:16 |
| 5. | "No Sign of Life" | Wagner | 7:27 |
| 6. | "Submission" | Wagner | 3:50 |
| 7. | "The Unknown" | S. Efthimiadis, Wagner | 4:44 |
| 8. | "Dangerous Heritage" | C. Efthimiadis, S. Efthimiadis, Wagner | 4:09 |
| 9. | "Prayers of Steel '94" | Wagner | 6:08 |
| 10. | "The Blow in a Row" (Consists of parts from the songs: "Execution Guaranteed", "Suicide", "Down by Law", "Don't Fear the Winter", "Invisible Horizons", "Waiting for the Moon", "Enough is Enough", "Solitary Man" and "Nevermore") | Wagner | 7:46 |

Remastered CD edition bonus tracks
| No. | Title | Length |
|---|---|---|
| 11. | "Brainsucker" | 1:29 |
| 12. | "On the Edge" (live) | 4:23 |
| 13. | "Solitary Man" (live) | 3:35 |
| 14. | "Enough Is Enough" (live) | 4:28 |
| 15. | "From the Underworld" (live, previously unreleased) | 3:22 |

== Personnel ==
Band members

- Peavy Wagner – vocals, bass, arrangements
- Sven Fischer – guitars
- Spiros Efthimiadis – guitars
- Chris Efthimiadis – drums

Additional musicians

- Jochen Schroeder, Rudy Graf, Manni Schmidt, Thomas Grüning, Alf Meyerratken – guitars on "Prayers of Steel '94"
- Efthimios Efthimiadis – buzuki
- Jörg Michael – drums on "Prayers of Steel '94"

Production

- Sven Conquest – producer, engineer, mixing
- Eberhard Köhler – mastering
- Karl-Ulrich Walterbach – executive producer
