= Resurrection Day (album) =

Studio album by Rage
- Released: 17 September 2021
- Recorded: March–May 2021
- Studio: Dynamita (Lugones); JB (Duisburg)
- Genre: Power metal; heavy metal; thrash metal
- Length: 50:02
- Label: SPV/Steamhammer
- Producer: Rage

Rage chronology
Wings of Rage (2020)	Resurrection Day (2021)	Afterlifelines (2024)

Singles from Resurrection Day
- 1. "Virginity" Released: 16 July 2021; 2. "Monetary Gods" Released: 27 August 2021; 3. "Arrogance and Ignorance" Released: 22 October 2021

Resurrection Day is the 25th studio album by German heavy metal band Rage, released on 17 September 2021 through SPV/Steamhammer. It marks the first Rage album with a new line-up featuring two guitarists, Jean Bormann and Stefan Weber, making it the band's first album as a quartet since Ghosts. Videos were made for the singles "Virginity" and "Monetary Gods".

== Track listing ==
No.	Title	Lyrics	Music	Length
1.	"Memento Vitae (Overture)"	Instrumental	Peavy Wagner	1:14
2.	"Resurrection Day"	Wagner	Wagner, Jean Bormann	4:18
3.	"Virginity"	Wagner	Wagner, Bormann, Stefan Weber	3:41
4.	"A New Land"	Wagner	Wagner, Bormann	3:49
5.	"Arrogance and Ignorance"	Wagner	Wagner, Bormann	5:00
6.	"Man in Chains"	Wagner	Wagner, Bormann, Vassilios "Lucky" Maniatopoulos	4:36
7.	"The Age of Reason"	Wagner	Wagner, Bormann, Weber	4:22
8.	"Monetary Gods"	Wagner	Wagner, Bormann	3:54
9.	"Mind Control"	Wagner	Wagner, Bormann	4:14
10.	"Traveling Through Time"	Wagner	Wagner, Bormann	4:13
11.	"Black Room"	Wagner	Wagner, Weber	4:49
12.	"Extinction Overkill"	Wagner	Wagner, Bormann, Weber, Maniatopoulos	5:52
Total length:				50:02

== Personnel ==
- Peavy Wagner – vocals, bass
- Jean Bormann - guitars, backing vocals
- Stefan Weber - guitars
- Vassilios "Lucky" Maniatopoulos - drums, backing vocals
