= Trapped! (album) =

Studio album by Rage
- Released: 1 April 1992
- Recorded: February–March 1992
- Studio: Nahrávací Studio, Prague; Powerplay Studio, Berlin
- Genre: Power metal, heavy metal, speed metal
- Length: 65:20
- Label: Noise
- Producer: Sven Conquest, Peter Wagner

Rage chronology
Extended Power (1991)	Trapped! (1992)	The Missing Link (1993)

Professional ratings
Review scores
Source	Rating
AllMusic	4/5 stars
The Collector's Guide to Heavy Metal	8/10

Trapped! is the seventh studio album by German heavy metal band Rage. The album was remastered by Noise/Sanctuary in 2002 with five bonus tracks, two of which are from the EP Beyond the Wall.

== Track listing ==
All tracks are written by Peter Wagner, except where indicated

No.	Title	Writer(s)	Length
1.	"Shame on You"	Peter Wagner, Manni Schmidt	4:50
2.	"Solitary Man"	Wagner, Schmidt	3:38
3.	"Enough Is Enough"	Wagner, Schmidt	6:44
4.	"Medicine"		3:44
5.	"Questions"		3:56
6.	"Take Me to the Water"		6:01
7.	"Power and Greed"	Wagner, Schmidt	4:26
8.	"The Body Talks"		4:35
9.	"Not Forever"		3:37
10.	"Beyond the Wall of Sleep"		4:04
11.	"Baby, I'm Your Nightmare"		5:23
12.	"Fast as a Shark" (Accept cover)	Wolf Hoffmann, Udo Dirkschneider, Stefan Kaufmann, Peter Baltes	3:03
13.	"Difference"		4:57

Remastered CD edition bonus tracks
No.	Title	Writer(s)	Length
14.	"Innocent Guilty"		2:50
15.	"Marching Heroes – The Wooden Cross"		3:14
16.	"Bury All Life"	Wagner, Schmidt, Chris Efthimiadis	5:33
17.	"I Want You"	Wagner, Schmidt, Efthimiadis	3:40
18.	"Questions" (Demo Version)		4:37

== Personnel ==
Band members

- Peavy Wagner – vocals, bass, co-producer
- Manni Schmidt – guitars
- Chris Efthimiadis – drums

Production

- Sven Conquest – producer, engineer, string arrangements
- Ralf Krause – engineer, mixing
- Tom Morris – mixing
- Mike Fuller – mastering
- Karl-Ulrich Walterbach – executive producer
