= Welcome to the Other Side =

Studio album by Rage
- Released: 26 February 2001
- Genres: Power metal, heavy metal, Thrash Metal, Groove Metal
- Length: 64:39
- Label: GUN Records/Victor Entertainment
- Producers: Rage, Charly Czajkowski, Hans Jörg Maucksch

Rage chronology
Ghosts (1999)	Welcome to the Other Side (2001)	Unity (2002)

Welcome to the Other Side is the 15th studio album by the German heavy metal band Rage. It was released in February 2001 by GUN Records. It is considered a concept album revolving around "the journey of a soul after death". It's the first album composed with Smolski and Terrana, who joined the band during the last album cycle, Ghosts, when the album itself was already composed by the previous lineup and in recording stage.

"Straight to Hell" has been featured in the 2001 German Western parody film Der Schuh des Manitu.

== Track listing ==
All lyrics are written by Peavy Wagner.

No.	Title	Music	Length
1.	"Trauma" (instrumental; intro)	Victor Smolski	0:50
2.	"Paint the Devil on the Wall"	Smolski	5:07
3.	"The Mirror in Your Eyes"	Wagner	3:44
4.	"Tribute to Dishonour, Pt. 1: R.I.P."	Smolski	2:13
5.	"Tribute to Dishonour, Pt. 2: One More Time"	Smolski	5:45
6.	"Tribute to Dishonour, Pt. 3: Requiem" (instrumental)	Smolski	1:16
7.	"Tribute to Dishonour, Pt. 4: I'm Crucified"	Smolski	5:38
8.	"No Lies"	Wagner, Smolski	3:10
9.	"Point of No Return"	Wagner, Smolski	5:18
10.	"Leave It All Behind"	Wagner	4:49
11.	"Deep in the Night"	Wagner	4:07
12.	"Welcome to the Other Side"	Wagner	4:23
13.	"Lunatic" (instrumental)	Smolski	0:51
14.	"Riders on the Moonlight"	Wagner	4:12
15.	"Straight to Hell"	Smolski	4:31
16.	"After the End"	Smolski	4:46
17.	"Sister Demon"	Wagner, Mike Terrana, Smolski	3:59
Total length:			64:39

Japanese edition bonus track
No.	Title	Writer(s)	Length
18.	"Don't Fear the Winter" (2001 re-recorded version)	Wagner	3:46

== Personnel ==
=== Band members ===
- Peavy Wagner – vocals, bass
- Victor Smolski – guitars, setar, piano, keyboards, cello, orchestral arrangements
- Mike Terrana – drums

=== Production ===
- Peavy Wagner, Victor Smolski, Mike Terrana – producers
- Charly Czajkowski – engineering, mixing
- Hans Jörg Maucksch – mastering
- Peter Dell – artwork, design
