= The Devil Strikes Again =

Studio album by Rage
- Released: 10 June 2016
- Recorded: at Megafon Studios in Burscheid, Germany and at Soundchaser Studios in Zandhoven, Belgium
- Genres: Power metal, heavy metal, Thrash metal, Groove Metal
- Length: 45:57 (73:10 with bonus tracks)
- Label: Nuclear Blast
- Producer: Marcos Rodriguez

Rage chronology
LMO (2013)	The Devil Strikes Again (2016)	Seasons of the Black (2017)

Professional ratings
Review scores
Source	Rating
The Metalist	positive
Stormbringer	4/5 stars
Rock 'n' Reel Reviews	4/5 stars

The Devil Strikes Again is the 22nd studio album by German heavy metal band Rage, released on 10 June 2016 through Nuclear Blast Records. Videos are made for the singles "My Way" and "The Devil Strikes Again".

== Track listing ==
All lyrics are written by Peavy Wagner; all music is composed by Wagner and Rodriguez, except where noted.

No.	Title	Length
1.	"The Devil Strikes Again"	4:37
2.	"My Way"	4:19
3.	"Back on Track"	4:19
4.	"The Final Curtain"	4:12
5.	"War"	4:21
6.	"Ocean Full of Tears"	4:02
7.	"Deaf, Dumb and Blind"	4:14
8.	"Spirits of the Night"	4:54
9.	"Times of Darkness"	5:13
10.	"The Dark Side of the Sun"	5:46
Total length:		45:57

Limited edition bonus tracks
No.	Title	Writer(s)	Length
1.	"Bring Me Down"		5:05
2.	"Requiem"		3:55
3.	"Into the Fire"		5:27
4.	"Slave to the Grind" (Skid Row cover)	Dave Sabo, Rachel Bolan, Sebastian Bach	3:27
5.	"Bravado" (Rush cover)	Alex Lifeson, Geddy Lee	4:37
6.	"Open Fire" (Y&T cover)	Dave Meniketti, Joey Alves, Phil Kennemore, Leonard Haze	4:42
Total length:			27:13

=== Bonus CD - Live in Warsaw ===
Recorded live at Progresja, Warsaw, Poland, 16 February 2016.

No.	Title	Length
1.	"Black in Mind"	04:59
2.	"Sent by the Devil"	06:10
3.	"End of All Days"	05:03
4.	"Back in Time"	05:28
5.	"Down"	05:47
6.	"My Way"	05:18
7.	"Until I Die"	05:44
8.	"Don't Fear the Winter"	04:55
9.	"Higher than the Sky"	10:35
Total length:		53:59

== Personnel ==
- Peavy Wagner – vocals, bass
- Marcos Rodriguez - guitar, backing vocals
- Vassilios "Lucky" Maniatopoulos - drums, backing vocals
