= E-Werk (Cologne) =

Concert venue in Cologne, Germany

Coordinates: 50.9696°N 7.01641°E

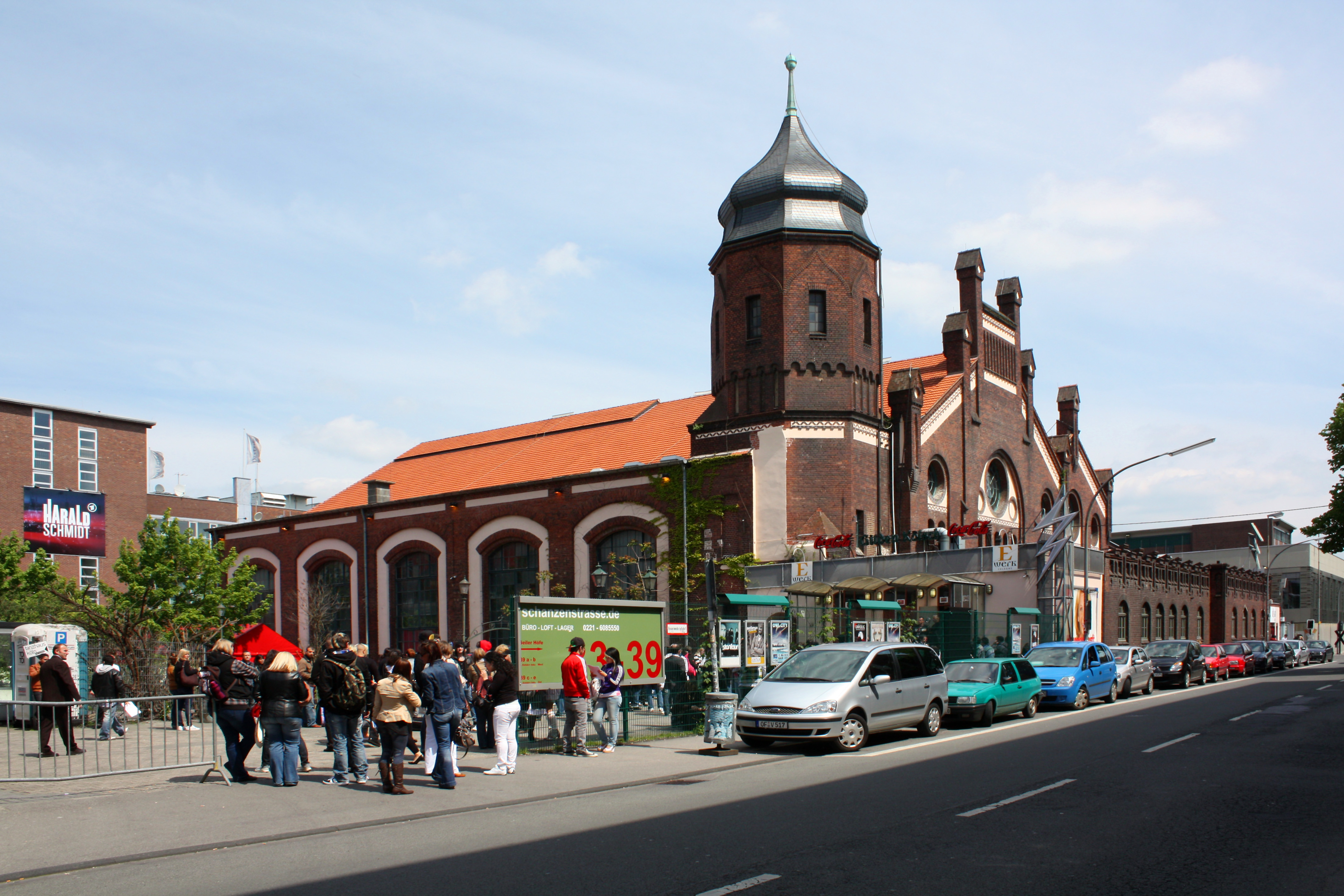
E-Werk

E-Werk logo

E-Werk is a live music venue located in Cologne, Germany. Opened in 1991, the building was a former power station built in the style of historicism. E-Werk has hosted artists such as Iggy Pop, Def Leppard, Beady Eye, Meat Loaf, Foreigner, Europe, Huey Lewis and the News, Status Quo, Guano Apes, Black Sabbath, Alice in Chains, AJR, Red Hot Chili Peppers, Erasure, Coldplay and Ellie Goulding.
