= Lingua Mortis =

Studio album by Rage and Prague Symphony Orchestra
- Released: 15 April 1996
- Recorded: R.A.S.H. Studio, Gelsenkirchen, Germany; Fisyo-Studio, Prague, Czech Republic; January–February 1996
- Genre: Symphonic metal, power metal
- Length: 43:01
- Label: GUN
- Producer: Ulli Pösselt, Peavy Wagner, Christian Wolff

Rage chronology
Black in Mind (1995)	Lingua Mortis (1996)	End of All Days (1996)

Rage with Lingua Mortis Orchestra chronology
Lingua Mortis (1996)	XIII (1998)

Lingua Mortis is the eleventh full-length album by the German heavy metal band Rage, released in 1996. It's the band's first collaboration with the Prague Symphony Orchestra, which played with the band Rage's songs re-arranged for a classic orchestra. The album consists of re-recorded songs from the previous album, Black in Mind and an epic medley of songs from recent albums to that time. A pioneering work in its own right, it's the first german metal album entirely recorded with an orchestra, and was one of the contributors to the gain of popularity of symphonic metal in the late 90's. The Lingua Mortis Orchestra ended up collaborating with the band several times in the following years.

== Track listing ==
All lyrics are written by Peavy Wagner.

No.	Title	Music	Length
1.	"In a Nameless Time"	Wagner, Spiros Efthimiadis, Chris Efthimiadis, Sven Fischer	11:21
2.	"Alive but Dead"	Wagner, C. Efthimiadis	5:57
3.	"Lingua Mortis Medley" (Consists of parts from the songs: "Don't Fear the Winter", "Black in Mind", "Firestorm", "Sent by the Devil", "Lost in the Ice")	Wagner, C. Efthimiadis, S. Efthimiadis	15:33
4.	"All This Time" (edited version)	Wagner	4:04
5.	"Alive but Dead" (instrumental orchestral version)	Wagner, C. Efthimiadis	6:06

== Personnel ==
Band members

- Peavy Wagner – vocals, bass
- Spiros Efthimiadis – guitars
- Sven Fischer – guitars
- Chris Efthimiadis – drums

Additional musicians

- Christian Wolff – piano
- Symphonic Orchestra of Prague conducted by Markus Stollenwerk

Production

- Ulli Pössell – producer, engineer, mixing
- Christian Wolff – producer, orchestral arrangements
- Peter Dell – cover art
