= Carved in Stone (Rage album) =

Studio album by Rage
- Released: 22 Feb 2008
- Recorded: VPS Studios, Hamm, Germany, August–October 2007
- Genre: Power metal, heavy metal
- Length: 47:49
- Label: Nuclear Blast
- Producer: Rage, Charly Czajkowski

Rage chronology
Full Moon in St. Petersburg (2007)	Carved in Stone (2008)	Strings to a Web (2009)

Professional ratings
Review scores
Source	Rating
Lords of Metal	(85/100)

Carved in Stone is the 19th studio album by the German heavy metal band Rage. The album includes a bonus DVD with their full show at Wacken Open Air in August 2007 (featuring a symphonic orchestra from Minsk, Belarus, which under the name Lingua Mortis Orchestra toured with Rage in Europe) plus the videos for the songs "Lord of the Flies" and "Open My Grave".

== Track listing ==
All lyrics are written by Peter "Peavy" Wagner; all music is composed by Victor Smolski, except where noted

No.	Title	Music	Length
1.	"Carved in Stone"		5:21
2.	"Drop Dead!"		4:13
3.	"Gentle Murders"		4:12
4.	"Open My Grave"		4:41
5.	"Without You"	Peter "Peavy" Wagner, Victor Smolski	5:45
6.	"Long Hard Road"	Wagner, Smolski	4:37
7.	"One Step Ahead"		5:05
8.	"Lost in the Void"	Wagner, Smolski	4:14
9.	"Mouth of Greed"	Wagner	3:56
10.	"Lord of the Flies"	Wagner, Smolski	5:45
Total length:			47:49

Bonus CD - Carved in Stone + Gib dich nie auf
No.	Title	Length
1.	"Gib dich nie auf"	2:59
2.	"Vollmond" (German version of "Full Moon")	4:54
3.	"Never Give Up"	4:07
4.	"Terrified"	4:01
5.	"Lord of the Flies" (Orchestral version)	5:51
6.	"Home"	3:14
Total length:		25:06

Bonus DVD - Live at Wacken 2007
No.	Title	Length
1.	"Overture"	1:58
2.	"From the Cradle to the Grave"	5:45
3.	"Alive but Dead"	7:40
4.	"Lingua Mortis Medley" ("Don't Fear the Winter", "Black in Mind", "Firestorm", "Sent by the Devil", "Lost in the Ice")	13:27
5.	"Turn the Page"	5:10
6.	"Morituri Te Salutant"	1:16
7.	"Prelude of Souls"	2:48
8.	"Innocent"	5:19
9.	"Depression"	0:57
10.	"No Regrets"	4:37
11.	"Confusion"	1:38
12.	"Black"	0:41
13.	"Beauty"	4:04
14.	"Higher Than the Sky"	8:54
15.	"Lord of the Flies" (Video Clip)	5:48
16.	"Open My Grave" (Video Clip)	4:42
Total length:		74:44

== Personnel ==
=== Band members ===
- Peavy Wagner - vocals, bass
- Victor Smolski - guitars, keyboards, sitar, orchestral arrangements, mixing, mastering
- André Hilgers - drums

=== Additional musicians ===
- Thomas Hackmann, Jen Majura - backing vocals

=== Production ===
- Ingo 'Charly' Czajkowski - producer, engineer
- Charlie Bauerfeind - mixing, mastering
- Thomas Geiger - additional digital editing
