= 21 (Rage album) =

Studio album by Rage
- Released: 24 February 2012
- Studio: Twilight Hall Studio
- Genre: Power metal, heavy metal, thrash metal
- Length: 58:06
- Label: Nuclear Blast
- Producer: Charlie Bauerfeind, Victor Smolski

Rage chronology
Strings to a Web (2010)	21 (2012)	LMO (2013)

Professional ratings
Review scores
Source	Rating
Peek from the Pit	8/10 stars
Metal-Temple	7/10 stars
Metal Underground	5/5 stars

21 is the 21st studio album by German heavy metal band Rage, released on 24 February 2012 through Nuclear Blast Records. The production was once again helmed by Charlie Bauerfeind, who had worked with the band for at least 10 years at that point.

== Track listing ==
No.	Title	Lyrics	Music	Length
1.	"House Wins" (Introduction)		Victor Smolski	1:30
2.	"Twenty One"	Peavy Wagner	Smolski	6:16
3.	"Forever Dead"	Wagner	Smolski	6:20
4.	"Feel My Pain"	Wagner	Smolski	5:40
5.	"Serial Killer"	Wagner	Smolski, Wagner	5:45
6.	"Psycho Terror"	Wagner	André Hilgers, Smolski	6:57
7.	"Destiny"	Wagner	Smolski, Wagner	5:15
8.	"Death Romantic"	Wagner	Smolski, Wagner	5:59
9.	"Black and White"	Wagner	Smolski, Wagner	5:19
10.	"Concrete Wall"	Wagner	Smolski, Wagner	3:50
11.	"Eternally"	Wagner	Smolski	5:10
Total length:				58:06

Enhanced part
No.	Title	Length
1.	"Rage Race 2011 Video" ("The Beggar's Last Dime" from Strings to a Web)	6:34

=== Bonus CD – Live in Tokyo ===
Recorded live at Shibuya O-East, Tokyo, 15–16 April 2010.

Live in Tokyo
No.	Title	Length
1.	"Opening"	1:16
2.	"The Edge of Darkness"	5:15
3.	"Hunter and Prey"	5:45
4.	"Into the Light"	5:42
5.	"Drop Dead!"	5:30
6.	"Empty Hollow I: Empty Hollow"	8:58
7.	"Light Into the Darkness"	5:03
8.	"Higher than the Sky"	6:20
9.	"War of Worlds"	8:19
10.	"Carved in Stone"	4:37
11.	"Soundchaser"	5:49
12.	"Down"	7:45
Total length:		70:21

== Personnel ==
=== Band members ===
- Peavy Wagner – vocals, bass
- Victor Smolski – guitar
- André Hilgers – drums

=== Additional musicians ===
- Hacky Hackmann – backing vocals

=== Production ===
- Charlie Bauerfeind – producer, engineering, mixing, mastering
- Victor Smolski – producer, mixing, mastering
- Heather Smith – engineering
- Thomas Geiger – additional digital editing
- Felipe Machado Franco – cover art, layout
- Pia Kintrup – photography
