= End of All Days =

Studio album by Rage
- Released: 9 September 1996
- Recorded: R.A.S.H. Studio, Gelsenkirchen, Germany, March–June 1996
- Genre: Power metal, heavy metal
- Length: 62:58
- Label: GUN
- Producer: Ulli Pössell, Peavy Wagner

Rage chronology
| Lingua Mortis (1996) | End of All Days (1996) | XIII (1998) |

Singles from End of All Days
- 1. "Higher than the Sky" Released: 23 October 1996

End of All Days is the twelfth studio album by the German heavy metal band Rage.

== Track listing ==
| No. | Title | Writer(s) | Length |
|---|---|---|---|
| 1. | "Under Control" | Spiros Efthimiadis, Christos Efthimiadis, Peavy Wagner | 4:07 |
| 2. | "Higher than the Sky" | Wagner | 4:17 |
| 3. | "Deep in the Blackest Hole" | S. Efthimiadis, Wagner | 4:23 |
| 4. | "End of All Days" | S. Efthimiadis, Wagner | 4:45 |
| 5. | "Visions" | Wagner | 4:17 |
| 6. | "Desperation" | Wagner | 4:55 |
| 7. | "Voice from the Vault" | S. Efthimiadis, C. Efthimiadis, Wagner | 5:36 |
| 8. | "Let the Night Begin" | Wagner | 3:53 |
| 9. | "Fortress" | Wagner | 3:56 |
| 10. | "Frozen Fire" | Wagner | 3:42 |
| 11. | "Talking to the Dead" | Wagner | 4:00 |
| 12. | "Face Behind the Mask" | S. Efthimiadis, Wagner | 3:37 |
| 13. | "Fading Hours" | Wagner | 6:28 |

CD edition bonus track
| No. | Title | Writer(s) | Length |
|---|---|---|---|
| 14. | "Silent Victory" | Wagner | 4:54 |

Japanese edition bonus tracks
| No. | Title | Writer(s) | Length |
|---|---|---|---|
| 15. | "How We Treat Each Other" | Sven Fischer, Wagner | 3:55 |
| 16. | "The Sleep" | Wagner | 3:57 |

German limited edition bonus tracks
| No. | Title | Writer(s) | Length |
|---|---|---|---|
| 15. | "The Sleep" | Wagner | 3:57 |
| 16. | "The Trooper" (Iron Maiden cover) | Steve Harris | 4:00 |

== Personnel ==
=== Band members ===
- Peavy Wagner – vocals, bass, arrangements, producer
- Sven Fischer – guitars, additional engineering
- Spiros Efthimiadis – guitars
- Chris Efthimiadis – drums

=== Additional musicians ===
- Christian Wolf – orchestration

=== Production ===
- Ulli Pössell – producer, engineer, mixing
- George Marino – mastering
