= Reign of Fear =

Studio album by Rage
- Released: 12 May 1986
- Recorded: February–March 1986
- Studio: Horus Sound Studio, Hanover, Germany
- Genre: Speed metal, thrash metal
- Length: 37:11
- Label: Noise
- Producer: Ralph Hubert

Rage chronology
Depraved to Black (1985)	Reign of Fear (1986)	Execution Guaranteed (1987)

Professional ratings
Review scores
Source	Rating
AllMusic	3/5 stars

Reign of Fear is the second full-length album by the German heavy metal band Rage, and the first since their renaming from Avenger to Rage. It was released in 1986. The album was remastered by Noise/Sanctuary in 2002 with slightly altered cover art, and five bonus tracks. The album was once again remastered in 2015 by the band's own label Dr. Bones for use on streaming services.

== Track listing ==
All tracks are written by Jochen Schroeder and Peter Wagner, except where indicated.

Side one
No.	Title	Writer(s)	Length
1.	"Scared to Death"		4:41
2.	"Deceiver"	Thomas Grüning, Wagner	3:36
3.	"Reign of Fear"		3:54
4.	"Hand of Glory"		3:26
5.	"Raw Energy"	Grüning, Wagner	3:27

Side two
No.	Title	Writer(s)	Length
6.	"Echoes of Evil"		4:48
7.	"Chaste Flesh"		4:52
8.	"Suicide"		4:04
9.	"Machinery"	Wagner	4:23

Remastered CD edition bonus tracks
No.	Title	Writer(s)	Length
10.	"The Scaffold"	Grüning, Schroeder, Wagner	9:16
11.	"Suicide" (live)		4:00
12.	"Refuge" (live)		4:03
13.	"Baby, I'm Your Nightmare" (live)		5:09
14.	"Light into the Darkness" (acoustic version)		5:38
15.	"Invisible Horizons" (acoustic version)		5:39

== Personnel ==
Rage

- Peavy Wagner – vocals, bass
- Jochen Schroeder – guitars
- Thomas Grüning – guitars
- Jörg Michael – drums

Production

- Ralph Hubert – producer
- Karl-Ulrich Walterbach – executive producer
- D.E.F. – engineer, sample sounds
- Phil Lawvere – cover painting
- Fred Baumgart – cover photo
