= XIII (Rage album) =

Studio album by Rage & the Lingua Mortis Orchestra
- Released: 23 March 1998
- Genre: Symphonic metal, heavy metal, power metal
- Length: 57:51
- Label: GUN
- Producer: Christian Wolff, Peavy Wagner

Rage chronology
End of All Days (1996)	XIII (1998)	The Best from the Noise Years (1998)

Singles from XIII
- 1. "From the Cradle to the Grave" Released: 1998; 2. "In Vain (I Won't Go Down)" Released: 1998

XIII is the 13th full-length album by the German heavy metal band Rage, and the second collaboration with the Lingua Mortis Orchestra. It was released in 1998.

== Reception ==
Professional ratings
Review scores
Source	Rating
Rock Hard	9.5/10

In 2005, XIII was ranked number 272 in Rock Hard magazine's book The 500 Greatest Rock & Metal Albums of All Time.

== Track listing ==
All lyrics are written by Peavy Wagner, except where noted.

No.	Title	Music	Length
1.	"Overture"	Christian Wolf	1:55
2.	"From the Cradle to the Grave"	Wagner, Spiros Efthimiadis	4:51
3.	"Days of December"	Wagner	4:35
4.	"Sign of Heaven"	Wagner	4:17
5.	"Incomplete"	Wagner, Wolf	5:10
6.	"Turn the Page"	Wagner	5:03
7.	"Heartblood"	Wagner, Chris Efthimiadis, S. Efthimiadis	6:21
8.	"Over and Over"	Wagner, S. Efthimiadis, Sven Fischer	3:48
9.	"In Vain (I Won't Go Down)"	Wagner, Wolf	5:19
10.	"Immortal Sin"	Wagner	5:28
11.	"Paint It Black" (The Rolling Stones cover)		4:34
12.	"Just Alone"	Wagner, S. Efthimiadis, Fischer	6:24
13.	"XIII"		0:05

=== Limited edition bonus tracks ===
No.	Title	Music	Length
14.	"Another Wasted Day"	Wagner, Fischer	4:56
15.	"Tom Sawyer" (Rush cover)	Lee, Lifeson	4:24

== Personnel ==
=== Band members ===
- Peavy Wagner – vocals, bass
- Spiros Efthimiadis – guitars
- Sven Fischer – guitars
- Chris Efthimiadis – drums

=== Additional musicians ===
- Christian Wolff – piano
- Lingua Mortis Orchestra

=== Production ===
- Christian Wolff – producer
- Ronald Prent – mixing, mastering
- Sander Van Der Heide – mastering
