= Black in Mind =

Studio album by Rage
- Released: 22 May 1995
- Recorded: R.A.S.H. Studio, Gelsenkirchen, October 1994 – January 1995
- Genres: Power metal, Speed metal, Thrash metal, Groove Metal
- Length: 68:33
- Label: GUN
- Producers: Ulli Pössell, Peavy Wagner

Rage chronology
| 10 Years in Rage (1994) | Black in Mind (1995) | Lingua Mortis (1996) |

Singles from Black in Mind
- 1. "The Crawling Chaos" Released: August 1995

Black in Mind is the tenth studio album by German heavy metal band Rage. Some tracks on the album such as "The Crawling Chaos" are inspired by the works of H. P. Lovecraft.

== Track listing ==
| No. | Title | Writer(s) | Length |
|---|---|---|---|
| 1. | "Black in Mind" | Spiros Efthimiadis, Chris Efthimiadis, Peavy Wagner | 4:08 |
| 2. | "The Crawling Chaos" | Wagner | 4:46 |
| 3. | "Alive but Dead" | C. Efthimiadis, Wagner | 4:57 |
| 4. | "Sent by the Devil" | Wagner | 5:00 |
| 5. | "Shadow Out of Time" | S. Efthimiadis, Wagner | 5:39 |
| 6. | "A Spider's Web" | S. Efthimiadis, Sven Fischer, Wagner | 3:22 |
| 7. | "In a Nameless Time" | S. Efthimiadis, C. Efthimiadis, Fischer, Wagner | 10:11 |
| 8. | "The Icecold Hand of Destiny" | S. Efthimiadis, Wagner | 4:06 |
| 9. | "Forever" | S. Efthimiadis, Wagner | 4:45 |
| 10. | "Until I Die" | Wagner | 4:34 |
| 11. | "My Rage" | Wagner | 2:42 |
| 12. | "The Price of War" | S. Efthimiadis, Wagner | 4:16 |
| 13. | "Start!" | S. Efthimiadis, Wagner | 4:33 |
| 14. | "All This Time" | Wagner | 5:34 |

German limited edition bonus tracks
| No. | Title | Writer(s) | Length |
|---|---|---|---|
| 15. | "Tie the Rope" | S. Efthimiadis, Wagner | 3:46 |
| 16. | "Forgive but Don't Forget" | S. Efthimiadis, Wagner | 4:29 |

== Personnel ==
Band members

- Peavy Wagner – vocals, bass, arrangements, producer
- Sven Fischer – guitars
- Spiros Efthimiadis – guitars
- Chris Efthimiadis – drums

Additional musicians

- Strings on "All this Time" conducted by Christian Wolff
- Benjamin Rinnert – violin on "In a Nameless Time"

Production

- Ulli Pössell – producer, engineer, mixing
- Christian Wolff – studio assistant
- Bernd Steinwedel – mastering
