= Victor Smolski =

Belarusian guitarist based in Germany

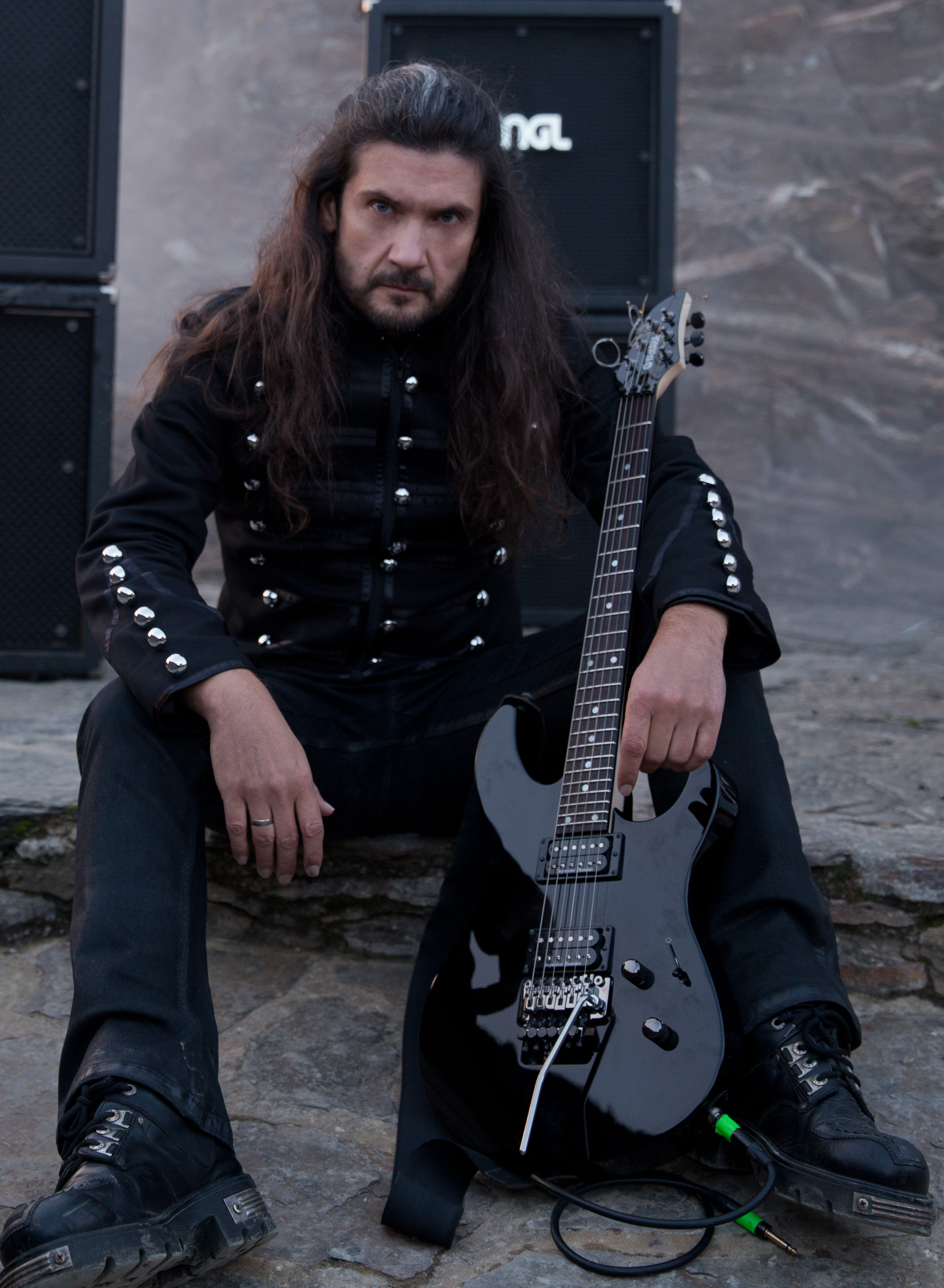

Background information
- Born: Виктор Дмитриевич Смольский; 1 February 1969 (age 57); Minsk, Soviet Union
- Genres: Heavy metal; power metal; progressive metal; speed metal
- Occupation: Musician
- Instrument: Guitar
- Years active: 1983–present
- Label: Nuclear Blast

Victor Dmitriyevich Smolski (Russian: Виктор Дмитриевич Смольский, Belarusian: Віктар Дзмітрыевіч Смольскі, born 1 February 1969) is a guitarist who was a member of the German heavy metal band Rage from 1999 until 2015, and a member of the metal bands Almanac, Mind Odyssey and Lingua Mortis Orchestra (LMO).

== Biography ==
The son of professor Dmitry Smolski, a symphonic music composer, Victor was six years old when he began studying the piano, cello and later guitar.

Smolski presented his symphonic metal band called Almanac in 2015. Their debut album, Tsar, was released on 18 March 2016.

== Discography ==
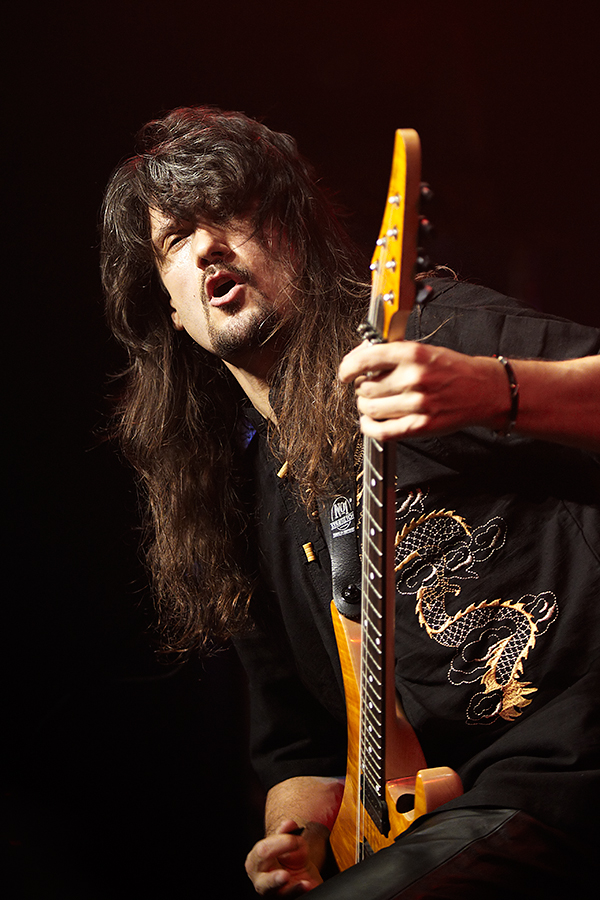
Smolski performing with Rage in 2010

=== Rage ===
- Ghosts (1999)
- Welcome to the Other Side (2001)
- Unity (2002)
- Soundchaser (2003)
- From the Cradle to the Stage (2004)
- Speak of the Dead (2006)
- Full Moon in St. Petersburg (2007)
- Carved in Stone (2008)
- Gib dich nie auf (Never Give Up) (2009)
- Strings to a Web (2010)
- 21 (2012)
- LMO (2013)

=== Solo ===
- Destiny (1996)
- The Heretic (2000)
- Majesty & Passion (2004)
- Guitar Force (2023)

=== Kipelov ===
- Reki Vremeon (2005)
- Live in Moskau (DVD) (2005)

=== Mind Odyssey ===
- Schizophenia (1995)
- Nailed to the Shade (1998)
- Signs (1999)
- Time to Change It (2009)

=== Nuclear Blast All-Stars ===
- Into the Light (2007)

=== Almanac ===
- Tsar (2016)
- Kingslayer (2017)
- Rush of Death (2020)

=== Voodoo Gods ===
- The Divinity of Blood (2020)

=== Others ===
- Inspector – Russian Prayer (1993)
- Der Schuh des Manitu (Movie) – "Soundtrack" (2001)
- Siggi Braun Fine Young Guitars – "Perfect Passion" (2004)
- Traumschiff Surprise (Movie) – "Soundtrack" (2004)
- Vindex – Power Forge (2005)

=== Producer and guest musician for ===
Lacrimosa, Mike Terrana, Der Bote, Vindex, Black Hole, Silent Force, Perzonal War, GB Arts, Seventh Avenue, Delirious, Avanitas, The Stokes, Point Whitmark, Adrian Weiss, Savn.
