= Perfect Man (Rage album) =

Studio album by Rage
- Released: 6 June 1988
- Recorded: February–March 1988
- Studio: Sky Trak Studios Berlin, Germany
- Genre: Speed metal, power metal
- Length: 43:46
- Label: Noise
- Producer: Armin Sabol

Rage chronology
| Execution Guaranteed (1987) | Perfect Man (1988) | Secrets in a Weird World (1989) |

Professional ratings
Review scores
| Source | Rating |
|---|---|
| AllMusic | 4.5/5 stars |
| Collector's Guide to Heavy Metal | 9/10 |

Perfect Man is the fourth full-length album released by German heavy metal band Rage in 1988. This album introduces the Refuge years line-up, with the new members Manni Schmidt and Chris Efthimiadis, and the band's mascot, the "Soundchaser", which would feature in most other Rage cover arts. The album was remastered by Noise/Sanctuary in 2002 with slightly altered cover art, and five bonus tracks.

== Track listing ==
All lyrics are written by Peter Wagner; all music is composed by Peter Wagner, except where noted

| No. | Title | Music | Length |
|---|---|---|---|
| 1. | "Wasteland" | | 3:26 |
| 2. | "In the Darkest Hour" | | 3:17 |
| 3. | "Animal Instinct" | Manni Schmidt, Wagner | 3:48 |
| 4. | "Perfect Man" | | 3:35 |
| 5. | "Sinister Thinking" | Schmidt, Wagner | 3:18 |
| 6. | "Supersonic Hydromatic" | Schmidt, Wagner | 3:34 |
| 7. | "Don't Fear the Winter" | | 3:27 |
| 8. | "Death in the Afternoon" | | 3:56 |
| 9. | "A Pilgrim's Path" | | 4:27 |
| 10. | "Time and Place" | Schmidt, Wagner | 4:15 |
| 11. | "Round Trip" | Schmidt, Wagner | 3:25 |
| 12. | "Between the Lines" | Schmidt, Wagner | 3:18 |

Remastered CD edition bonus tracks
| No. | Title | Music | Length |
|---|---|---|---|
| 13. | "Symbols of Our Fear" | | 3:36 |
| 14. | "Neurotic" | | 3:02 |
| 15. | "Shame on You" (Live; Originally released on Power of Metal in 1994) | Schmidt, Wagner | 4:30 |
| 16. | "Don't Fear the Winter" (Live; Originally released on Power of Metal in 1994) | | 3:56 |
| 17. | "Certain Days" (Live; Originally released on Power of Metal in 1994) | | 5:32 |
| 18. | "Last Goodbye" | | 4:22 |
| 19. | "Not Forever" (Previously Unreleased Acoustic Version) | | 4:06 |

== Personnel ==
Rage

- Peavy Wagner – vocals, bass
- Manni Schmidt – guitars
- Chris Efthimiadis – drums

Production

- Armin Sabol – producer, arrangements
- Rage – arrangements
- Will Reid-Dick – engineer, mixing
- Karl-Ulrich Walterbach – executive producer
