= Ghosts (Rage album) =

Studio album by Rage & the Lingua Mortis Orchestra
- Released: 4 October 1999
- Recorded: 1999
- Genre: Power metal, symphonic metal, heavy metal
- Length: 51:20
- Label: GUN Records
- Producer: Christian Wolff, Charly Czajkowski, Peavy Wagner, Victor Smolski

Rage chronology
The Best from the Noise Years (1998)	Ghosts (1999)	Welcome to the Other Side (2001)

Ghosts is the 14th full-length album by the German heavy metal band Rage with the Lingua Mortis Orchestra. It was released in 1999. Despite being composed with the same line-up as their three last studio albums, the musicians appearing inside the album lyrics leaflet are Victor Smolski and Mike Terrana, who joined the band when Fischer and the Efthimiadis brothers left during the recording. Smolski and Terrana became official members, joining Peavy Wagner for the tour following the release.

== Track listing ==
All lyrics are written by Peavy Wagner.

No.	Title	Music	Length
1.	"Beginning of the End"	Wagner, Christian Wolff	4:44
2.	"Back in Time"	Wagner, Wolff	4:20
3.	"Ghosts"	Wagner, Wolff, Spiros Efthimiadis	5:14
4.	"Wash My Sins Away"	Wagner	4:08
5.	"Fear"	Wagner, Wolff, S. Efthimiadis	5:08
6.	"Love and Fear Unite"	Wagner	3:37
7.	"Vanished in Haze"	Wagner	5:01
8.	"Spiritual Awakening"	Wagner	3:32
9.	"Love After Death"	Wagner, S. Efthimiadis	4:13
10.	"More Than a Lifetime"	Wagner	4:28
11.	"Tomorrow's Yesterday"	Wagner, Wolff, Sven Fischer	6:55
Total length:			51:20

Limited digipak edition
No.	Title	Music	Length
12.	"End of Eternity"	Wagner	4:21

Japanese edition
No.	Title	Music	Length
12.	"Six Feet Under Ground"	Wagner, S. Efthimiadis	3:17

== Personnel ==
=== Band members ===
- Peavy Wagner – vocals, bass, arrangements, producer
- Sven Fischer – guitars
- Spiros Efthimiadis – guitars
- Chris Efthimiadis – drums

=== Additional musicians ===
- Victor Smolski – additional guitars, producer, engineer
- Christian Wolff – piano, keyboards, producer, orchestral arrangements
- Lingua Mortis Orchestra

=== Production ===
- Charly Czajkowski – producer (additional), engineering (additional)
- Hans Jörg Maucksch – mastering
- Britta Kühlmann – engineering
- Jörg Umbreit – engineering, mixing
