= Extended Power =

EP by Rage
- Released: April 1991
- Recorded: January 1991
- Studio: Sky Trak Studios, Berlin
- Genre: Heavy metal, power metal
- Length: 19:43
- Label: Noise
- Producer: Armin Sabol

Rage chronology
Reflections of a Shadow (1990)	Extended Power (1991)	Trapped! (1992)

Professional ratings
Review scores
Source	Rating
AllMusic	1.5/5 stars

Extended Power is an EP by the German heavy metal band Rage, released in 1991. It contains a new song, leftovers of the writing sessions for previous albums and the remake of the song "Battlefield" from the first Avenger album Prayers of Steel (albeit with different lyrics, reflected by the name "Bottlefield").

== Track listing ==
All tracks are written by Peter "Peavy" Wagner, except where noted

No.	Title	Writer(s)	Length
1.	"Woman"		3:47
2.	"Ashes"		5:02
3.	"Bottlefield"	Jochen Schroeder, Peter "Peavy" Wagner	2:44
4.	"Waiting for the Moon"	Manni Schmidt, Wagner	4:40
5.	"What's Up?"	Schmidt, Wagner	3:30

== Personnel ==
Band members

- Peavy Wagner – lead and backing vocals, bass
- Manni Schmidt – electric and acoustic guitars, backing vocals
- Chris Ephthimiadis – drums

Production

- Armin Sabol – producer
- Sven Conquest – engineer
- Ralf Krause – engineer, mixing
- Karl-Ulrich Walterbach – executive producer
