= Execution Guaranteed =

Studio album by Rage
- Released: 11 May 1987
- Recorded: 1987
- Studios: Hartmann Digital Studios, Germany
- Genres: Speed metal; heavy metal; Thrash Metal
- Length: 45:46
- Label: Noise
- Producer: Rage

Rage chronology
| Reign of Fear (1986) | Execution Guaranteed (1987) | Perfect Man (1988) |

Professional ratings
Review scores
| Source | Rating |
|---|---|
| AllMusic | 1.5/5 stars |
| Collector's Guide to Heavy Metal | 7/10 |
| Metal Forces | 9.2/10 |

Execution Guaranteed is the third full-length album released by the heavy metal band Rage in 1987. The album was remastered by Noise/Sanctuary in 2002 with slightly altered cover art, and six bonus tracks. Rudy Graf had been a member of the German heavy metal band Warlock until 1985.

== Track listing ==
All tracks are written by Jochen Schroeder and Peter Wagner, except where indicated.

Side one
| No. | Title | Length |
|---|---|---|
| 1. | "Down by Law" | 3:23 |
| 2. | "Execution Guaranteed" | 6:49 |
| 3. | "Before the Storm (The Secret Affair)" | 4:49 |
| 4. | "Streetwolf" | 6:07 |

Side two
| No. | Title | Writer(s) | Length |
|---|---|---|---|
| 5. | "Deadly Error" | Wagner | 5:06 |
| 6. | "Hatred" | Wagner | 3:57 |
| 7. | "Grapes of Wrath" | | 5:12 |
| 8. | "Mental Decay" | | 5:53 |
| 9. | "When You're Dead" | Wagner | 4:30 |

Remastered CD edition bonus tracks
| No. | Title | Writer(s) | Length |
|---|---|---|---|
| 10. | "Down by Law" (Live) | | 3:37 |
| 11. | "Nevermore" (Live) | Wagner | 4:25 |
| 12. | "Firestorm" (Live) | Manni Schmidt, Wagner | 5:06 |
| 13. | "On the Edge" | Wagner | 4:13 |
| 14. | "Dust" (Acoustic Version) | | 4:15 |
| 15. | "The Body Talks" (Previously Unreleased Acoustic Version) | Wagner | 4:41 |

== Personnel ==
Rage

- Peavy Wagner – vocals, bass
- Jochen Schroeder – guitars
- Rudy Graf – guitars
- Jörg Michael – drums

Production

- Rage – producer
- Andi Musolf – engineer, mixing at Hartmann Digital Studios
- DEF – mixing, samples
- Tommy Hansen – remixing at Horus Sound Studio
