= Secrets in a Weird World =

Studio album by Rage
- Released: 25 August 1989
- Recorded: April–May 1989
- Studios: Sky Trak Studios, Berlin, Germany
- Genres: Speed metal; power metal; heavy metal
- Length: 46:30
- Label: Noise
- Producer: Armin Sabol

Rage chronology
Perfect Man (1988)	Secrets in a Weird World (1989)	Reflections of a Shadow (1990)

Singles from Secrets in a Weird World
- 1. "Invisible Horizons" Released: 11 August 1989

Professional ratings
Review scores
Source	Rating
AllMusic	2.5/5 stars
Collector's Guide to Heavy Metal	8/10

Secrets in a Weird World is the fifth full-length album by the German heavy metal band Rage. It was released in 1989. The album was remastered by Noise/Sanctuary in 2002 with slightly altered cover art, and five bonus tracks.

== Track listing ==
All tracks are written by Peter Wagner, except where indicated.

No.	Title	Writer(s)	Length
1.	"Intro (Opus 32 No. 3)"		0:52
2.	"Time Waits for Noone"	Manni Schmidt, Wagner	4:49
3.	"Make My Day"		3:37
4.	"The Inner Search"		4:41
5.	"Invisible Horizons"		4:35
6.	"She"	Schmidt, Wagner	5:20
7.	"Light into the Darkness"		4:50
8.	"Talk to Grandpa"		2:45
9.	"Distant Voices"	Schmidt, Wagner	5:48
10.	"Without a Trace"		9:13

Remastered CD edition bonus tracks
No.	Title	Writer(s)	Length
11.	"Lost Side of the World"		4:45
12.	"Law and Order"		3:04
13.	"Mirror"	Schmidt, Wagner	6:18
14.	"Invisible Horizons" (Live)		5:38
15.	"(Those Who Got) Nothing to Lose"		4:13
16.	"Shame on You" (Acoustic Version)	Schmidt, Wagner	4:47

== Personnel ==
Band members

- Peavy Wagner – vocals, bass
- Manni Schmidt – guitars
- Chris Ephthimiadis – drums

Additional musicians

- Gary Marlowe – keyboards

Production

- Armin Sabol – producer, arrangements, mixing
- Will Reid-Dick – engineer, mixing
- Rage – arrangements
- Karl-Ulrich Walterbach – executive producer
