= Reflections of a Shadow =

Studio album by Rage
- Released: 4 December 1990
- Recorded: July–September 1990
- Studio: Sky Trak Studios, Berlin
- Genre: Power metal; heavy metal; speed metal
- Length: 56:20
- Label: Noise
- Producer: Armin Sabol

Rage chronology
| Secrets in a Weird World (1989) | Reflections of a Shadow (1990) | Extended Power (1991) |

Professional ratings
Review scores
| Source | Rating |
|---|---|
| AllMusic | 2.5/5 stars |
| Collector's Guide to Heavy Metal | 8/10 |
| Kerrang! | 4/5 stars |

Reflections of a Shadow is the sixth full-length album by the German heavy metal band Rage. It was released in 1990. The album was remastered by Noise/Sanctuary in 2002 with slightly altered cover art, and five bonus tracks, largely taken from the EP Extended Power.

== Track listing ==
| No. | Title | Writer(s) | Length |
|---|---|---|---|
| 1. | "Introduction (A Bit More of Green)" | Peter Wagner | 1:33 |
| 2. | "That's Human Bondage" | Wagner | 4:26 |
| 3. | "True Face in Everyone" | Manni Schmidt, Wagner | 5:12 |
| 4. | "Flowers That Fade in My Hand" | Schmidt, Wagner | 7:40 |
| 5. | "Reflections of a Shadow" | Schmidt, Wagner | 3:53 |
| 6. | "Can't Get Out" | Wagner | 5:03 |
| 7. | "Waiting for the Moon" | Schmidt, Wagner | 4:40 |
| 8. | "Saddle the Wind" | Wagner | 4:06 |
| 9. | "Dust" | Wagner | 4:49 |
| 10. | "Nobody Knows" | Schmidt, Wagner | 3:50 |

Remastered CD edition bonus tracks
| No. | Title | Writer(s) | Length |
|---|---|---|---|
| 11. | "Faith" | Schmidt, Wagner | 5:42 |
| 12. | "Wild Seed" | Schmidt, Wagner | 5:26 |
| 13. | "Woman" | Wagner | 3:47 |
| 14. | "Ashes" | Wagner | 5:02 |
| 15. | "Bottlefield" | Jochen Schroeder, Wagner | 2:37 |
| 16. | "What's Up?" | Schmidt, Wagner | 3:36 |
| 17. | "Woman" (Acoustic Version) | Wagner | 4:44 |

== Personnel ==
Band members

- Peavy Wagner – lead and backing vocals, bass, classical guitar
- Manni Schmidt – electric and acoustic guitars, backing vocals
- Chris Ephthimiadis – drums

Additional musicians

- Ulli Köllner – keyboards, organ, backing vocals

Production

- Armin Sabol – producer, mixing at Sky Track Studios, Berlin
- Sven Conquest – engineer, mixing
- Ralf Krause – mixing
- Karl-Ulrich Walterbach – executive producer
- Peter Lohde – artwork
- John Scarpati – illustration
