= The Missing Link (Rage album) =

Studio album by Rage
- Released: 1 August 1993
- Recorded: May–June 1993
- Studios: Rocktech Studio, Berlin
- Genres: Power metal, heavy metal, speed metal, Thrash Metal, Groove Metal
- Length: 45:46
- Label: Noise
- Producer: Sven Conquest

Rage chronology
Beyond the Wall (1992)	The Missing Link (1993)	Refuge (1994)

Singles from The Missing Link
- 1. "Refuge" Released: 24 March 1994

Professional ratings
Review scores
Source	Rating
AllMusic	2.5/5 stars
Collector's Guide to Heavy Metal	8/10

The Missing Link is the eighth full-length album released by the heavy metal band Rage in 1993. The album was remastered by Noise/Sanctuary in 2002 with five bonus tracks, three of them are from the EP Refuge.

== Track listing ==
All tracks are written by Peter Wagner, except where indicated.

No.	Title	Writer(s)	Length
1.	"Firestorm"	Manni Schmidt, Peter Wagner	4:56
2.	"Nevermore"		4:28
3.	"Refuge"		3:38
4.	"The Pit and the Pendulum"	Chris Ephthimiadis, Wagner	4:18
5.	"From the Underworld"	Schmidt, Wagner	3:10
6.	"Certain Days"		5:46
7.	"Who Dares?"	Ephthimiadis, Wagner	4:29
8.	"Wake Me When I'm Dead"		5:22
9.	"Lost in the Ice"		9:50
10.	"Her Diary's Black Pages"		3:34
11.	"The Missing Link"	Ephthimiadis, Schmidt, Wagner	4:24
12.	"Raw Caress"		5:26

Remastered CD edition bonus tracks
No.	Title	Writer(s)	Length
13.	"Another Kind of Madness"		5:11
14.	"Truth Hits Everybody" (The Police cover)	Sting	2:26
15.	"I Can't Control Myself" (The Troggs cover)	Reg Presley	2:48
16.	"Beyond the Pale" (The Mission cover)	Craig Adams, Mick Brown, Simon Hinkler, Wayne Hussey	6:34
17.	"Paranoid" (Black Sabbath cover; Demo Version)	Geezer Butler, Tony Iommi, Ozzy Osbourne, Bill Ward	2:40

== Personnel ==
Band members

- Peavy Wagner – vocals, bass, arrangements
- Manni Schmidt – guitars
- Chris Ephthimiadis – drums

Production

- Sven Conquest – producer, engineer, mixing
- Bernd Steinwedel – mastering
- Karl-Ulrich Walterbach – executive producer
