= Rage (German band) =

German heavy metal band

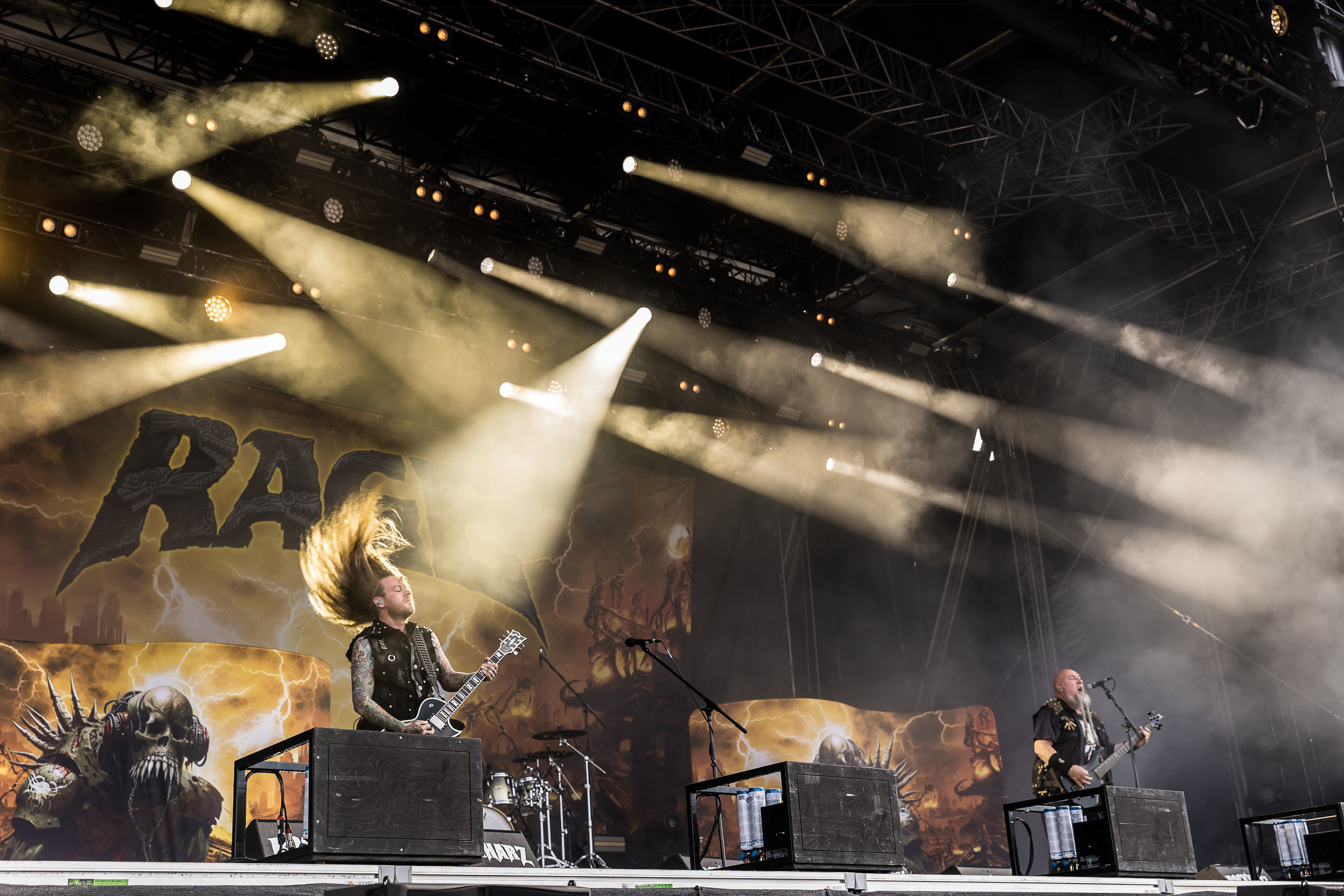
- Rage performing in 2024

Background information
- Also known as: Avenger (1984–1985)
- Origin: Herne, North Rhine-Westphalia, Germany
- Genres: Power metal; Heavy metal; Speed metal; Progressive metal; Thrash Metal; Symphonic metal
- Years active: 1984–present
- Labels: Noise; Nuclear Blast; SPV; GUN
- Spinoffs: Lingua Mortis Orchestra, Refuge
- Members: Peavy Wagner; Vassilios Maniatopoulos; Jean Bormann
- Website: rage-official.com

Rage is a German heavy metal band formed in 1984 by Peter "Peavy" Wagner. They were part of the German heavy/speed/power metal scene that emerged in the early to mid-1980s and are considered part of the scene's "big four," alongside Grave Digger, Helloween, and Running Wild.

Rage was formed in 1984 under the name Avenger. After releasing their debut album Prayers of Steel and the Depraved to Black EP in 1985, the band changed their name to Rage due to the existence of another band in England with the same name. Over the years, 17 musicians have been part of Rage, with the most successful lineup emerging during the period now known as the Refuge years, featuring Manni Schmidt and Chris Efthimiadis. The second notable lineup included Mike Terrana and Victor Smolski.

Throughout their career, Rage has established themselves as a notably successful band and a pioneer of the power metal scene, incorporating elements of progressive metal and classical music into their work. In 1996, Rage became one of the first metal bands to write and record an album featuring a full symphonic orchestra: Lingua Mortis.

As of 2025, Rage have released 27 main studio albums (not counting the "Refuge" and "LMO" side projects) over their 40-year career, totaling more than 50 releases when including DVDs, EPs, Japanese editions, and VHS. They have achieved international success, selling over five million records and earning more than 40 entries on music charts.

== History ==
=== From Avenger to Rage (1984–1986) ===
Rage began in 1984 in Herne when Peavy Wagner (bass and vocals), along with drummer Jörg Michael and guitarist Jochen Schroeder, formed a band under the name "Avenger." Following the release of their debut album, Prayers of Steel, recorded in 1984 and released by Wishbone Records, along with an EP titled Depraved to Black in August 1985, Avenger changed their name to Rage. They subsequently secured a record deal with Noise, releasing their first official LP, Reign of Fear, on 12 May 1986.

=== Noise years (1986–1994) ===
On 11 May 1987, they released the album Execution Guaranteed under the label Noise. That same year, they debuted their first official music video, "Down by Law," which introduced a new lineup featuring Manni Schmidt and Chris Efthimiadis.

With this lineup, the album Perfect Man was released in 1988, featuring the single "Don't Fear the Winter," which became a hit within the scene. The band began touring with notable acts such as Running Wild, U.D.O., Motörhead, and Saxon. In 1989, Rage released the album Secrets in a Weird World, which reached the charts with the single "Invisible Horizons," marking another highlight in the band’s career.

The early 1990s saw their 1992 album Trapped! mark their international breakthrough, charting worldwide and leading to the band's first major tour in Japan. Their success continued in 1993 with the release of The Missing Link, one of the most successful and influential releases of that era. The Video Link is a live concert video album released on VHS in January 1994 and on DVD in February 2003. The video contains shows that the band played in the Docks in Hamburg on 25 September 1993 as well as documentaries and "Behind the Scenes" during the songs.

In early 1994, guitarist Manni Schmidt left the band, prompting Peavy Wagner to form a new lineup with Sven Fischer and Chris Efthimiadis's brother, Spiros.

=== Two guitars years (1994–1999) ===
Following the lineup change, Rage recorded their ten-year anniversary album, 10 Years in Rage, in 1994. This was the last album released by Noise Records, but it suffered from inadequate media promotion. That same year, Rage signed with Gun Records and released the breakthrough album Black in Mind, which was followed by a world tour and several chart entries worldwide. Particularly in Japan and Europe, this album elevated the band to a much higher level and is still regarded as a classic of the genre. Several other bands also left Gun Records that year.

The album Lingua Mortis, recorded in 1996, was the first album by a metal act to collaborate with a classical symphonic orchestra. This material was performed live for the first time in late summer 1996 in Kufstein, Austria. Following this, Rage and the orchestra embarked on a Christmas tour and appeared at several European festivals.

Also in 1996, they released one of the most successful albums of their career, End of All Days, with the track "Higher than the Sky" becoming a staple of their live performances.

In March 1998, Rage released their thirteenth album, XIII, which featured the Lingua Mortis Orchestra and achieved considerable success on the charts. XIII was ranked number 272 in Rock Hard magazine's book The 500 Greatest Rock & Metal Albums of All Time.

After the release of XIII, Rage continued their collaboration with the Lingua Mortis Orchestra for their next album, Ghosts. Shortly before the album's release, the band underwent a significant lineup change, with Peavy Wagner reforming Rage while former members went on to form the pop band Sub7even.

=== The millennium years (1999–2015) ===
Peavy recruited new members Victor Smolski on guitar and Mike Terrana on drums. The trio first performed at Wacken Open Air in August 1999 and released their album Welcome to the Other Side in 2001. Over the next two years, they released the albums Unity and Soundchaser, both of which received positive reviews from critics. Rage toured with Primal Fear in 2002 and Helloween in 2003. The band's 20th anniversary in 2004 was celebrated with the From the Cradle to the Stage tour, during which the show in Bochum was recorded and released under the same name on CD and DVD in 2005.

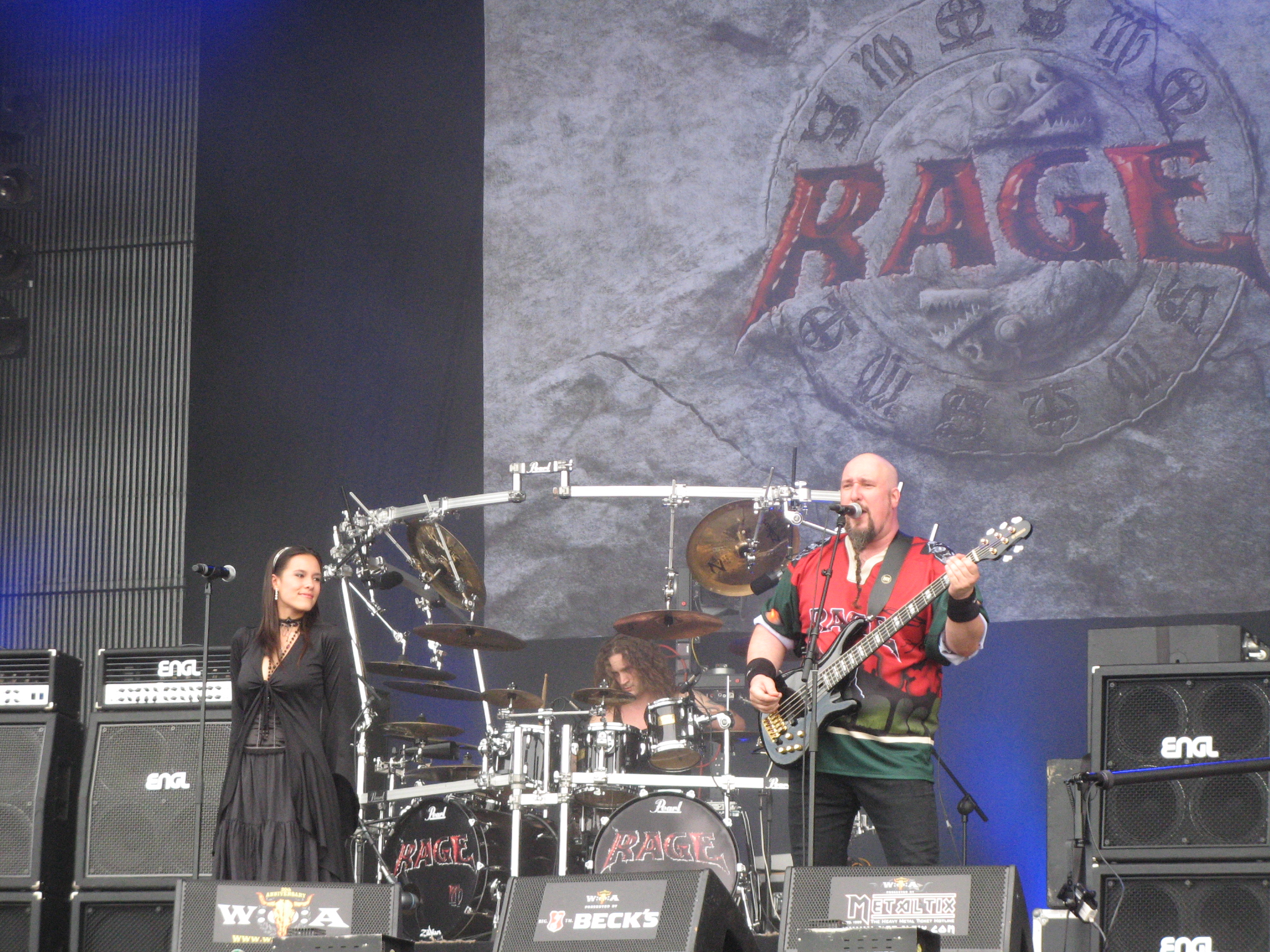
Rage at Wacken Open Air 2009

In 2006, Rage again featured a symphonic orchestra, this time from Minsk, Belarus, named the "Lingua Mortis Orchestra," which performed on their subsequent album Speak of the Dead. This was the last album to feature Mike Terrana on drums. On 1 January 2007, it was announced that the new drummer would be André Hilgers, formerly of Axxis. He had already contributed to the 20th anniversary album Into the Light, which was composed, produced, and primarily played by Victor, with lyrics written by Peavy.

In 2007, the band toured Europe with the orchestra, and their performance at Wacken Open Air in August, in front of 80,000 fans, was recorded for a DVD to be included as a bonus with their next album. Carved in Stone was released on 22 February 2008. In 2009, Rage performed at the Bundesvision Song Contest on 13 February, hosted by Stefan Raab (TV total), where they secured third place. Their participating song, Gib dich nie auf (Never Give Up), was released on an EP. The year also marked a 25th anniversary tour, and their performance at Wacken, featuring guest musicians like Hansi Kürsch, was released as a bonus DVD with the 2011 album Strings to a Web.

Rage entered the studio in October 2011 to begin recording their 21st album, aptly titled 21, scheduled for release in early 2012. Two years later, in celebration of the band's 30th anniversary, they released The Soundchaser Archives, featuring rare and demo tracks from the band's 30-year history. An anniversary tour took place throughout the year and concluded in January 2015 with their final show in Sofia.

On 4 February 2015, Peavy Wagner announced that there would be no further collaboration with Victor Smolski and André Hilgers.

Meanwhile, Peavy reestablished contact with former band members Manni Schmidt and Christos Efthimiadis and played a secret concert in Peavy's hometown of Herne under the pseudonym Tres Hombres. Following this successful performance, they decided to reunite as Refuge and confirmed several festival dates for 2015.

=== Present years (since 2015) ===
The new line-up was announced on 18 June 2015, featuring guitarist Marcos Rodriguez (from the band Soundchaser) and drummer Vassilios "Lucky" Maniatopoulos, who is also the vocalist and percussionist of the band Tri State Corner, as well as a former drum technician and apprentice of Chris Efthimiadis. Following the release of the EP My Way in January 2016, their album The Devil Strikes Again was released on 10 June 2016. A tour was scheduled for the end of the year, followed by the release of another album, Seasons of the Black, on 28 July 2017. The next tour took place in January 2018, featuring Firewind as a special guest.

The 25th studio album, Wings of Rage, was announced in April 2019 and released in January 2020. On 6 May 2020, Marcos Rodriguez left the band for personal reasons and was replaced by Stefan Weber (ex-Axxis) and Jean Bormann (Angelinc).

Rage's 26th studio album, Resurrection Day, was released on 17 September 2021. The band supported Saxon on their European tour in March 2023.On 24 July 2023, it was announced that Weber would go on indefinite hiatus due to personal issues, and the band would continue as a trio.

Rage's 27th studio album, Afterlifelines, was released on 29 March 2024, the year of the 40th anniversary of the band. This album marks the first double album in their history and the first collection of new symphonic songs since the departure of Smolski. The album consists of 21 new songs (the longest number of songs of any Rage album), some doing musical and lyrical nods to former eras of the band, and includes one of the longest Rage track ever (excluding the suites made of several separate songs), the track Lifelines, which has a duration of 9 minutes and 55 seconds (more than Scaffold and its 9 minutes and 13 seconds but less than In a Nameless Time which culminates at 10 minutes and 12 seconds).

Their 28th studio album, A New World Rising, was released in September 2025.

== Side projects ==
=== Lingua Mortis Orchestra ===
Lingua Mortis Orchestra
- Also known as: LMO
- Genres: Symphonic metal, heavy metal, power metal
- Years active: Since 1996
- Labels: Nuclear Blast, GUN
- Spinoff of: Rage
- Website: rage-official.com/lmo

The Lingua Mortis Orchestra (LMO) is the name associated with the orchestras that have performed with Rage since 1996, both in studio recordings and live performances. Rage's tenth studio album, Lingua Mortis, was the first classical album by a metal band and a collaboration with the Prague Symphony Orchestra. Subsequently, Rage worked with orchestras on some of the band's most renowned albums, including XIII and Ghosts. In 2006, an orchestra from Minsk, Belarus, also named Lingua Mortis Orchestra, collaborated with Rage on the album Speak of the Dead. The following year, Rage performed several shows with the Lingua Mortis Orchestra, and their performance at Wacken Open Air was recorded as a bonus DVD for their next album, Carved in Stone.

In 2011, the project was formalized by Rage musicians Peavy Wagner (vocals and bass), Victor Smolski (guitar and keyboard), and André Hilgers (drums) as a continuation of the 1996 album Lingua Mortis, which was a pioneering work in its own right. In 2013, they recorded the debut album, titled LMO, in collaboration with two orchestras from Spain and Belarus. The album features additional vocals by former Metalium frontman Henning Basse, Jeannette Marchewka, and Dana Harnge.

The first symphonic performances under the band's name took place at the 70000 Tons of Metal festival, followed by several summer festivals, including Wacken and—prior to the album's release—Masters of Rock. The latter performance was also recorded and included as a bonus DVD in The Soundchaser Archives.

At this point, the designation of Lingua Mortis Orchestra as a "side project" was dismissed by Peavy, and it became integrated into the band, mirroring its original formation in 1996. In 2019, Rage toured with the Lingua Mortis Orchestra to perform at various festivals, including a complete rendition of the XIII album. The 2024 release Afterlifelines also features symphonic tracks, and the band scheduled several performances with an orchestra as part of their 40th anniversary celebrations.

"Equals to Rage, LMO is an important part of me and I will put in the same amount of passion and creative energy as I have done in the past."

=== Refuge ===
Refuge
- Genres: Heavy metal, power metal, speed metal
- Years active: Since 2014
- Spinoff of: Rage
- Members: Peavy Wagner; Manni Schmidt; Chris Efthimiadis

In 2014, Peavy Wagner reunited with Manni Schmidt and Chris Efthimiadis, leading to the decision to perform a secret show in their hometown of Herne under the name "Tres Hombres." This event sparked the idea for the creation of Refuge, featuring the same Rage line-up from 1988 to 1993. The name Refuge was derived from one of Rage's most recognized songs, "Refuge," from the album The Missing Link, which was also recorded by this line-up. In an interview, Peavy noted that Refuge is not a professional band, as its members maintain regular jobs and families; thus, Refuge serves more as an "extended hobby" for performing at special events and festivals. He also stated that Refuge would coexist alongside Rage and the new line-up featuring Marcos and Vassilios.

In 2015, Refuge performed at numerous festivals across Europe, including the Rock Hard Festival, which was broadcast live and later recorded as the live album Live at Rock Hard Festival for the box set The Refuge Years.

The band's debut album, Solitary Men, was released on 8 June 2018.

== Band members ==
Current

- Peter "Peavy" Wagner — lead vocals, bass (since 1984)
- Vassilios "Lucky" Maniatopoulos — drums, backing vocals (since 2015)
- Jean Bormann — guitars, backing vocals (since 2020)

== Discography ==
=== Studio albums ===
- Prayers of Steel (as Avenger) (1985)
- Reign of Fear (1986)
- Execution Guaranteed (1987)
- Perfect Man (1988)
- Secrets in a Weird World (1989)
- Reflections of a Shadow (1990)
- Trapped! (1992)
- The Missing Link (1993)
- 10 Years in Rage (1994)
- Black in Mind (1995)
- Lingua Mortis (1996)
- End of All Days (1996)
- XIII (1998)
- Ghosts (1999)
- Welcome to the Other Side (2001)
- Unity (2002)
- Soundchaser (2003)
- Speak of the Dead (2006)
- Carved in Stone (2008)
- Strings to a Web (2010)
- 21 (2012)
- LMO (2013)
- The Devil Strikes Again (2016)
- Seasons of the Black (2017)
- Wings of Rage (2020)
- Resurrection Day (2021)
- Afterlifelines (2024)
- A New World Rising (2025)

=== EPs ===
- Depraved to Black (as Avenger) (1985)
- Invisible Horizons (1989)
- Extended Power (1991)
- Beyond the Wall (1992)
- Refuge (Japan) (1994)
- Higher than the Sky (1996)
- Live from the Vault (1997)
- In Vain - Rage in Acoustic (1998)
- Gib dich nie auf / Never Give Up (2009)
- My Way (2016)
- Spreading the Plague (2022)

=== Live albums ===
- Power of Metal (1994)
- From the Cradle to the Stage (2004)
- Full Moon in St. Petersburg (2007)
- Live in Tokyo (2012)

=== Compilation albums ===
- The Best from the Noise Years (1998)
- Best of – All G.U.N. Years (2001)
- The Soundchaser Archives (2014)

=== Box sets ===
- The Lingua Mortis Trilogy (The Classic Collection) (2002)
- The Refuge Years (2015)

=== Videography ===
- The Video Link (1994)
- Metal Meets Classic Live (2001)
- From the Cradle to the Stage (2004)
- Full Moon in St. Petersburg (2007)
- Live at Wacken '09 (2009)

== Music videos ==
Year	Title	Notes
1987	"Down by Law"	
1988	"Don't Fear the Winter"	
1989	"Invisible Horizons"	
1990	"True Face in Everyone"	
1990	"Waiting for the Moon"	
1993	"Refuge"	
1995	"Alive but Dead"	Directed by Tim Luna and Andreas Marschall
1996	"Lingua Mortis Medley"	
1996	"Deep in the Blackest Hole"	Directed by Tim Luna and Andreas Marschall
1998	"From the Cradle to the Grave"	
2002	"Down"	
2005	"Straight to Hell"	
2006	"No Fear"	
2008	"Lord of the Flies"	
2008	"Open My Grave"	
2009	"Never Give Up"	
2009	"Gib dich nie auf"	
2012	"Twenty One"	
2013	"Cleansed by Fire" (LMO)	
2016	"My Way"	
2016	"The Devil Strikes Again"	
2017	"Blackened Karma"	
2017	"Season of the Black"	
2019	"Let Them Rest in Peace"	
2019	"True"	
2020	"The Price of War 2.0"	
2021	"Virginity"	
2021	"Monetary Gods"	
2022	"To Live and to Die"	
2024	''Under a Black Crown'' ''Cold Desire'' ''Dying to Live''	
