= Unity (Rage album) =

- Cover art by Joachim Luetke

Studio album by Rage
- Released: 13 May 2002
- Recorded: January–February 2002
- Studios: Twilight Hall Studio, Grefrath, Germany
- Genre: Power metal, Thrash Metal, Industrial Metal, heavy metal
- Length: 50:16
- Label: SPV/Steamhammer
- Producers: Rage & Charlie Bauerfeind

Rage chronology
Welcome to the Other Side (2001)	Unity (2002)	The Lingua Mortis Trilogy (2002)

Unity is the 16th studio album by the German heavy metal band Rage, released in 2002 by SPV/Steamhammer.

== Track listing ==
All lyrics are written by Peavy Wagner, except where noted.

No.	Title	Lyrics	Music	Length
1.	"All I Want"		Victor Smolski	4:59
2.	"Insanity"		Wagner	4:21
3.	"Down"		Smolski	5:24
4.	"Set This World on Fire"		Wagner, Smolski	5:05
5.	"Dies Iræ"	Wagner, Smolski	Smolski	5:08
6.	"World of Pain"		Wagner	4:02
7.	"Shadows"	instrumental	Smolski	0:57
8.	"Living My Dream"	Mike Terrana	Terrana, Smolski	4:49
9.	"Seven Deadly Sins"		Wagner	4:09
10.	"You Want It, You'll Get It"		Smolski	4:05
11.	"Unity"	instrumental	Terrana, Smolski	7:17
Total length:				50:16

Limited edition bonus tracks
No.	Title	Length
12.	"Mystery Trip"	4:16
13.	"Down" (Video Clip)	3:58

Japanese edition bonus track
No.	Title	Length
12.	"Darkness Turns to Light"	5:14

== Personnel ==
=== Band members ===
- Peavy Wagner – vocals, bass
- Victor Smolski – guitars
- Mike Terrana – drums

=== Additional musicians ===
- Hansi Kürsch, D.C. Cooper – backing vocals

=== Production ===
- Charlie Bauerfeind – producer, engineering, mixing, mastering
