= Manni Schmidt =

German guitarist

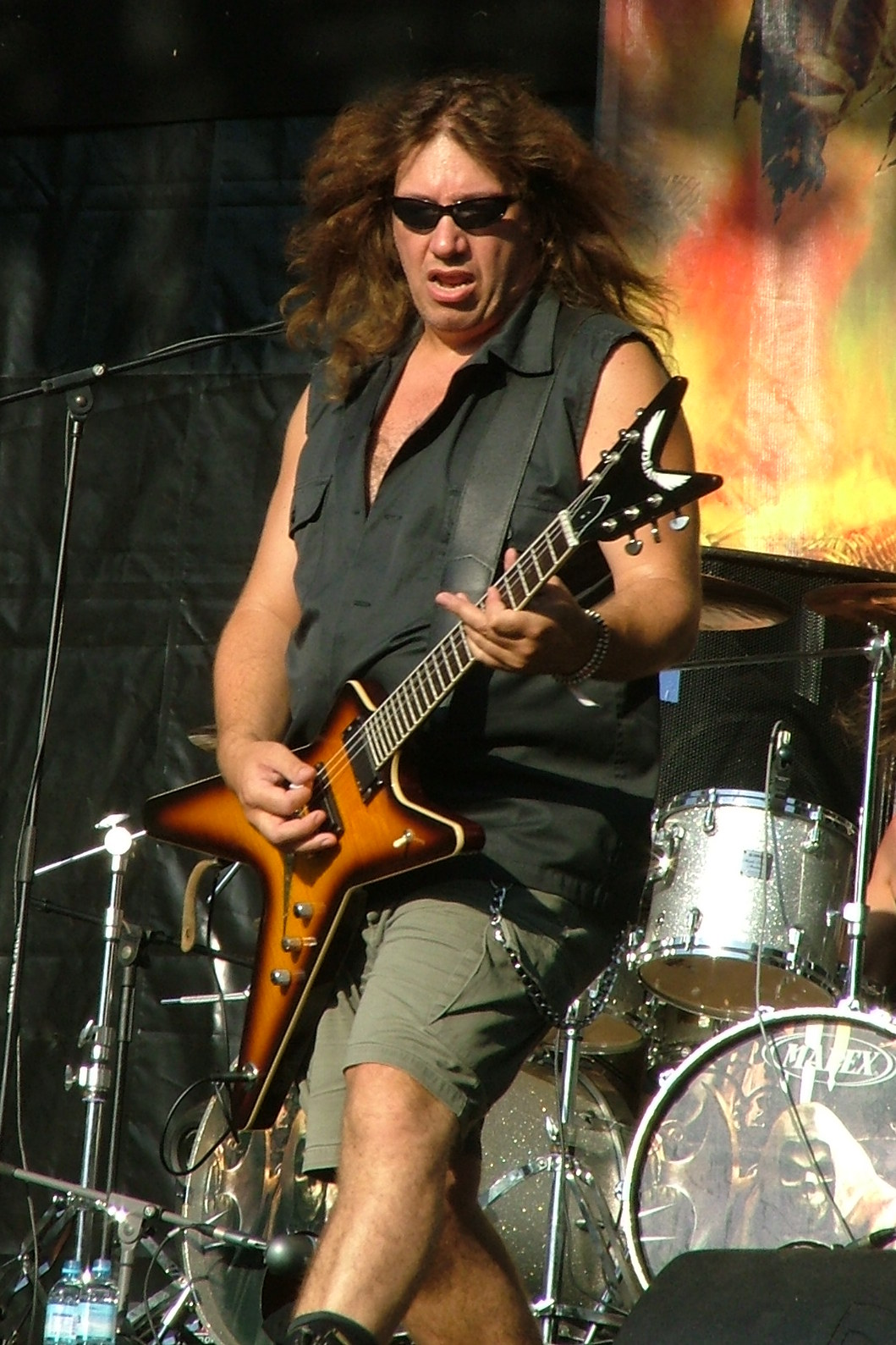
- Schmidt in 2007

Background information
- Birth name: Manfred Schmidt
- Born: 27 November 1964 (age 60); Andernach, West Germany
- Genres: Heavy metal, power metal, speed metal
- Occupation: Guitarist
- Member of: Refuge
- Formerly of: Rage, Grave Digger, Jack of Hearts

Manfred "Manni" Schmidt (born 27 November 1964) is a German heavy metal guitarist, best known as a former member of Grave Digger and Rage.

== History ==
Born in Andernach, West Germany, Schmidt begun his career starting his own band Factor 6. However, the heavy metal band Rage had noticed Schmidt and his skills with the guitar, so in 1987, he was asked to become a member of that band. He joined and become a member of the trio and released many albums with them. In 1994, he quit the band. His first son was born in 1997, the second in 2003.

In 2000, another door was opened for him when guitarist Uwe Lulis left German heavy metal band Grave Digger. Their bassist Jens Becker suggested Schmidt as a replacement. He remained with them until October 2009.

In early 2010, Schmidt formed his own band, Capital Joke.

== Discography ==
=== With Rage ===
- Perfect Man (1988)
- Invisible Horizons (single) (1989)
- Secrets in a Weird World (1989)
- Reflections of a Shadow (1990)
- Extended Power (EP) (1991)
- Beyond the Wall (EP) (1992)
- Trapped! (1992)
- Refuge (Japan) (1993)
- The Missing Link (1993)
- The Video Link (1994)

=== With Jack of Hearts ===
- Welcome to Heartland (demo) (1993)

=== With Grave Digger ===
- The Grave Digger (2001)
- Tunes of Wacken (live CD + DVD) (2002)
- Rheingold (2003)
- The Last Supper (2005)
- 25 To Live (live CD + DVD) (2005)
- Yesterday (EP) (2006)
- Silent Revolution (single) (2006)
- Liberty or Death (2007)
- Pray (EP) (2008)
- Ballads of a Hangman (2009)
