= List of Grave Digger band members =

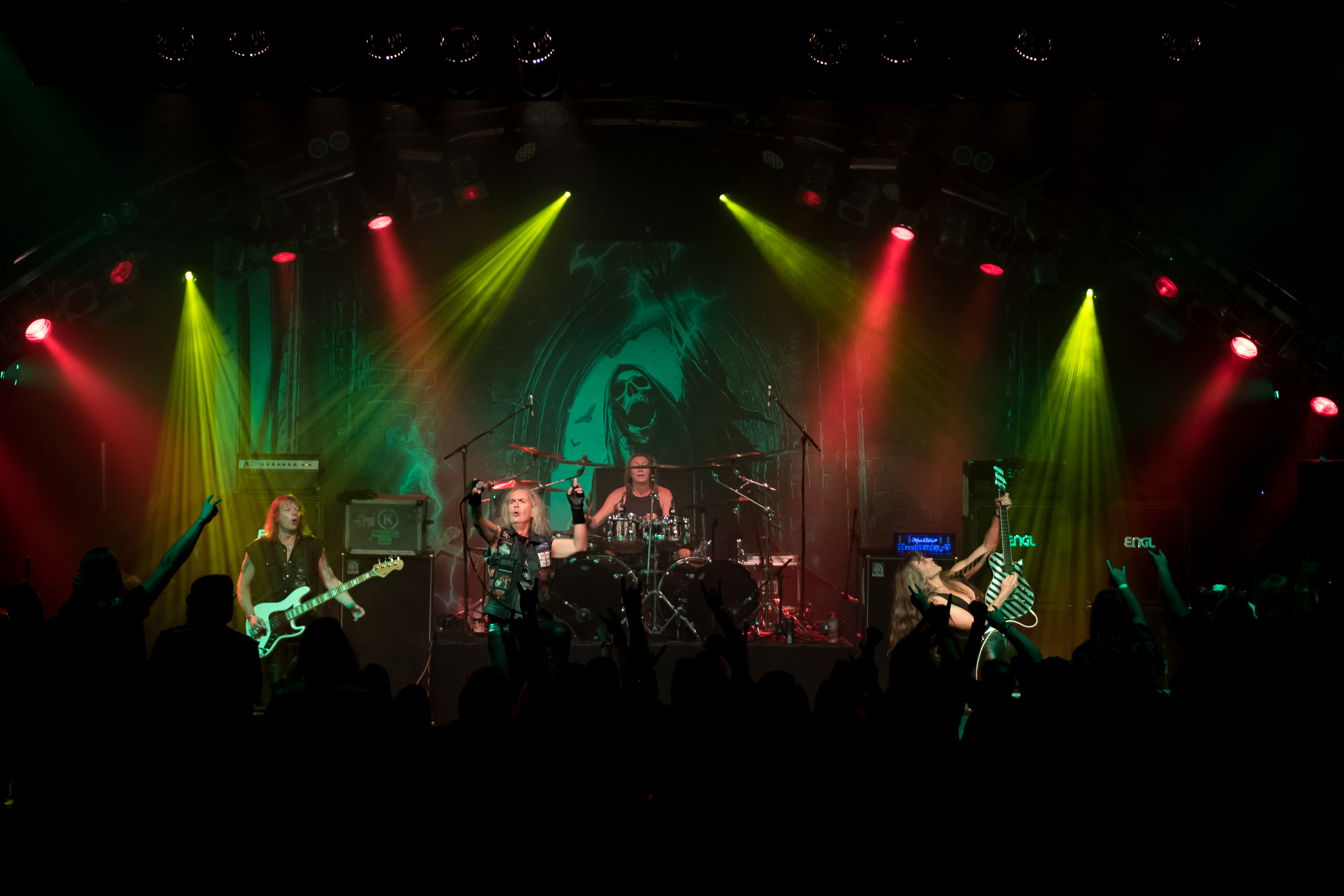
Grave Digger performing live in 2017.

Grave Digger is a German heavy metal band from Gladbeck. Formed in November 1980, the group was originally a trio consisting of vocalist and bassist Chris Boltendahl, guitarist Peter Masson, and drummer Lutz Schmelzer. Boltendahl remains the only constant member of the band, which currently also features bassist Jens Becker (since 1997), drummer and keyboardist Marcus "Gravey" Kniep (since 2014), and guitarist Tobias "Tobi" Kersting (since 2023).

== History ==
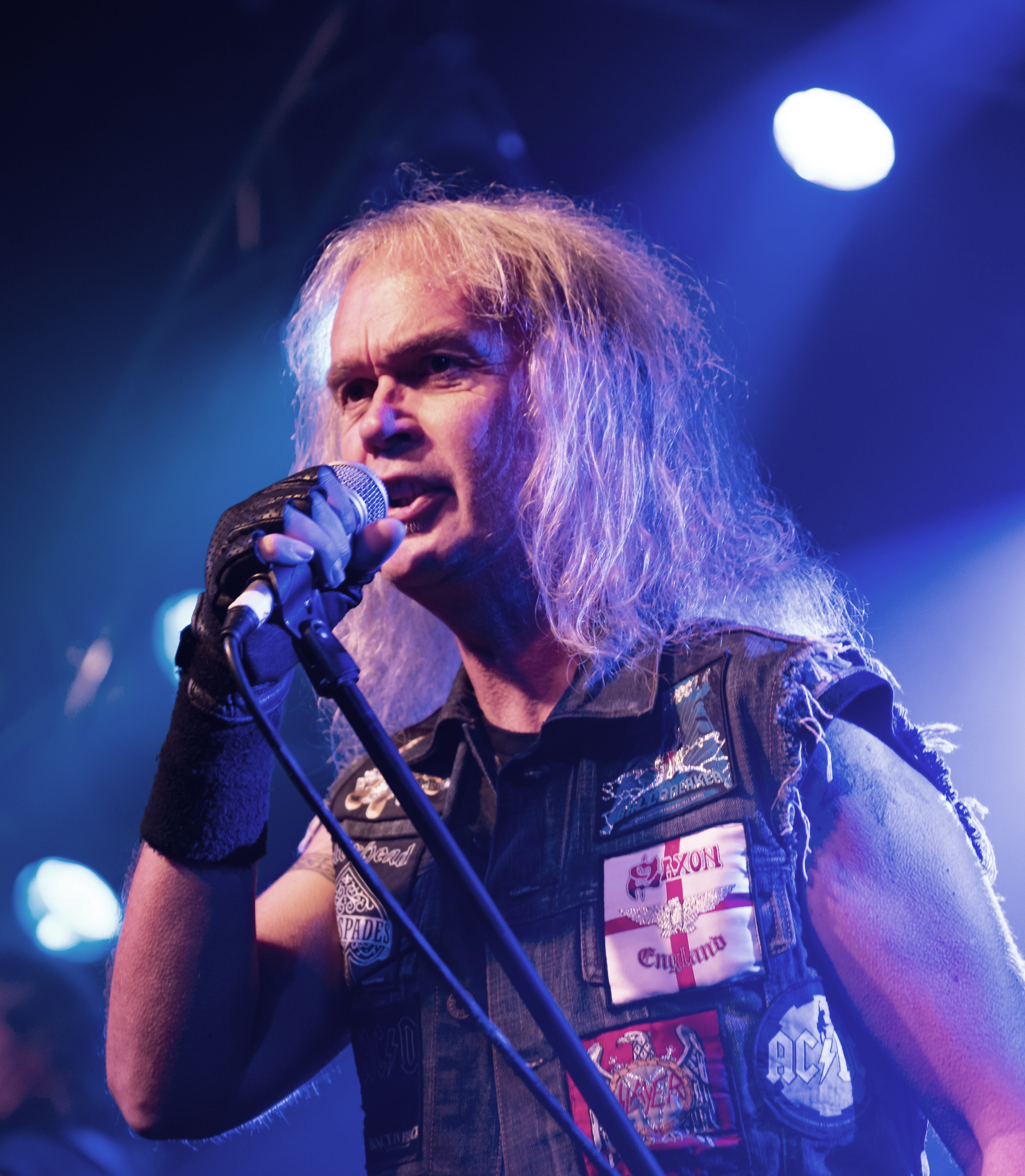
Singer Chris Boltendahl formed Grave Digger in 1980.

=== 1980–1991 ===
Grave Digger was formed in November 1980. The original lineup included vocalist/bassist Chris Boltendahl, guitarist Peter Masson and drummer Lutz Schmelzer, although Schmelzer was replaced by Philip Seibel after roughly a year. The band recorded its first demo during 1982, which was followed by a second with Challenger members Willi Lackman on bass and Albert Eckardt on drums in early 1983. By August 1983, the group had disbanded and both Boltendahl and Masson had joined Challenger. Shortly thereafter, Noise Records offered the band a record deal, leading the four members to revert to the name Grave Digger and record their debut album, Heavy Metal Breakdown.

During touring in promotion of Heavy Metal Breakdown in the summer of 1984, Grave Digger parted ways with Lackman due to personal and musical differences, with Boltendahl playing bass on the EP Shoot Her Down before René "T. Bone" Teichgräber took over for shows at the end of the year. After recording two tracks for the next album Witch Hunter, Teichgräber was also dismissed, with Boltendahl and Masson completing bass parts. After the album was finished, the band brought in Christian "C. F." Brank as its new bassist. The new lineup released War Games at the beginning of 1986, before Masson left the band that spring due to musical disagreements, leaving Boltendahl the sole remaining original member. He was replaced in the summer by Uwe Lulis and the band shortened its name to Digger, releasing Stronger Than Ever before the end of the year.

After their sole album received poor reviews, Digger broke up in March 1987. Around December that year, Boltendahl and Lulis started touring under the name Grave Digger again, with Jochen Wiek on bass and Jochen "J. J." Börner on drums. Boltendahl and Lulis briefly worked with Brank again (plus drummer Ralf Maunert) in a group called Vivian, before reuniting with Börner and new bassist Rainer Bandzus in another new group, Hawaii, in January 1989. Hawaii recorded a single demo titled Bottles and Four Coconuts, the tracks from which were later featured on the Grave Digger compilation The Forgotten Years. Hawaii remained active until early 1991, when Boltendahl and Lulis reformed Grave Digger.

=== 1991–2009 ===
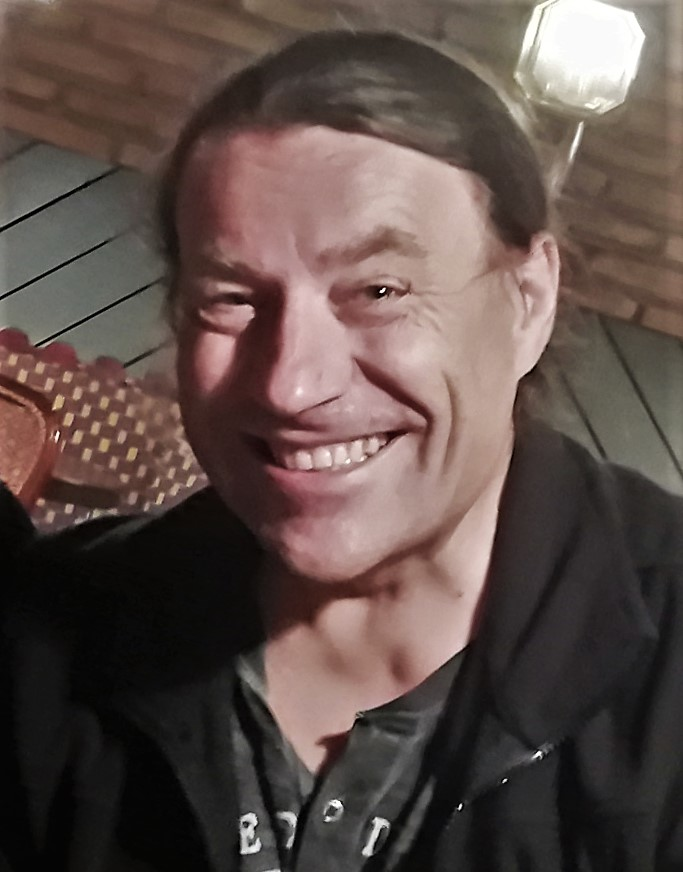
Guitarist Uwe Lulis remained with Grave Digger when the band reformed in 1991.

Grave Digger reformed in June 1991. With bassist Tomi Göttlich and drummer Peter Breitenbach alongside Boltendahl and Lulis, the band released the demo Return of the Reaper in 1991, followed by the EP For Promotion Only!! in 1992. Breitenbach was replaced by Jörg Michael in May 1993, who debuted on the band's first album since 1986, The Reaper, later that year. Michael was gone after a year, switching to Running Wild, with Frank Ullrich taking his place for 1995's Heart of Darkness; by September 1995, Ullrich had also left, with Stefan Arnold taking his place that December. After the release and touring of 1996's Tunes of War, Göttlich left Grave Digger and was replaced by former Running Wild bassist Jens Becker, who debuted on Knights of the Cross. 1999's Excalibur was the band's first album to credit keyboardist H. P. Katzenburg as an official band member.

In November 2000, long-time guitarist Uwe Lulis left Grave Digger, with former Rage guitarist Manni Schmidt taking his place the next month. Lulis subsequently formed a new group with former bandmate Tomi Göttlich, initially attempting to take over use of the name "Grave Digger", before settling on Rebellion. The lineup of Boltendahl, Schmidt, Becker, Arnold and Katzenburg became the most stable in Grave Digger's history, releasing studio albums The Grave Digger, Rheingold, The Last Supper and Liberty or Death between 2001 and 2007. In October 2007, the group announced the addition of former Running Wild guitarist Thilo Hermann, marking the first time in its history the band had featured two guitarists. Shortly after the release of Ballads of a Hangman, however, Hermann was dismissed in February 2009. Schmidt also left in October due to disagreements with Boltendahl.

=== Since 2009 ===
After Schmidt's departure, Grave Digger played their last shows of 2009 with substitute guitarist Axel "Ironfinger" Ritt. In a statement published in January 2010, the band confirmed that Ritt was now a full-time member. The Clans Will Rise Again (2010), Clash of the Gods (2012) and Return of the Reaper (2014) followed, before Katzenburg was replaced by Marcus "Gravey" Kniep in November 2014. The new lineup recorded two albums — Healed by Metal and The Living Dead — before Arnold left the band in June and Kniep switched primarily to drums. Back to a four-piece, Grave Digger released Fields of Blood in 2020 and Symbol of Eternity in 2022, before Ritt left in September 2023. He was replaced a month later by Tobias "Tobi" Kersting.

== Members ==
=== Current ===
Image	Name	Years active	Instruments	Release contributions
	Chris Boltendahl	1980–1983; 1983–1987; 1987–1988; 1989–present	vocals; bass (1980–1983, fall 1984, early 1985)	all Grave Digger releases
	Jens Becker	1997–present	bass	all Grave Digger releases from Knights of the Cross (1998) onwards
	Marcus "Gravey" Kniep	2014–present	keyboards; drums (since summer 2018)	all Grave Digger releases from Healed by Metal (2017) onwards
	Tobias "Tobi" Kersting	2023–present	guitar	all Grave Digger releases from "The Grave Is Yours" (2024) onwards

=== Former ===
Image	Name	Years active	Instruments	Release contributions
	Peter "Speedfinger" Masson	1980–1986	guitar; backing vocals; bass (early 1985)	all Grave Digger releases from the 1982 demo to War Games (1986)
	Lutz Schmelzer	1980–1981	drums	none
	Philip Seibel (died 2002)	1981–1983	drums	1982 demo
	Albert Eckardt	1983–1987	drums	all Grave Digger releases from the Born Again demo (1983) to Stronger Than Ever (1986)
	Willi Lackman (died 2013)	1983–1984	bass	Born Again demo (1983); Rock from Hell (1983); Heavy Metal Breakdown (1984)
	René "T. Bone" Teichgräber	1984–1985	bass	Witch Hunter (1985) — two tracks only
	Christian "C. F." Brank	1985–1987	bass; backing vocals	War Games (1986); Stronger Than Ever (1986)
	Uwe Lulis	1986–1987; 1987–1988; 1989–2000	guitar; backing vocals	all Grave Digger releases from Stronger Than Ever (1986) to Excalibur (1999)
	Jochen "J. J." Börner	1987–1988; 1989–1991	drums	Bottles and Four Coconuts demo (1989)
	Jochen Wiek	1987–1988	bass	none
	Rainer Bandzus	1989–1991	bass	Bottle and Four Coconuts demo (1989)
	Tomi Göttlich	1991–1997	bass; backing vocals	all Grave Digger releases from the Return of the Reaper demo (1991) to The Dark of the Sun (1997)
	Peter Breitenbach	1991–1993	drums	Return of the Reaper demo (1991); For Promotion Only!! (1992)
	Jörg Michael	1993–1994	drums	The Reaper (1993); Symphony of Death (1994)
	Frank Ullrich	1994–1995	drums	Heart of Darkness (1995)
	Stefan Arnold	1995–2018	drums	all Grave Digger releases from Tunes of War (1996) to The Living Dead (2018)
	Hans Peter "H. P." Katzenburg	1996–2014 (official member since 1999)	keyboards	all Grave Digger releases from Tunes of War (1996) to Return of the Reaper (2014); Fields of Blood (2020)
	Manni Schmidt	2000–2009	guitar; backing vocals	all Grave Digger releases from The Grave Digger (2001) to Ballads of a Hangman (2009)
	Thilo Hermann	2007–2009	guitar; backing vocals	Pray (2008); Ballads of a Hangman (2009)
	Axel "Ironfinger" Ritt	2009–2023	guitar	all Grave Digger releases from The Clans Will Rise Again (2010) to Symbol of Eternity (2022)

== Lineups ==
Period	Members	Releases
November 1980–November 1981	Chris Boltendahl — lead vocals, bass; Peter Masson — guitar, backing vocals; Lutz Schmelzer — drums	none
November 1981–August 1983	Chris Boltendahl — lead vocals, bass; Peter Masson — guitar, backing vocals; Philip Seibel — drums	untitled 1982 demo
Early 1983 (temporary recording lineup)	Chris Boltendahl — lead vocals; Peter Masson — guitar, backing vocals; Willi Lackman — bass (stand-in); Albert Eckhardt — drums (stand-in)	Born Again demo (1983)
Band inactive August–late 1983
October 1983–summer 1984	Chris Boltendahl — lead vocals; Peter Masson — guitar, backing vocals; Willi Lackman — bass; Albert Eckhardt — drums	Rock from Hell sampler (1983); Heavy Metal Breakdown (1984)
Summer–fall 1984	Chris Boltendahl — lead vocals, bass; Peter Masson — guitar, backing vocals; Albert Eckhardt — drums	Shoot Her Down (1984)
Late 1984–January 1985	Chris Boltendahl — lead vocals; Peter Masson — guitar, backing vocals; René T. Bone — bass; Albert Eckhardt — drums	Witch Hunter (1985) — two tracks
January–February 1985	Chris Boltendahl — lead vocals, bass; Peter Masson — guitar, bass, backing vocals; Albert Eckhardt — drums	Witch Hunter (1985) — remaining tracks; Metal Attack, Vol. 1 (1985)
March 1985–spring 1986	Chris Boltendahl — lead vocals; Peter Masson — guitar, backing vocals; C. F. Brank — bass, backing vocals; Albert Eckhardt — drums	War Games (1986)
Summer 1986–March 1987 (as Digger)	Chris Boltendahl — lead vocals; Uwe Lulis — guitar, backing vocals; C. F. Brank — bass, backing vocals; Albert Eckhardt — drums	Stronger Than Ever (1986)
Band inactive March–December 1987
December 1987–early 1988	Chris Boltendahl — lead vocals; Uwe Lulis — guitar, backing vocals; Jochen Wiek — bass; J. J. Börner — drums	none
Band inactive early 1988–January 1989
January 1989–early 1991 (as Hawaii)	Chris Boltendahl — lead vocals; Uwe Lulis — guitar, backing vocals; Rainer Bandzus — bass; Jochen Börner — drums	Bottles and Four Coconuts demo (1989)
June 1991–May 1993	Chris Boltendahl — lead vocals; Uwe Lulis — guitar, backing vocals; Tomi Gottlich — bass, backing vocals; Peter Breitenbach — drums	Return of the Reaper demo (1991); For Promotion Only!! (1992)
May 1993–May 1994	Chris Boltendahl — lead vocals; Uwe Lulis — guitar, backing vocals; Tomi Gottlich — bass, backing vocals; Jörg Michael — drums	The Reaper (1993); Symphony of Death (1994)
May 1994–September 1995	Chris Boltendahl — lead vocals; Uwe Lulis — guitar, backing vocals; Tomi Gottlich — bass, backing vocals; Frank Ullrich — drums	Heart of Darkness (1995)
December 1995–late 1997	Chris Boltendahl — lead vocals; Uwe Lulis — guitar, backing vocals; Tomi Gottlich — bass, backing vocals; Stefan Arnold — drums; H. P. Katzenburg — keyboards (from 1996)	Tunes of War (1996); The Dark of the Sun (1997)
Late 1997–November 2000	Chris Boltendahl — lead vocals; Uwe Lulis — guitar, backing vocals; Jens Becker — bass; Stefan Arnold — drums; H. P. Katzenburg — keyboards	Knights of the Cross (1998); Excalibur (1999)
December 2000–October 2007	Chris Boltendahl — lead vocals; Manni Schmidt — guitar, backing vocals; Jens Becker — bass; Stefan Arnold — drums; H. P. Katzenburg — keyboards	The Grave Digger (2001); Tunes of Wacken (2002); Rheingold (2003); The Last Supper (2005); 25 to Live (2005); Yesterday (2006); Liberty or Death (2007)
October 2007–February 2009	Chris Boltendahl — lead vocals; Manni Schmidt — guitar, backing vocals; Thilo Hermann — guitar, backing vocals; Jens Becker — bass; Stefan Arnold — drums; H. P. Katzenburg — keyboards	Pray (2008); Ballads of a Hangman (2009)
February–October 2009	Chris Boltendahl — lead vocals; Manni Schmidt — guitar, backing vocals; Jens Becker — bass; Stefan Arnold — drums; H. P. Katzenburg — keyboards	none
November 2009–November 2014	Chris Boltendahl — vocals; Axel Ritt — guitar; Jens Becker — bass; Stefan Arnold — drums; H. P. Katzenburg — keyboards	The Clans Will Rise Again (2010); The Ballad of Mary (2011); The Clans Are Still Marching (2011); Wacken Hymne (2011); Home at Last (2012); Clash of the Gods (2012); Return of the Reaper (2014)
November 2014–June 2018	Chris Boltendahl — vocals; Axel Ritt — guitar; Jens Becker — bass; Stefan Arnold — drums; Marcus Kniep — keyboards	Healed by Metal (2017); The Living Dead (2018)
June 2018–September 2023	Chris Boltendahl — vocals; Axel Ritt — guitar; Jens Becker — bass; Marcus Kniep — drums, keyboards	Fields of Blood (2020); Symbol of Eternity (2022)
October 2023–present	Chris Boltendahl — vocals; Tobias Kersting — guitar; Jens Becker — bass; Marcus Kniep — drums, keyboards	"The Grave Is Yours" (2024); "Hell Is My Purgatory" (2024); Bone Collector (2025); "Hellfire Crusade" (2025); "Bark to Hell" (2025)
