= The Best of the Eighties =

Greatest hits album by Grave Digger
- Released: 1993
- Genres: Heavy metal Speed metal
- Length: 61:55
- Label: Noise

Grave Digger chronology
Stronger Than Ever (1987)	The Best of the Eighties (1993)	The Reaper (1993)

The Best of the Eighties is a compilation album by German heavy metal band Grave Digger released in 1993. It consists of tracks from their first three albums from the 1980s, disregarding their fourth record "Stronger Than Ever," as well as a few rare tracks.

== Track listing ==
No.	Title	Originally from	Length
1.	"Heavy Metal Breakdown"	Heavy Metal Breakdown	3:40
2.	"Shoot Her Down!"	previously released as a 12"-single in Europe as well as on the American version of Heavy Metal Breakdown	3:39
3.	"Get Away"	Witch Hunter	2:59
4.	"Paradise"	War Games	4:13
5.	"(Enola Gay) Drop the Bomb"	War Games	3:25
6.	"Back from the War"	Heavy Metal Breakdown	5:35
7.	"Witch Hunter"	Witch Hunter	4:22
8.	"Keep On Rockin'"	War Games	3:04
9.	"2000 Lightyears from Home"	Heavy Metal Breakdown	2:53
10.	"Heaven Can Wait"	War Games	3:33
11.	"Headbanging Man"	Heavy Metal Breakdown	3:08
12.	"Night Drifter"	Witch Hunter	3:09
13.	"We Wanna Rock You"	B-side of "Shoot Her Down!"-12"-single - alternate recording than the version on Heavy Metal Breakdown)	3:36
14.	"Yesterday"	Heavy Metal Breakdown	5:05
15.	"Don't Kill the Children"	previously unreleased, from Witch Hunter recording sessions	3:16
16.	"Tears of Blood"	from Witch Hunter recording sessions, released on the Metal Attack II sampler	2:37
17.	"Girls of Rock 'n' Roll"	previously unreleased, from War Games recording sessions	3:41
