= Return of the Reaper =

Studio album by Grave Digger
- Released: 11, 14 & 16 July 2014 (EU); 15 July 2014 (US & Canada)
- Recorded: February–April 2014 at Principle Studios, Germany
- Genre: Heavy metal, power metal
- Label: Napalm
- Producer: Grave Digger

Grave Digger chronology
Clash of the Gods (2012)	Return of the Reaper (2014)	Healed by Metal (2017)

Return of the Reaper is the 17th album by German heavy metal band Grave Digger, released on 11 July 2014 via Napalm Records. It is the final album to feature H.P. Katzenburg on keyboards.

The album cover was created by Gyula Havancsák of Hjules Illustration and Design, who has been responsible for all of the band's artworks since 2005's The Last Supper.

When given a description about the album, vocalist Chris Boltendahl cites the album stylistically reminiscent of Heavy Metal Breakdown, Witch Hunter and The Reaper.

== Track listing ==
No.	Title	Length
1.	"Return of the Reaper" (Intro)	1:16
2.	"Hell Funeral"	3:01
3.	"War God"	3:46
4.	"Tattooed Rider"	4:03
5.	"Resurrection Day"	2:58
6.	"Season of the Witch"	5:04
7.	"Road Rage Killer"	3:18
8.	"Grave Desecrator"	4:22
9.	"Satan's Host"	2:56
10.	"Dia de los Muertos"	4:15
11.	"Death Smiles at All of Us"	3:52
12.	"Nothing to Believe"	4:33
Total length:		43:24

Limited edition bonus CD
No.	Title	Length
1.	"The Emperor's Death" (Bonus track)	5:33
2.	"Rebel of Damnation" (Bonus track)	3:30
3.	"The Round Table" (Live acoustic recording)	4:55
4.	"The Dark of the Sun" (live acoustic recording)	3:52
5.	"The Curse of Jacques" (Live acoustic recording)	5:31
6.	"The Ballad of Mary" (Live acoustic recording)	5:12
7.	"The Last Supper" (Live acoustic recording)	4:41
8.	"Yesterday" (Live acoustic recording)	3:54
9.	"Rebellion" (Live acoustic recording)	4:50
10.	"Heavy Metal Breakdown" (Live acoustic recording)	3:35
Total length:		45:33

== Charts ==
Chart	Peak position
German Albums Chart	16
Swiss Albums Chart	34
Austrian Albums Chart	59
Czech Albums Chart	65

== Personnel ==
- Chris Boltendahl - vocals
- Axel Ritt - guitars
- Jens Becker - bass
- Stefan Arnold - drums
- H.P. Katzenburg - keyboards

Production

- Gyula Havancsák - cover art
