= Bone Collector =

Bone collector or Bone Collector may refer to:

- The Bone Collector (novel), a 1997 thriller novel by Jefferey Deaver
- The Bone Collector, a 1999 American crime thriller film
- Bone Collector (album), a 2025 studio album by Grave Digger
- Larry Williams (basketball), known as Bone Collector
- Bone collecting, an Asian burial ritual performed by a bone collector
- Bone Collector, the perpetrator of the West Mesa murders
- A larva of a moth in the Hyposmocoma genus
