= Symbol of Eternity =

Studio album by Grave Digger
- Released: 26 August 2022
- Recorded: 2021–2022
- Studios: Principal Studios, Senden/Münster, Germany
- Genres: Heavy metal, power metal
- Length: 45:41
- Label: Napalm Records
- Producers: Chris Boltendahl, Axel Ritt

Grave Digger chronology
Fields of Blood (2020)	Symbol of Eternity (2022)	Bone Collector (2025)

Symbol of Eternity is the twenty-first studio album by German heavy metal band Grave Digger, released on 26 August 2022 by Napalm Records. The album continues the band's story of the Crusaders, first explored in their 1998 album Knights of the Cross. It is the last album to feature guitarist Axel Ritt as he departed the band on 10 September 2023. He was replaced with former Orden Ogan guitarist Tobias Kersting.

== Track listing ==
No.	Title	Length
1.	"The Siege of Akkon"	1:04
2.	"Battle Cry"	3:53
3.	"Hell Is My Purgatory"	3:52
4.	"King of the Kings"	4:44
5.	"Symbol of Eternity"	5:19
6.	"Saladin"	0:37
7.	"Nights of Jerusalem"	4:40
8.	"Heart of a Warrior"	3:47
9.	"Grace of God"	4:24
10.	"Sky of Swords"	4:16
11.	"Holy Warfare"	3:44
12.	"The Last Crusade"	5:21

Bonus track
No.	Title	Length
13.	"Hellas Hellas" (Vasilis Papakonstantinou cover)	3:59

== Personnel ==
- Chris Boltendahl – vocals
- Axel Ritt – guitar
- Jens Becker – bass
- Marcus Kniep – drums, keyboards

== Charts ==
Chart (2022)	Peak position
German Albums (Offizielle Top 100)	7
Swiss Albums (Schweizer Hitparade)	25
