= The Clans Are Still Marching =

Video by Grave Digger
- Released: 7 March 2011
- Recorded: 6 August 2010 at Wacken Open Air in Wacken, Schleswig-Holstein, Germany
- Genre: Heavy metal, power metal
- Length: 1:15:49
- Label: Napalm
- Director: Andreas Marschall, Heiner Thimm
- Producer: Chris Boltendahl, Andreas Marschall, Heiner Thimm

Grave Digger chronology
25 to Live (2005)	The Clans Are Still Marching (2011)

The Clans Are Still Marching is a live DVD released by German heavy metal band Grave Digger on 7 March 2011 via Napalm Records. It was filmed live at the world-famous Wacken Open Air festival on 6 August 2010, where they performed their Tunes of War album in its entirety.

== Track listing ==
1. "The Brave" – 3:33
2. "Scotland United" – 4:58
3. "The Dark of the Sun" – 4:57
4. "William Wallace (Braveheart)" – 5:40
5. "The Bruce (The Lion King)" – 6:49
6. "The Battle of Flodden" – 5:19
7. "The Ballad of Mary (Queen of Scots)" – 5:21
8. "The Truth" – 4:05
9. "Cry for Freedom (James the VI)" – 3:34
10. "Killing Time" – 3:45
11. "Rebellion (The Clans Are Marching)" – 5:25
12. "Culloden Muir" – 5:14
13. "Ballad of a Hangman" – 4:42
14. "Excalibur" – 5:06
15. "Heavy Metal Breakdown" – 7:21

== Bonus Material ==
The DVD was released as digibook CD + DVD and digibook DVD + CD – both with bonus audio CD with the same track list (excluding DVD extras). Audio CD was not released separately. The DVD features bonus material which contains the following:

- "Highland Farewell" video clip"
- "Behind the scenes ("Highland Farewell")"
- "History interview with Chris Boltendahl (in English)"
- "History interview with Chris Boltendahl (in German)"
- "Axel Ritt's iPhone clips"
- "Photo galleries (Wacken 2010 slide show)"

== Personnel ==
- Chris Boltendahl – vocals
- Axel Ritt – guitars
- Jens Becker – bass
- Stefan Arnold – drums
- H.P. Katzenburg – keyboards

== Additional Musicians ==
- Van Canto – choir & backup vocals
- Hansi Kürsch – additional vocals on "Rebellion (The Clans Are Marching)"
- Doro Pesch – additional vocals on "The Ballad of Mary (Queen of Scots)"
- Baul Muluy Pipes & Drums – choir on "The Brave"

== Production ==
- Gyula Havancsák – cover art
- Andreas Schöwe – photography
- Chris Boltendahl – producer
- Jörg Umbreit – mixing, mastering
- Andreas Marschall – producer, director
- Heiner Thimm – producer, director
- Jacky Lehmann – engineering (audio)
