= The Scythe of Time =

The Scythe of Time may refer to:

- a humorous short story by Edgar Allan Poe, later published as "A Predicament"
- "Scythe of Time," a track on Grave Digger's album The Grave Digger based on Poe's story
