= Symphony of Death =

EP by Grave Digger
- Released: 1994
- Recorded: Germany
- Genre: Heavy metal Power metal
- Length: 24:25
- Label: G.U.N. Records

Symphony of Death is an EP released by Grave Digger.

== Track listing ==
1. "Intro"
2. "Symphony of Death"
3. "Back to the Roots"
4. "House of Horror"
5. "Shout it Out"
6. "World of Fools"
7. "Wild and Dangerous"

== Japanese bonus track ==
8. "Sin City (AC/DC Cover)"

== Personnel ==
- Chris Boltendahl – vocals
- Uwe Lulis – guitars
- Thomas Göttlich – bass
- Jörg Michael – drums, percussion
