= The Living Dead (Grave Digger album) =

2018 studio album by Grave Digger

Studio album by Grave Digger
- Released: 14 September 2018
- Recorded: April–June 2018
- Studio: Principal Studios, Senden/Münster, Germany
- Genre: Heavy metal, power metal
- Length: 41:10
- Label: Napalm Records
- Producer: Chris Boltendahl, Axel Ritt

Grave Digger chronology
Healed by Metal (2017)	The Living Dead (2018)	Fields of Blood (2020)

The Living Dead is the nineteenth studio album by German heavy metal band Grave Digger, released on 14 September 2018 by Napalm Records. It is the last album to feature drummer Stefan Arnold as he departed the band in June 2018.

== Release and promotion ==
On 6 June 2018, Grave Digger announced its nineteenth album, The Living Dead, with a European tour in January and February 2019. In the months between the album's announcement and release, the band uploaded music videos for the songs "Fear of the Living Dead", "Zombie Dance" (featuring Russkaja), and "The Power of Metal". The 2019 tour includes a show at Tufnell Park Dome in London with Burning Witches.

== Track listing ==
No.	Title	Length
1.	"Fear of the Living Dead"	5:31
2.	"Blade of the Immortal"	4:07
3.	"When Death Passes By"	3:52
4.	"Shadow of the Warrior"	4:33
5.	"The Power of Metal"	3:52
6.	"Hymn of the Damned"	5:30
7.	"What War Left Behind"	3:30
8.	"Fist in Your Face"	3:23
9.	"Insane Pain"	3:05
10.	"Zombie Dance" (feat. Russkaja)	3:46

Digipak edition bonus track
No.	Title	Length
11.	"Glory or Grave"	4:21

Deluxe edition bonus track
No.	Title	Length
12.	"Nightmare"	3:59

== Personnel ==
- Chris Boltendahl – vocals
- Axel Ritt – guitar
- Jens Becker – bass
- Stefan Arnold – drums
- Marcus Kniep – keyboards

== Charts ==
Chart (2018)	Peak position
German Albums (Offizielle Top 100)	21
Swiss Albums (Schweizer Hitparade)	41
