= The Grave Digger =

Studio album by Grave Digger
- Released: 22 October 2001
- Recorded: May–June 2001 at Principal Studios, Senden, Münster, Germany; Pre-production recorded at Graveyard Studios, Netherlands; Mastered at Principal Studios, Germany
- Genre: Power metal
- Label: Nuclear Blast
- Producer: Chris Boltendahl, Jörg Umbreit, Vincent Sorg & Manni Schmidt

Grave Digger chronology
Excalibur (1999)	The Grave Digger (2001)	Tunes of Wacken – Live (2002)

The Grave Digger is the tenth studio album by German heavy metal band Grave Digger. It the first album to feature former Rage guitarist Manni Schmidt, and is often considered the darkest album the band has done, along with 1995's Heart of Darkness. The lyrics are about dark concepts, some are inspired by the works of Edgar Allan Poe.

AllMusic stated in its review of the album, "In short, for a band that's never gotten much respect over the years Grave Digger's influence on the power metal genre is undeniable and, with its unassuming excellence, The Grave Digger is a perfect example why."

== Track listing ==
All songs are composed and arranged by Boltendahl, Becker and Schmidt; all lyrics by Boltendahl.

No.	Title	Length
1.	"Son of Evil"	5:04
2.	"The Grave Digger"	5:05
3.	"Raven"	4:33
4.	"Scythe of Time"	5:14
5.	"Spirits of the Dead"	3:55
6.	"The House"	5:41
7.	"King Pest"	4:08
8.	"Sacred Fire"	4:11
9.	"Funeral Procession"	5:45
10.	"The Haunted Palace"	4:13
11.	"Silence"	7:15
Total length:		55:04

Japanese edition bonus track
No.	Title	Length
12.	"Running Free" (Iron Maiden cover)	3:13
Total length:		58:17

Russian edition bonus tracks
No.	Title	Length
12.	"Black Cat" (also in Digipak edition)	3:50
13.	"Starlight" (Accept cover)	4:19
Total length:		1:03:13

== Note ==
The 2006 re-issue by Nuclear Blast includes the 2003 album Rheingold.

== Credits ==
Band members

- Chris Boltendahl - vocals
- Manni Schmidt - guitars
- Jens Becker - bass
- Stefan Arnold - drums
- HP Katzenburg - keyboards

Additional musicians

- Olaf Senkbeil - backing Vocals
- Hacky Hackmann - backing Vocals

Production

- Britta Kühlmann - recording
- Henning Winter - recording
- Jens Rosendahl - photography
- Markus Mayer - artwork, cover concept, design
- Chris Boltendahl - producer, cover concept
- Jörg Umbreit - producer, recording, mixing
- Manni Schmidt - producer
- Vincent Sorg - producer, mixing, mastering
