= Fields of Blood (album) =

Studio album by Grave Digger
- Released: 29 May 2020
- Recorded: 2019–2020
- Studios: Principal Studios, Senden/Münster, Germany
- Genres: Heavy metal, power metal
- Length: 53:40
- Label: Napalm Records
- Producers: Chris Boltendahl, Axel Ritt, Joerg Umbreit

Grave Digger chronology
| The Living Dead (2018) | Fields of Blood (2020) | Symbol of Eternity (2022) |

Fields of Blood is the twentieth studio album by German heavy metal band Grave Digger, released on 29 May 2020 by Napalm Records, celebrating the band's 40th anniversary. Music videos were made for the songs "All For The Kingdom" and "Lions of the Sea".

== Track listing ==
| No. | Title | Length |
|---|---|---|
| 1. | "The Clansman's Journey" | 1:31 |
| 2. | "All for the Kingdom" | 4:07 |
| 3. | "Lions of the Sea" | 3:52 |
| 4. | "Freedom" | 4:54 |
| 5. | "The Heart of Scotland" | 5:19 |
| 6. | "Thousand Tears" | 4:57 |
| 7. | "Union of the Crown" | 3:58 |
| 8. | "My Final Fight" | 4:09 |
| 9. | "Gathering of the Clans" | 3:57 |
| 10. | "Barbarian" | 3:46 |
| 11. | "Fields of Blood" | 10:11 |
| 12. | "Requiem for the Fallen" | 2:59 |

== Personnel ==
- Chris Boltendahl – vocals
- Axel Ritt – guitar
- Jens Becker – bass
- Marcus Kniep – drums, keyboards

== Charts ==
| Chart (2020) | Peak position |
|---|---|
| German Albums (Offizielle Top 100) | 17 |
| Swiss Albums (Schweizer Hitparade) | 17 |
