= Ballads of a Hangman =

Studio album by Grave Digger
- Released: 27 January 2009
- Recorded: August–October 2008 at Principal Studios, Germany
- Genre: Heavy metal, power metal
- Label: Napalm
- Producer: Grave Digger, Resetti Brothers

Grave Digger chronology
Liberty or Death (2007)	Ballads of a Hangman (2009)	The Clans Will Rise Again (2010)

Professional ratings
Review scores
Source	Rating
Blabbermouth.net	7.5/10 stars
Metal Hammer	6/7 stars

Ballads of a Hangman is the 14th studio album by the German heavy metal band Grave Digger, and was released on 27 January 2009. It is the first Grave Digger album to feature two guitarists, the only one to feature Thilo Hermann who co-wrote the album but was asked to leave soon after its release and also the last one with Manni Schmidt who left the band in October 2009 due to personal differences with Chris Boltendahl.

The semi-ballad "Lonely The Innocence Dies" featuring Veronica Freeman of Benedictum was noted for being close to a harder version of "Where the Wild Roses Grow" by Kylie Minogue and Nick Cave.

== Track listing ==
No.	Title	Lyrics	Length
1.	"The Gallows Pole" (Intro)	Boltendahl	0:52
2.	"Ballad of a Hangman"	Boltendahl	4:47
3.	"Hell of Disillusion"	Boltendahl	3:56
4.	"Sorrow of the Dead"	Boltendahl	3:26
5.	"Grave of the Addicted"	Boltendahl	3:34
6.	"Lonely the Innocence Dies" (ft. Veronica Freeman)	Boltendahl	5:45
7.	"Into the War"	Boltendahl	3:32
8.	"The Shadow of Your Soul"	Boltendahl	4:15
9.	"Funeral for a Fallen Angel"	Boltendahl	4:32
10.	"Stormrider"	Boltendahl	3:17
11.	"Pray"	Boltendahl	3:37
Total length:			41:33

Bonus tracks
No.	Title	Lyrics	Length
12.	"Jailbreak" (Thin Lizzy cover)	Phil Lynott	4:05
13.	"Overkill" (Motörhead cover)	Kilmister	4:33
14.	"My Blood Will Live Forever"	Boltendahl	4:02
15.	"When the Sun Goes Down"	Boltendahl	3:56

All music composed by Boltendahl/Schmidt/Hermann

== Album line-up ==
- Chris Boltendahl - lead and backing vocals
- Manni Schmidt - guitars and backing vocals
- Thilo Hermann - guitars and backing vocals
- Jens Becker - bass
- Stefan Arnold - drums
- H.P. Katzenburg - keyboards
