= Shakespeare's Macbeth – A Tragedy in Steel =

Studio album by Rebellion
- Released: 2002
- Recorded: Black Solaris Studios
- Genre: Power metal, heavy metal
- Label: Drakkar
- Producer: Uwe Lulis, Tomi Göttlich

Rebellion chronology
Shakespeare's Macbeth – A Tragedy in Steel (2002)	Born a Rebel (2003)

Shakespeare's Macbeth – A Tragedy in Steel is a 2002 concept album by German heavy metal band Rebellion, based on the story of William Shakespeare's play Macbeth. The album has many spoken passages.

It was given a one out of ten rating by Chronicles of Chaos.

== Track listing ==
1. "Introduction" – 2:31
2. "Disdaining Fortune" – 4:59
3. "The Prophecy" – 6:56
4. "Husbandry in Heaven" – 13:11
5. "The Dead Arise" – 8:29
6. "Evil Speaks" – 4:06
7. "Letters of Blood" – 4:22
8. "Revenge" – 6:18
9. "Claws of Madness" – 8:01
10. "Demons Rising" – 7:49
11. "Die with Harness on Your Back" – 6:12

All songs written by Lulis and Göttlich, except track 3 (Eilen and Lulis).

== Credits ==
- Michael Seifert — vocals
- Uwe Lulis — guitars
- Björn Eilen — guitars, vocals, accordions
- Tomi Göttlich — bass
- Randy Black — drums

=== Speakers, cast ===
- Narrator — Bob Lyng
- Macbeth — Tomi Göttlich
- Lady MacBeth, Speaker and Singer — Francesca (Schmidt) Tzamtzis
- Macduff — Björn Eilen
- First witch — Yvonne Thorhauer
- Second witch — Saskia Schenkel
- Third witch — Ana Lara
- Gentlewoman — Christopher Lundmark
- Doctor — Randy Black
- Young Siward — Eli Hughes
