= Born a Rebel =

Studio album by Rebellion
- Released: 2003
- Recorded: Black Solaris Studios
- Genre: Power metal, heavy metal
- Label: Drakkar Records
- Producer: Uwe Lulis and Tomi Göttlich

Rebellion chronology
Shakespeare's Macbeth – A Tragedy in Steel (2003)	Born a Rebel (2003)	Sagas of Iceland – The History of the Vikings Volume 1 (2005)

Born a Rebel is an album by German power metal band Rebellion, released in 2003.

== Track listing ==
1. "Born a Rebel" (Lulis, Göttlich) – 4:02
2. "Adrenalin" (Lulis, Göttlich) – 3:39
3. "One for All" (Lulis, Göttlich) – 5:09
4. "World Is War" (Lulis, Göttlich) – 4:40
5. "Dragons Fly" (Lulis, Eilen, Göttlich) – 3:57
6. "Queen of Spades" (Lulis, Göttlich) – 5:23
7. "Iron Flames" (Lulis, Eilen, Göttlich) – 6:13
8. "Through the Fire" (Lulis, Göttlich, Seifert) – 5:34
9. "Devil's Child" (Lulis, Göttlich, Seifert) – 5:38
10. "Meet Your Demon" (Lulis, Black, Göttlich) – 3:34
11. "Power of Evil" (Lulis, Göttlich) – 5:10

== Credits ==
- Michael Seifert — vocals
- Uwe Lulis — guitars
- Björn Eilen — guitars
- Tomi Göttlich — bass
- Randy Black — drums
