= Arise Volume 3 =

Arise: From Ginnungagap to Ragnarök – The History of the Vikings Volume III

Studio album by Rebellion
- Released: 24 July 2009
- Recorded: Black Solaris Studios, Germany
- Genre: Power metal, heavy metal
- Length: 59:12
- Label: Massacre Records
- Producer: Uwe Lulis

Rebellion chronology
Miklagard – The History of the Vikings Volume 2 (2007)	Arise: From Ginnungagap to Ragnarök – The History of the Vikings Volume III (2009)

Professional ratings
Review scores
Source	Rating
Lords of Metal	(79/100)
Fury Rocks	(9/10)

Arise: From Ginnungagap to Ragnarök – The History of the Vikings Volume III is a concept album by German power metal band Rebellion and the last part of the Viking History trilogy. Released in July 2009, the album tells the history of the Norse Gods and Norse religion.

== Track listing ==
- All songs written by Michael Seifert, Uwe Lulis and Tomi Gottlich.
1. "War" – 3:53
2. "Arise" – 4:39
3. "Asgard" – 3:19
4. "Odin" – 4:39
5. "Runes" – 5:14
6. "Bolverk" – 3:16
7. "Thor" – 9:07
8. "Evil" – 4:10
9. "Loki" – 4:10
10. "Prelude" – 3:42
11. "Ragnarök" – 5:48
12. "Einherjar" – 7:22

== Lyrical concept ==
The songs are based on the stories written in the Eddas, both Poetic and Prose, referring to various events, topics, and deities ranging from the beginning of the world to the war that would end it. Each song refers to one such event or person.

1. The lyrics for "War" are about the war before the world was created, during which Odin and his two brothers slay many giants - the song mentions Ymir by name, as well as "his breed" being gone.
2. "Arise" is a song about the creation of the world from the flesh of Ymir, as well as the acquisition of fire from the realm of Muspelheim.
3. The song "Runes" tells the tale of Odin learning the power of runic magic by hanging from the bough of the cosmic tree Yggdrasil for nine days and nights.
4. "Bolverk" tells the tale of Odin taking the guise of a giant to steal the Mead of Poetry, in order to spit it out over Midgard and give wisdom to its denizens.
5. The lyrics for "Evil" tell of a prophecy by the Norns about Ragnarök - or specifically, about the beings that are destined to start it. The song states the fates of the giantess Angrboda and her spawn sired by Loki: Hel, Jörmungandr, and Fenris.
6. "Prelude" is a song about the time right before Ragnarök, the lyrics explaining how the Sun and the Moon are devoured by the wolves Sköll and Hati respectively, how the wolf Fenris breaks free from his bonds and the serpent Jörmungandr washes ashore to poison the entire world.
7. The subsequent song, "Ragnarök", is about how the world will end according to the Norse myths - the song describes the armies of Asgard assembling to fight the host of undead warriors of Hel and the fire giants of Muspelheim, as well as the fates of many famed beings from the mythos, namely: Freyr, Thor, Jörmungandr, Odin, Fenris, Garm, Týr, Heimdall and Loki.
8. The final song, "Einherjar", explains the life of the Odin's chosen warriors in the halls of Valhalla, their endless fighting and feasting on mead and pork until the day of Ragnarök.
9. The songs "Asgard", "Odin", "Thor" and "Loki" offer a short premise of the deities (and place) that are named in the title.

== Personnel ==
=== Rebellion ===
- Michael Seifert: vocals
- Uwe Lulis: rhythm and lead guitar
- Simone Wenzel: rhythm and lead guitar
- Tomi Göttlich: bass
- Gerd Lücking: drums, percussion

=== Additional personnel ===
- Malte Rathke: keyboards; orchestral arrangement on track 7
