= Healed by Metal =

Studio album by Grave Digger
- Released: 13 January 2017
- Recorded: Principal Studios, Senden / Münster, Germany, June–September 2016; Meadow Studios, Weiterstadt
- Genre: Heavy metal, power metal
- Length: 34:56
- Label: Napalm
- Producer: Grave Digger

Grave Digger chronology
Return of the Reaper (2014)	Healed by Metal (2017)	The Living Dead (2018)

Professional ratings
Review scores
Source	Rating
DangerDog	4/5 stars
MetalBlast	8/10 stars

Healed by Metal is the 18th studio album by German heavy metal band Grave Digger, which was released on 13 January 2017 via Napalm Records. This is the first album to feature new keyboardist Marcus Kniep as The Reaper since H.P. Katzenburg's departure in 2014.

A lyric video was made for "Call for War" and a music video was made for "Healed by Metal".

== Track listing ==
All songs composed and arranged by Boltendahl/Becker & Ritt; All lyrics by Chris Boltendahl

No.	Title	Length
1.	"Healed by Metal"	3:43
2.	"When Night Falls"	3:54
3.	"Lawbreaker"	3:05
4.	"Free Forever"	3:21
5.	"Call for War"	3:19
6.	"Ten Commandments of Metal"	3:25
7.	"The Hangman's Eye"	3:05
8.	"Kill Ritual"	3:41
9.	"Hallelujah"	3:28
10.	"Laughing with the Dead"	5:15

Digipak bonus tracks
No.	Title	Length
11.	"Kingdom of the Night"	4:07
12.	"Bucket List"	3:02
Total length:		43:23

Japanese edition bonus tracks
No.	Title	Length
11.	"Kingdom of the Night"	4:07
12.	"Bucket List"	3:02
13.	"Brave, Young & Innocent"	4:20
Total length:		48:10

== Personnel ==
- Chris Boltendahl – vocals
- Axel Ritt – guitars
- Jens Becker – bass
- Stefan Arnold – drums
- Marcus Kniep – keyboards

Additional musicians

- Hacky Hackman – backing vocals
- Frank Konrad – backing vocals
- Andreas von Lipinski – backing vocals

Production

- Chris Boltendahl – producer, lyrics, cover concept
- Axel Ritt – producer, recording (guitars)
- Gyula Havancsák – artwork, cover art
- Jörg Umbreit – producer, engineering, recording, mixing, mastering
- Jens Howorka – photography

== Charts ==
Chart (2017)	Peak position
Belgian Albums (Ultratop Flanders)	78
Belgian Albums (Ultratop Wallonia)	105
German Albums (Offizielle Top 100)	15
Swiss Albums (Schweizer Hitparade)	45
