= The Clans Will Rise Again =

Studio album by Grave Digger
- Released: 1 October 2010
- Recorded: April–July 2010 at Principal Studios, Germany
- Genre: Heavy metal, power metal
- Label: Napalm
- Producer: Grave Digger

Grave Digger chronology
Ballads of a Hangman (2009)	The Clans Will Rise Again (2010)	Clash of the Gods (2012)

Professional ratings
Review scores
Source	Rating
BW&BK	(8.5/10)
Metal Hammer	(5/7)
Power of Metal	(85/100)
Lords of Metal	(90/100)

The Clans Will Rise Again is Grave Digger's 15th album under their new label Napalm Records. It is a "loose sequel" to their Tunes of War album. It was released on 1 October 2010. It is also the first album to feature guitarist Axel Ritt.

== Track listing ==
All lyrics are written by Chris Boltendahl; all music is composed by Chris Boltendahl, Axel Ritt and Jens Becker, except "Days of Revenge" by H.P. Katzenburg.

No.	Title	Length
1.	"Days of Revenge" (Intro)	1:58
2.	"Paid in Blood"	3:58
3.	"Hammer of the Scots"	4:02
4.	"Highland Farewell"	4:08
5.	"The Clans Will Rise Again"	5:01
6.	"Rebels"	4:41
7.	"Valley of Tears"	4:09
8.	"Execution"	4:46
9.	"Whom the Gods Love Die Young"	6:12
10.	"Spider"	3:19
11.	"The Piper McLeod" (Intro)	0:49
12.	"Coming Home"	4:23
13.	"When Rain Turns to Blood" (bonus track)	6:14
Total length:		57:35

Limited edition bonus track
No.	Title	Length
14.	"Watch Me Die"	3:55

== Personnel ==
- Chris Boltendahl - lead and backing vocals
- Axel Ritt - guitars and backing vocals
- Jens Becker - bass
- Stefan Arnold - drums
- H.P. Katzenburg - keyboards

== Charts ==
Chart	Peak position
German Albums Chart	28
