= Clash of the Gods (album) =

Studio album by Grave Digger
- Released: 31 August 2012 (EU); 11 September 2012 (US)
- Recorded: March–May 2012 at Principal Studios, Germany
- Genre: Heavy metal, power metal
- Label: Napalm
- Producer: Chris Boltendahl, Axel Ritt & Jörg Umbreit

Grave Digger chronology
The Clans Will Rise Again (2010)	Clash of the Gods (2012)	Return of the Reaper (2014)

Clash of the Gods is the 16th album from German heavy metal band Grave Digger, which was released on 31 August 2012 via Napalm Records.

== Track listing ==
All lyrics written by Chris Boltendahl.

No.	Title	Length
1.	"Charon (Fährmann des Todes)" (Intro)	2:19
2.	"God of Terror"	4:19
3.	"Hell Dog"	4:28
4.	"Medusa"	5:39
5.	"Clash of the Gods"	4:53
6.	"Death Angel and the Grave Digger"	4:22
7.	"Walls of Sorrow"	4:43
8.	"Call of the Sirens"	5:30
9.	"Warriors Revenge"	4:00
10.	"....With the Wind" (Intro)	0:48
11.	"Home at Last"	3:57

European limited edition bonus track
No.	Title	Length
1.	"Saints of the Broken Souls"	5:26
2.	"Zurück nach Haus" ("Home At Last" German Version)	4:01
Total length:		51:85

== Note ==
The Japanese, Russian and Brazilian editions contain the Home At Last EP.

== Charts ==
Chart	Peak position
German Albums Chart	29
Swedish Albums Chart	48
Swiss Albums Chart	71

== Personnel ==
- Chris Boltendahl - vocals
- Axel Ritt - guitars
- Jens Becker - bass
- Stefan Arnold - drums
- H.P. Katzenburg - keyboards

=== Additional musicians ===
- Hacky Hackmann - backing vocals
- Stefan Schmidt - backing vocals
- Ross Thompson - backing vocals
- Das Letzte Einhorn - lead vocals on "Charon (Fährmann des Todes)"

=== Production ===
- Jens Howorka - photography
- Gyula Havancsák - cover art, artwork
- Jörg Umbreit - producer, engineering, mixing, mastering
- Axel Ritt - producer, engineering
- Chris Boltendahl - producer, cover concept
- Loreley von Rhein - art model ("Death Angel")
