= Yesterday (Grave Digger EP) =

EP by Grave Digger
- Released: 29 September 2006
- Studio: Principal Studios, Germany
- Genre: Heavy Metal; Power Metal
- Label: Locomotive Music
- Producer: Chris Boltendahl, Manni Schmidt & Jörg Umbreit

Yesterday is an EP released by Grave Digger. It also contains a bonus DVD. The song "Yesterday" on this EP is a re-recorded version of the song from Grave Digger's debut album.

== Track listing ==
1. "Yesterday"
2. "The Reaper's Dance"
3. "No Quarter" (Led Zeppelin cover)
4. "Yesterday (Orchestral Version)"

=== Live at the Rock Machina festival, 2001, DVD ===
1. "Intro
2. "Scotland United"
3. "The Dark of the Sun"
4. "The Reaper"
5. "The Round Table"
6. "Excalibur"
7. "Circle of Witches"
8. "Symphony of Death"
9. "Lionheart"
10. "Morgane Lefay"
11. "Knights of the Cross"
12. "Rebellion"
13. "Heavy Metal Breakdown"

== Personnel ==
- Chris Boltendahl - Vocals
- Manni Schmidt - guitars
- Jens Becker - bass
- Stefan Arnold - drums
- H.P. Katzenburg - keyboards
