= Rebellion (band) =

German power metal band

- Origin: Germany
- Genres: Power metal, heavy metal
- Years active: 2001–present
- Labels: Massacre Records
- Members: Michael Seifert; Tomi Göttlich; Martin Giemza; Fabrizio Costantino; Sven Tost
- Past members: Uwe Lulis; Randy Black; Björn Eilen; Gerd Lücking; Simone Wenzel; Oliver Geibig; Stephan Karut; Matthias Karle
- Website: rebellion-metal.de

Rebellion is a German power metal band. It was formed in 2001 when guitarist Uwe Lulis left Grave Digger in 2000, taking ex-Grave Digger bassist Tomi Göttlich with him.

== History ==
The band's first album was a concept album about William Shakespeare's work Macbeth, and included spoken passages with members of the band and other people as the story's characters.

The second album involved more standard heavy metal lyrics—about motorcycles, metal, war, etc.—and the music was somewhat rougher.

In 2005, the band released the first part of what is intended to be a trilogy about the Vikings and Norse mythology. In the beginning of 2007, they released their second part in the trilogy about the Vikings. It was titled Miklagard and was the band's most successful album so far. In 2009, they released the album Arise: From Ginnungagap to Ragnarök, the third and last part of the trilogy.

Ex-drummer Randy Black is now playing in Primal Fear; ex-guitarist Björn Eilen is playing in Silver Maiden and The Talkies.

In late 2010, three members of the band, Uwe Lulis, Gerd Lücking, and Simone Wenzel, departed, leaving the remaining two members with the band.

In the COVID years, Rebellion found themselves with three seasoned songwriters in the form of Thomas Göttlich and new guitarists Martin Giemza and Fabrizio Costantino. With no concerts to play, they started forging the ninth album, We Are the People. In the aftermath of COVID, Rebellion quickly started touring again while concert halls were just slowly were starting to be crowded again. Their latest album X – Live in Iberia is a raw, mostly unedited recording of this experience.

== Members ==
- Michael Seifert — vocals (2001–present)
- Tomi Göttlich — bass (2001–present)
- Martin Giemza — guitars (2019–present)
- Fabrizio Costantino — guitars (2020–present)
- Sven Tost — drums (2020–present)

=== Former ===
- Stephan Karut — guitars (2011–2020)
- Oliver Geibig — guitars (2011–2019)
- Tommy Telkemeier — drums (2016–2020)
- Björn Eilen — guitars (2001–2005)
- Randy Black — drums (2001–2003)
- Uwe Lulis — guitars (2001–2010)
- Simone Wenzel — guitars (2005–2010)
- Gerd Lücking — drums (2004–2010)
- Matthias Karle — drums (2011–2013)
- Timo Schneider — drums (2013–2016)

== Discography ==
=== Albums ===
- Shakespeare's Macbeth – A Tragedy in Steel (2002)
- Born a Rebel (2003)
- Sagas of Iceland – The History of the Vikings Volume 1 (2005)
- Miklagard – The History of the Vikings Volume 2 (2007)
- Arise: From Ginnungagap to Ragnarök – The History of the Vikings Volume III (2009)
- Arminius – Furor Teutonicus (2012)
- Wyrd bið ful aræd – The History of the Saxons (2015)
- A Tragedy in Steel Part II: Shakespeare's King Lear (2018)
- We Are the People (2021)
- X – Live in Iberia (2023)

=== Other releases ===
- "Miklagard" (single, 2006)
- The Clans Are Marching (EP, 2009)

Music videos

- "Miklagard" (2006)
