= Liberty or Death (album) =

Studio album by Grave Digger
- Released: 15 January 2007
- Recorded: August–October 2006 at Principal Studios, Germany
- Genre: Heavy metal, power metal
- Length: 56:48
- Label: Locomotive Music
- Producer: Chris Boltendahl, Manni Schmidt & Jörg Umbreit

Grave Digger chronology
The Last Supper (2005)	Liberty or Death (2007)	Ballads of a Hangman (2009)

Liberty or Death is the 13th studio album by German heavy metal band Grave Digger. It was released on 15 January 2007 via Locomotive Records.

== Track listing ==
All songs composed and arranged by Boltendahl/Becker/Schmidt and Katzenburg; all lyrics by Boltendahl.

No.	Title	Length
1.	"Liberty or Death"	6:33
2.	"Ocean of Blood"	4:12
3.	"Highland Tears"	6:15
4.	"The Terrible One"	4:08
5.	"Until the Last King Died"	5:46
6.	"March of the Innocent"	5:56
7.	"Silent Revolution"	6:24
8.	"Shadowland"	6:26
9.	"Forecourt to Hell"	5:02
10.	"Massada"	5:58

Digipak Bonus Track
No.	Title	Length
11.	"Ship of Hope"	5:05

Special edition Disc 2: Yesterday
No.	Title	Length
1.	"Yesterday (2006)"	5:19
2.	"The Reapers Dance"	4:35
3.	"No Quarter" (Led Zeppelin cover)	6:57
4.	"Yesterday" (Orchestra Version)	4:07

== Lyrical themes ==
- Vocalist Chris Boltendahl was inspired with this album by the book named "Liberty Or Death" by the Cretean writer Nikos Kazantzakis, whose title is the English translation of Eleftheria i thanatos. The book directly inspired the title song about the Greek revolution on Crete, with lyrical references to the Greek national anthem.
- Two songs deal with Germany's treatment of the Jews in the Second World War and a further two more about more Ancient Jewish history. "Ocean of Blood" tells of Moses parting the Red Sea and "Massada" tells of the siege of Masada at the end of the First Jewish-Roman War. "March of the Innocent" is about the Holocaust and "Ship of Hope" tells of the "Voyage of the Damned" of the SS St. Louis. Boltendahl said that the number of songs on this subject was not intended, but that the stories were interesting on their own.
- "Highland Tears" deals with freedom in Scotland. "Forecourt to Hell" deals with the gladiators in the Roman Empire age. "The Terrible One" is about Ivan the Terrible. "Until the Last King Died" is about the French Revolution, "Shadowland" about the atrocities of the Ku Klux Klan in the USA and "Silent Revolution" deals with Mahatma Gandhi's non-violent struggle against the oppression of the Indian people.

== Album line-up ==
- Chris Boltendahl - vocals
- Manni Schmidt - guitars
- Jens Becker - bass
- Stefan Arnold - drums
- HP Katzenburg - keyboards
