= Grave Digger (band) =

German heavy metal band

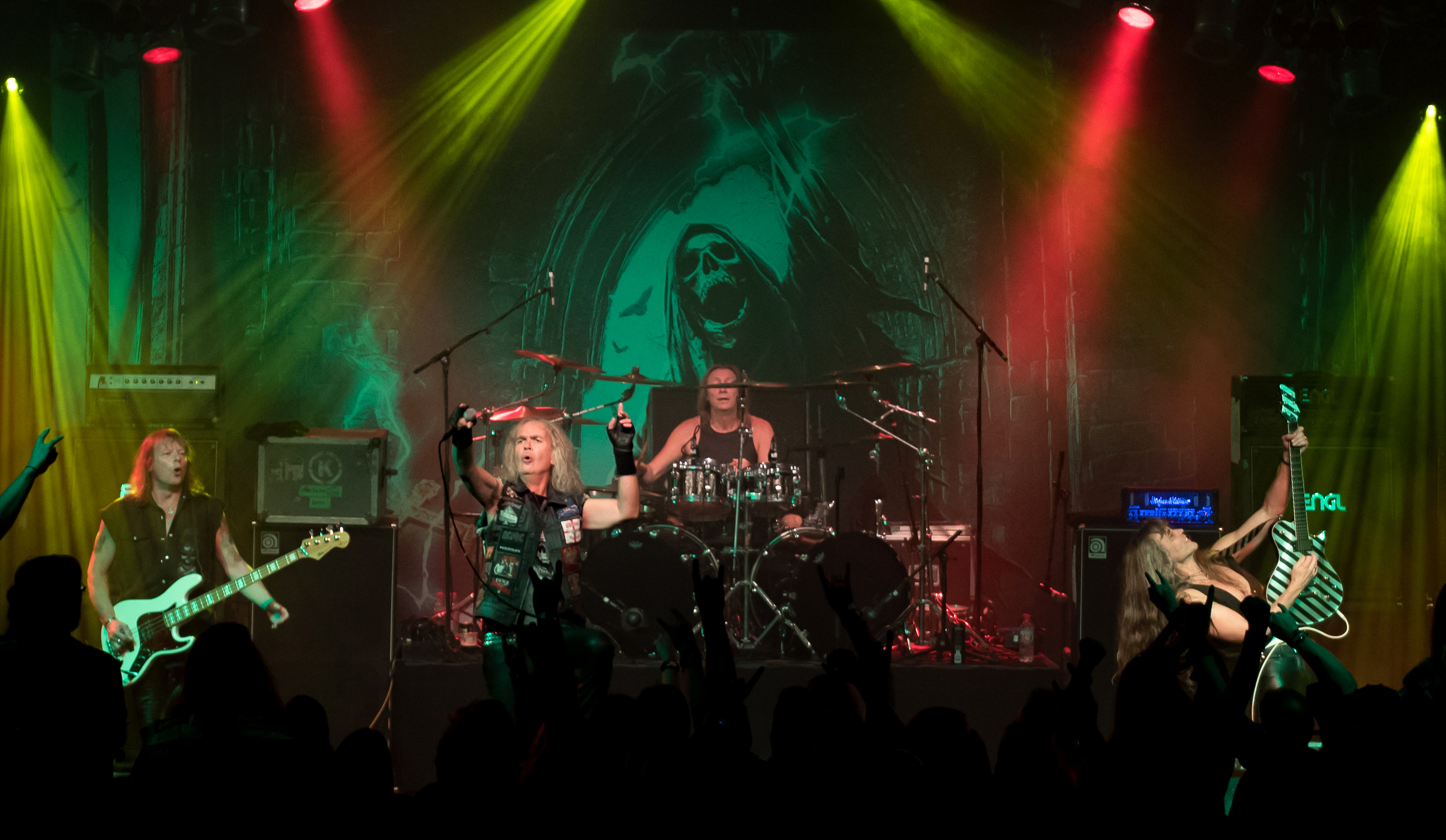
- Grave Digger performing in 2017

Background information
- Also known as: Digger (1986–1987), Hawaii (1988–1991)
- Origin: Gladbeck, West Germany
- Genres: Heavy metal; power metal
- Years active: 1980–1987; 1988–present
- Labels: Napalm; Nuclear Blast; Noise; Locomotive; Rock of Angels
- Members: Chris Boltendahl; Tobias Kersting; Jens Becker; Marcus Kniep
- Past members: Lutz Schmelzer; Peter Masson; Philip Seibel; Martin Gerlitzki; Willi Lackman; Albert Eckardt; C.F. Frank; Peter Breitenbach; Tomi Göttlich; Uwe Lulis; Jörg Michael; Frank Ulrich; Manni Schmidt; Thilo Hermann; Hans Peter "H.P." Katzenburg; Stefan Arnold; Axel Ritt
- Website: grave-digger-clan.com

Grave Digger is a German heavy metal band that was first formed in 1980 by Chris Boltendahl and Peter Masson. Emerging from the 1980s German heavy/power/speed metal scene, they are considered part of the scene's "big four" alongside Helloween, Rage and Running Wild.

== Band history ==
=== Early years and split (1980–1990) ===
After various appearances at small festivals, the band recorded two songs for the compilation album Rock from Hell in 1983. A year later, Grave Digger, now comprising Chris Boltendahl (vocals), Peter Masson (guitar), Willi Lackmann (bass) and Albert Eckardt (drums), released their debut album Heavy Metal Breakdown.

In 1985, with Lackmann having left the band, they recorded and released their second album Witch Hunter. Only after the album was completed, a replacement on bass was found in the form of C.F. Brank. Further festival appearances followed, a tour with Helloween as special guest and, finally, their third album War Games in January 1986. To promote this album, a triple headline tour with Celtic Frost and Helloween followed. Thereafter, Peter Masson gave way to Uwe Lulis; in 1987 the band's name was changed to Digger, the name under which they released the album Stronger Than Ever. The album flopped, as it was not accepted by fans or the masses. As a result, Boltendahl declared at the end of 1987, the breakup of the band. Boltendahl and Lulis started performing under a different band name, Hawaii, in 1988.

=== Reformation and Middle Ages Trilogy (1991–1999) ===
In 1991, Grave Digger was partially reformed. Boltendahl and Lulis, along with two newcomers, Tomi Göttlich and Jörg Michael, who had been the drummer for Rage and Running Wild, released a comeback record called The Reaper in 1993. This album was a return to the true roots of Grave Digger. In the same year, the album The Best of the Eighties was released. It represented a quasi Best-of-Album of their earlier songs.

An EP titled Symphony of Death followed in 1994. In the interim, Grave Digger, now with a new drummer, Frank Ullrich, toured Germany, playing as the warm-up act for Manowar. In 1995, the album Heart of Darkness appeared. It was a very dark album with many influences from the early works of Annihilator.

In 1996, Stefan Arnold became the band's new drummer. This year also marked the release of the concept album Tunes of War, which dealt with the history of Scotland. This album was the first part of the Middle Ages Trilogy. The second album, Knights of the Cross, with Jens Becker as bass guitarist, was released in 1998 and was about the rise and fall of the Knights Templar. The final part of the trilogy finished in 1999 with Excalibur. This album explored the legend of King Arthur and the Knights of the Round Table. Shortly after, a tour soon followed through with keyboardist Hans-Peter Katzenburg, who later became a permanent band member.

=== The Grave Digger and Rheingold (2000–2004) ===
In 2000, Grave Digger celebrated their 20th anniversary. To mark the occasion, they performed at a sell-out concert at the Zeche in Bochum. Many of the band's most popular songs were played alongside other less well-known ones. There were also a number of different supporting acts appearing with Grave Digger. This concert also marked a defining chapter in the band's history, as Uwe Lulis left a short while before the concert because of personal and business reasons. Lulis finally called his new band Rebellion.

A replacement, in the form of the ex-Rage guitarist, Manni Schmidt, was found. Along with him and the new record label Nuclear Blast, the album The Grave Digger, appeared in 2001. The works of Edgar Allan Poe served as an inspiration for the lyrics of the new album. Their first live album, Tunes of Wacken, appeared in 2002. This was coupled with the release of their first DVD of the same name. The next album Rheingold was released on 26 May 2003, which centered on the opera Der Ring des Nibelungen by Richard Wagner. They embarked on a tour in support of the album into early 2004.

=== The Last Supper and Ballads of a Hangman (2005–2009) ===
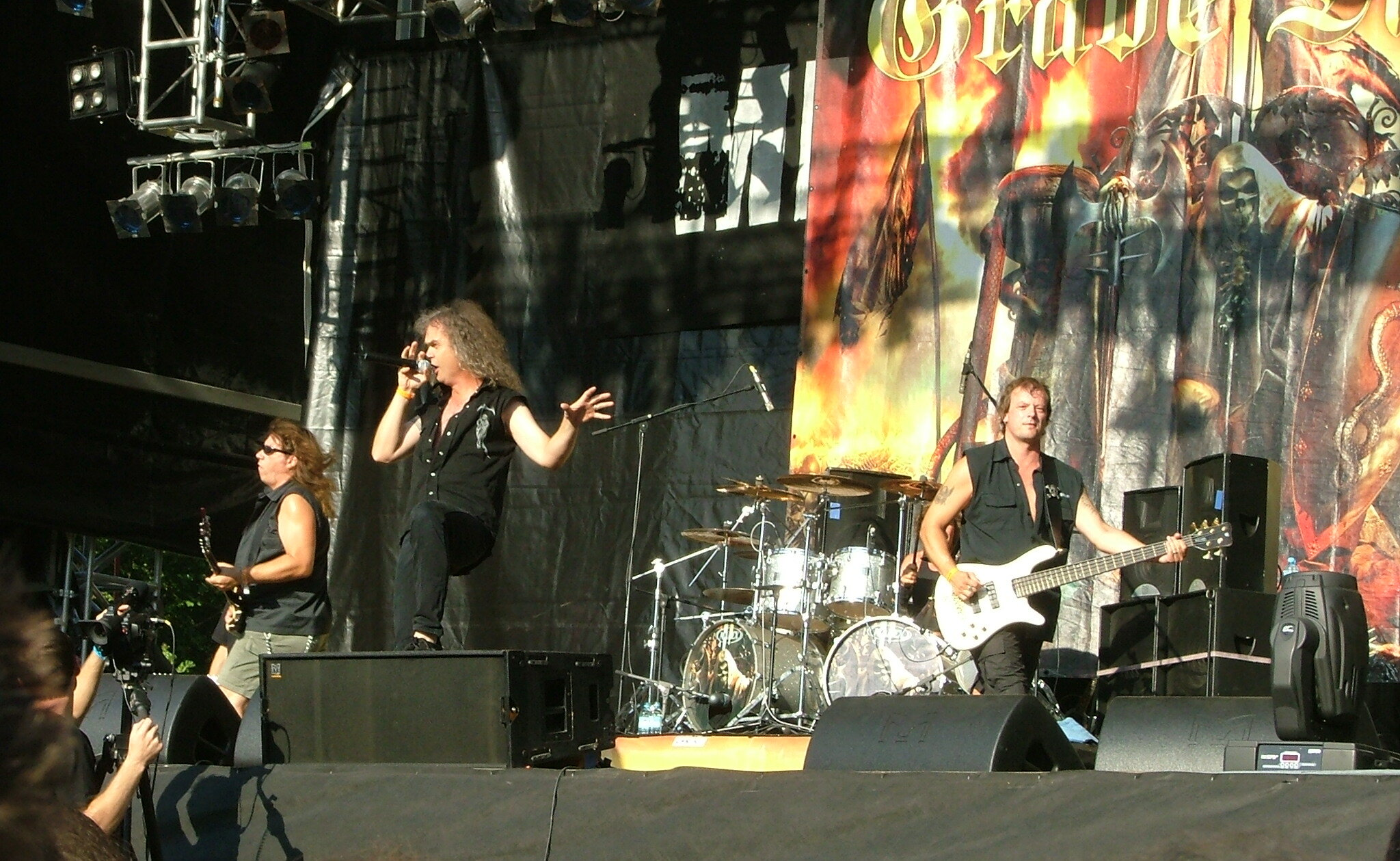
Grave Digger at Metalcamp 2007

After the successful Rheingold Tour, the band recorded another album, The Last Supper, which was released on 17 January 2005. The artwork was first revealed in November 2004 which received positive feedback. A number of fans were disappointed by the artwork because of the motive. The band issued a statement saying that the cover isn't a message of the Devil and not against Christians, but a representation of a depressive Jesus Christ at his last days before his death. Unlike their previous albums, The Last Supper was not a concept album, despite several songs about the last days of Jesus. A few journalists described the album as the best since Tunes of War or Heavy Metal Breakdown. According to the band, it contains "more metal, more passion and more power" than the group's previous efforts. Less than a month later, the band began a tour with Stormhammer and Astral Doors in Andernach, the birthplace of Manni Schmidt.

October 2005 saw the release of a live DVD titled 25 to Live, which was recorded live in São Paulo, commemorating the band's 25th anniversary.

In December 2006, a number of release parties was announced for the band's follow-up album, Liberty or Death, which was released on 12 January 2007. A Double-Headline Tour together with Therion followed, beginning 17 January 2007 in Essen. Grave Digger played at Wacken Open Air in August 2007.

In late February 2008, Grave Digger began writing new material. In mid-August, they entered Principal studios with additional guitarist Thilo Hermann to record their 13th studio album entitled Ballads of a Hangman, which was released on 9 January 2009 under their new label Napalm Records. It was their first album with twin guitars.

In February 2009, the band parted ways with Thilo Hermann due to the built up excitement of a second guitarist and with the free space on stage and musical aspects that was observed by every old band member independently. Naturally, this makes no sense. In early October, Manni Schmidt left the band due to ongoing disagreements with Chris Boltendahl.

=== The Clans Will Rise Again and The Living Dead (2010–2018) ===
On 12 January 2010, Schmidt was replaced by Domain guitarist Axel Ritt after performing temporarily during the remaining dates of the band's previous tour. On 1 October 2010, Grave Digger released the album The Clans Will Rise Again in Europe, with a North American release following soon after. The band members explain that it is a loose sequel of the 1996 album Tunes of War, "but this time not a concept album about the Scottish history, rather a work about Scotland, its mysticism and its people." On 11 September 2011, a video for the song "Highland Farewell" was made available for streaming.

On 27 July 2012, the band released an EP entitled Home at Last with the album Clash of the Gods following on 31 August 2012. They performed a handful of shows in the UK and Europe from early to late 2012 and then toured throughout 2013 in Europe and a few shows in Brazil in support of the album.

In February 2014, the band began recording their next album titled Return of the Reaper, which was released on 11 July 2014, with later release dates elsewhere. In November 2014, keyboardist H.P. Katzenburg left the band in order to spend more time on outside projects. He was replaced by new member Marcus Kniep, who would continue performing as The Reaper.

In October 2015, Exhumation – The Early Years was released, which contains re-recorded versions of the band's "absolute classics with a dynamic and powerful sound of 2015," according to a press release.

In June 2016, Grave Digger entered the studio to begin working on their next album entitled Healed by Metal, which was released on 13 January 2017. They embarked on a tour with Blind Guardian as the support act on the second leg North American tour supporting the album Beyond the Red Mirror.

In March 2018, the band returned to the studio to record their nineteenth album The Living Dead, which was released on 14 September 2018, with a European tour taking place in January 2019. On 25 June 2018, longtime drummer Stefan Arnold departed the band. He was replaced by Marcus Kniep.

=== Fields of Blood, Symbol of Eternity, Bone Collector and Faces of Pain (2020–present) ===
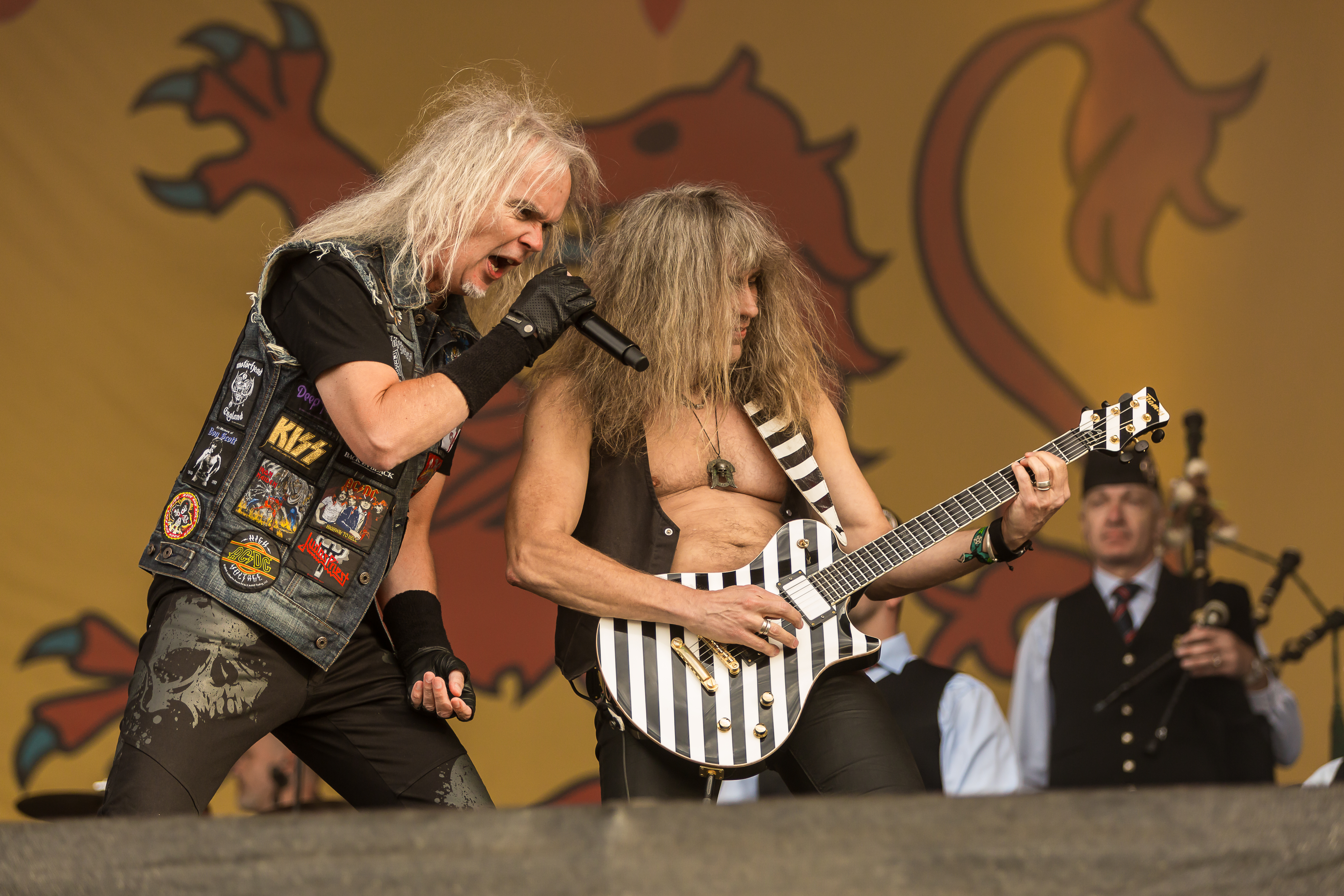
Grave Digger at Rockharz Open Air 2022

Grave Digger's twentieth album Fields of Blood was released on 29 May 2020, celebrating the band's 40th anniversary. The follow-up album Symbol of Eternity was released on 26 August 2022. On 10 September 2023, the band announced the departure of guitarist Axel Ritt. He was replaced with former Orden Ogan guitarist Tobias Kersting. The 22nd studio album Bone Collector was released on 17 January 2025 in celebration of the band's 45th anniversary. A music video for the single "Kingdom of Skulls" was released on 11 October 2024. A standalone single from the album's recording sessions titled Bark to Hell was released on 27 June 2025. Their next studio album, Faces of Pain, is due for release on 15 January 2027.

== Band members ==
Current

- Chris Boltendahl — vocals (1980–present), bass (1980–1983, 1984, 1985)
- Jens Becker — bass (1997–present)
- Marcus "Gravey" Kniep — drums (2018–present), keyboards (2014–present)
- Tobias "Tobi" Kersting — guitars (2023–present)

== Discography ==
=== Studio albums ===
- Heavy Metal Breakdown (1984)
- Witch Hunter (1985)
- War Games (1986)
- Stronger Than Ever (1986) (as Digger)
- The Reaper (1993)
- Heart of Darkness (1995)
- Tunes of War (1996)
- Knights of the Cross (1998)
- Excalibur (1999)
- The Grave Digger (2001)
- Rheingold (2003)
- The Last Supper (2005)
- Liberty or Death (2007)
- Ballads of a Hangman (2009)
- The Clans Will Rise Again (2010)
- Clash of the Gods (2012)
- Return of the Reaper (2014)
- Healed by Metal (2017)
- The Living Dead (2018)
- Fields of Blood (2020)
- Symbol of Eternity (2022)
- Bone Collector (2025)
- Faces of Pain (2027)

=== Live albums ===
- Tunes of Wacken – Live (2002)
- 25 to Live (2005)
- The Clans Are Still Marching (2011)

=== Compilation albums ===
- The Best of the Eighties (1993)
- Die definitive Biografie (2002)
- The History – Part One (2002)
- Masterpieces – Best of Album (2002)
- Lost Tunes from the Vault (2003)
- Exhumation – The Early Years (2015)
- Let Your Heads Roll - The Very Best of the Noise Years 1984-1986 (2016)
- The Forgotten Years (2023)

=== EPs and singles ===
- 1982 Grave Digger Demo (1982)
- Born Again Demo (1983)
- Shoot Her Down (1984)
- 1991 Grave Digger Demo (1991)
- For Promotion Only (1992)
- Symphony of Death (1994)
- Rebellion (1996)
- The Dark of the Sun (1997)
- The Battle of Bannockburn (1998)
- The Round Table (Forever) (1999)
- Rheingold (2003)
- Yesterday (2006)
- Silent Revolution (2006)
- Pray (2008)
- Ballads of a Hangman (2009)
- The Ballad of Mary (2011)
- Home at Last (2012)
- Healed by Metal (2016)
- Call for War (2016)
- The Grave Is Yours (2024)
- Hell Is My Purgatory (Hellfire 2024) (2024)
- Kingdom of Skulls (2024)
- Bark to Hell (2025)

=== Box sets ===
- The Middle Ages Trilogy (2002)

=== Participation ===
- The Music Remains the Same: A Tribute to Led Zeppelin (2002)

=== Music videos ===
- Circle of Witches (1995)
- Rebellion (The Clans Are Marching) (1996)
- Dark of the Sun (1997)
- Valhalla (2003)
- The Last Supper (2005)
- Pray (2008)
- Ballad of a Hangman (2008)
- Highland Farewell (2010)
- Home at Last (2012)
- Zurück nach Haus (German version of Home at Last) (2012)
- Hell Funeral (2014)
- Heavy Metal Breakdown (2015)
- Healed By Metal (2016)
- Lawbreaker (2017)
- Zombie Dance (feat. Russkaja) (2018)
- Thousand Tears (feat. Noora Louhimo) (2020)
- Lions of the Sea (2020)
- Hell Is My Purgatory (2022)
- King of the Kings (2022)
- Kingdom of Skulls (2024)
- The Devils Serenade (2024)

=== Lyric videos ===
- Season of the Witch (2014)
- Call for War (2016)
- Fear of the Living Dead (2018)
- The Power of Metal (2018)
- All for the Kingdom (2020)
- Barbarian (2020)
- Battle Cry (2022)
