= Heart of Darkness (Grave Digger album) =

Studio album by Grave Digger
- Released: 3 April 1995
- Recorded: Principal Studios in Senden, Münster, Germany; Mastered at EMI in Cologne, Germany; Choir recorded and mixed at Interface Studios in Cologne, Germany
- Genre: Heavy metal, power metal
- Label: GUN Records
- Producer: Chris Boltendahl & Uwe Lulis

Grave Digger chronology
The Reaper (1993)	Heart of Darkness (1995)	Tunes of War (1996)

Heart of Darkness is the sixth studio album by German heavy metal band Grave Digger. They showed a much darker sound with this release than any of their previous albums. All of the songs have dark, lyrical concepts such as hate, death, betrayal, etc. The title track is inspired by the Joseph Conrad's novella Heart of Darkness. A music video was made for "Circle of Witches".

== Track listing ==
All lyrics written by Chris Boltendahl and Tomi Göttlich, except where noted; All music written by Chris Boltendahl and Uwe Lulis except where noted.

No.	Title	Lyrics	Music	Length
1.	"Tears of Madness" (Intro)		Rudy Kronenberger	2:09
2.	"Shadowmaker"			5:39
3.	"The Grave Dancer"	Boltendahl, Göttlich, Lulis		5:02
4.	"Demon's Day"			7:29
5.	"Warchild"			6:09
6.	"Heart of Darkness"		Boltendahl, Lulis, Eric Ingversen	11:56
7.	"Hate"	Boltendahl, Göttlich, Lulis		4:23
8.	"Circle of Witches"		Boltendahl, Göttlich, Lulis	7:43
9.	"Black Death"			5:40
Total length:				56:10

Limited edition bonus tracks
No.	Title	Length
1.	"My Life"	5:07
2.	"Dolphin's Cry"	6:00
Total length:		67:17

The limited edition release is limited to 6,666 copies.

Japanese edition bonus tracks
No.	Title	Length
1.	"Dolphin's Cry"	6:00
2.	"Don't Bring Me Down"	5:35
Total length:		67:45

== Credits ==
Band members

- Chris Boltendahl - vocals
- Uwe Lulis - guitars
- Tomi Göttlich - bass
- Frank Ullrich - drums

Additional musicians

- Peter Diersmann - backing vocals
- Michael Seifert - backing vocals
- Rudy Kronenberger - keyboards
- Konzertchor Koln - choir on "Heart of Darkness"

Production

- Mathias Bothor - photography
- Marc Manthey - engineering, mixing (choirs) on "Heart of Darkness"
- Tomi Göttlich - producer (lead vocals)
- Chris Boltendahl - producer, cover concept, engineering, mixing (choirs) on "Heart of Darkness"
- Uwe Lulis - engineering (additional overdubs), producer
- Suno Fabitch - engineering, mixing
- John Cremer - mastering
- Andreas Marschall - cover art
