= Kilmister =

Kilmister is a surname of English origin. People with that surname include:

- Clive W. Kilmister (1924–2010), British mathematician who specialised in the mathematical foundations of physics
- Ian Fraser Kilmister (better known as Lemmy; 1945–2015), English bass-player, singer, and songwriter
- Wally Kilmister (1908–1973), New Zealand speedway rider
