= Excalibur (Grave Digger album) =

Studio album by Grave Digger
- Released: 6 September 1999
- Recorded: May–June 1999 at Principal Studios, Senden, Münster, Germany; Mastered at Masterdisk, New York City
- Genre: Heavy metal, power metal
- Label: GUN Records
- Producer: Chris Boltendahl and Uwe Lulis

Grave Digger chronology
Knights of the Cross (1998)	Excalibur (1999)	The Grave Digger (2001)

Excalibur is the ninth studio album by German heavy metal band Grave Digger. It is the final album of the Middle Ages Trilogy, as well as the last to feature guitarist Uwe Lulis. It tells about the story of King Arthur and the knights of the round table.

== Track listing ==
All lyrics by Chris Boltendahl and Yvonne Thorhauer. Music by Boltendahl and Lulis except where noted.

No.	Title	Music	Length
1.	"The Secrets of Merlin"		2:38
2.	"Pendragon"		4:20
3.	"Excalibur"		4:45
4.	"The Round Table (Forever)"		5:10
5.	"Morgane le Fay"		5:16
6.	"The Spell"		4:38
7.	"Tristan's Fate"	Boltendahl, Lulis, Becker	3:38
8.	"Lancelot"		4:45
9.	"Mordred's Song"	Boltendahl, Lulis, Becker	4:00
10.	"The Final War"		4:02
11.	"Emerald Eyes"	Boltendahl, Katzenburg	4:04
12.	"Avalon"		5:50
Total length:			53:06

Digipak bonus track
No.	Title	Length
13.	"Parcival"	4:59
Total length:		58:05

== Lyrical content ==
- The album is about the King Arthur's mythology.
- "Pendragon" is about Uther Pendragon, father of Arthur.
- "Excalibur" is about the powerful sword handled by Arthur.
- "The Round Table (Forever)" deals with the principles of the Knights of the Round Table.
- "Morgane Le Fay" is about the witch Morgane.
- "The Spell" is about the enchantment that Nimue used on Merlin to gain his powers, after a promise of sex and love.
- "Tristan's Fate" is about the tragic history of Tristan and Isolde. Tristan here is a knight of the round table. (In some tales, he's not even connected to Arthur)
- "Lancelot" is about the love of Lancelot (Arthur's knight) for Guinevere (Arthur's wife).
- "Mordred's Song" is about the treachery of Mordred.
- "The Final War" is about the last battle of Arthur and Mordred. Arthur ends mortally wounded.
- "Emerald Eyes" is Arthur's last words to Guinevere.
- "Avalon" is about the fantastic island that Arthur went, where he died.
- "Parcival" is about the knight Parcival and his quest for the Holy Grail.

== Credits ==
Band members

- Chris Boltendahl - vocals
- Uwe Lulis - guitars
- Jens Becker - bass
- Stefan Arnold - drums
- H.P. Katzenburg - keyboards

Additional musicians

- Eric Hecht - bagpipes
- Hansi Kürsch - backing vocals
- Hacky Hackmann - backing vocals
- Piet Sielck - backing vocals
- Bodenski - hurdy-gurdy

Production

- Markus Mayer - cover art
- Jens Rosendahl - photography
- Chris Boltendahl - producer
- Uwe Lulis - producer, mixing, engineering
- Suno Fabitch - mixing, engineering
- Roger Lian - mastering
