= Bone Collector (album) =

Studio album by Grave Digger
- Released: 17 January 2025
- Recorded: 2024
- Studio: Graveyard Studios, Cologne, Germany
- Genre: Heavy metal, power metal
- Length: 46:43
- Label: Rock Of Angels Records
- Producer: Chris Boltendahl

Grave Digger chronology
Symbol of Eternity (2022)	Bone Collector (2025)

Professional ratings
Review scores
Source	Rating
Blabbermouth.net	8.5/10
Distorted Sound	7/10
Ghost Cult Magazine	8/10

Bone Collector is the twenty-second studio album by German heavy metal band Grave Digger, released on 17 January 2025 by Rock Of Angels Records, in celebration of the band's 45th anniversary. A music video for the single "Kingdom of Skulls" was released on 11 October 2024, along with "The Devils Serenade" on 20 December 2024 and the title track on the day of the album's release. This is the first album to feature new guitarist Tobias "Tobi" Kersting, who replaced previous guitarist Axel Ritt in late 2023. The album has received positive reviews from critics.

== Track listing ==
No.	Title	Length
1.	"Bone Collector"	4:19
2.	"The Rich, the Poor, the Dying"	3:25
3.	"Kingdom of Skulls"	3:44
4.	"The Devil's Serenade"	4:01
5.	"Killing Is My Pleasure"	3:29
6.	"Mirror of Hate"	4:40
7.	"Riders of Doom"	4:55
8.	"Made of Madness"	3:59
9.	"Graveyard Kings"	4:16
10.	"Forever Evil and Buried Alive"	3:34
11.	"Whispers of the Damned"	6:21

== Personnel ==
- Chris Boltendahl – vocals
- Tobias "Tobi" Kersting – guitar
- Jens Becker – bass guitar
- Marcus Kniep – drums, keyboards

== Charts ==
Chart performance for Bone Collector
Chart (2025)	Peak position
Austrian Albums (Ö3 Austria)	25
German Albums (Offizielle Top 100)	13
Greek Albums (IFPI)	19
