= Bone collecting =

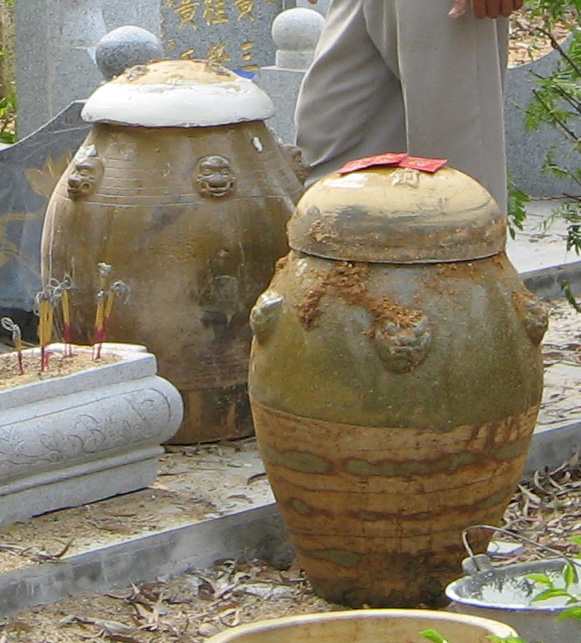
Gam Ta-Bone urns.

Bone collecting (Cantonese Jyutping: Zap1 gwat1; Traditional Chinese: 拾骨, literally "to collect the bones") is a burial ritual practiced in certain parts of East Asia. Peoples known to adopt some forms of this custom include Cantonese, Vietnamese, Hoklo, Taiwanese, Ryukyuan, and Zhuang. Most of these groups are related to Baiyue, and indeed ancient Han Chinese had literature that documented such customs being practiced by various Baiyue tribes.

== Practice ==
=== Cantonese traditions ===
Among Cantonese, the standard practice of bone collecting involves first unearthing a coffin with a dead body that has been buried for at least five years (thus can be expected to have largely decomposed), and then leaving the coffin partly open in order to let out the stench of decay. As the stench became bearable, the dead person's offspring would, using Cantonese, formally asked the dead person to "wake up" (Jyutping: Hei2 san1 laa3; Traditional Chinese: 起身喇). After some rituals, the "bone collector", a person specifically trained to do this ritual, would respectfully and carefully collect the bones from the coffin (hence the name "bone collecting"). The next step involves cleaning and drying the bones, which usually takes at least four to five days. The final part of the ritual depends on the offspring's will: They may want to grind the bones into ashes, or put them into containers called "golden towers" (Jyutping: Gam1 taap3; Traditional Chinese: 金塔, literally "golden tower"). These containers will then be put in the countryside or cemetery for a peaceful rest. In Cantonese customs, choices of where to put the golden towers may be dependent on Feng shui.

In Hong Kong and Macau, it is legally mandated that bone collecting must be conducted after 6 to 7 years of burial on land.

== See also ==
- Chinese funeral rituals
- Cremation
- Cantonese culture
