= Tunes of Wacken – Live =

Tunes of Wacken

Live album by Grave Digger
- Released: 25 March 2002
- Genre: Heavy metal, power metal
- Label: GUN
- Producer: Chris Boltendahl

Grave Digger chronology
The Grave Digger (2001)	Tunes of Wacken (2002)	Rheingold (2003)

Tunes of Wacken – Live is a live music album by German heavy metal band Grave Digger, recorded on 4 August 2001 at Wacken Open Air. It was also released on DVD.

== Track listing ==
1. "Intro"
2. "Scotland United"
3. "The Dark of the Sun"
4. "The Reaper"
5. "The Round Table (Forever)"
6. "Excalibur"
7. "Circle of Witches"
8. "The Ballad of Mary (Queen of Scots)"
9. "Lionheart"
10. "Morgane Le Fay"
11. "Knights of the Cross"
12. "Rebellion (The Clans Are Marching)"
13. "Heavy Metal Breakdown"

== Personnel ==
- Chris Boltendahl - vocals
- Manni Schmidt - guitars
- Jens Becker - bass
- Stefan Arnold - drums
- HP Katzenburg - keyboards
