= Knights of the Cross (album) =

Studio album by Grave Digger
- Released: 18 May 1998
- Recorded: February–March 1998 at Principal Studios, Senden/Münster, Germany
- Genre: Heavy metal, power metal
- Label: GUN Records
- Producer: Chris Boltendahl & Uwe Lulis

Grave Digger chronology
Tunes of War (1996)	Knights of the Cross (1998)	Excalibur (1999)

Knights of the Cross is the eighth studio album by German heavy metal band Grave Digger. It was released in 1998. It is the second album of the Middle Ages Trilogy, and the first Grave Digger album to feature former Running Wild bassist Jens Becker.

== Track listing ==
All songs composed and arranged by Chris Boltendahl and Uwe Lulis except where noted. All lyrics by Boltendahl and Yvonne Thorhauer.

No.	Title	Music	Length
1.	"Deus lo Vult"	Hans Peter Katzenburg	2:28
2.	"Knights of the Cross"		4:35
3.	"Monks of War"		3:38
4.	"Heroes of This Time"		4:10
5.	"Fanatic Assassins"		3:40
6.	"Lionheart"		4:33
7.	"The Keeper of the Holy Grail"		5:57
8.	"Inquisition"		3:47
9.	"Baphomet"		4:12
10.	"Over the Sea"		3:51
11.	"The Curse of Jacques"		4:52
12.	"The Battle of Bannockburn"		6:42
Total length:			52:25

Digipak bonus track
No.	Title	Lyrics	Length
1.	"Children of the Grave" (Black Sabbath cover)	Ozzy Osbourne, Tony Iommi, Geezer Butler, Bill Ward	4:28
Total length:			56:51

Japanese edition bonus tracks
No.	Title	Lyrics	Length
1.	"Kill the King" (Rainbow cover)	Ritchie Blackmore, Ronnie James Dio, Cozy Powell	4:27
2.	"Children of the Grave" (Black Sabbath cover)	Osbourne, Iommi, Butler, Ward	4:26
Total length:			1:01:18

== The story ==
It is mentioned in the first track, Deus lo Vult, that "this is the fascinating tale of the Templars, probably the most powerful and mysterious organisations of the Middle Ages. The Order of The Poor Knights Of Christ and the Temple Of Solomon, originate from a group of nine Aristocrates, whose sole aim was the protection of the Holy Land. So let us undertake a journey into the past, back to the origin, rise and fall of the Order of the Templars. A journey, which will lead as to the legendary world of the Knights of the Cross."

The album tells the story of the Knights Templar from the times of the Order's birth in 1119, through the years of its glory, and finally to its fall in 1312. The first song describes the First Crusade organised in the West after Muslim victories in Asia Minor over the weakening forces of Byzantine Empire ("Deus Lo Vult", "Knights of the Cross"). Subsequent songs mention the foundation of the Knights Templar by French knight Hugues de Payens in 1119 after the establishing of the Kingdom of Jerusalem ("Monks of War"), and the new danger to the Franks brought some time later by Saladin's Egyptian armies and Nizari sect of Hashashim ("Heroes Of This Time", "Fanatic Assassins"). Then the album deals with cruelties of the Third Crusade led by Richard I of England and Philip Augustus of France ("Lionheart"), and with the myth of Templars holding the Holy Grail ("Keeper Of The Holy Grail"). The next four songs deals with the tragic end of the Order: putting hundreds of Knights Templar under arrest in 1307 to face the Inquisition on false accusations by French king Philip the Fair of heresy and homosexual practices within the Order ("Inquisition"), prisoners' statements - forced under torture - about worshipping the demon Baphomet which led to Order's cancellation by Pope Clement V in 1312 ("Baphomet"), the escape of some former Templar Knights into Scotland ("Over the Sea"), and the execution of Order's last Grand Master Jacques de Molay in 1314, who was believed to curse the King and the Pope from his stake while being burned alive, so both of them would die the same year he did ("The Curse of Jacques"). The last song deals with the alleged help of former Templar Knights to the Scots during the Battle of Bannockburn, which allowed them to acquire independence from the English rule ("Battle of Bannockburn").

== Historical accuracy ==
The album mixes historical accurate content (the Templars' founding and their demise under false accusations at the hand of Philip IV of France, Richard Lionheart on crusade) with myths and legends (i.e. the Holy Grail, the curse of Jacques de Molay, the cult of Baphomet, the Templars' alleged role in the Battle of Bannockburn).

== Credits ==
- Chris Boltendahl - vocals
- Uwe Lulis - guitars
- Jens Becker - bass
- Stefan Arnold - drums
- Hans Peter "H.P." Katzenburg - keyboards

Additional Musicians

- Rolf Köhler - backing vocals
- Piet Sielck - backing vocals, spoken word
- Hacky Hackmann - backing vocals
- Scott Cochrane - bagpipes

Production

- Chris Boltendahl - producer
- Uwe Lulis - producer
- Suno Fabitch - mixing, engineering
- John Cremer - mastering
- Markus Mayer - cover art
- Jens Rosendahl - photography
