= War Games (Grave Digger album) =

Studio album by Grave Digger
- Released: 1 February 1986
- Recorded: November–December 1985
- Studio: Horus Sound Studios, Hanover, Germany
- Genre: Speed metal; heavy metal
- Label: Noise (Germany) Combat/Noise (US)
- Producer: Chris Boltendahl; Grave Digger; Jan Němec

Grave Digger chronology
Witch Hunter (1985)	War Games (1986)	Stronger than Ever (1986)

War Games is the third studio album by German heavy metal band Grave Digger, released on 1 February 1986 through Noise Records. The official lyrics of the album have only been released with the 1994 Japanese re-release.

== Track listing ==
All songs written by Chris Boltendahl, Peter Masson, C. F. Frank and Albert Eckhardt

Side A
No.	Title	Length
1.	"Keep On Rockin'"	3:05
2.	"Heaven Can Wait"	3:33
3.	"Fire in Your Eyes"	3:44
4.	"Let Your Heads Roll"	4:05
5.	"Love Is Breaking My Heart"	4:06

Side B
No.	Title	Length
6.	"Paradise"	4:14
7.	"(Enola Gay) Drop the Bomb"	3:27
8.	"Fallout"	4:55
9.	"Playin' Fools"	3:57
10.	"The End" (instrumental)	2:25
Total length:		37:29

== Lineup ==
- Chris Boltendahl –vocals
- Peter Masson – guitar
- C. F. Frank – bass
- Albert Eckhardt – drums

Additional musician

- Michael "Flexig" Flechsig – backing vocals

Production

- Chris Boltendahl – producer, cover concept
- Jan Němec – producer, engineering, mixing, mastering
- Karl-U. Walterbach – executive producer
