= Jens Becker =

German bassist (born 1965)

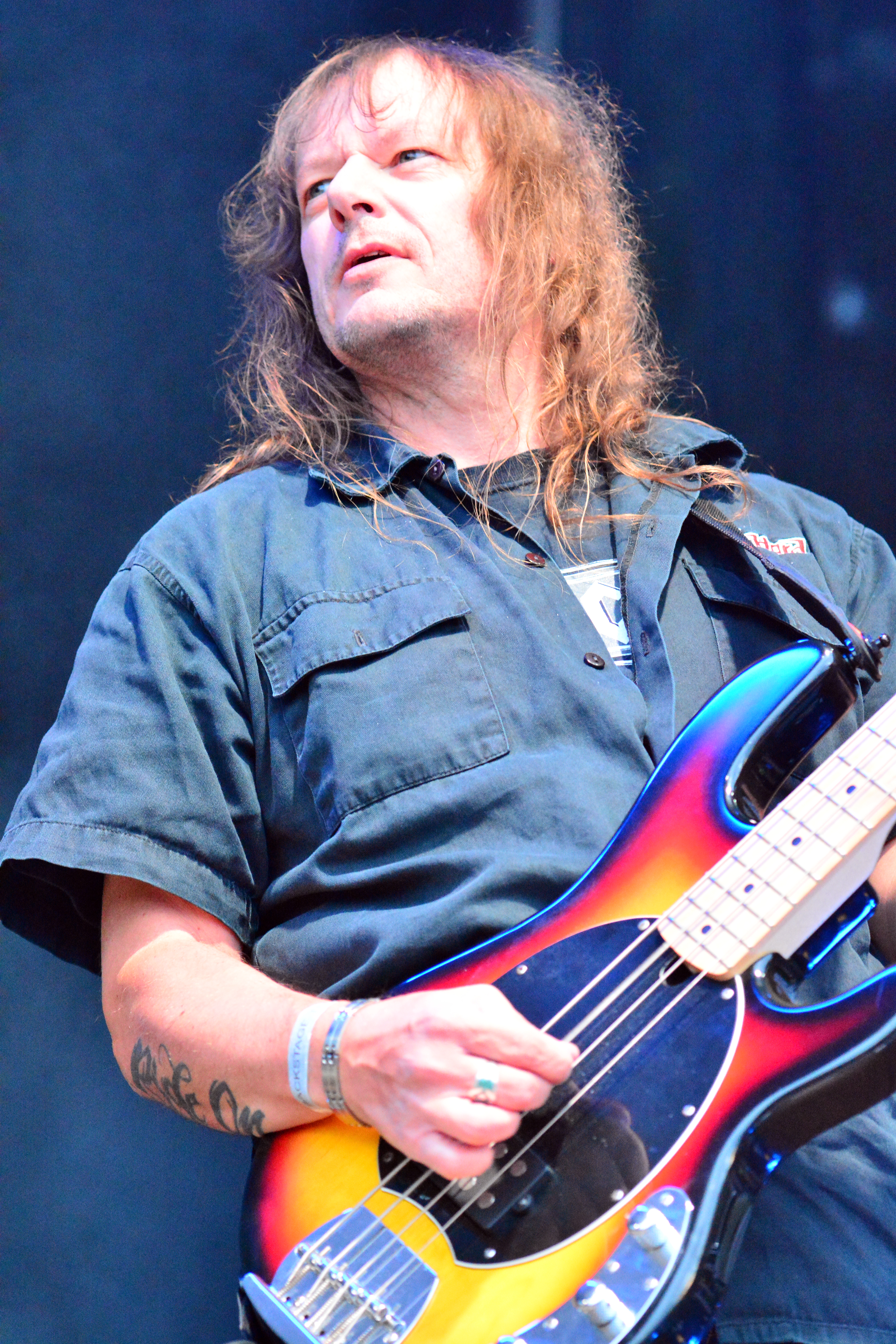
- Becker performing in 2014

Background information
- Born: 24 May 1965 (age 61); Fürth, West Germany
- Genres: Heavy metal, power metal
- Occupations: Bassist
- Years active: 1987–present

Jens Becker (born 24 May 1965) is a German heavy metal bass guitarist who currently performs with Grave Digger.

== History ==
Becker was born in Fürth. His first major band was Running Wild, which he joined in 1987. He stayed with them for four years and wrote/co-wrote a couple songs during his time in the band.

Just some time later he had quit Running Wild in 1991, a new speed/heavy metal band called X-Wild was formed by three ex-members of Running Wild (thus the name X (Ex) Wild), which Jens was the only bassist for under its existence. X-Wild disbanded in 1997.

In 1997, the power metal band Grave Digger lost their former bassist Tomi Göttlich and so Jens was asked to take his place. He accepted their offer and has since then remained a solid member of the band and co-writes many of their songs.

Some other bands that he has been involved in are Kingdom Come and also the melodic heavy metal project Zillion, releasing a self-titled album in 2004.

== Discography ==
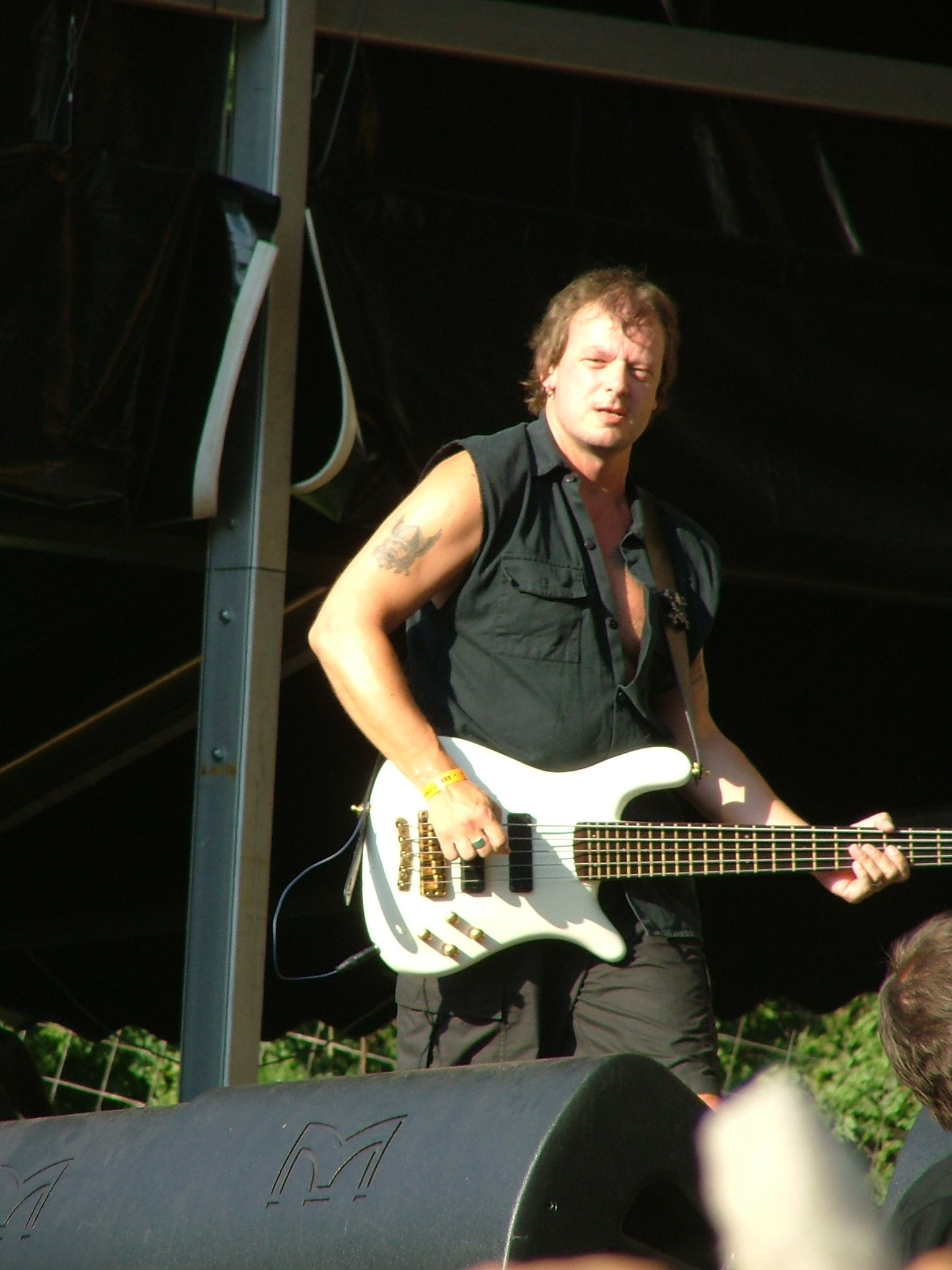
Becker in 2007

=== With Running Wild ===
- Port Royal (1988)
- Death or Glory (1989)
- Blazon Stone (1991)

EPs

- Bad To The Bone (1989)
- Wild Animal (1990)
- Little Big Horn (1991)

Live Albums

- Ready for Boarding (1988)

=== With X-Wild ===
- So What! (1994)
- Monster Effect (1994)
- Savageland (1996)

=== With Grave Digger ===
- Knights of the Cross (1998)
- Excalibur (1999)
- The Grave Digger (2001)
- Rheingold (2003)
- The Last Supper (2005)
- Liberty or Death (2007)
- Ballads of a Hangman (2009)
- The Clans Will Rise Again (2010)
- Clash of the Gods (2012)
- Return of the Reaper (2014)
- Healed by Metal (2017)
- The Living Dead (2018)
- Fields of Blood (2020)

EPs

- Yesterday (2006)
- Pray (2008)

Singles

- The Battle of Bannockburn (1998)
- The Round Table (Forever) (1999)
- Silent Revolution (2006)

Live Albums

- Tunes of Wacken (2002)
- 25 to Live (2005)

=== With Zillion ===
- Zillion (2004)
