= Tunes of War =

Studio album by Grave Digger
- Released: 25 August 1996
- Recorded: May 1996 at Principal Studios, Senden, Münster, Germany
- Genre: Heavy metal, power metal
- Label: GUN Records
- Producer: Chris Boltendahl & Uwe Lulis

Grave Digger chronology
Heart of Darkness (1995)	Tunes of War (1996)	Knights of the Cross (1998)

Tunes of War is the seventh studio album by German heavy metal band Grave Digger. It is a concept about the Scottish struggles for independence from England, from the medieval conflicts between its clans in the 11th century through to the Jacobite rebellion of the 18th. This is the first album to feature drummer Stefan Arnold, and the last album to feature bassist Tomi Göttlich.

It is the first album in Grave Digger's trilogy of medievally inspired concept albums which was continued by Knights of the Cross (1998) and concluding with Excalibur (1999).

== Track listing ==
All songs composed & arranged by Grave Digger.

No.	Title	Length
1.	"The Brave" (Intro)	2:24
2.	"Scotland United"	4:35
3.	"The Dark of the Sun"	4:32
4.	"William Wallace (Braveheart)"	5:01
5.	"The Bruce"	6:57
6.	"The Battle of Flodden"	4:04
7.	"The Ballad of Mary (Queen of Scots)"	5:00
8.	"The Truth"	3:50
9.	"Cry for Freedom (James the VI)"	3:16
10.	"Killing Time"	2:52
11.	"Rebellion (The Clans Are Marching)"	4:05
12.	"Culloden Muir"	4:05
13.	"The Fall of the Brave" (Outro)	1:58
Total length:		52:39

Digipak bonus tracks
No.	Title	Length
1.	"Heavy Metal Breakdown" (Re-recorded version)	4:31
2.	"Witchhunter" (Re-recorded version)	3:14
3.	"Headbanging Man" (Re-recorded version)	3:55
Total length:		1:04:19

== Credits ==
- Chris Boltendahl - vocals
- Uwe Lulis - guitars
- Tomi Göttlich - bass
- Stefan Arnold - drums

Additional Musicians

- Hansi Kürsch - backing vocals
- Scott Cochrane - bagpipes
- Hans Peter Katzenburg - keyboards

Production

- Chris Boltendahl - producer
- Uwe Lulis - producer
- Suno Fabitch - mixing, engineering
- John Cremer - mastering
- Andreas Schöwe - photography
- Andreas Marschall - cover art
- Ines Phillip - photography
