= Stronger Than Ever (album) =

Studio album by Digger
- Released: 1 December 1986
- Recorded: September–October 1986
- Studio: Ice Sound Studio, Hannover, Germany
- Genre: Heavy metal; glam metal
- Length: 39:09
- Label: Noise International
- Producer: Mick Jackson

Digger chronology
War Games (1986)	Stronger Than Ever (1986)	The Best of the Eighties (1993)

Stronger Than Ever is the fourth studio album by German heavy metal band Grave Digger. However, they changed their name to just "Digger" for this release. Retrospect Records, a little-known record label, very briefly issued a re-release of the album on CD in 2005. The CD was released with presumably no involvement from the band and is considered a bootleg. The CD is no longer available and the only official versions of the album that were released by the band are the vinyl and cassette versions. To this day it remains the only album in Grave Digger's catalog to not receive an official CD release. "Shadows of the Past" borrows two lyrical lines from "Yesterday", a song released on their 1984 album Heavy Metal Breakdown.

== Track listing ==
Side A
No.	Title	Length
1.	"Wanna Get Close"	4:35
2.	"Don't Leave Me Lonely"	4:21
3.	"Stronger Than Ever"	4:34
4.	"Moonriders"	3:46
5.	"Lay It On"	3:04

Side B
No.	Title	Length
6.	"I Don't Need Your Love"	4:21
7.	"Listen to the Music"	3:51
8.	"Stay till the Morning"	3:53
9.	"Stand Up and Rock"	3:59
10.	"Shadows of the Past"	2:45
Total length:		39:09

== Notes ==
- The 1987 cassette release contains an exclusive untitled intro before "Shadows of the Past", which is not listed
- The track listing is erroneously printed on the back cover as:

- Stand Up and Rock
- Wanna Get Close
- Lay It On
- Don't Leave Me Lonely
- Stronger than Ever
- I Don't Need Your Love
- Moonriders
- Stay till the Morning
- Listen to the Music
- Shadows of the Past

== Personnel ==
- Chris Boltendahl – vocals
- Uwe Lulis – guitars
- C. F. Brank – bass
- Albert Eckardt – drums

Additional musicians

- Bodo Schopf – drum programming
- Matthias "Matz" Ulmer – keyboards
- Armin Sabol – lead guitars on "Stand Up and Rock"

Production

- Karl-U. Walterbach – executive producer
- Mick Jackson – producer
- Steven Begg – cover art, photography
- Jan Němec – engineering, mixing, mastering
