= The Reaper (album) =

Studio album by Grave Digger
- Released: 2 November 1993
- Recorded: 6 August – 8 September 1993
- Studio: Karo Studios, Hamburg, Germany
- Genre: Speed metal; power metal
- Length: 47:29
- Label: GUN
- Producer: Chris Boltendahl; Uwe Lulis; Piet Sielck

Grave Digger chronology
| Stronger Than Ever (1986) | The Reaper (1993) | Heart of Darkness (1995) |

The Reaper is the fifth studio album by German heavy metal band Grave Digger. It was released on 2 November 1993 via the label GUN Records. This was the band's return after a long hiatus, released seven years after their previous album Stronger Than Ever.

== Background ==
A new line-up was formed except for the band leader, Chris Boltendahl and guitar player Uwe Lulis. The latter had convinced Boltendahl to release a new album in the first place, which was why he later on tried to get the name Grave Digger when he parted from the rest of the band (after the release of Excalibur). In this album there was a change towards darker lyrics and faster songs, as well as the start of the trend of featuring the Grim Reaper on the cover. The album cover image itself is a "Dance of Death" woodcut by 19th century German artist Alfred Rethel. Much of the material was written in the late 1980s, during Boltendahl's short-lived project, Hawaii.

== Track listing ==
All songs written and arranged by Grave Digger, except track 1 (Piet Sielck).

Side A
| No. | Title | Length |
|---|---|---|
| 1. | "Tribute to Death" (Intro) | 1:28 |
| 2. | "The Reaper" | 4:16 |
| 3. | "Ride On" | 3:32 |
| 4. | "Shadows of a Moonless Night" | 3:55 |
| 5. | "Play Your Game (And Kill)" | 3:25 |
| 6. | "Wedding Day" | 3:53 |
| 7. | "Spy of Mas'On" | 3:59 |

Side B
| No. | Title | Length |
|---|---|---|
| 8. | "Under My Flag" | 4:46 |
| 9. | "Fight the Fight" | 2:46 |
| 10. | "Legion of the Lost (Part II)" | 6:18 |
| 11. | "And the Devil Plays Piano" | 4:01 |
| 12. | "Ruler Mr. H" | 3:38 |
| 13. | "The Madness Continues" (Instrumental) | 1:32 |
| Total length: | | 47:29 |

== Personnel ==
- Chris Boltendahl – vocals
- Uwe Lulis – guitars
- Tomi Göttlich – bass
- Jörg Michael – drums

Additional musicians

- Piet Sielck – lead guitars on "And the Devil Plays Piano"; effects, keyboards on "Tribute to Death" and "The Madness Continues"
- Rolf Köhler – backing vocals
- Billy King – backing vocals

Production

- René Bonsink – photography
- Petrus Lohdograficus – layout
- Chris Boltendahl – producer, cover concept
- Tomi Göttlich – cover concept
- Peter Dell – cover layout
- Piet Sielck – producer, engineering, mixing, mastering
- Wolfgang Funk - executive producer
- Uwe Lulis – producer
- Mark Marthen – cover concept
