= Uwe Lulis =

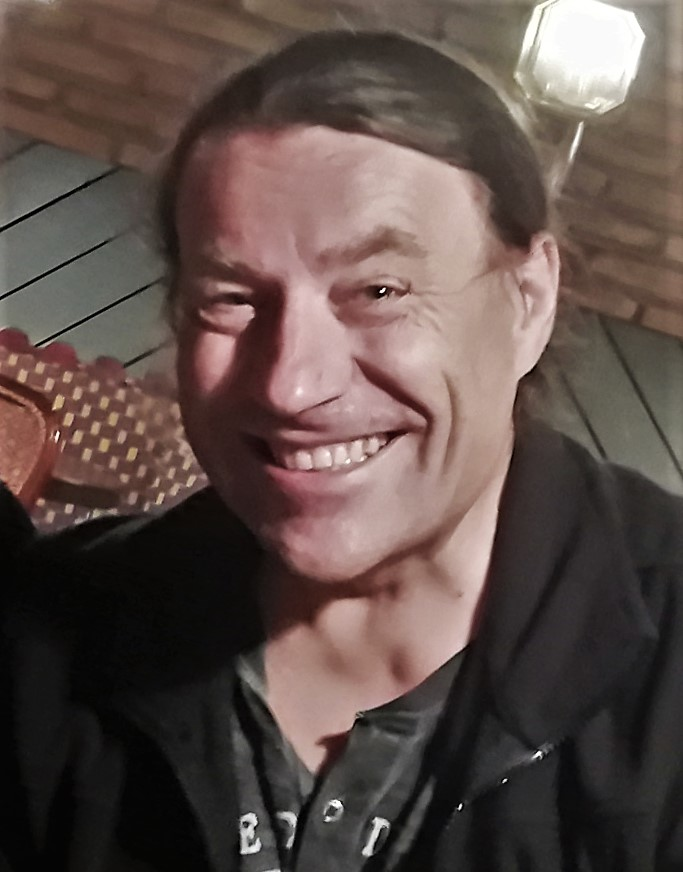
- Uwe Lulis in 2019

Background information
- Born: 6 December 1965 (age 59); Osnabrück, West Germany
- Genres: Heavy metal, power metal, speed metal
- Occupation: Musician
- Instrument: Guitar
- Years active: 1986–present

Uwe Lulis (born 6 December 1965) is a German guitarist. He is known for being the playing guitar in Grave Digger for about 13 years, for whom he co-wrote many songs during his time in the band. After leaving Grave Digger Lulis and Tomi Göttlich, former bassist of Grave Digger, formed the heavy metal band Rebellion in 2000. Lulis and two other members left Rebellion in 2010.

Lulis is a known producer and owns his studio Black Solaris Studios. He has produced other bands like Wizard, Paragon, Montany etc.

In October 2008, Lulis broke his right leg in a motorcycle crash. Because of this, his band Rebellion used only one guitarist on their planned gigs.

On 4 December 2014, Lulis joined Accept as a replacement for guitarist Herman Frank. During his 11-year tenure in Accept, he recorded four studio albums and one live album before parting ways with the band on 25 September 2025.

On July 31st 2025, Lulis joined Grave Digger on stage at the Wacken Open Air festival to celebrate the bands 45th anniversary, marking the first time he has played with the band in 25 years.

== Discography ==
=== With Digger (1987) ===
- Stronger Than Ever (1987)

=== With Grave Digger (1987–2000) ===
- The Reaper (1993)
- Symphony of Death (1993)
- Heart of Darkness (1995)
- Tunes of War (1996)
- The Dark of the Sun (EP) (1997)
- Knights of the Cross (1998)
- Excalibur (1999)

=== With Rebellion (2000–2010) ===
- Shakespeare's Macbeth – A Tragedy in Steel (2002)
- Born a Rebel (2003)
- Sagas of Iceland – The History of the Vikings Volume 1 (2005)
- Miklagard (single) (2006)
- Miklagard – The History of the Vikings Volume 2 (2007)
- Arise: From Ginnungagap to Ragnarök – The History of the Vikings Volume 3 (2009)

=== With Accept (2014–2025) ===
- Symphonic Terror – Live at Wacken 2017 (2017)
- Restless and Live (2017)
- The Rise of Chaos (2017)
- Too Mean to Die (2021)
- Humanoid (2024)
