= Rheingold (Grave Digger album) =

Studio album by Grave Digger
- Released: 3 June 2003
- Recorded: October 2002 – January 2003 at Principal Studios, Germany
- Genre: Heavy metal, power metal
- Length: 44:18
- Label: Nuclear Blast
- Producer: Chris Boltendahl & "Resetti Brothers"

Grave Digger chronology
Tunes of Wacken – Live (2001)	Rheingold (2003)	The Last Supper (2005)

Professional ratings
Review scores
Source	Rating
AllMusic	3/5 stars

Rheingold is the 11th studio album by German heavy metal band Grave Digger. It is a concept album based on Richard Wagner's The Ring of the Nibelung. The album was released in 2003. Many lines of the lyrics are quoted or paraphrased from (an English translation of) Wagner. The music also has occasional references to Wagner, the most obvious one perhaps being the intro to the song "Dragon", which is the "Siegfried's Horn Call" leitmotif.

== Track listing ==
All songs are composed and arranged by Boltendahl/Becker/Katzenburg/Schmidt; all lyrics by Boltendahl.

No.	Title	Length
1.	"The Ring"	1:48
2.	"Rheingold"	4:02
3.	"Valhalla"	3:48
4.	"Giants"	4:37
5.	"Maidens of War"	5:48
6.	"Sword"	5:03
7.	"Dragon"	4:07
8.	"Liar"	2:46
9.	"Murderer"	5:37
10.	"Twilight of the Gods"	6:42

Limited edition bonus tracks
No.	Title	Length
11.	"Hero"	6:34
12.	"Goodbye"	4:18

== Album line-up ==
- Chris Boltendahl - vocals
- Manni Schmidt - guitars
- Jens Becker - bass
- Stefan Arnold - drums
- H.P. Katzenburg - keyboards
