= Heavy Metal Breakdown =

Studio album by Grave Digger
- Released: April 1984 (Europe); October 1984 (US)
- Recorded: January 1984
- Studio: Musiclab Studio, West Berlin, Germany
- Genre: Heavy metal; speed metal
- Length: 36:38 (Europe); 42:13 (US)
- Label: Noise (Europe); Megaforce (US)
- Producer: Karl-Ulrich Walterbach; Grave Digger

Grave Digger chronology
Heavy Metal Breakdown (1984)	Witch Hunter (1985)

Professional ratings
Review scores
Source	Rating
AllMusic	4/5 stars

Heavy Metal Breakdown is the debut studio album by German heavy metal band Grave Digger, released on 20 October 1984 via Noise Records. The music in this album is strongly influenced by German heavy metal band Accept and its then-vocalist Udo Dirkschneider.

Although singer Chris Boltendahl was credited for all the music and lyrics, it was only a technical issue. "At the time we didn't have the money to enroll all four members to GEMA. So we only enrolled Chris", said Gerd Hanke then-manager of Grave Digger in book The Story of Noise Records. "Lyrics had always been a problem for Chris" - added guitarist Peter Masson. "His school English was quite bad. During my time with Grave Digger, Gerd wrote most of the lyrics."

== Track listing ==
Music composed and arranged by Grave Digger and lyrics by Chris Boltendahl, except where indicated.

1984 German version

Side A
No.	Title	Writer(s)	Length
1.	"Headbanging Man"		3:37
2.	"Heavy Metal Breakdown"		3:42
3.	"Back from the War"		5:35
4.	"Yesterday"	Beate Marquardt	5:06

Side B
No.	Title	Writer(s)	Length
5.	"We Wanna Rock You"		4:17
6.	"Legion of the Lost"		4:54
7.	"Tyrant"		3:17
8.	"2000 Light Years from Home" (The Rolling Stones cover)	Mick Jagger, Keith Richards	2:54
9.	"Heart Attack"		3:16
Total length:			36:38

1994 Japanese edition bonus tracks
No.	Title	Length
1.	"Violence"	4:43
2.	"Shoot Her Down"	3:39
3.	"We Wanna Rock You" (Single Version)	3:36
4.	"Storming the Brain"	5:05
5.	"Shine On"	5:14
6.	"Tears of Blood"	2:37
7.	"Don't Kill the Children"	3:16
8.	"Girls of Rock 'n' Roll"	3:41
9.	"Stronger Than Ever"	4:31
10.	"I Don't Need Your Love"	4:21
Total length:		77:21

1984 US version

Side A
No.	Title	Length
1.	"Headbanging Man"	3:28
2.	"We Wanna Rock You" (Single Version)	3:37
3.	"Back from the War"	5:27
4.	"Storming the Brain"	5:05
5.	"Heavy Metal Breakdown"	3:37

Side B
No.	Title	Writer(s)	Length
6.	"Tyrant"		3:13
7.	"Shoot Her Down"		3:39
8.	"Legion Of the Lost"		4:50
9.	"Heart Attack"		3:30
10.	"Yesterday"	Beate Marquardt	5:02

== Notes ==
The 1994 bonus tracks are from the following:

- "Violence" is taken from the 1983 split album Rock from Hell - German Metal Attack
- "Shoot Her Down", "We Wanna Rock You" and "Storming the Brain" are taken from the 1984 EP Shoot Her Down
- "Shine On" and "Tears of Blood" are taken from the 1985 split album Metal Attack Vol. 1
- "Don't Kill the Children" and "Girls of Rock 'n' Roll" are taken from the 1994 compilation album The Best of the Eighties
- "Stronger Than Ever" and "I Don't Need Your Love" are taken from the 1986 album Stronger Than Ever, in which case they were called Digger at the time

== Personnel ==
Band members

- Chris Boltendahl – vocals
- Peter Masson – guitars
- Willi Lackman – bass
- Albert Eckardt – drums

Additional musicians

- Dietmar Dillhardt – keyboards on "Yesterday"

Production

- Karl-Ulrich Walterbach – producer
- Harris Johns – engineer, mixing
- Grave Digger – arrangements
- Bernd Gansohr – cover painting
