= Witch Hunter (album) =

Studio album by Grave Digger
- Released: 10 May 1985
- Recorded: January–February 1985 at Musiclab Studios, Berlin, Germany
- Genres: Speed metal; heavy metal
- Labels: Noise (Germany); Megaforce (US)
- Producers: Chris Boltendahl; Grave Digger; Harris Johns

Grave Digger chronology
Heavy Metal Breakdown (1984)	Witch Hunter (1985)	War Games (1986)

Professional ratings
Review scores
Source	Rating
AllMusic	4/5 stars

Witch Hunter is the second studio album by German heavy metal band Grave Digger. It was released on 10 May 1985 via Noise Records.

The song "School's Out" is an Alice Cooper cover that was originally released on the School's Out album.

== Track listing ==
All songs composed and arranged by Grave Digger, except where indicated. Lyrics written by Grave Digger except where noted

Side A
No.	Title	Lyrics	Length
1.	"Witch Hunter"	Grave Digger, Roy Dean Brown	4:24
2.	"Night Drifter"	Grave Digger, Roy Dean Brown	3:10
3.	"Get Ready for Power"		5:05
4.	"Love Is a Game"	Grave Digger, Roy Dean Brown	5:43

Side B
No.	Title	Lyrics	Length
5.	"Get Away"	Grave Digger, Roy Dean Brown	2:59
6.	"Fight for Freedom"	Grave Digger, Roy Dean Brown	3:54
7.	"School's Out" (Alice Cooper cover)	Alice Cooper, Michael Bruce	2:41
8.	"Friends of Mine"		5:23
9.	"Here I Stand"		4:49
Total length:			38:08

== Notes ==
- The 1985 releases from Banzai Records and Megaforce Records and the 1987 Brown Back Cover Press release from Brazilian-based record label Woodstock Discos, contain the four tracks "Don't Kill the Children", "Shine On", "Shoot Her Down" and "Storming the Brain", excludes "Love Is a Game"
- "Don't Kill the Children" features an extended, choral intro not present on the version featured on the 1994 Japanese re-issue of Heavy Metal Breakdown. This is considered the original version of the song
- The 1994 Japanese re-issue contains the 1986 album War Games

== Line up ==
- Chris Boltendahl – bass, vocals
- Peter Masson – guitar, bass
- Albert Eckardt – drums
- René "T. Bone" Teichgräber – bass on "Love Is a Game" and "School's Out"

Production

- Karl-U. Walterbach – executive producer
- Jochen Ruschinzik – photography
- Hans B. Bruns – design (inner sleeve)
- Chris Boltendahl – producer
- Harris Johns – co-producer, engineering, mixing
