= The Last Supper (Grave Digger album) =

Studio album by Grave Digger
- Released: 17 January 2005
- Recorded: July–October-2004 at Principal Studios, Germany
- Genre: Heavy metal, power metal
- Label: Nuclear Blast
- Producer: Chris Boltendahl, Manni Schmidt & Jörg Umbreit

Grave Digger chronology
Rheingold (2003)	The Last Supper (2005)	Liberty or Death (2007)

Professional ratings
Review scores
Source	Rating
AllMusic	3/5 stars

The Last Supper is the 12th studio album by German heavy metal band Grave Digger.

== Track listing ==
All songs composed and arranged by Boltendahl/Becker/Schmidt and Katzenburg; all lyrics by Boltendahl.

No.	Title	Length
1.	"Passion"	1:20
2.	"The Last Supper"	5:28
3.	"Desert Rose"	4:20
4.	"Grave in the No Man's Land"	4:10
5.	"Hell to Pay"	3:48
6.	"Soul Savior"	4:10
7.	"Crucified"	7:00
8.	"Divided Cross"	3:54
9.	"The Night Before"	3:30
10.	"Black Widows"	4:22
11.	"Hundred Days"	4:17
12.	"Always and Eternally"	5:30

Limited edition bonus tracks
No.	Title	Length
13.	"Sleepless"	3:31
14.	"Jeepers Creepers"	3:54

== Artwork ==
After the cover art was revealed in November 2004, which received positive feedback, a number of fans were disappointed by it because of the motive. The band stated that the cover isn't a message of the Devil and not against Christians, but a representation of a depressive Jesus Christ at his last days before his death.

== Inspiration ==
Despite claims to the contrary, the album is not a concept album, although several songs are based on the last days of Jesus Christ:

- "The Last Supper", about the last supper of Jesus Christ and the treachery of Judas
- "Soul Savior", about Christianity
- "Crucified", about the feeling of Jesus when he was crucified
- "Divided Cross", about the time when Jesus was crucified and the feelings of the people
- "Always and Eternally", about the memories and belief that remains after Christ died

== Personnel ==
- Chris Boltendahl - vocals
- Manni Schmidt - guitars
- Jens Becker - bass
- Stefan Arnold - drums
- H.P. Katzenburg - keyboards
