= Senden =

- Town
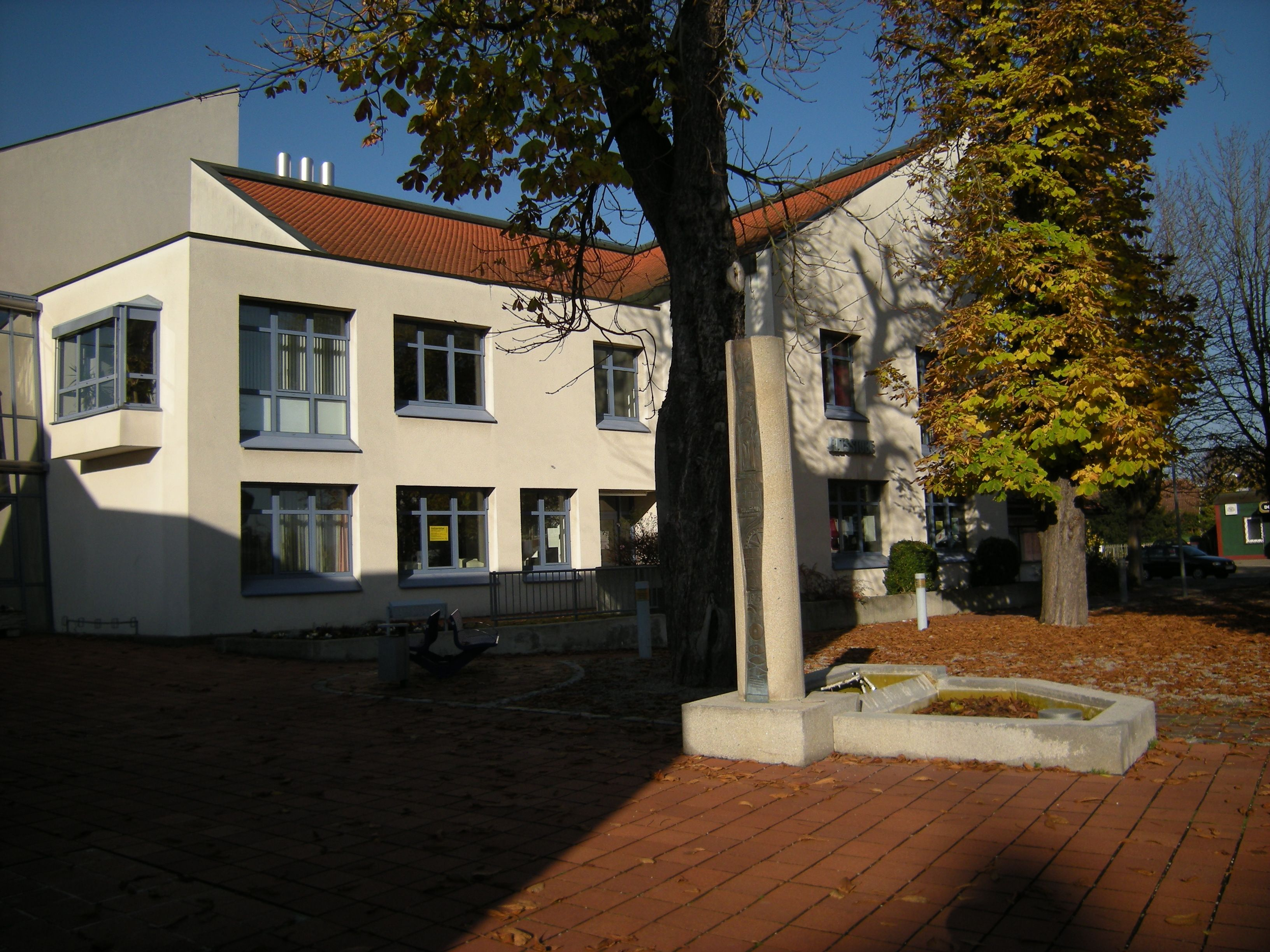
- Town hall

- Coat of arms

- Location of Senden within Neu-Ulm district
- Interactive map of Senden
- Location within Germany Location within Bavaria
- Coordinates: 48°19′N 10°04′E
- Country: Germany
- State: Bavaria
- Admin. region: Schwaben
- District: Neu-Ulm

Government
  - Mayor (2020–26): Claudia Schäfer-Rudolf (CSU)

Area
  - Total: 25.21 km^{2} (9.73 sq mi)
- Elevation: 486 m (1,594 ft)

Population (2025-12-31)
  - Total: 23,676
  - Density: 939.2/km^{2} (2,432/sq mi)
- Time zone: UTC+01:00 (CET)
  - Summer (DST): UTC+02:00 (CEST)
- Postal codes: 89250
- Dialling codes: 07307, 07309 (Witzighausen)
- Vehicle registration: NU
- Website: www.stadt-senden.de

The town of Senden (German pronunciation: [ˈzɛndn̩]) is the second-largest town of the district of Neu-Ulm in Bavaria and is located at the border to Baden-Württemberg. The town belongs to the Donau-Iller-Nahverkehrsverbund. Senden's neighbours are Neu-Ulm in the north, Weißenhorn in the east, Vöhringen in the south and Illerkirchberg in the west.

== Town parts ==
The town parts are Aufheim, Ay, Freudenegg, Hittistetten, Witzighausen and Wullenstetten.

== Politics ==
The Senden town council consists since the election of 2014 of:

- CSU: 11 seats
- SPD: 5 seats
- FWG: 6 seats
- Greens: 4 seats
- BISS: 4 seats

== Economics and infrastructure ==
=== Traffic ===
Senden lies at the Bundesstraße 28 and at the train line Ulm-Oberstdorf (Illertalbahn).

=== Companies ===
- Möbel Inhofer

== Education ==
=== Schools ===
==== Elementary- and Main schools ====
- Elementary school Senden (Bürgermeister-Engelhart-Schule)
- Elementary school Aufheim
- Elementary school Ay
- Elementary school Wullenstetten
- Main school Senden (Rektor-Werner-Ziegler-Schule)

==== Vocational- and technical highschools ====
- Urban economics school Senden

==== Special schools ====
- Lindenhof-school Senden, private promotion center for mental development

=== Spare time- and sports centres ===
- Ice skating rink
- public lake- and indoor swimming pool
- several bathing lakes
- City park with Minigolf

== International relations ==
Senden is twinned with:

- Piove di Sacco (Italy).
- Uffholtz (France, Alsace)
- Senden in North Rhine Westphalia.

== Culture ==
Urban cultural events take mainly place in the 2002 opened "Bürgerhaus".

=== Music associations ===
- "Dorfmusikanten Aufheim" (village musicians of Aufheim) with their youth band "WITA"
- "Musikvereinigung Senden-Ay-Oberkirchberg" (united musicians of Senden-Ay-Oberkirchberg) www.musikvereinigung.net
- "Harmonia Wullenstetten" (harmony of Wullenstetten)

=== Singing associations ===
- Choir unity "Concordia" Ay
- Choir unity "Frohsinn" Aufheim
- Choir unity "Sängertreu" Senden
- Choir unity Witzighausen-Hittistetten
- Church choir Senden (Protestant)
- Church choir Senden (Catholic)
