= Pandemonium =

Pandæmonium, Pandemonium or Pandamonium may refer to:

== Literature and art ==
- Pandæmonium (Paradise Lost), capital of Hell in John Milton's epic poem Paradise Lost
- Pandemonium (painting), an 1841 painting by John Martin inspired by Milton's poem
- Pandaemonium (Jennings book), a book by Humphrey Jennings, published posthumously in 1985
- Pandaemonium (novel), a 2009 novel by Christopher Brookmyre
- Pandemonium (novel), a 2012 novel by Lauren Oliver

== Film and television ==
=== Film ===
- Pandemonium (1971 film), or Demons, a Japanese film directed by Toshio Matsumoto
- Pandemonium (1982 film), an American parody slasher film
- Pandemonium (1987 film), an Australian fantasy comedy horror film
- Pandaemonium (film), a 2000 UK drama about the poets Coleridge and Wordsworth
- Pandemonium (2023 film), a French horror film

=== Television ===
- Pandamonium (TV series), a 1982 American animated series
- Pandemonium, the opening segment of the London 2012 opening ceremony

==== Episodes ====
- "Pandemonium" (The Good Place), 2019
- "Pandemonium" (Here We Go), 2020
- "Pandemonium" (Kaze no Stigma), 2007
- "Pandemonium" (The Unit), 2007

== Gaming and amusements ==
- Pandemonium (role-playing game), a 1993 comedy role-playing game designed by Stephan Michael Sechi
- Pandemonium! (video game), a 1996 platform game
  - Pandemonium 2, a 1997 platform game and sequel to Pandemonium!
- Pandemonium (Dungeons & Dragons), a fictional location in the fantasy role-playing game Dungeons & Dragons
- Pandemonium (roller coaster), a roller coaster at several Six Flags parks
- Pandamonium, former name of Serpent Slayer, Chinese-themed ride at Dreamworld in Australia

== Music ==
- Pandemonium (band), a 1980s American hard rock/heavy metal band
- Pandemonium: the Lost and Found Orchestra, a music-based theatre piece by Luke Cresswell and Steve McNicholas
- Pandemonium Tour, a 2009–2010 concert tour by Pet Shop Boys
- Pandemonium (Joji), a 2023 concert tour by Joji
- Pandemonium, a Trinidadian steel band with Ray Holman

=== Albums ===
- Pandemonium (Cavalera Conspiracy album), 2014
- Pandemonium (Chthonic album), 2008
- Pandemonium (Gothminister album) or the title song, 2022
- Pandemonium (Killing Joke album) or the title song (see below), 1994
- Pandemonium (Loudness album) or the title song, 2001
- Pandemonium (Pet Shop Boys album) or the title song, 2010
- Pandemonium (Pretty Maids album) or the title song, 2010
- Pandemonium (The Time album) or the title song, 1990
- Pandemonium (Torture Squad album) or the title song, 2003
- Pandemonium! (album), by B2K, 2002
- Pandemonium – The Singles Collection, by BWO, 2008
- Pandemonium (EP), by In Legend, or the title song, 2010
- Pandemonium, by Bellowhead, 2015
- Pandæmonium, by Hakos Baelz, 2023
- Pandemonium, by Nigel Eaton, 2002
- Pandemonium, by Sic, 2007

=== Songs ===
- "Pandemonium" (song), by Killing Joke, 1994
- "Pandemonium", by NF from Hope, 2023
- "Pandemonium", by P1Harmony, 2026
- "Pandemonium", by Pel Mel, 1983
- "Pandemonium", from the musical The 25th Annual Putnam County Spelling Bee, 2005

== Technology and science ==
- Pandemonium architecture, an early connectionist AI technique proposed in 1959
- Pandemonium effect, a problem that may appear when high resolution detectors are used in beta decay studies
- Pandemonium Dorsa, a mountain range on the dwarf planet Pluto

== Military ==
- USS Pandemonium, a United States Navy training vessel

== See also ==
- Pandemonia
