= Stones at Goliath =

Studio album by In Legend
- Released: 2015
- Genre: Piano rock
- Label: Eat the Beat Music

In Legend chronology
Ballads 'n' Bullets (2011)	Stones at Goliath (2015)	Goliath's End (2015)

Stones at Goliath is the second studio album by In Legend, a band from vocalist and pianist Bastian Emig, mostly known as the drummer from the German a cappella metal band Van Canto.

== Track listing ==
No.	Title	Length
1.	"Envoys of Peace"	5:40
2.	"Threatened"	3:47
3.	"Lonely"	3:44
4.	"King of Apathy"	4:16
5.	"Empire of Concrete"	4:52
6.	"Monuments for Eternity"	4:13
7.	"To New Horizons"	4:05
8.	"The Voodoo Girl"	4:11
9.	"Choices in Coma" (featuring Laura Vargas Contador)	5:47
10.	"Empty Place"	4:17
11.	"Alienation"	4:08
12.	"A 1000 Paper Cranes"	4:54
13.	"On the Morrow"	4:31
14.	"Another Me"	3:44

== Personnel ==
=== In Legend ===
- Bastian Emig – choir conductor, composer, engineering, drums, mixing, piano, producer, sound design, synthesizer
- Daniel Galmarini – piano
- Daniel Schmidle – keytar, piano, composer, engineer, mixing, sound design, engineer, design
- Paul Perlejewski – bass guitar
- Daniel Wicke – bass guitar
- Marcos Feminella – drums
- Dennis Otto – drums, choir

=== Guest musicians ===
- Helga Bieser – choir
- Melanie Bohlend – choir
- Martina Böhmer – choir
- Benni Cellini (Letzte Instanz) – cello
- Laura Vargas Contador (ex-Sacramento, Inferno Doll) – female vocals on "Choices in Coma"
- Alexandra Frerichs – choir
- Vanessa Gerlich – choir
- Eva Glaser – choir
- Glonner Chorbuben – children's choir (conducted by Martin Danes)
- Teresa Heiser – choir
- Sharon Horen – choir
- Fiona Horn – choir
- Angela Igl – choir
- Eva Kühn – choir
- Henriette Mittag – viola
- Michael Müller – choir
- Martin Panse – choir
- Vanessa Schambil – choir
- Wendy Schulz – choir
- Sabrina Schwabtz – choir
- Sarah Schwarz – choir
- Melanie Uhl – choir
- Niels Löffler (Orden Ogan) – choir
- Sebastian "Seeb" Levermann (Orden Ogan) – engineer, choir

=== Crew ===
- Martin Danes – choir conductor
- Juan Pablo Donoso – engineer
- Andrea Friedrich – photography
- Glönn () – artwork
- Jamie Kam () – artwork
- Bastian Ködel – engineer
- Jürgen Lusky – engineer, mastering, mixing, sound design
- Jan Sauerssig – engineer
- Jonas Schria – engineer
