= Goliath's End =

EP by In Legend
- Released: 2015
- Genre: Piano rock

In Legend chronology
| Stones at Goliath (2015) | Goliath's End (2015) |

Goliath's End is the second EP by In Legend, a band from vocalist and pianist Bastian Emig, mostly known as the drummer from the German a cappella metal band Van Canto.

It can be downloaded for free from the band's website.

== Track listing ==
| No. | Title | Length |
|---|---|---|
| 1. | "Waifs 'n Strays" | 4:18 |
| 2. | "Reason" | 3:46 |
| 3. | "Arabesque" | 4:26 |
| 4. | "Maybe" | 3:44 |
| 5. | "Wide Awake" | 3:26 |
| 6. | "No More Weddings" | 3:25 |

== Personnel ==
In Legend

- Bastian Emig – choir conductor, composer, engineering, drums, mixing, piano, producer, sound design, synthesizer
- Daniel Galmarini – piano
- Daniel Schmidle – keytar, piano, composer, engineer, mixing, sound design, engineer, design
- Paul Perlejewski – bass guitar
- Daniel Wicke – bass guitar
- Marcos Feminella – drums
- Dennis Otto – drums, choir

Guest musicians

- Helga Bieser – choir
- Melanie Bohlend – choir
- Martina Böhmer – choir
- Benni Cellini (Letzte Instanz) – cello
- Laura Vargas Contador (ex-Sacramento, Inferno Doll) – choir
- Alexandra Frerichs – choir
- Vanessa Gerlich – choir
- Eva Glaser – choir
- Glonner Chorbuben – children’s choir (conducted by Martin Danes)
- Teresa Heiser – choir
- Sharon Horen – choir
- Fiona Horn – choir
- Angela Igl – choir
- Eva Kühn – choir
- Henriette Mittag – viola
- Michael Müller – choir
- Martin Panse – choir
- Vanessa Schambil – choir
- Wendy Schulz – choir
- Sabrina Schwabtz – choir
- Sarah Schwarz – choir
- Melanie Uhl – choir
- Niels Löffler (Orden Ogan) – choir
- Sebastian “Seeb” Levermann (Orden Ogan) – engineer, choir

Crew

- Martin Danes – choir conductor
- Juan Pablo Donoso – engineer
- Andrea Friedrich – photography
- Glönn () – artwork
- Jamie Kam () – artwork
- Bastian Ködel – engineer
- Jürgen Lusky – engineer, mastering, mixing, sound design
- Jan Sauerssig – engineer
- Jonas Schria – engineer
