= Trust in Rust =

Studio album by Van Canto
- Released: 10 August 2018
- Genre: A cappella; heavy metal; power metal
- Length: 51:21
- Label: Napalm

Van Canto chronology
Voices of Fire (2016)	Trust in Rust (2018)	To the Power of Eight (2021)

Trust in Rust is the seventh studio album by German a cappella metal band Van Canto, released on 10 August 2018 via Napalm Records. It is their first album with lead vocalist Hagen Hirschmann and the first with returning bass vocalist Ingo "Ike" Sterzinger.

Among its tracks, it features two covers, one of "Hells Bells" (by AC/DC) and another of "Ride the Sky" (by Helloween), the latter featuring the band's guitarist and vocalist Kai Hansen. The digipack edition comes with a bonus disc featuring orchestral versions of 11 songs from the band's catalogue.

== Background ==
According to leader and vocal guitarist Stefan Schmidt, after finishing their tour in promotion of Voices of Fire in 2016, the band reflected on their goals and situations. They contemplated not continuing with the group, but came to the conclusion that music was still "far too important" in their lives. However, in August 2017, the group announced the departure of lead vocalist and founding member Dennis "Sly" Schunke.

Instead of auditioning for an unknown new member to replace Schunke, Schmidt preferred to reach out to an old fellow musician, Hagen Hirschmann, whom he knew since before van Canto.

The album also saw the return of their bass vocalist and founding member Ingo "Ike" Sterzinger, who briefly left the group during the previous album cycle but still recorded about 80% of the bass vocals for the effort.

== Production ==
Production on the album began around July 2017, when Hirschmann was already the band's choice for new vocalist.

When asked if having two bass vocalists created new arrangement possibilities, Schmidt said that the arrangements focused more on having an additional male voice than on having two bass voices, which allowed them to arrange "more densely".

== Reception ==
Professional ratings
Review scores
Source	Rating
Metal.de	7/10 stars
Laut.de	2/5 stars

Writing for Metal.de, Mirko Pidde saw a drastic change from former vocalist Dennis "Sly" Schunke to his replacement Hagen Hirschmann and felt that his voice "doesn't fit harmoniously into the band's sound", albeit praising the band for experimenting with growls for the first time. He criticized the cover of "Ride the Sky" for lacking the "rawness" of Walls of Jericho-era Helloween, but said the band did "everything right" with "Hells Bells", seeing it as Hirschmann's top performance on the entire album. He concluded by calling it "a well-produced album with a lot of strong numbers [...] even if you can't wait for another great feat like 'Tribe of Force' from 2010."

At Laut.de, Yan Vogel expressed his belief that the band is going on a downward trend since their three previous albums and that the addition of a seventh member did little to work on their weak points. On the other hand, he praised the work of lead vocalists Hirschmann and Inga Scharf, as well as the two cover versions. He concluded by praising the album's songwriting, but stating that it lacks a metal "soul".

== Track listing ==
Trust in Rust track listing
No.	Title	Length
1.	"Back in the Lead"	3:52
2.	"Javelin"	4:14
3.	"Trust in Rust"	3:38
4.	"Ride the Sky" (Helloween cover; feat. Kai Hansen)	4:53
5.	"Melody"	4:53
6.	"Neverland"	5:01
7.	"Desert Snake"	4:10
8.	"Darkest Days"	4:17
9.	"Infinity"	4:51
10.	"Hells Bells" (AC/DC cover)	5:05
11.	"Heading Home"	6:27
Total length:		51:21

Digipack bonus disc with orchestral versions
No.	Title	Length
1.	"The Mission"	4:27
2.	"Rain"	4:03
3.	"Hero"	5:21
4.	"Take to the Sky"	4:27
5.	"Water Fire Heaven Earth"	3:36
6.	"My Voice"	5:31
7.	"If I Die in Battle"	4:47
8.	"The Higher Flight"	5:05
9.	"Unholy"	3:40
10.	"The Other Ones"	4:22
Total length:		45:19

== Charts ==
Chart performance for Trust in Rust
Chart (2018)	Peak position
German Albums (Offizielle Top 100)	50

== Personnel ==
Van Canto

- Hagen Hirschmann – male vocals
- Inga Scharf – female vocals
- Ross Thompson – higher guitar vocals, backing vocals
- Stefan Schmidt – lower guitar vocals, solo guitar vocals, vocals with distortion effect, backing vocals
- Jan Moritz – bass vocals, backing vocals
- Ingo Sterzinger – bass vocals, backing vocals
- Bastian Emig – drums
