= In Legend =

German piano rock band

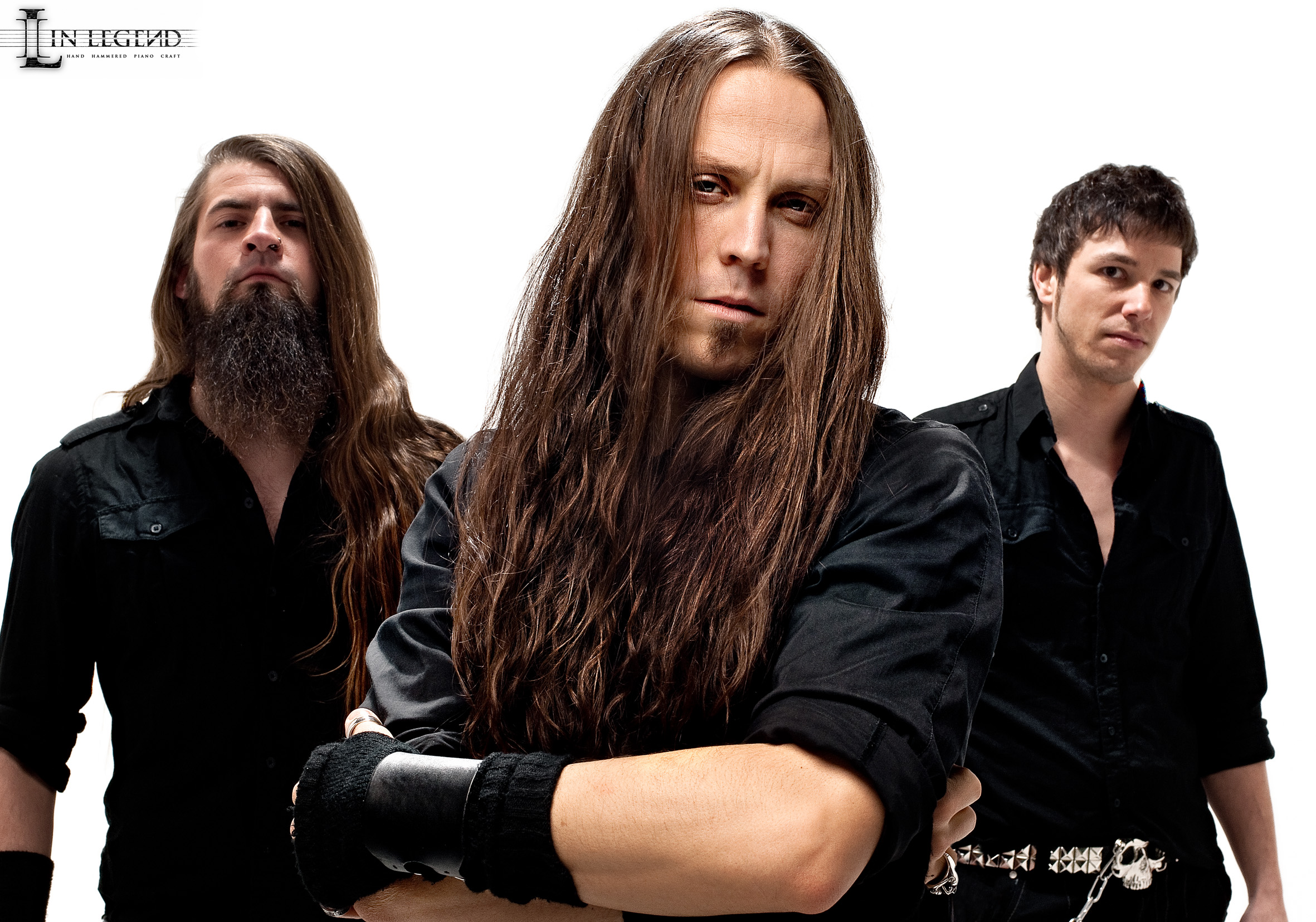
- 2012 promotional photo

Background information
- Origin: Berlin, Germany
- Genre: Piano rock
- Years active: 2010–present
- Label: SPV
- Members: Bastian Emig; Daniel Galmarini; Daniel Schmidle; Paul Perlejewski; Marcos Feminella
- Past members: Daniel Wicke; Dennis Otto
- Website: inlegend.de

In Legend (also Inlegend) is a German piano rock band, founded in 2010 by Van Canto drummer Bastian Emig who assumed the role of vocalist and pianist in the band. He was joined by Daniel Wicke on bass and Dennis Otto on drums; Wicke and Otto left the band in spring 2014. As of June 2014, the line-up includes Emig, Daniel Galmarini (piano), Daniel Schmidle (keytar, piano), Paul Perlejewski (bass), and Marcos Feminella (drums).

== History ==
=== Foundation and first EP ===
Bastian Emig stated that he had already been composing material for what would later become In Legend before joining Van Canto—more exactly during his studies and in the course of a year-long stay in China. According to his own statement, he had already presented his composing ideas to the particular guitarists of his various bands that he played drums in (but especially to his teenage band Jester's Funeral) on the piano, as he has not able to play the guitar. The musical style which developed from there is nowadays known as Hand-hammered Piano Craft.

The Pandemonium EP (limited to 500 copies) was the band's first release and was available for purchase on their very first tour in support of Van Canto in the spring 2010. The EP was recorded with the German producer Charlie Bauerfeind, whom Emig got to know during previous recordings with Van Canto. He has had a lasting musical impact on Bastian Emig. Eventually, the EP was put up for free download on 1 May 2010, coinciding with the launch of the band's official website.

=== Debut album Ballads 'n' Bullets and deal with SPV Records ===
In December 2010, the recording and mastering of In Legend's debut album were finished. The band signed a record deal with the German label SPV. This also marked the first time that a band's album was being released in collaboration with two SPV sub-labels (Steamhammer & Oblivion). Ballads 'n' Bullets was released on 20 May 2011. The 14 songs also included the four songs from the Pandemonium EP. In the run-up to the release, one already had the chance to listen to all songs of the album by means of a specially programmed streaming app at Facebook.

To date, the band has played two tours in order to promote the album (which also led them to Switzerland and the Netherlands) and they also played several headline shows and festivals. Besides, the band shot music videos for four songs off the album ("Pandemonium", "Vortex", "Soul Apart" and "Universe"). A special feature for the promotion of the videos was the conception and creation of a "YouTube DVD", which was supposed to eventually include all songs of the album—either in the form of a professional music video or a self-designed slide show video. The whole thing has been realized as a unique multimedia project with a self-designed menu screen.

=== Second album Stones at Goliath and line-up change ===
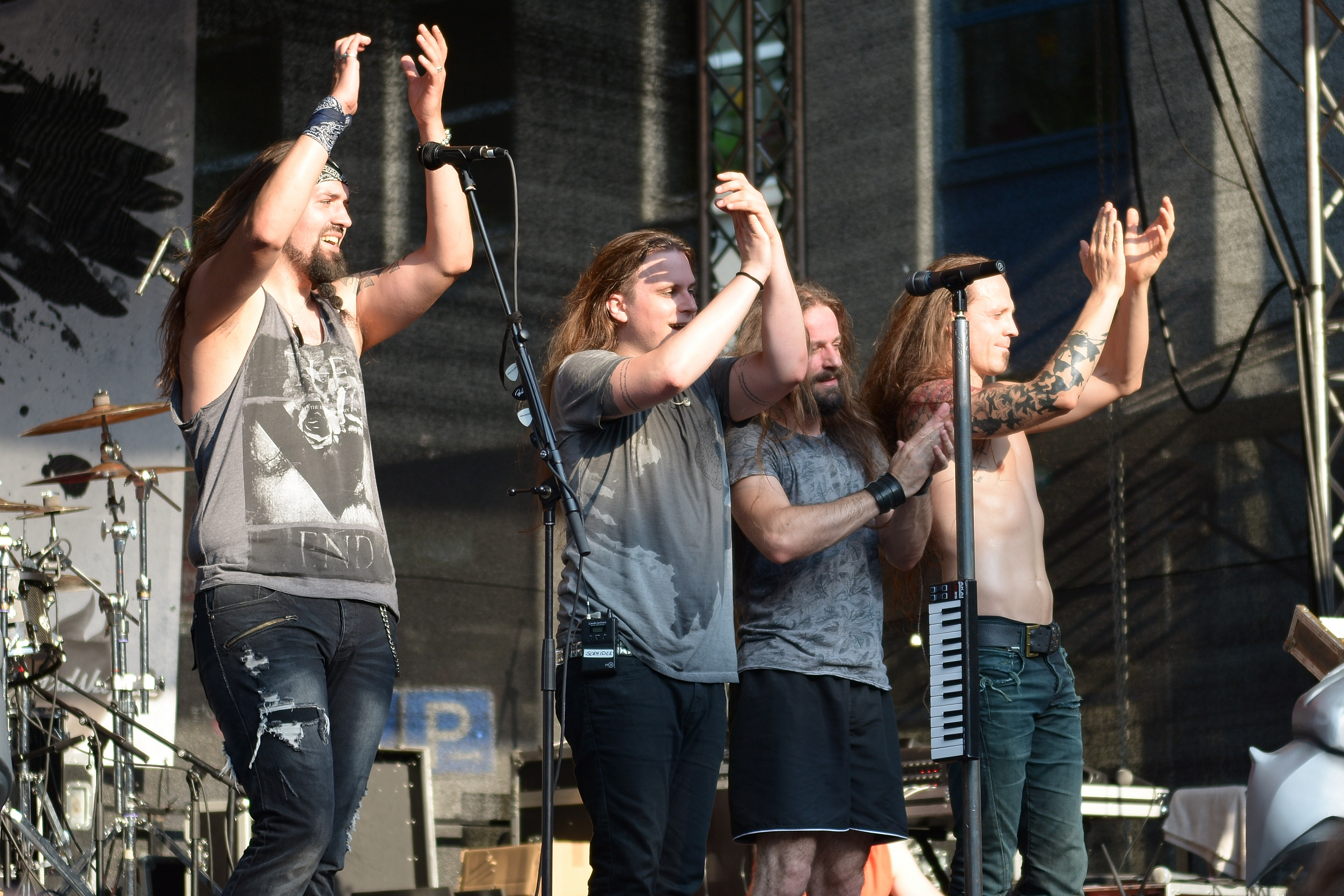
In Legend in 2015

From late 2012 to summer 2013, In Legend were in the studio recording the successor for their debut album. The album, which is called Stones at Goliath, is the first release with Daniel Schmidle who joined the band in 2011.

In June 2014, In Legend announced on Facebook that they had parted ways with bassist Daniel Wicke and drummer Dennis Otto. They were replaced by Paul Perlejewski and Marcos Feminella. In addition to that, a third pianist (Daniel Galmarini) joined the band.

Stones at Goliath was released in January 2015. Apart from the usual instrumentation, the album features violins, a cello (played by Benni Cellini, member of the German band Letzte Instanz), organ sounds, synthies, a real gospel choir. Laura Vargas from the Chilean band Sacramento appears as guest singer. The album is, however, dominated by piano sound and lacks guitars which prompted the Sonic Seducer to compare In Legend to Finnish cello metal band Apocalyptica.

On 24 December 2015, the band released their EP Goliath's End, which can be downloaded for free from the band's website.

== Musical style ==
The In Legend songs on their debut album are strongly heavy metal-influenced, however with a total lack of the guitar sounds of typical metal bands. Instead, In Legend focus on the piano as the main instrument. Bastian Emig himself describes the sound as "Tori Amos on cocaine". Accompanied by aggressive double bass drum parts, a hammering e-bass and the left hand on the piano, Emig creates a heavy, fast-forward sound. In contrast to that, his right hand and his vocals create catchy melodies. Apart from metal influences, the sound also contains elements from classical music, rock, alternative, and pop.

== Background ==
In Legend often use a strong symbolism and repetitive elements. For example, the hammer is a metaphorical leitmotif, which can be found both in the name of their self-created musical style "Hand-hammered Piano Craft" and in the music video for the song "Pandemonium". The nicknames of the musicians are all mentioned in the lyrics of the song "Vortex". Besides, the booklet of the Pandemonium EP already features a line called "Why would I need to tie my heart to your broken wings to touch the sky?". This is the first part of the chorus of the song "Heaven Inside" which is the opener of the band's debut album. A hidden text in the Pandemonium EP gives proof for that: "Congratulation—You just took the first step towards becoming an unscrupulous record label CEO by destroying an artist's piece of work!"

According to own statements, Bastian Emig is not able to read music and has taught himself how to play the piano when he was a child after discovering the piano in his family's living room. During his teenage years, he also wanted to impress the girls, so he liked to play songs by bands such as Guns N' Roses for them.

== Line-up ==
Current members

- Bastian Emig – vocals, piano
- Daniel Galmarini – piano
- Daniel Schmidle – keytar, piano
- Paul Perlejewski – bass
- Marcos Feminella – drums

Past members

- Daniel Wicke – bass
- Dennis Otto – drums

== Discography ==
Studio albums

- 2011: Ballads 'n' Bullets
- 2015: Stones at Goliath

EPs

- 2010: Pandemonium
- 2015: Goliath's End

== See also ==
- Van Canto
- Heavatar
