= Pandemonium (EP) =

Pandemonium EP

EP by In Legend
- Released: 2010
- Genre: Piano rock
- Producers: Bastian Emig; Stefan Schmidt; Charlie Bauerfeind

In Legend chronology
Pandemonium EP (2010)	Ballads 'n' Bullets (2011)

Pandemonium EP is an EP by In Legend, a band by vocalist and pianist Bastian Emig, mostly known as the drummer from the German a cappella metal band Van Canto.

Andrea Friedrich of Metal.de described it as "cohesive and well-produced compilation".

== Track listing ==
All tracks are written by Bastian Emig.

No.	Title	Length
1.	"Pandemonium"	3:51
2.	"Prestinate"	4:02
3.	"The Healer (Inclusive Remedy)"	5:56
4.	"Heya"	4:31

== Personnel ==
In Legend

- Daniel Wicke – bass guitar
- Bastian Emig – drums, lyrics, music, piano, producer, vocals

Crew

- Charlie Bauerfeind – producer
- Jürgen Lusky – mastering
- Stefan Schmidt – producer
