= Break the Silence (Van Canto album) =

Studio album by Van Canto
- Released: 23 September 2011
- Genre: A cappella, power metal
- Length: 62:11
- Label: Napalm Records

Van Canto chronology
Tribe of Force (2010)	Break the Silence (2011)	Dawn of the Brave (2014)

Break the Silence is the fourth studio album by the German a cappella metal band Van Canto, released on 23 September 2011. It reached number 23 in the German charts. It features 13 tracks, five of them being covers, and two of them featuring guest artists: Joakim Brodén (from Sabaton) guest appears in his band's cover "Primo Victoria", Marcus Siepen (from Blind Guardian) guest appears on "Spelled in Waters". "A Storm to Come" is their longest song to date, clocking at 9:13, and is also the first episode of "Peer Returns", Van Canto's theatrical a cappella metal adaption of "Peer Gynt".

== Critical reaction ==
Professional ratings
Review scores
Source	Rating
Black Wind Metal	4/5 stars

Metal.de rated the album 9/10. The Age of Metal called it a "jewel", praising its production and innovation. Metal Storm rated it 8.4/10. Laut.de was less complimentary, suggesting it would be better not to break the silence and calling it "as unnecessary as a goiter".

== Track listing ==
No.	Title	Writer(s)	Length
1.	"If I Die in Battle"	Stefan Schmidt	4:46
2.	"The Seller of Souls"	Bastian Emig & Stefan Schmidt	3:24
3.	"Primo Victoria" (Sabaton cover, featuring Joakim Brodén from Sabaton)	Joakim Brodén & Pär Sundström	3:44
4.	"Dangers in My Head"	Ingo Sterzinger & Stefan Schmidt	4:05
5.	"Black Wings of Hate" (Fading Starlight cover)	Sebastian Scharf & Stefan Schmidt	4:41
6.	"Bed of Nails" (Alice Cooper cover)	Alice Cooper, Desmond Child & Diane Warren	3:37
7.	"Spelled in Waters" (featuring Marcus Siepen from Blind Guardian)	Jan D. Kucharzewski, Marcus Siepen & Stefan Schmidt	4:26
8.	"Neuer Wind"	Stefan Schmidt	3:21
9.	"The Higher Flight"	Stefan Schmidt	5:00
10.	"Master of the Wind" (Manowar cover)	David Shankle & Joey DeMaio	6:09
Total length:			43:13

No.	Title	Writer(s)	Length
11.	"Betrayed" (Runes of Magic)	Inga Scharf	4:57
12.	"Bad to the Bone" (Running Wild cover)	Ian Hamilton Finlay & Rolf Kasparek	4:51
13.	"A Storm to Come" (Peer Returns - featuring Helen Vogt from Flowing Tears)	Bastian Emig & Stefan Schmidt	9:12
Total length:			62:13

== Personnel ==
Van Canto

- Dennis Schunke (Sly) – lead vocals
- Inga Scharf – lead vocals (effects)
- Stefan Schmidt – lower rakkatakka vocals, wahwah solo guitar vocals (rhythm, lead on solos)
- Ross Thompson – higher rakkatakka vocals (lead)
- Ingo Sterzinger (Ike) – lowest dandan vocals (bass)
- Bastian Emig – drums, piano on "Master of the Wind"

Guest musicians

- Joakim Brodén (Sabaton) – male vocals on "Primo Victoria"
- Marcus Siepen (Blind Guardian) – acoustic guitars on "Spelled in Waters"
- Orchestra on "Betrayed"
- Helen Vogt (Flowing Tears) – female vocals on "A Storm to Come"
