= Pandemonium (Torture Squad album) =

Studio album by Torture Squad
- Released: 2003
- Recorded: Mr. Som studio, São Paulo, Brazil
- Genre: Death metal, thrash metal
- Length: 38:41
- Label: Voice Music
- Producer: Heros Trench, Marcello Pompeu

Torture Squad chronology
The Unholy Spell (2001)	Pandemonium (2003)	Hellbound (2008)

Pandemonium is the fourth album of the Brazilian death/thrash metal band Torture Squad

The album was released in 2003, and videoclips for "Pandemonium" and "Horror and Torture" were made. Following the videos, a tour all over Brazil was realized between 2003 and 2005. In 2006 the group embarked on a European tour, headlining in 16 towns in Germany and 4 in Austria. Afterward they played in more cities in Brazil until they participated in the Brazilian pre-selection for the famed Wacken Open Air festival. They eventually won the final in São Paulo, and they represented Brazil at Wacken Battle of the Bands 2007, which they won. This victory won them a contract with Armageddon Records (Germany); Mauricio Nogueira also won the "best guitar player" award, which earned him a brand new Dean guitar and a Marshall pre-amp.

The themes of the songs are basically political/anti-war songs like in "Pandemonium" and "Towers On Fire" (Which deals with the 9/11 attack in the US), poverty like in world of misery, and horror like in "Horror and Torture".

== Track listing ==
No.	Title	Length
1.	"Intro"	0:44
2.	"Horror and Torture"	5:03
3.	"Towers on Fire"	5:14
4.	"World of Misery"	5:14
5.	"Leather Apron"	4:52
6.	"Out of Control"	5:12
7.	"Pandemonium"	4:33
8.	"Requiem for the Headless Rider"	2:50
9.	"The Curse of the Sleepy Hollow"	4:59
Total length:		38:41

== Personnel ==
- Vitor Rodrigues - vocals
- Maurício Nogueira - guitar
- Castor - bass
- Amílcar Christófaro - drums
