= Voices of Fire (album) =

Studio album by Van Canto
- Released: 11 March 2016
- Recorded: July 2014 – January 2016
- Studio: Exajoule Studios, Bingen, Germany; Hofa Studios, Karlsdorf, Germany; Mind EQ Studios, Mistelgau, Germany; Angel Studios, London
- Genre: A cappella; power metal
- Length: 53:02 (Standard Edition); 55:18 (Limited Edition)
- Label: earMUSIC
- Producer: Stefan Schmidt

Van Canto chronology
Dawn of the Brave (2014)	Voices of Fire (2016)	Trust in Rust (2018)

Voices of Fire is the sixth studio album by German a cappella metal band Van Canto. It also features John Rhys-Davies, the London Metro Voices and the children's choir from Chorakademie Dortmund. It is their last album with lead vocalist Sly, who would leave the band in 2017, as well as their only one without bass vocalist Ingo "Ike" Sterzinger, who left the band in the year before the album's release (he did record additional bass vocals and additional backing vocals for the album) and re-joined it in the year after.

== Reception ==
Professional ratings
Review scores
Source	Rating
Metal Temple	5/5 stars
All About the Rock	7.5/10 stars
Metal.de	8/10 stars
Musik Reviews	6/15 stars
Laut.de	2/5 stars
Ghost Cult	8.5/10 stars

The album received mixed to positive reviews by critics.

== Track listing ==
All lyrics are written by Bastian Emig, Stefan Schmidt, Dennis Schunke & Christoph Hardebusch; all music is composed by Bastian Emig & Stefan Schmidt.

No.	Title	Length
1.	"Prologue"	2:56
2.	"Clashings on Armour Plates"	4:06
3.	"Dragonwake"	5:12
4.	"Time and Time Again"	4:22
5.	"All My Life"	4:12
6.	"Battleday's Dawn"	3:28
7.	"Firevows (Join the Journey)"	3:53
8.	"The Oracle"	4:53
9.	"The Betrayal"	4:08
10.	"We Are One"	5:28
11.	"The Bardcall"	4:46
12.	"To Catharsis"	4:53
13.	"Epilogue"	0:50
Total length:		53:02

Limited Edition bonus track
No.	Title	Length
14.	"Hymn"	2:16
Total length:		55:18

== Personnel ==
Van Canto

- Dennis "Sly" Schunke – clean male vocals
- Inga Scharf – female vocals
- Ross Thompson – higher guitar vocals, backing vocals
- Stefan Schmidt – lower guitar vocals, solo guitar vocals, vocals with distortion effect, backing vocals
- Jan Moritz – bass vocals, backing vocals
- Bastian Emig – drums (recorded and produced by Charlie Bauerfeind at Hofa Studios) and percussion (recorded by Armin Haas at Mind EQ Studios)

Additional musicians

- Ingo Sterzinger – additional bass vocals, backing vocals
- Olaf Senkbeil – backing vocals
- Jan Freeseman (Grailknights) – backing vocals
- Tilman Eckelt (Grailknights) – backing vocals
- Carina Hanselmann (Arven) – backing vocals
- Heidi Parviainen – backing vocals
- Metro Voices – choir
- John Rhys-Davies – spoken words
- Chorakademie Dortmund – children's choir

Crew

- Osmar Arroyo – cover art
