= To the Power of Eight =

Studio album by Van Canto
- Released: June 4, 2021
- Studio: Kohlekeller-Studio (drums); Stefan Schmidt's personal studio (vocals)
- Genre: A cappella, power metal
- Length: 48:20
- Label: Napalm
- Producer: Van Canto

Van Canto chronology
Trust in Rust (2018)	To the Power of Eight (2021)

Singles from To the Power of Eight
- 1. "Falling Down" Released: 19 April 2021; 2. "Raise Your Horns" Released: 10 May 2021; 3. "Faith Focus Finish" Released: 1 June 2021; 4. "Dead By the Night" Released: 9 June 2021

To the Power of Eight is the eighth studio album by German a cappella metal band Van Canto, released on 4 June 2021 via Napalm. It features the band's former lead singer Dennis "Sly" Schunke as guest vocalist on all tracks.

== Background, recording and themes ==
After guest singing with them live at the 2019 Summer Breeze Open Air, former lead vocalist Sly was invited as featured singer on one or two of the album's tracks, but he ended up singing all of them after the group was pleased with how the three lead vocalists sounded together.

Drums were recorded in the beginning of September 2020 at Kohlekeller-Studio. Vocals were mostly recorded at Stefan Schmidt's own studio, with Ross Thompson and Jan Moritz recording their parts remotely.

=== Album cover and title ===
The name of the album is a reference to it being the band's eight album and featuring eight musicians in total. The cover depicts lead vocalist Inga Scharf pulling a tanker into a port; the band initially wanted to follow up the cover of their previous album Trust in Rust, so they thought of rust on verdigris in an industrial scenario. The idea of pulling something powerful came as a reference to the word "power" from the title.

=== Song information ===
Of the 12 tracks of the album, eight are new and four are covers.

The title and opening track was released with the album's teaser. "Turn Back Time", the album's ballad, was written in 1999 by Schmidt and drummer Bastian Emig, but they decided to release it only decades later because the lyrics deal with the past.

"Hardrock Padlock" was written as a tribute to the 1980s, especially songs written by Desmond Child for Bon Jovi, Aerosmith and Alice Cooper.

== Release and promotion ==
To the Power of Eight was released as LP Gatefold, CD Digipack and on digital format.

"Falling Down" was released on 19 April 2021. Amon Amarth cover "Raise Your Horns" was released on 10 May 2021. On 1 June 2021, they released the single "Faith Focus Finish". On 9 June 2021, they released the single "Dead By the Night".

== Critical reception ==
Professional ratings
Review scores
Source	Rating
Metal Hammer (Germany)	5.5/7

Writing for the German edition of Metal Hammer, Sarah Angeli praised the album as a whole, criticizing only their cover of Iron Maiden's "Run to the Hills" for not coming "close to the original". She finished her review by saying van Canto "has again succeeded in creating an atmospheric, innovative work of art for the loop."

== Track listing ==
To the Power of Eight track listing
No.	Title	Lyrics	Music	Length
1.	"To the Power of Eight"	Instrumental	Stefan Schmidt, Dennis Schunke, Ross Thompson & Ingo Sterzinger	01:58
2.	"Dead by the Night"	Stefan Schmidt	Stefan Schmidt	03:37
3.	"Faith Focus Finish"	Stefan Schmidt	Stefan Schmidt	04:56
4.	"Falling Down"	Stefan Schmidt	Stefan Schmidt	05:11
5.	"Heads Up High"	Stefan Schmidt	Stefan Schmidt	03:37
6.	"Raise Your Horns" (Amon Amarth cover)	Olavi Mikkonen, Ted Lundström, Johan Hegg, Johan Söderberg	Olavi Mikkonen, Ted Lundström, Johan Hegg, Johan Söderberg	04:24
7.	"Turn Back Time"	Stefan Schmidt	Stefan Schmidt & Bastian Emig	03:41
8.	"Run to the Hills" (Iron Maiden cover)	Steve Harris	Steve Harris	04:00
9.	"Hardrock Padlock"	Stefan Schmidt	Stefan Schmidt	03:36
10.	"Thunderstruck" (AC/DC cover)	Angus Young & Malcolm Young	Angus Young & Malcolm Young	04:52
11.	"From the End"	Stefan Schmidt	Stefan Schmidt	04:54
12.	"I Want It All" (Queen cover)	Freddie Mercury, Brian May, Roger Taylor & John Deacon	Freddie Mercury, Brian May, Roger Taylor & John Deacon	03:34
Total length:				48:20

== Personnel ==
Band members

- Ingo Sterzinger – bass vocals, backing vocals, composer
- Ross Thompson – higher rakkatakka vocals, composer
- Inga Scharf – lead vocals
- Stefan Schmidt – lower rakkatakka vocals, wah-wah vocals, mixing, composer, lyricist
- Bastian Emig – drums, backing vocals, composer
- Jan Moritz – bass vocals, pad, backing vocals
- Hagen Hirschmann – lead vocals, growled vocals

Guest musician

- Philip Dennis Schunke – lead vocals, composer

Crew

- Alexandra Weber – design
- Gerrit Wolf – vocal editing
- Heilemania – artwork
- Jürgen Lusky – mastering
- Kristian "Kohle" Kohlmannslehner – drum engineering, drum mix
- Tim Tronckoe – photography

== Charts ==
Chart performance for To the Power of Eight
Chart (2021)	Peak position
German Albums (Offizielle Top 100)	45
