= Hellbound (Torture Squad album) =

Studio album by Torture Squad
- Released: April 25, 2008
- Recorded: Mr. Som studio, São Paulo, Brazil
- Genre: Death metal, thrash metal
- Length: 51:59
- Label: Voice Music< Wacken
- Producer: Heros Trench, Marcello Pompeu

Torture Squad chronology
Pandemonium (2003)	Hellbound (2008)	Aequilibrium (2010)

Professional ratings
Review scores
Source	Rating
Global Domination	(9/10)
Sonic Dice	(favourable)

Hellbound is a fifth studio album by Brazilian death/thrash metal act Torture Squad, released on April 25, 2008 by Wacken Records.

== Background ==
In 2007, the band is presented in German festival, Wacken Open Air to play in Metal Battle. With a phenomenal performance convincing the audience and the jury of Metal Battle. The result was victory, that culminated a recording contract with the Wacken Records (formerly called Armageddon Music) for the release of a studio album.

== Track listing ==
No.	Title	Length
1.	"MMXII (Intro)"	2:19
2.	"Living for the Kill"	4:52
3.	"The Beast Within"	5:14
4.	"The Fall of Man"	4:58
5.	"Chaos Corporation"	4:58
6.	"Man Behind the Mask"	6:25
7.	"Cyberwar"	6:28
8.	"Twilight for All Mankind"	6:46
9.	"The Four Winds"	2:13
10.	"Hellbound"	7:47
Total length:		51:59

== Personnel ==
- Vitor Rodrigues – vocals
- Maurício Nogueira – guitar
- Castor – bass
- Amílcar Christófaro – drums
