= Heavatar =

German power metal band

- Genres: Power metal
- Years active: 2012–present
- Labels: Napalm Records
- Members: Stefan Schmidt; Sebastian Scharf; David Vogt; Jörg Michael
- Website: heavatar.net

Heavatar is a German power metal band.

== History ==
Heavatar was founded in 2012 by Van Canto founder Stefan Schmidt as a project. The debut album, All My Kingdoms, was released in February 2013 via Napalm Records. Jörg Michael acts as the drummer on this album. The project also features guitarist Sebastian Scharf and bassist David Vogt. Stefan Schmidt himself plays the seven-string guitar and does the lead vocals. Hacky Hackman and Olaf Senkbeil, who were already working together with Blind Guardian, were responsible for the choral arrangements. The cover artwork was done by the fantasy artist Kerem Beyit.

== Musical style ==
The band's music contains classical motifs, from composers like Bach, Beethoven and Paganini, and embeds it into power metal compositions.

== Band members ==
- Stefan Schmidt – rhythm guitar, lead vocals
- Sebastian Scharf – lead guitar
- David Vogt – bass guitar
- Jörg Michael – drums

== Discography ==
- 2013: All My Kingdoms (Napalm Records)
- 2018: The Annihilation (earMusic)

== See also ==
- Van Canto
- In Legend
