= Dawn of the Brave =

Studio album by Van Canto
- Released: 7 February 2014
- Recorded: 2014
- Genre: A cappella, power metal
- Length: 49:50 (Standard Edition); 1:17:28 (Mediabook Edition); 59:20 (Earbook DVD)
- Label: Napalm Records
- Producer: Charlie Bauerfeind

Van Canto chronology
Break the Silence (2011)	Dawn of the Brave (2014)	Voices of Fire (2016)

Singles from Dawn of the Brave
- 1. "Badaboom" Released: 13 December 2013

Dawn of the Brave is the fifth studio album by the German a cappella metal band Van Canto. It was released on 7 February 2014. The album contains nine own compositions and four covers.

For the first time since their debut album, there have been no guest musicians performing in any of the tracks. However, an ensemble of 200 fans were invited to record a choir for some tracks. In the album is included "Crazy Train" from Ozzy Osbourne but is not in the track list.

Two videos were released for the album: One for "Badaboom", which features the members and other invited people dressed as metal musicians such as Lars Ulrich and Tony Iommi; and another for the Annie Lennox cover "Into the West".

The album was also released in a special earbook edition, containing many pictures of the band and of the 200 fans who recorded vocals for the album, the regular CD, the bonus CD with orchestral versions and remixes of some Van Canto songs and a bonus DVD with their performance at the 2011 Wacken Open Air.

== Track listing ==
Standard edition & limited mediabook (disc 1)
No.	Title	Writer(s)	Length
1.	"Dawn of the Brave"	Stefan Schmidt	1:08
2.	"Fight for Your Life"	Stefan Schmidt	3:59
3.	"To the Mountains"	Stefan Schmidt	4:05
4.	"Badaboom"	Stefan Schmidt	3:31
5.	"The Final Countdown" (Europe cover)	Joey Tempest	4:55
6.	"Steel Breaker"	Stefan Schmidt	3:40
7.	"The Awakening"	Stefan Schmidt	4:13
8.	"The Other Ones"	Stefan Schmidt	4:18
9.	"Holding Out for a Hero" (Bonnie Tyler cover)	Dean Pitchford & Jim Steinman	3:51
10.	"Unholy"	Ingo Sterzinger & Stefan Schmidt	3:28
11.	"My Utopia"	Bastian Emig & Stefan Schmidt	5:13
12.	"Into the West" (Annie Lennox cover – taken from the soundtrack for the motion picture The Lord of the Rings: The Return of the King)	Fran Walsh, Howard Shore, Annie Lennox	4:25
13.	"Paranoid" (Black Sabbath cover)	Geezer Butler, Tony Iommi, Ozzy Osbourne, Bill Ward	3:04
Total length:			49:50

Limited mediabook (disc 2)
No.	Title	Writer(s)	Length
1.	"If I Die in Battle" (orchestral version)	Stefan Schmidt	4:45
2.	"My Voice" (orchestral version)	Stefan Schmidt	5:29
3.	"Take to the Sky" (orchestral version)	Stefan Schmidt	4:24
4.	"Neuer Wind" (Jovian Spin remix)	Stefan Schmidt	3:48
5.	"Lost Forever" (acoustic version)	Stefan Schmidt	5:01
6.	"Last Night of the Kings" (choir version)	Dennis Schunke & Stefan Schmidt	4:11
Total length:			27:38

Bonus DVD for the earbook edition
No.	Title	Writer(s)	Length
1.	"Intro"	Van Canto
2.	"Lost Forever"	Stefan Schmidt
3.	"Wishmaster" (Nightwish cover)	Tuomas Holopainen
4.	"One to Ten" (featuring Victor Smolski)	Ross Thompson & Stefan Schmidt
5.	"Rebellion" (Grave Digger cover – featuring Chris Boltendahl from Grave Digger)	Grave Digger
6.	"Primo Victoria" (Sabaton cover – featuring Joakim Brodén from Sabaton)	Joakim Brodén, Pär Sundström
7.	"To Sing a Metal Song"	Stefan Schmidt
8.	"The Bard's Song" (Blind Guardian cover)	Hansi Kürsch, André Olbrich
9.	"Water, Fire, Heaven, Earth"	Stefan Schmidt
10.	"The Mission"	Stefan Schmidt
11.	"Kings of Metal" (Manowar cover)	Ross Friedman, Joey DeMaio
12.	"Fear of the Dark" (Iron Maiden cover)	Steve Harris
Total length:			59:20

== Personnel ==
Van Canto

- Dennis Schunke (Sly) – lead vocals
- Inga Scharf – lead vocals (effects)
- Stefan Schmidt – lower rakkatakka vocals, wahwah solo guitar vocals (rhythm, lead on solos)
- Ross Thompson – higher rakkatakka vocals (lead)
- Ingo Sterzinger (Ike) – lowest dandan vocals (bass)
- Bastian Emig – drums

Guest musicians

- 200 Van Canto fans – choir
- Jovian Spin – remix (track 4 on disc 2 of the Limited Mediabook)

Technical staff

- Ronald Prent – mixing
