= All My Kingdoms =

Opus I – All My Kingdoms

Studio album by Heavatar
- Released: February 22, 2013
- Genre: Heavy metal, a cappella
- Label: Napalm

All My Kingdoms (Opus I) is the debut album by German power metal band Heavatar.

The songs are inspired by classical composers Ludwig van Beethoven, Johann Sebastian Bach, Niccolò Paganini and Georges Bizet.

== Track listing ==
No.	Title	Length
1.	"Replica" (based on Johann Sebastian Bach's Toccata and Fugue in D minor, BWV 565)	4:39
2.	"Abracadabra" (based on Niccolò Paganini's Caprice No. 24)	3:34
3.	"All My Kingdoms" (based on Johann Sebastian Bach's Das Wohltemperierte Klavier Prelude in C-minor)	4:09
4.	"Elysium at Dawn" (based on Ludwig van Beethoven's Für Elise)	4:20
5.	"Long Way Home" (based on Georges Bizet's L'Arlésienne)	5:35
6.	"Born to Fly" (based on Johann Sebastian Bach's Prelude in D-minor, BWV 999)	4:19
7.	"Luna! Luna!" (based on Ludwig van Beethoven's Mondscheinsonate (Piano Sonata No. 14 in C-sharp minor))	4:56
8.	"The Look Above" (based on Ludwig van Beethoven's Symphony No. 7 in A-major Op. 92)	11:05
9.	"To the Metal"	4:52

== Personnel ==
Band members

- David Vogt – bass guitar
- Jörg Michael – drums
- Sebastian Scharf – lead guitar
- Stefan Schmidt – lyrics, music, vocals, rhythm guitar, producer

Choir

- Bastian Emig
- Dennis Schunke
- Inga Scharf
- Ingo Sterzinger
- Olaf Senkbeil
- Ross Thompson
- Hacky Hackmann

Crew

- Thomas Ewerhard – logo artwork
- Kerm Beyit – cover artwork
- Saskia Horländer – photography
- Tim Rochels – photography
- Dynamedion – orchestration on track 8
