= List of Kaze no Stigma episodes =

Cover art of the first DVD compilation released by Kadokawa.

Kaze no Stigma (風の聖痕; lit. Stigma of the Wind) is an anime series directed by Jun'ichi Sakata and produced by Gonzo. They are based on the light novel series Kaze no Stigma by Takahiro Yamato, and adapt the source material over twenty-four episodes. The plot of the episodes is based on the return of Kazuma Kannagi to Japan after being exiled by his clan, and his subsequent interactions with his clan.

The series aired from April 2007 to September 2007 in Japan on thirteen networks, with Chiba TV, Fukui TV, Tokyo MX TV, TV Hokkaido, and TV Saitama airing the episodes first on 11 April 2007. The remaining networks began airing the episodes later in May, with the exception of Kumamoto Broadcasting, which broadcast the first episode on 14 May 2007.

The series is dubbed and licensed in North America by Funimation Entertainment. Another English dubbed version by Animax Asia aired on their network from 19 May to 21 June 2010.

Four pieces of theme music are used for the episodes; one opening theme and three ending themes. The opening theme is "blast of wind" by Saori Kiuji. The ending themes are Kiuju's "Hitorikiri no Sora" and "Matataki no Kiwoku" by Ayumi Fujimura, Yuka Inokuchi and Shizuka Itō, with either played for all episodes save episode twelve, which features Sakai Tanako's "Tsuki Hana no Inori." A single for "blast of wind" was released on 30 May 2007, and a single for the closing themes was released on 18 August 2007.

Twelve DVD compilations, containing two episodes of the anime, were released by Kadokawa in Japan, from 24 August 2007 to 25 July 2008.

== Episodes ==
No.	Title	Directed by	Written by	Original release date
1	"Return of the Wind"; Transliteration: "Kaze no Kikan" (Japanese: 風の帰還)	Junichi Sakata	Mayori Sekijima	12 April 2007
Kazuma Kannagi, who was exiled four years earlier for his defeat and his lack of talent in fire magic, returns to Japan with a changed name and tremendous skill in wind magic. Several killings in the Kannagi house committed by a powerful wind user leads his former family, the Kannagi house, into believing Kazuma is taking revenge for his exile. Although he claims to be innocent, Kazuma prepares for an all out war with the Kannagi family.
2	"Confrontation With the Past"; Transliteration: "Kako to no Taiketsu" (Japanese: 過去との対決)	Akira Katō	Masashi Kubota	19 April 2007
Kazuma's father, Gemna Kannagi tries to bring him back to the Kannagi family's main house to answer some questions, but Kazuma wants to fight him instead. He ends up defeating his father with a special wind technique. Later, he meets his brother, Ren Kannagi again after four years, but the powerful wind user from before kidnaps his brother. Kazuma vows to bring him back.
3	"The Head of the Kannagi Family"; Transliteration: "Kannagi Sōke" (Japanese: 神凪宗家)	Kōji Hōri	Tomoyasu Ōkubo	26 April 2007
In order to bring back his kidnapped brother, Kazuma meets with the head of the Kannagi family, Jūgo Kannagi, to exchange information. The rebellion of the Wind Fang clan serving the Kannagi comes to light, and Kazuma proposes a rescue plan based on cooperation between him and Ayano.
4	"The Contractor"; Transliteration: "Kontorakutā" (Japanese: 契約者(コントラクター))	Hidetoshi Ōmori	Kiyoko Yoshimura	3 May 2007
Leaving Ayano behind to hold off Ryūya Kazamaki, Kazuma proceeds to rescue Ren. However, with Ayano defeated, Ryūya manages to merge with the released demon. Ayano, Kazuma, and Ren must combine their forces to stop the demon's advance. In a last-ditch attempt, Kazuma prepares to activate his contract.
5	"The One Who Casts Aside Doubt"; Transliteration: "Mayoi wo Suteta Mono" (Japanese: 迷いを捨てた者)	Yasuhiro Kuroda	Tatsuhiko Urahata	10 May 2007
Misao, the sister of one of the Kannagi clansmen killed at the construction site in the first episode, is out to kill Kazuma for revenge. However, neither her own power nor her hired assassins can scratch him. Just as she contemplates suicide, a mysterious boy, Michael Harley, approaches her and offers to fulfill her desires.
6	"The Price of Power"; Transliteration: "Chikara no Daishō" (Japanese: 力の代償)	Hiroyuki Okuno	Tatsuhiko Urahata	17 May 2007
The Kannagi family hires Kazuma to investigate a string of murders, but transfer the job to the police investigators and the Ōgami family once it becomes clear that Misao is involved. With her own family planning to eradicate Misao, only Kazuma does not wish to give up on her, and only Ayano is powerful enough to stand in Kazuma's way.
7	"The Cost of a Soul"; Transliteration: "Tamashii no Nedan" (Japanese: 魂の値段)	Shunichi Yoshizawa	Tatsuhiko Urahata	24 May 2007
After being shortly delayed by Ayano's surprise attack, Kazuma, together with Ayano and Ren, faces off against Misao, who is still powerless against him. Michael Harley informs Misao that she will never be able to defeat Kazuma, and subsequently uses Misao's body and her accumulated life energy to create a dragon. Ayano, Ren and Kazuma must destroy the dragon while not harming Misao. However while fighting Kazuma gets injured and tells Ayano that he got his wind power to protect the people he cares for.
8	"Ayano's Disaster"; Transliteration: "Ayano-chan no Sainan" (Japanese: 綾乃ちゃんの災難)	Akira Katō	Kiyoko Yoshimura	31 May 2007
Ayano is sent to investigate a hitodama that has been sighted at Seiryō Academy, her own school. Kazuma is hired as her bodyguard, and even Ayano's friends, Yukari and Nanase tag along. However, the disturbance turns out to be the work of the mischievous pixie Tiana, and Ayano becomes a target for her pranks.
9	"Meeting Under the Moon"; Transliteration: "Gekka no Deai" (Japanese: 月下の出会い)	Kōji Hōri	Mayori Sekijima	7 June 2007
Ren meets a young girl, Ayumi, who has escaped from the Tsuwabuki family, the most powerful clan of earth mages. Seeing how badly they treat her, Ren decides to use his power to protect her at the cost of starting a conflict between the Kannagi and Tsuwabuki families. Meanwhile, Kazuma accepts a mission from Tiana's tribe to retrieve the pixie heirloom stolen by the Tsuwabuki family.
10	"The One to be Protected"; Transliteration: "Mamoru Beki Hito" (Japanese: 護るべき人)	Hiroyuki Okuno	Masashi Kubota	14 June 2007
Ayumi tells Ren she wants to go to the beach, where they meet the Tsuwabukis. It is then that Ayumi is revealed to not be human, but rather a clone, created for the Taisai ritual for sealing Mount Fuji. Meanwhile, Kazuma is still watching the Tsuwabukis and waiting for the treasure.
11	"Each Decision"; Transliteration: "Sorezore no Ketsui" (Japanese: それぞれの決意)	Jirō Fujimoto	Tomoyasu Ōkubo	21 June 2007
Ren and Ayano go to the Tsuwabukis' mansion to meet Ayumi and try to save her, while Kazuma arrives and helps them along. Ren resolves to save Ayumi's life by destroying the main problem itself - the behemoth that is sealed in Mount Fuji.
12	"Confession Under the Moon"; Transliteration: "Gekka no Kokuhaku" (Japanese: 月下の告白)	Yasuhiro Kuroda	Masashi Kubota	28 June 2007
Ayano is having trouble fighting, whilst Kazuma takes Ren and Ayumi from the cavern, exiting through the top. This causes the behemoth to be freed and Ren, Kazuma and Ayano begin the fight against it. Ayumi helps the team out as best she can and suppresses the powers of the behemoth, giving Kazuma, Ren and Ayano time to defeat it. But in the end she dies because she used up too much power to help them and couldn't live the rest of her life with Ren.
13	"Let's Go to the Amusement Park!"; Transliteration: "Yūenchi ni Ikō!" (Japanese: 遊園地に行こう!)	Shunichi Yoshizawa	Tatsuhiko Urahata	5 July 2007
Ayano and Kazuma get set up on a date at an amusement park by Ayano's father (under the guise of an investigation), where three peeping toms prove no match for Ayano's rage. Ayano's friends follow in disguise to snoop on her date and in the meantime take a batch of photos.
14	"Another Ayano Disaster"; Transliteration: "Ayano-chan no Saranaru Sainan" (Japanese: 綾乃ちゃんの更なる災難)	Akira Katō	Kiyoko Yoshimura	13 July 2007
An American fire mage, Catherine McDonald, confronts Ayano while she is having dinner with Kazuma. Her purpose is to bring the title of the strongest clan of fire mages to the McDonalds and obtain the Enraiha. Ayano wins, but causes major damage to the building and her dress. As a result, Kazuma treats her to ramen instead.
15	"Catherine Returns"; Transliteration: "Kyasarin Ritānzu" (Japanese: キャサリン·リターンズ)	Shinji Osamura	Tomoyasu Ōkubo	20 July 2007
Catherine challenges Ayano to a fight. While awaiting for the day of the fight Catherine hires Kazuma to be her coach, and falls in love with him. As a result, Catherine makes a proposal to Ayano: if she wins, she takes Kazuma back to America with her, and if she loses, he stays. Ayano ends up winning, but Catherine decides to stay anyway.
16	"Father and Son"; Transliteration: "Chichi to Ko to" (Japanese: 父と子と)	Hiroyuki Okuno	Masashi Kubota	27 July 2007
Jūgo once again sets up Ayano and Kazuma, but this time he gets her friends to invite the two to a hot spring. Just when things seem to go Jūgo's way, Kirika Tachibana and Genma, Kazuma's father, end up at the same hot spring as Kazuma. Every time they meet each other, Genma and Kazuma fights and ends up destroying miscellaneous sections of the hot springs. However, in the end, it seems that their fights were just their way of communicating with each other.
17	"How to Defeat a Magic User"; Transliteration: "Mahōtsukai no Taoshi Kata" (Japanese: 魔法使いの倒し方)	Kōji Hōri	Mayori Sekijima	3 August 2007
Normal teenagers, who were once weak or have been hurt, become magicians in enormous amounts. Not only are these "magicians" taking advantage of their newly acquired powers, but they also talk like they are playing a game, using words such as "level up." Kazuma, Ayano, and Nanase are asked to investigate the problem, and Nanase shows just how a normal teenager can beat a magic user. Kazuma sees a girl that appears to be Tsui Ling after defeating one of the new mages.
18	"Tokyo RPG"; Transliteration: "Tōkyō RPG" (Japanese: 東京RPG)	Itsuki Imazaki	Kiyoko Yoshimura	10 August 2007
Ren and his friends encounter one of those "magicians" during one of their outings and are attacked by a fire-using one. Ren uses his powers to defeat the "magician," who reveals information on the whereabouts of the "game" known as Pandemonium. Ren decided to check the place suspected to be the headquarters with this information, discovering that it is in another dimension. As he prepares to leave, he is suddenly teleported inside the building. Meanwhile, Kirika calls for Kazuma to regroup at the Kannagi's place to discuss further plans.
19	"Pandemonium"; Transliteration: "Pandemoniumu" (Japanese: 万魔殿(パンデモニウム))	Yasuhiro Kuroda	Kiyoko Yoshimura	17 August 2007
Kirika briefs everyone about the recent events and its connection to the game Pandemonium which caused the players to "download" youma through the net unknowingly. After they learn that Ren has been kidnapped, Kazuma, Ayano, and Kirika enter Pandemonium. Ayano fights Lapis, who has the appearance of Tsui Ling. Meanwhile, Kazuma finds Ren, and identifies the man behind Pandemonium as Bernherdt Rhodes, a former enemy he defeated in the past.
20	"The Remnant of the Emerald"; Transliteration: "Suishoku no Zan'ei" (Japanese: 翠色の残影)	Akira Katō	Tomoyasu Ōkubo	24 August 2007
Kazuma questions Bernhardt about Lapis and denies that the girl is Tsui Ling, whom Erwin (Bernhardt's master) sacrificed to a demon. Bernhardt in turn, replies that the girl Lapis was that of what remained of Tsui Ling whom Kazuma failed to protect due to his lack of power. As Kazuma attempts to attack Bernhardt, Lapis deflects the blow and shows her power as a "Swordsmaster" by slicing in half the building they were in. Kazuma saves Ren, Ayano, and Kirika but disappears soon after. Back at the Kannagi home, Kirika informs them that a new Pandemonium has appeared and has granted "class changes" to some of its players. Meanwhile, Kazuma, brooding over the happiness of his past with Tsui Ling, resolves to kill Bernhardt and Lapis.
21	"The Raging Wind Mage"; Transliteration: "Kyōran no Fūjutsushi" (Japanese: 狂乱の風術師)	Shūji Miyazaki	Tatsuhiko Urahata	31 August 2007
Since the new Pandemonium appeared, battles held every night which pitched "magicians" together in a battle and the winner gains experience points. Kazuma appears at these battles, brutally attacking the combatants and asking them on the location of Pandemonium. He goes so far as to assault Catherine and allow Nanase to be kidnapped. Afterwards, Kirika informs Ayano that Kazuma has regressed to his former cold-hearted persona, and only Ayano can bring him back.
22	"Determination and Hesitation"; Transliteration: "Ketsui to Shunjun to" (Japanese: 決意と逡巡と)	Kōji Hōri	Tomoyasu Ōkubo	7 September 2007
Ren, Suzuhara and Serizawa witness Kazuma battle with one of the magicians. Later, Yukari goes to a meeting of seeds, where Utsumi tells them that Pandemonium will appear in the park at midnight and that they may achieve great power if they went there. At Pandemonium, Utsumi tells Bernhardt that he wants to take over and that he will kill Bernhardt. However, Bernhardt responds by saying that he was the one who gave Utsumi power in the first place.
23	"The Crimson Flame"; Transliteration: "Kōen" (Japanese: 紅炎)	Hiroyuki Okuno	Masashi Kubota	14 September 2007
At the hospital Catherine speaks with Ayano, and increases her resolve to save Kazuma. Ayano and Ren convince Jūgo and Genma to let them try to bring Kazuma back after Genma states that he will kill Kazuma and Bernhardt. When Pandemonium appears, Ayano and Ren encounter Kazuma. Kazuma tells Ayano and Ren that he is not trying to destroy Pandemonium because of Tsui Ling but simply because he wants to kill Bernhardt. Ayano summons Enraiha and attacks Kazuma. She thinks about what she learned from Kazuma and unknowingly uses the Crimson Flame. She manages to convince Kazuma to stop killing innocent people. Kazuma realizes that he has two new people in his life, Ayano and Ren, and together the three set out to destroy Pandemonium.
24	"Protectors of the Wind"; Transliteration: "Kaze no mamorishi mono" (Japanese: 風の護りしもの)	Yasuhiro Kuroda	Mayori Sekijima	21 September 2007
Kazuma, Ayano and Ren encounter Lapis, who begins the summoning ritual of Belial, the Prince of Demons of the north of Hell. Lapis reveals she is attempting to become "human" through others' pain. Kazuma and Ayano attack Lapis, who retreats as Belial's summoning proceeds. By combining their powers, Kazuma, Ayano, and Ren manage to repel Belial. Afterwards, Bernhardt and Lapis arrival, but Gemna's arrival convinces Bernhardt not to kill them. Kazuma asks Lapis what were the final thoughts of Tsui Ling, who reveals that Tsui Ling wanted Kazuma to die. At the Kannagi residence, Kazuma reveals he has gotten used to his past and will focus on his future, which incenses Ayano, who claims that Kazuma should rely on her. Kazuma agrees, but gives Ayano a slap on the rear to show his acceptance to the new partnership, resulting in Ayano falling in the pond before angrily chasing him around the courtyard (with Enraiha) as the members of the Kannagi family have a peaceful lunch. Then Ren sees how close Ayano and Kazuma are with the rest of his friends and Nanase and Yukari all in agreement.
