= Torture Squad =

Brazilian death/thrash metal band

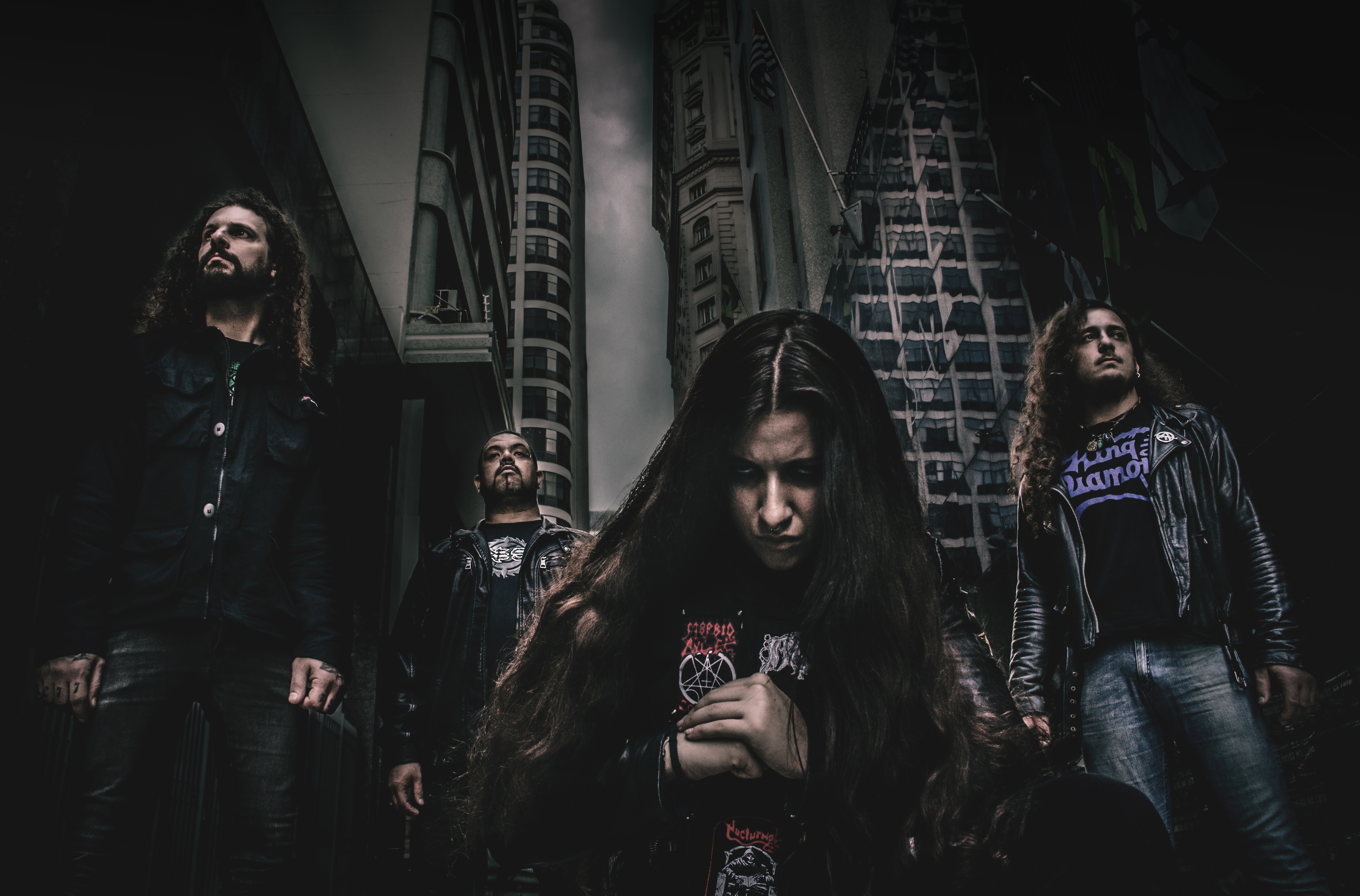

Background information
- Origin: São Paulo City, São Paulo, Brazil
- Genres: Death metal; thrash metal
- Years active: 1990–present
- Label: Brutal Records / Sony Music
- Members: Castor; Amílcar Christófaro; May Puertas; Rene Simionato
- Past members: Marcelo Dirceu; Cristiano Fusco; Marcelo Fusco; Fúlvio Pelli; Mauricio Nogueira; Augusto Lopes; Vitor Rodrigues; André Evaristo
- Website: www.torturesquad.net.br

Torture Squad is a Brazilian death/thrash metal band, founded in 1990.

== History ==
Three years after being founded in 1990, the band entered a more professional phase, in a line-up with founder Cristiano Fusco on guitar, Wagner "Castor" on bass, Amilcar Christofaro on drums, and Vitor Rodrigues as frontman and singer. They started touring in and around São Paulo and soon recorded a demo, released in 1993, A Soul in Hell. Their first CD was Shivering (1995); their break-through came with Asylum of Shadows (1999).

Their 2001 album, The Unholy Spell, came right after the band's first tour in Germany. In 2002, Cristiano Fusco left the band, and the band hired Mauricio Nogueira (a seasoned studio musician who played for Krisiun as well as other local bands like In Hell and Zoltar), and went on their first Brazilian tour.

Pandemonium produced by Marcello Pompeu and Heros Trench (Korzus) was released in 2003. The CD was supported by a TV video clip for "Pandemonium" and "Horror and Torture." Again, the band played all over Brazil. Then, in 2006 Torture Squad embarked on a European tour, headlining in 16 towns in Germany and 4 in Austria. Afterward they played in more cities in Brazil until they participated in the Brazilian pre-selection for the famed Wacken Open Air festival. They eventually won the final in São Paulo, and they represented Brazil at Wacken Battle of the Bands 2007, which they won. This victory won them a contract with Armageddon Records (Germany); Mauricio Nogueira also won the "best guitar player" award, which earned him a brand new Dean guitar and a Marshall pre-amp.

Hellbound, was released in May 2008 by Armageddon, not long after Mauricio Nogueira left the band for personal reasons and Augusto Lopes (Eternal Malediction) was announced as the new guitarist. In 2008, Torture Squad embarked on a 60-date European tour, which will include a show at Wacken Open Air.

The year of 2009 started pretty well for Torture Squad. After the release of Hellbound and its excellent repercussion in Brazil, Europe and the United States, it was followed by a European tour with two of the world's major thrash metal bands, Overkill and Exodus. The tour began in mid February in London, where the Brazilian group performed for the first time, and included 12 more shows in countries like Spain, Germany, Italy, the Netherlands, Switzerland and the Czech Republic.

Their album “AEquilibrium” was released in Europe in August 2010 by Wacken Records / H'art / Zebralution / SAOL. They recorded a new version for the title track of their third album “The Unholy Spell” which is included as bonus track with the title of “The Unholy Spell 2010”. The album was recorded in São Paulo/Brazil, at Norcal Studios with producers Brendan Duffey and Adriano Daga.

In January 2011, guitarist Augusto Lopes left the band and was replaced by André Evaristo. Even with the line up changing, the band did not stop, remaining on the road until July of the same year. One month later, the band crossed the ocean again, for the European part of the Æquilibrium Tour 2011, with more than 40 concerts in 12 countries until the end of October, including the third concert on the German festival Wacken Open Air, turning Torture Squad into the only Brazilian band to play three times at the festival.

In March 2012, the frontman Vitor Rodrigues left the band. Soon after that, the band turned out to be a power trio with André Evaristo taking the lead vocals along with the guitar. With this line up they played with important concerts and festivals in South America, which is held in Quito city, the capital city of Ecuador, for an approximate audience of 25,000 people.

In 2013, the band celebrated the 20th anniversary of the release of the demo-tape A Soul in Hell, their first studio recording, which was celebrated in the Twenty Years Torturing People Tour 1993–2013, that started in May in Europe, alongside Artillery, Gama Bomb and Tantara, with 18 concerts in 20 days. From April to August, 2013, the band chose, again, Norcal Studios to record their seventh studio album, Esquadrão de Tortura (Torture Squad in Portuguese), and reprising the association with Brendan Duffey and Adriano Daga as producers. Esquadrão de Torture was the first work recorded by the band as a trio and the first lyrical concept album, narrating, in chronological order, the period in which Brazil was governed by a military regime (from 1964 to 1985), being also the first album to have a title in Portuguese. The official release date was November 15, Brazil's Republic Proclamation Day.

In July and August 2014, the band did their second South American tour with thirteen shows in four countries; Chile, Peru, Ecuador and Paraguay. Finishing the year in their hometown São Paulo / SP on December, 20, recording its show which was released in mid 2015 on DVD and CD and titled “Coup d´État Live”. In September 2015, vocalist / guitarist André Evaristo left Torture Squad to pursue other personal projects, bringing the band back to its traditional line-up as a quartet featuring Mayara “Undead” Puertas on vocals and Rene Simionato on guitars, continuing the tour of “Coup D´État Live”. Already with their new line up, the band went to studio to record the EP “Return of Evil”, with four songs: the new “Return of Evil”, “Swallow Your Reality” and “Iron Squad”, and the new version of “Dreadful Lies”, originally released in the 1998 first album Shivering. The EP will also had a multimedia track with the video clip of “Return of the Evil” and a mini documentary of the EP recording sessions, and the videos of “Dreadful Lies” and “Iron Squad” exclusively made for the EP, which was released in February 2016.

In September 2016, the band made a historic tour in Brazil playing 28 gigs in 32 days throughout the country from north to south. Soon after the Brazilian tour, the band did a European tour comprising 19 gigs in seven countries. The Return of Evil tour finished in February 2017, doing 13 shows during 16 days in the country side of São Paulo and Paraná.

In April 2017, the band started the recording of their eighth album entitled Far Beyond Existence released on July 13 (World Rock Day). In August 2017, they started the Far Beyond Existence Tour as headliner, alongside Brazilian bands Hatefulmurder, Warcursed and Reckoning Hour, performing 26 shows in 30 days all over Brazil. In November, after seven years, the band returned to Buenos Aires / Argentina for a mini tour of four dates.

Starting the year 2018, the band returned to the road. The "Zumbis Squad Tour" undertook eight shows in the country side of São Paulo in February. In March, the band made another South American tour, playing in Colombia, Ecuador, Peru, Bolivia and Chile.

== Band members ==
=== Current members ===
- Mayara Puertas – vocals, occasionally acoustic guitar and keyboards (2015–present)
- Rene Simionato – guitar (2015–present)
- Castor – bass, backing vocals (1993–present)
- Amílcar Christófaro – drums (1993–present)

=== Former members ===
- Cristiano Fusco – guitar (1990–2002; died 2025)
- Marcelo Fusco – drums (1990–1993)
- Marcelo Dirceu – bass, vocals (1990–1993)
- Vitor Rodrigues – vocals (1993–2012)
- Mauricio Nogueira – guitar (2002–2008)
- Augusto Lopes – guitar (2008–2011)
- André Evaristo – guitar (2011–2015), vocals (2012–2015)

== Discography ==
Demo

- A Soul in Hell (1993)

Studio albums

- Shivering (1995)
- Asylum of Shadows (1999)
- The Unholy Spell (2001)
- Pandemonium (2003)
- Hellbound (2008)
- Æquilibrium (2010)
- Esquadrão de Tortura (2013)
- Far Beyond Existence (2017)
- Devilish (2023)

Live albums

- Death, Chaos and Torture Alive (2004)
- Coup D´État Live (2015)

EPs

- Chaos Corporation (2007)
- Possessed by Horror (2015)
- Return of Evil (2016)
- Unknown Abyss (2021)

Compilation

- Torture Squad (2017)
- Torture Years (2019)

== Videography ==
- Death, Chaos and Torture Alive (2004)
- Coup D´État Live (2015)
