= Tribe of Force =

Studio album by Van Canto
- Released: 9 March 2010
- Genre: A cappella, power metal
- Length: 55:37
- Label: Napalm Records
- Producer: Charlie Bauerfeind

Van Canto chronology
Hero (2008)	Tribe of Force (2010)	Break the Silence (2011)

Professional ratings
Review scores
Source	Rating
AllMusic	4/5 stars
Sea of Tranquility	4/5 stars

Tribe of Force is the third album by German a capella metal band Van Canto, released in March 2010. It is the band's first release with Napalm Records.

The track listing features 13 tracks, two of them being covers ("Master of Puppets" by Metallica and "Rebellion" by Grave Digger), and three of them featuring guest artists: Victor Smolski (Rage) on "One to Ten", Tony Kakko (Sonata Arctica) on "Hearted", and Chris Boltendahl (Grave Digger) on "Rebellion".

Two of this album's songs ("Water, Fire, Heaven, Earth" & "Hearted") have been, among Within Temptation's "Our Farewell", the inspiration for "Forevermore", a song by the Dutch symphonic metal band Epica, featuring the mildly-autistic Ruurd Woltring. The recording of this song was made possible thanks to the Dutch TV show Niks te gek! ("Nothing too crazy"), in which mentally disabled people get their wishes granted.

== Track listing ==
No.	Title	Writer(s)	Length
1.	"Lost Forever"	Stefan Schmidt	4:44
2.	"To Sing a Metal Song"	Stefan Schmidt	3:24
3.	"One to Ten" (featuring Victor Smolski)	Ross Thompson & Stefan Schmidt	4:06
4.	"I Am Human"	Ingo Sterzinger & Stefan Schmidt	3:56
5.	"My Voice"	Stefan Schmidt	5:30
6.	"Rebellion (The Clans Are Marching)" (Grave Digger cover feat. Chris Boltendahl)	Chris Boltendahl, Thomas Göttlich & Uwe Walter Lulis	4:05
7.	"Last Night of the Kings"	Dennis Schunke & Stefan Schmidt	3:52
8.	"Tribe of Force"	Stefan Schmidt	3:17
9.	"Water, Fire, Heaven, Earth"	Stefan Schmidt	3:32
10.	"Master of Puppets" (Metallica cover)	Clifford Lee Burton, James Alan Hetfield, Kirk L. Hammett & Lars Ulrich	8:23
11.	"Magic Taborea" (Runes of Magic)	Alex Pfeffer & Inga Scharf	3:22
12.	"Hearted" (feat. Tony Kakko)	Stefan Schmidt	4:00
13.	"Frodo's Dream"	Stefan Schmidt	3:06
Total length:			55:17

== Personnel ==
Band members

- Dennis Schunke (Sly) – lead vocals
- Inga Scharf – lead vocals (effects)
- Stefan Schmidt – lower rakkatakka vocals, wahwah solo guitar vocals (rhythm, lead on solos)
- Ross Thompson – higher rakkatakka vocals (lead)
- Ingo Sterzinger (Ike) – lowest dandan vocals (bass)
- Bastian Emig – drums, growled vocals on "Hearted"

Guest musicians

- Victor Smolski (Rage) – guitar solo on "One to Ten"
- Chris Boltendahl (Grave Digger) – vocals on "Rebellion"
- Orchestra on "Magic Taborea"
- Tony Kakko (Sonata Arctica) – vocals on "Hearted"
