= Orden Ogan =

German power metal band

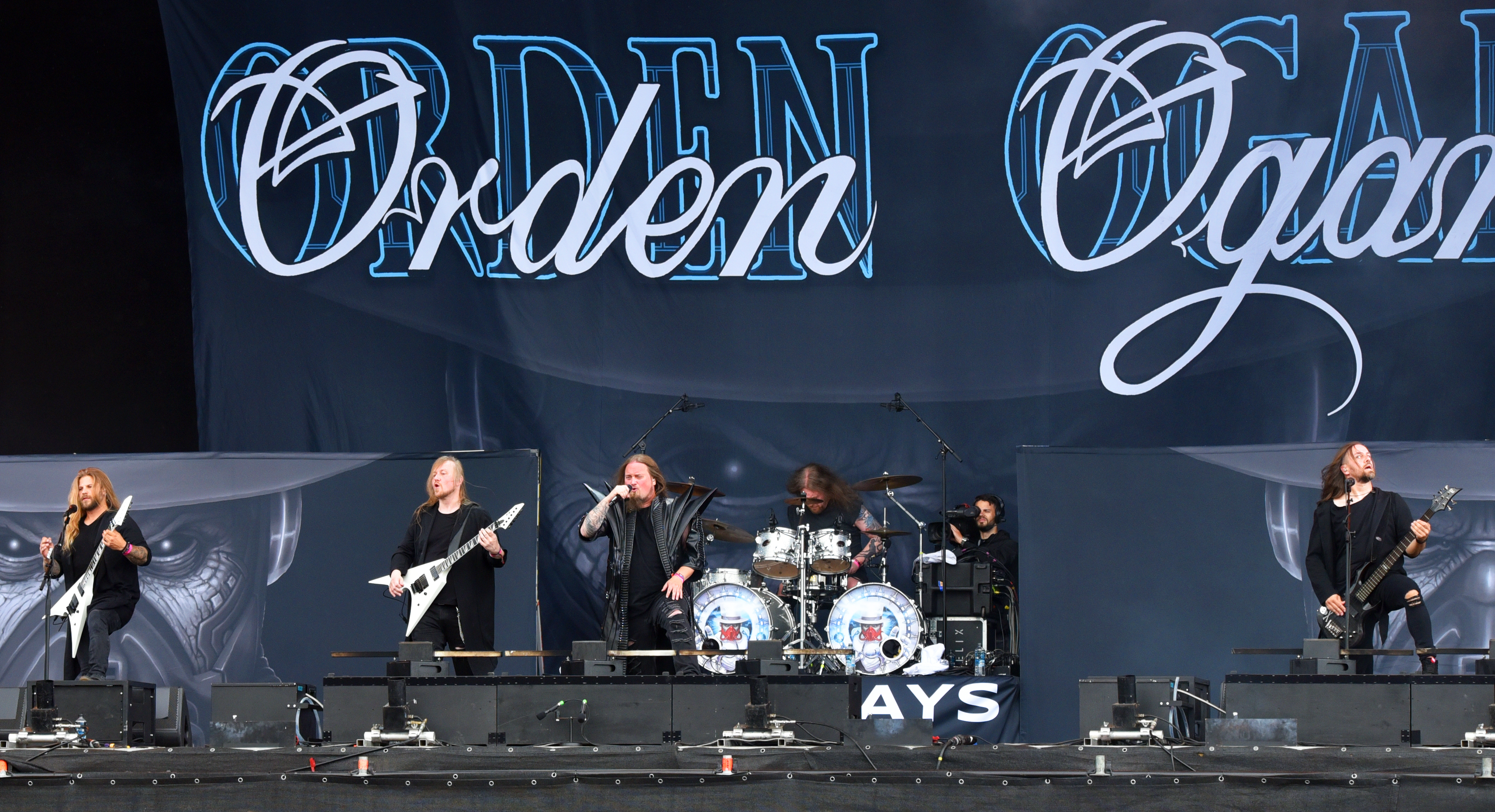
- Orden Ogan performing in 2022

Background information
- Also known as: Tanzende Aingewaide (1996–1997)
- Origin: Arnsberg, North Rhine-Westphalia, Germany
- Genres: Power metal, folk metal, heavy metal, progressive metal
- Years active: 1996–present
- Labels: Reigning Phoenix Music (RPM), AFM Records (2008-2024)
- Members: Sebastian "Seeb" Levermann; Niels Löffler; Dirk Meyer-Berhorn; Steven Wussow; Patrick Sperling
- Website: ordenogan.de
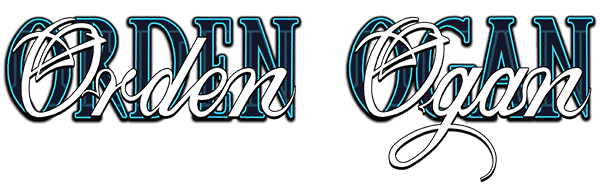

Orden Ogan is a German power metal band with folk metal elements. The band was formed in 1996 by Sebastian Grütling (drums) and Sebastian Levermann (lead vocals and guitar). They currently have three demos and seven studio albums and are signed with Reigning Phoenix Music. Prior to 2024, the band was signed with AFM Records. They also organize the German metal festival WinterNachtsTraum.

== History ==
Founded in June 1996 as Tanzende Aingewaide, the band was renamed Orden Ogan in 1997. Orden Ogan means "The Order of Fear," Orden being the German word for Order, and Ogan being the Old Celtic word for Fear. They released four demo tapes: Into Oblivion (1997), Anthem to the Darkside (1998), Soli Deo Gloria (1999), and Testimonium A.D. (2004).

The band considers its history to begin in 2008 with the release of their first studio album, Vale, which was released via Yonah Records in Germany, and met with acclaim by the European press. The German magazine, Rock Hard Magazine, called the band "the one and only legitimate Blind Guardian successor". Vale was later released in Brazil and Japan in 2009. Vale is also the first of the band's albums to feature their mascot Alister Vale. The cover art on all of the band's studio albums are done by Andreas Marschall, who has also done cover art for bands such as Blind Guardian. The band's songs may also include deeper meaning, but all studio albums include the loose concept of the story of their mascot Alister Vale, an immortal who is cursed and has to move on and on, but everything he leaves decays behind him. Orden Ogan participated in over 50 shows in 2008, with festivals such as Rock am Ring (Ger, Hi8 stage), Metal Healing in Greece, Germany's Rock Harz, and the Metal Camp in Slovenia.

In 2010, Orden Ogan released their second studio album, Easton Hope, with their current label AFM Records. Following the release, Orden Ogan did their first European tour supporting Tiamat.

Following a lineup change in 2011, Orden Ogan returned in 2012 album with their third studio album, To The End, which peaked at #41 on the German charts. The album's first single, The Things we Believe in, has reached over 5.8 million YouTube views as of 2021.

In 2013, it was announced that the band would play in the United States for the first time in 2014, participating in the power-progressive music festival, ProgPower USA XV. The band was also included in Wacken Open Air, Made of Metal Festival in the Czech Republic, and went on tour with Rhapsody and Freedom Call. They also toured Europe in January/February 2015 with Hammerfall and Serious Black.

In 2014, Orden Ogan frontman, Sebastian "Seeb" Levermann founded Greenman Studio, where he now mixes the audio for Orden Ogan. Greenman Studio has also mixed for the band Rhapsody of Fire.

In 2015, Orden Ogan released their fourth studio album, Ravenhead, which peaked at #16 on the German charts and #56 on the Swiss charts.

Orden Ogan released their fifth studio album, Gunmen, on 7 July 2017. On 19 May 2017, Orden Ogan posted the music video for their fifth album's first single, Gunman, to YouTube.

The band confirmed on 16 October 2019 that they had hired Steven Wussow (ex-Xandria) as the new bass player.

The band's sixth studio album Final Days, was announced on 6 December 2019 and was originally set to be released on 28 August 2020, but was later postponed to 12 March 2021 due to the COVID-19 pandemic. The first single off of the album, "In the Dawn of the AI", was released on 24 July 2020 along with a music video. The second single, "Heart of the Android", was released on 4 December 2020. The album was released in March, reaching number 3 on the German charts.

On 21 October 2022, the band released their seventh studio album Final Days (Orden Ogan and Friends). The album is a tribute to their previous album Final Days and features the same songs, but with guest vocalists from other bands. In addition to these songs, the album also features the song December, which was originally intended to be released with the original Final Days album. The subject matter for December regarded a killer virus that kills most of humanity, but was deemed to be too sensitive to include during the original release of Final Days due to the ongoing COVID-19 pandemic, and was therefore omitted from the original album out of respect for those affected. The new song was also released with a YouTube music video on AFM Records' YouTube channel.

In Orden Ogan's 2023 Spotify Wrapped Artist Message, Levermann announced to followers that a new album titled "The Order of Fear" would be released in 2024. On February 16, 2024, Reigning Phoenix Records announced the band's eighth studio album "The Order of Fear", to be released Summer 2024. Along with the announcement came the announcement of the first single of the album, "My Worst Enemy".

On 3 June 2026, the band announced that they will embark on a European tour with Ensiferum in January 2027, entitled the Tour of the Grave. They will also release their upcoming album, Lords of the Grave, on 8 January 2027, one day after their first show of the tour in Munich, Germany.

== Band members ==
=== Current ===
- Sebastian "Seeb" Levermann — vocals, keyboards (1996–present), guitar (1996–2019)
- Niels Löffler — bass (2011–2019), guitar (2019–present)
- Dirk Meyer-Berhorn — drums (2011–present)
- Steven Wussow — bass (2019–present)
- Patrick Sperling — guitar (2020–present)

=== Former ===
- Marc Peters — guitar (1998–2000)
- Stefan Manarin — guitar (2000–2006)
- Verena Melchert — flute (2001–2004)
- Christina Decker — keyboards (1996–2000)
- Sebastian Severin — bass (1996–2007)
- Sebastian "Ghnu" Grütling — drums (1996–2011)
- Lars Schneider — bass (2007–2011)
- Nils Weise — keyboards (2007–2011)
- Tobias Kersting — guitar (2007–2020)

== Discography ==
=== Studio albums ===
- Vale (2008)
- Easton Hope (2010)
- To the End (2012)
- Ravenhead (2015)
- Gunmen (2017)
- Final Days (2021)
- Final Days (Orden Ogan and Friends) (2022)
- The Order of Fear (2024)
- Lords of the Grave (2027)

=== Live albums ===
- The Book of Ogan (2016)

=== Singles / Music videos ===
- "We Are Pirates!" (2010)
- "The Things We Believe In" (2012)
- "Land of the Dead" (2012)
- "Fever" (2014)
- "Gunman" (2017)
- "Come with Me to the Other Side" (2017)
- "Fields of Sorrow" (2017)
- "In the Dawn of the AI" (2020)
- "Heart of the Android" (2020)
- "Inferno" (2021)
- "It Is Over" (2022)
- "Absolution For Our Final Days" (2022)
- "Inferno" (2022)
- "Interstellar" (2022)
- "December" (2022)
- "My Worst Enemy" (2024)
- "The Order of Fear" (2024)
- "Conquest" (2024)
