= Van Canto =

German a cappella metal band

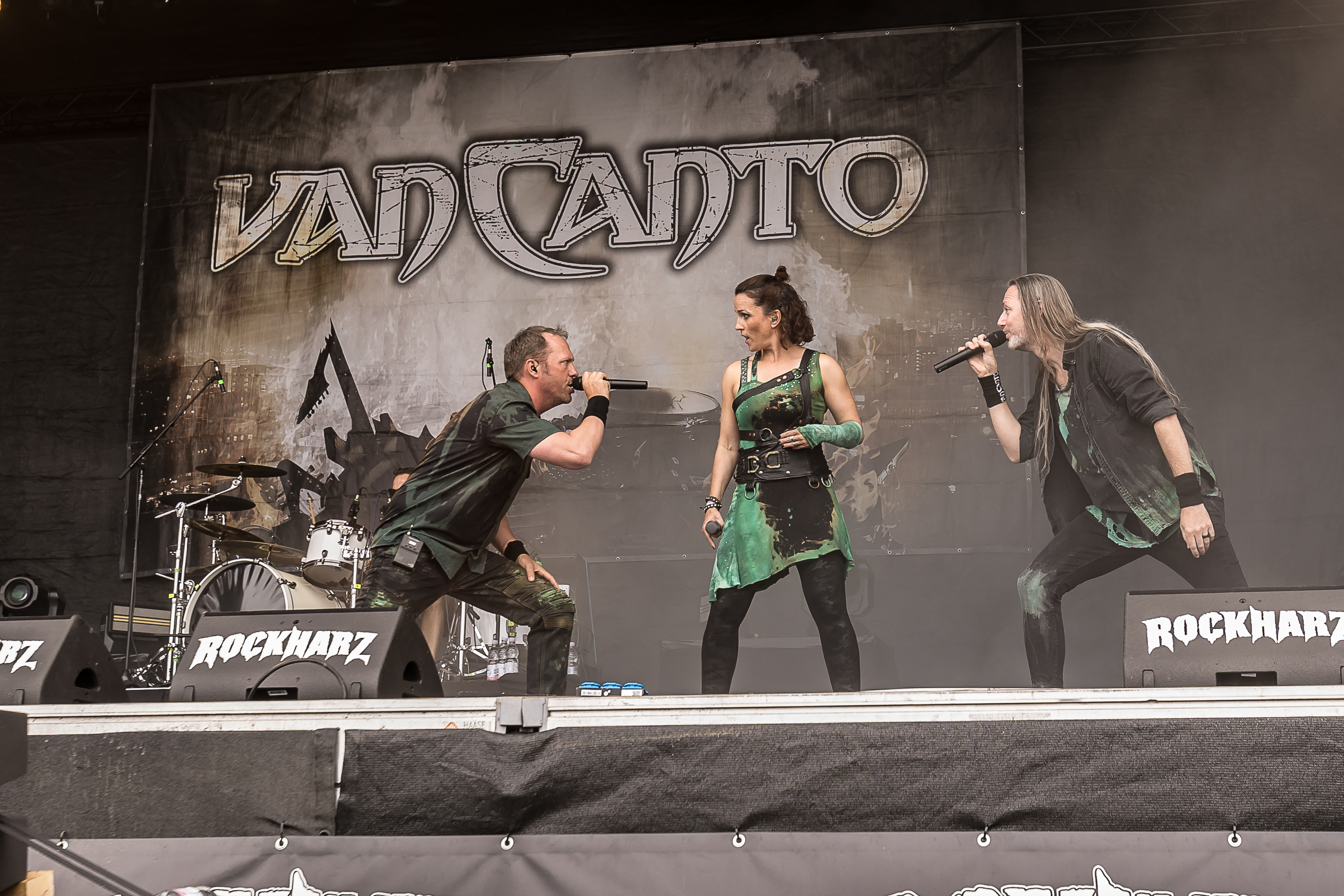
- Van Canto at Rockharz Open Air 2024

Background information
- Origin: Berlin, Germany
- Genres: A cappella; power metal
- Years active: 2006–present
- Labels: GUN / Sony BMG, Napalm
- Members: Inga Scharf; Stefan Schmidt; Ross Thompson; Jan Moritz; Ingo Sterzinger; Bastian Emig; Hagen Hirschmann
- Past members: Dennis Schunke; Dennis Strillinger
- Website: vancanto.de
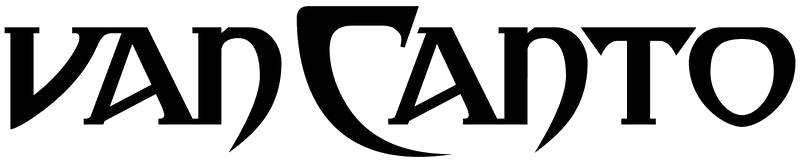

Van Canto (sometimes stylized as van Canto) is a German a cappella metal band, founded in 2006 and composed of six singers and a drummer. While only two of the singers perform the lead vocals, the other four use their voices to imitate the guitars and the bass, with the help of amplifiers, in an attempt to sound closer to the original instruments. They use real drums in their music, instead of vocal percussion or beatboxing.

Van Canto play a cappella with classic heavy, power and symphonic metal influence, creating what they call "hero metal a cappella".

== History ==
As soon as the band was founded, its debut album, A Storm to Come, was released through General Schallplatten. It features seven original tracks, as well as cover versions of Metallica's "Battery" and "Stora Rövardansen" from the movie Ronja Rövardotter. Additionally, videos were shot for the tracks "The Mission", "Battery", and "Rain". On 30 September 2007, they announced a new drummer, Bastian Emig, who replaced Dennis Strillinger's position in the band. In December 2007, Van Canto signed a worldwide record deal with Gun Records/Sony BMG. Also in December, the band were announced as part of the line up of the Wacken 2008 festival. The band also announced that their second album, titled "Hero", was in the progress of being recorded. Hero ended up being released on 26 September 2008, with producer Charlie Bauerfeind.

Van Canto performed a South American promotional tour between 23 June and 2 July 2008. The live performances took place primarily in Brazil, which is the homeland of Ingo Sterzinger. Soon after, the band arrived in Germany to perform live at Wacken 2008. A new song, "Speed of Light", was released as a digital single on 8 August 2008. A music video was shot for the song as well.

As of late 2009, Van Canto was recording their third studio album in Twilight Hall Studios, with Bauerfeind and via Napalm Records. The album was due to contain around 11 tracks, fewer covers than Hero and a couple of bonus tracks. It was released worldwide in early 2010, which happened alongside the worldwide release of their previous two albums. The album was announced at Nuclear Blast official website as Tribe of Force. The track listing features 13 tracks, two of them being covers ("Master of Puppets" by Metallica and "Rebellion" by Grave Digger), and three of them featuring guest artists: Victor Smolski (from Rage) guest appears in "One to Ten", Tony Kakko (from Sonata Arctica) guest appears on "Hearted" and Chris Boltendahl (from Grave Digger) guest appears in "Rebellion".

Van Canto performed guest vocals on albums by bands Blind Guardian and Grave Digger (At the Edge of Time and untitled, respectively). They also appeared on the Tarja Turunen album What Lies Beneath (on the track "Anteroom of Death").

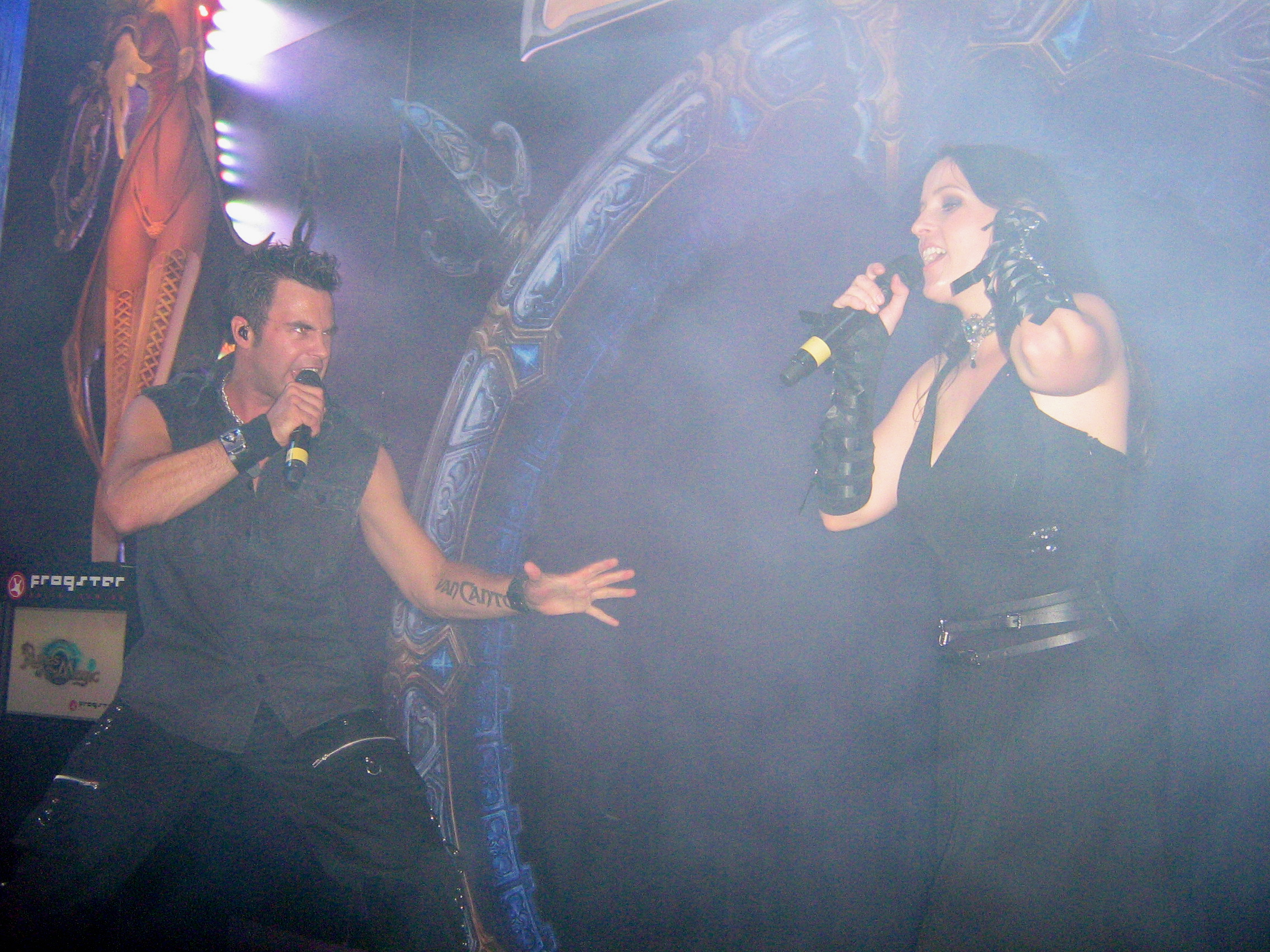
Van Canto performing in 2010

On 21 September 2010, it was announced that they had teamed up with the MMORPG Runes of Magic to create a music video based around the game for and with the game.

On 17 February 2011, it was announced on the official Van Canto website that the band was entering the studio and suspending touring until June in order to create a new album.

The band's fourth album Break the Silence was released on 22 September 2011.

Their fifth album, Dawn of the Brave, was released in February 2014. It contains nine own compositions and four cover versions: "Paranoid" by Black Sabbath, "The Final Countdown" by Europe, "Holding out for a Hero" by Bonnie Tyler, and "Into the West" by Annie Lennox from the soundtrack for the motion picture The Lord of the Rings: The Return of the King.

In November 2015, the band announced Ingo "Ike" Sterzinger would leave them to follow other projects, and that he would be replaced by Jan Moritz, from the Stimmgewalt choir. On 11 March 2016, the band released their sixth album, the metal opera Voices of Fire. On 18 January, they released a lyric video for the first track from the album, "Clashings on Armour Plates". On 18 February 2016, they released the official music video for "The Bardcall".

In August 2017, the band announced that Dennis "Sly" Schunke was leaving the band. On 18 August, it was announced that Ike would return to the band in the studio and at selected concerts and that a new singer Hagen Hirschmann, "Hagel", will perform the male lead vocals in the future.

In August 2018, the band released their seventh album, Trust in Rust.

In March 2021, the band released a trailer on YouTube through Napalm Records, stating that their newest album, To the Power of Eight, will be put out on 4 June of the same year, with Dennis "Sly" Schunke appearing as a guest lead vocalist on all tracks.

On August 13, 2026, the band released the official music video for their song "Stand" on YouTube.

On September 17, 2026, the band released the official music video for their newest song "Falling With the Night" on YouTube.

== Band members ==
Van Canto live at Rockharz 2019

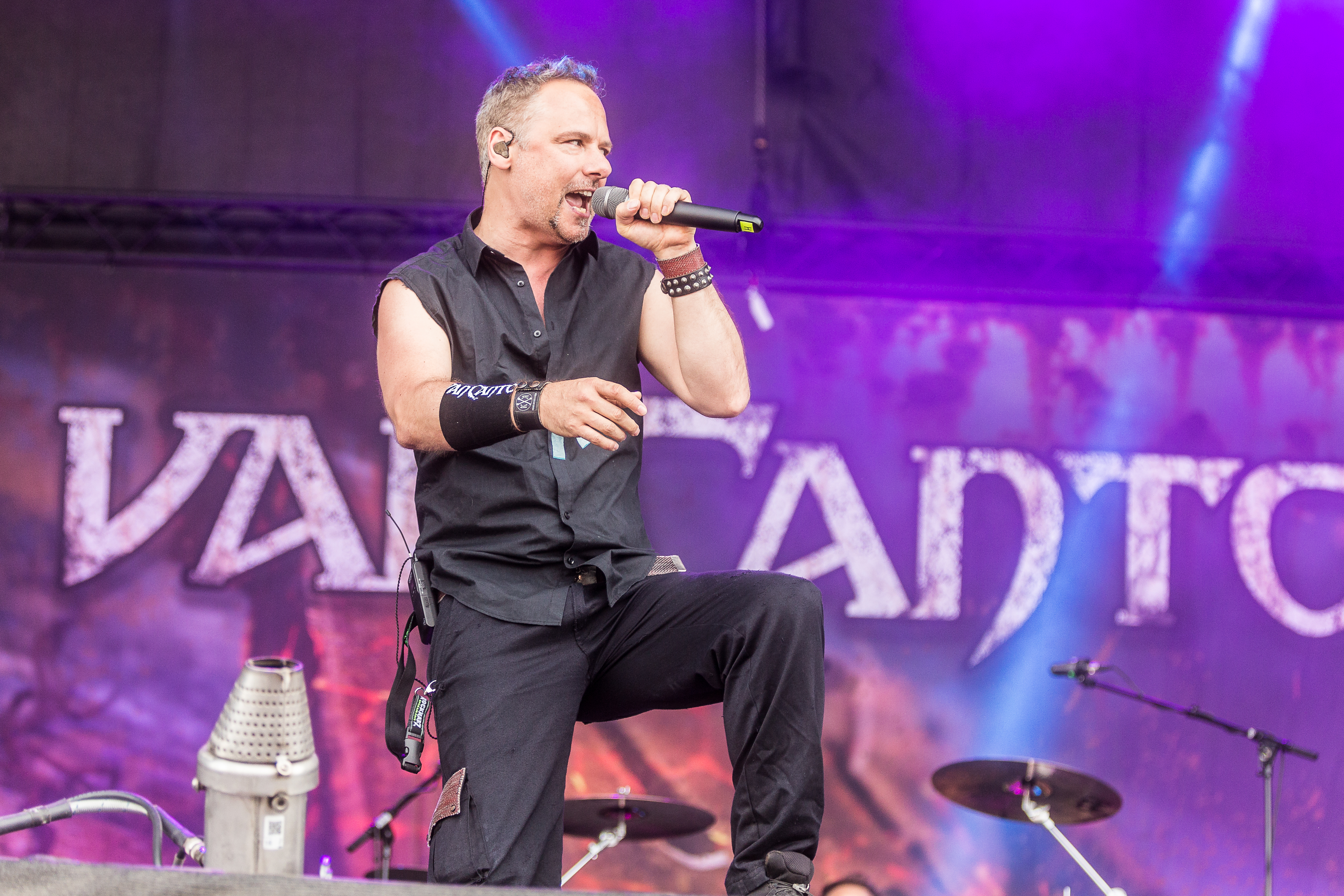
Hagen Hirschmann

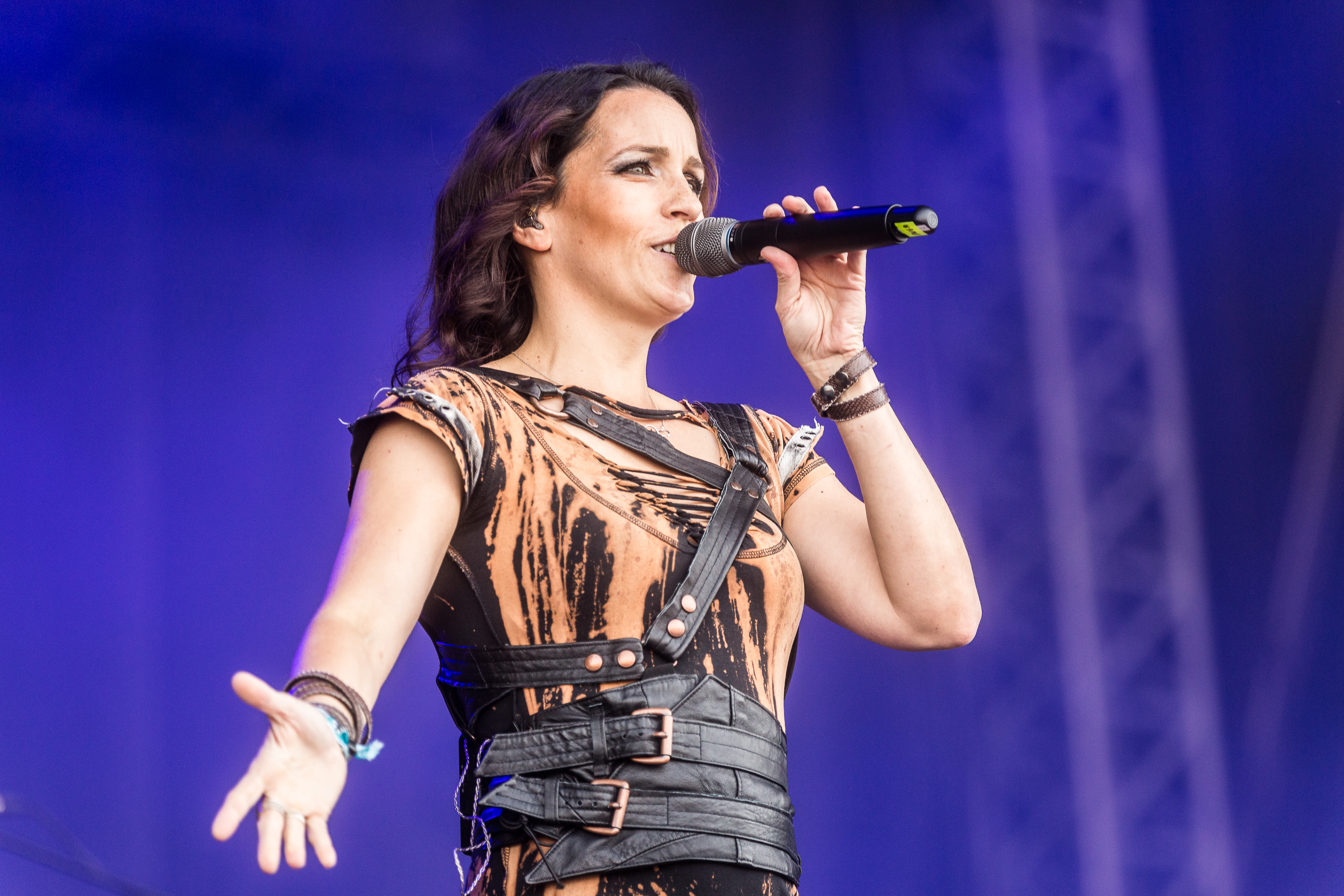
Inga Scharf

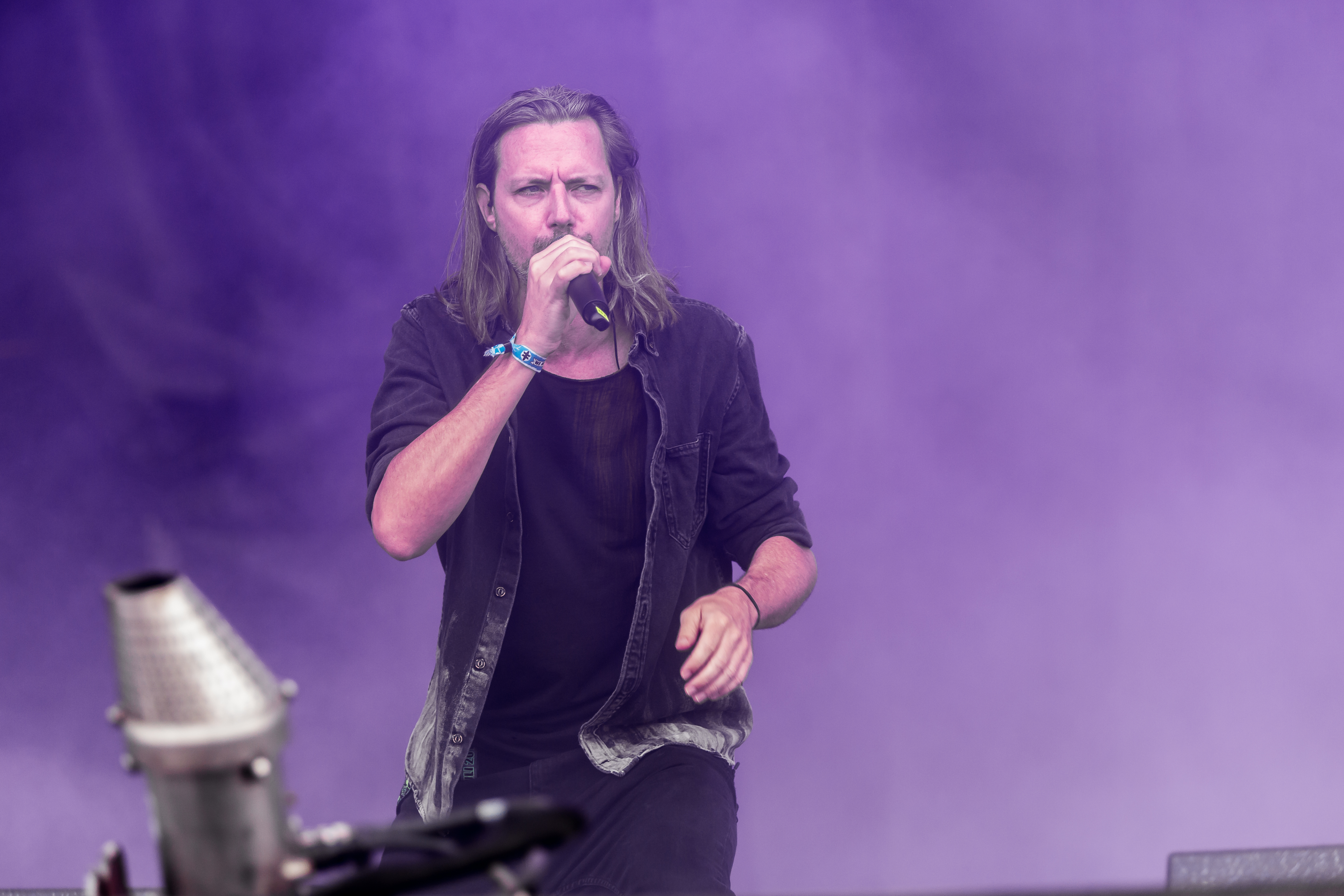
Ingo Sterzinger

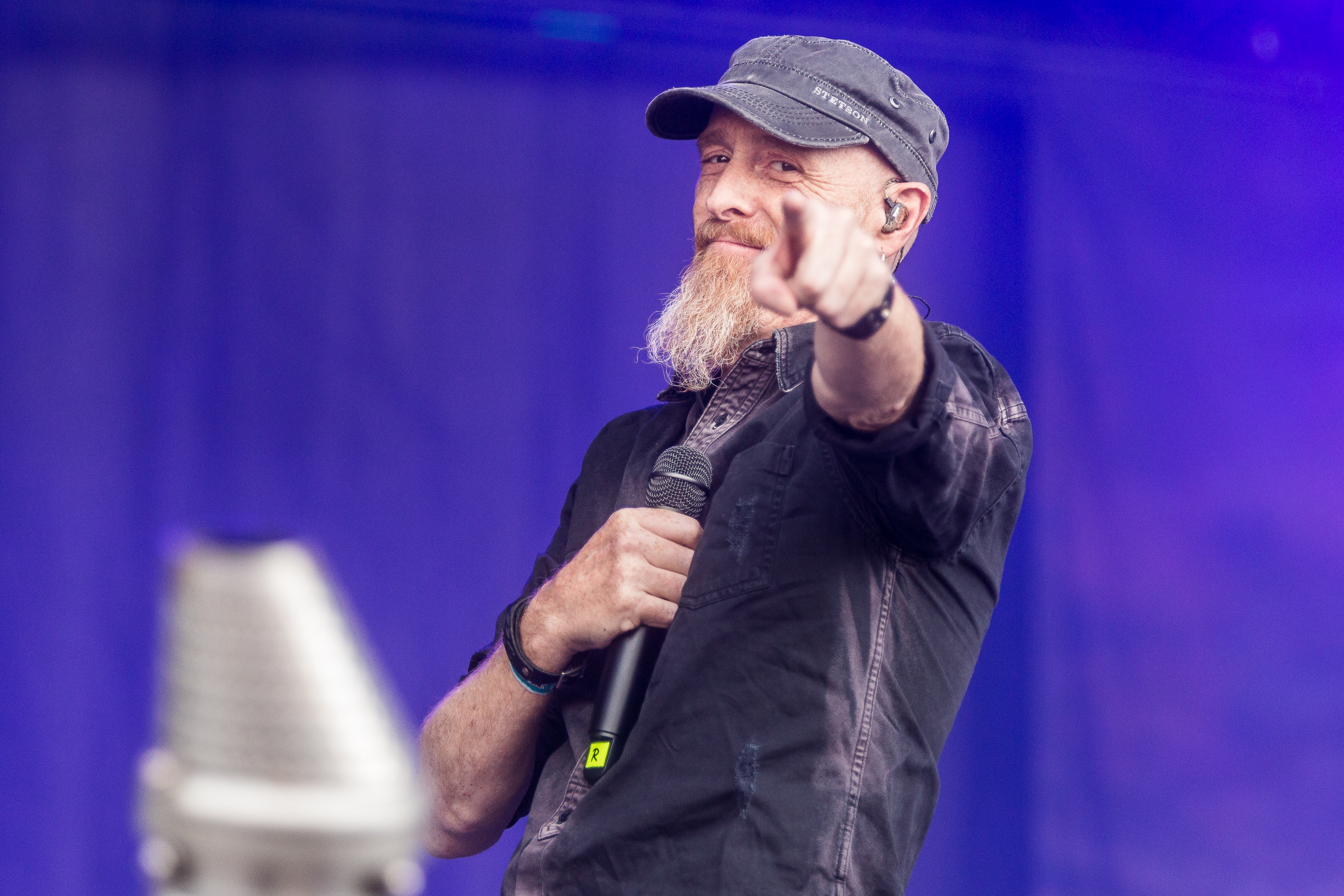
Ross Thompson

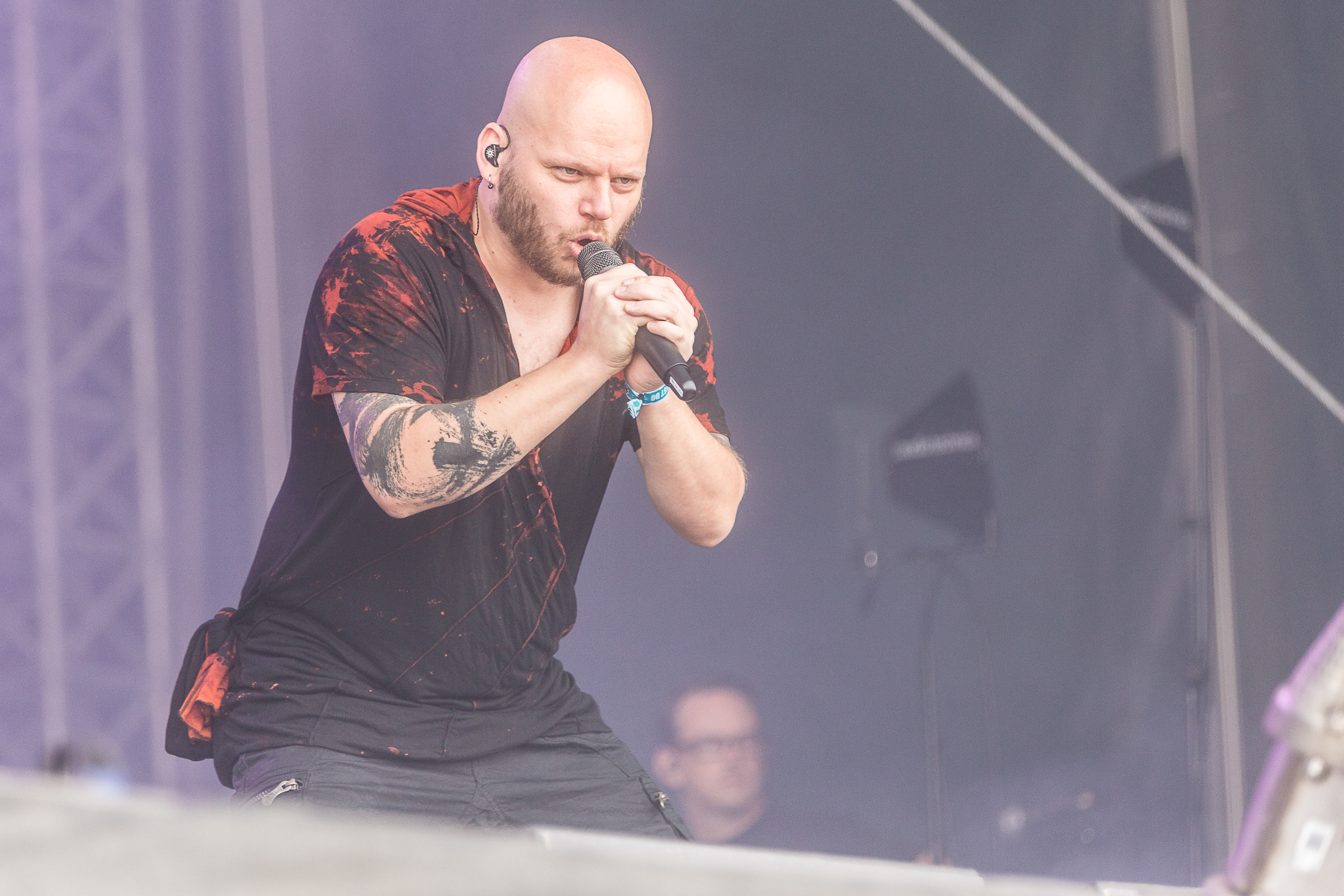
Jan Moritz

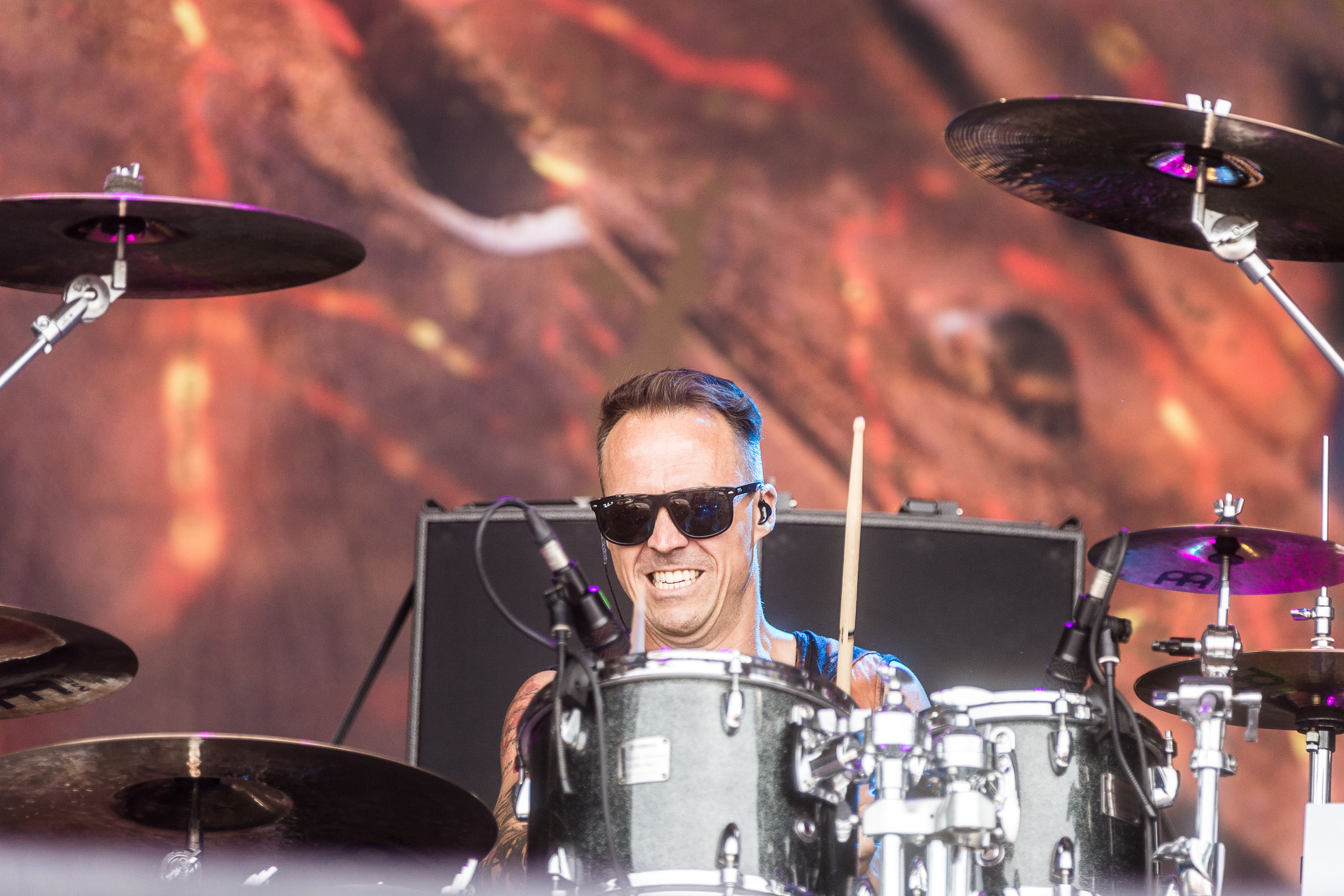
Bastian Emig

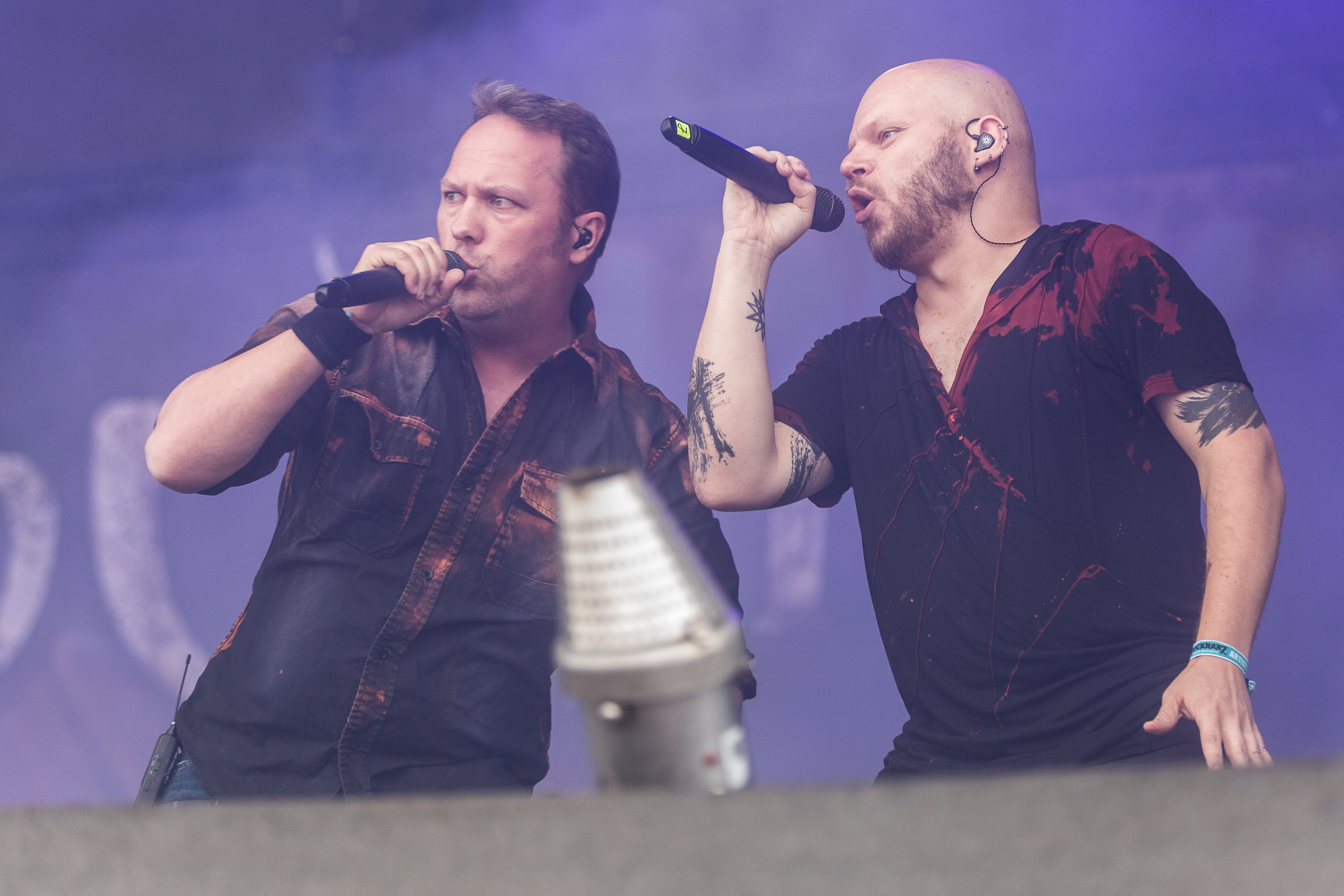
Stefan Schmidt (left)

=== Current ===
- Inga Scharf – female lead vocals (2006–present)
- Stefan Schmidt – lower guitar vocals, solo guitar vocals, vocals with distortion effects (2006–present)
- Ross Thompson – higher guitar vocals (2006–present)
- Ingo "Ike" Sterzinger – bass vocals (full time member: 2006–2015, studio and selected concerts: 2017–present)
- Bastian Emig – drums (2007–present)
- Jan Moritz – bass vocals (2015–present)
- Hagen "Hagel" Hirschmann – male lead vocals (2017–present)

=== Past ===
- Dennis "Sly" Schunke – male lead vocals (2006–2017), guest lead vocals (2021)
- Dennis Strillinger – drums (2006–2007)

== Discography ==
- A Storm to Come (2006)
- Hero (2008)
- Tribe of Force (2010)
- Break the Silence (2011)
- Dawn of the Brave (2014)
- Voices of Fire (2016)
- Trust in Rust (2018)
- To the Power of Eight (2021)

== See also ==
- Heavatar, founded in 2012 by Stefan Schmidt
- In Legend, founded in 2010 by Bastian Emig
