= Burning Sun =

Burning Sun may refer to:

- Burning Sun scandal
- Burning Sun (EP), by German power metal band Helloween (2012) or its title track
