= Helloween =

German power metal band

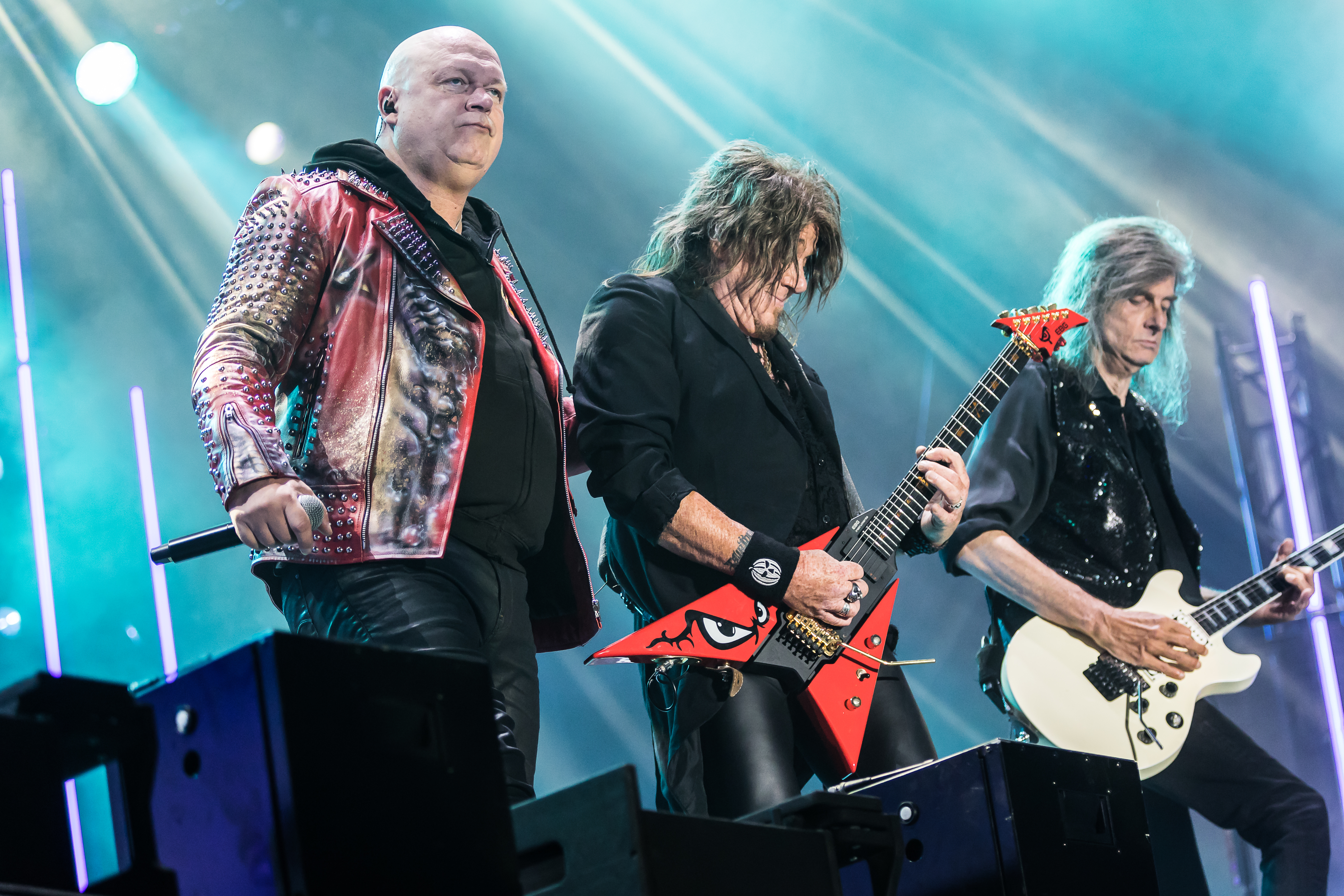
- Helloween at Rockharz 2026

Background information
- Origin: Hamburg, West Germany
- Genres: Power metal; speed metal (early)
- Works: Discography
- Years active: 1984–present
- Labels: Noise; RCA; EMI; Castle; Sony Music; Nuclear Blast; Steamhammer/SPV; Reigning Phoenix Music
- Spinoffs: Gamma Ray; Masterplan; Unisonic
- Members: Michael Weikath; Markus Grosskopf; Kai Hansen; Michael Kiske; Andi Deris; Sascha Gerstner; Daniel Löble
- Past members: See List of former Helloween members
- Website: helloween.org

Helloween is a German power metal band founded in 1984 in Hamburg by members of the bands Iron Fist, Gentry, Second Hell, and Powerfool. Helloween has at times been called one of the most influential European heavy metal bands of the 1980s.

Helloween's original line-up consisted of singer and guitarist Kai Hansen, bassist Markus Grosskopf, guitarist Michael Weikath and drummer Ingo Schwichtenberg. Its first line-up change took place in 1986, when Michael Kiske took over as lead vocalist. Hansen left in 1989 to form Gamma Ray and was replaced by Roland Grapow, and Schwichtenberg and Kiske had both parted ways in 1993, leaving Grosskopf and Weikath as the only two remaining original members. For the next 23 years, Helloween had undergone several more personnel changes that included vocalist Andi Deris (who replaced Kiske in 1994), guitarist Sascha Gerstner (who replaced Grapow in 2002) and drummers Uli Kusch, Mark Cross, Stefan Schwarzmann and Daniel Löble. The band settled on its current line-up in 2016, which features all of the surviving members of the Keeper of the Seven Keys line-up (Schwichtenberg had died in 1995), in addition to the remaining members from the Keeper of the Seven Keys: The Legacy-era (Deris, Gerstner and Loble).

Since its inception, Helloween has released 17 studio albums, five live albums, three EPs and 31 singles. The band was honored with 14 gold and six platinum awards and has sold more than 10 million records worldwide.

== History ==
=== Early years and first album (1984–1986) ===
Helloween was formed 1984 in Hamburg, West Germany. Its name was inspired by the film Halloween. The original line-up included Kai Hansen on vocals and guitar, Michael Weikath on guitar, Markus Grosskopf on bass and Ingo Schwichtenberg on drums. That year, the band signed with Noise Records and recorded two songs for a Noise compilation album called Death Metal. The compilation featured the bands Hellhammer, Running Wild and Dark Avenger. The two tracks were "Oernst of Life" by Weikath and Hansen's "Metal Invaders", a faster version of which would appear on the band's first full-length album.

Helloween recorded and released its first record in 1985, a self-titled EP containing five tracks. Also that year, the band released its first full-length album, Walls of Jericho, which helped spawn speed metal. During the following concert tour, Hansen had difficulties singing and playing the guitar at the same time. Hansen's last recording as the band's lead singer was in 1986 on a vinyl EP titled Judas, which contained the song "Judas" and live versions of "Ride the Sky" and "Guardians" recorded at Gelsenkirchen. (The CD edition has the live introduction, but the songs have been replaced with studio versions and crowd noise spliced in.) Following these releases, Helloween started the search for a new vocalist.

Hansen explained in an interview 1999:

We wanted to go for a lot more intricate stuff on the guitar and more technical. So it was like getting harder and harder for me without having big experience on vocals. I never had lessons or anything and I was not that fixed on the guitar yet so it was getting difficult. On the other hand we thought it would be really cool to have a real front man, a real singer. We heard Queensryche, the first album that they did, and we thought wow that would be cool to have a singer like that who could be very stable on the high soaring notes and have a lot of expression.

=== Keeper of the Seven Keys (1986–1989) ===
The band found an 18-year-old vocalist, Michael Kiske, from a local Hamburg band named Ill Prophecy. Kiske was initially uninterested in them, having heard the more thrashy Walls of Jericho, but after Weikath insisted, he attended one of their sessions and heard some songs they had composed for his voice (songs which would later be featured in their next albums), and he changed his mind.

With their new lead vocalist in tow, Helloween approached record labels Noise International and RCA and proposed the release of a double-LP to introduce the line-up. This proposition was turned down.

Instead, they recorded a single album, resulting in Keeper of the Seven Keys: Part I. The album was released by Noise Records in March 1987, months after the band spent the winter of 1986 into 1987 hard at work inside Horus Sound Studio in Hannover, Germany. It consisted of songs mostly written by Hansen. Due to guitarist Michael Weikath's illness, he was recovering from a nervous breakdown, all the rhythm guitars on the album were played by Hansen. Weikath was only able to play some guitar solos and only wrote the ballad "A Tale That Wasn't Right". Weikath said in an interview: "I was pleased to still be in the band."

The album received great reviews from the press and a great response from the fans. In addition, it made Helloween a benchmark to measure power metal bands. The positive reception took Helloween across the ocean, as they toured the US together with Grim Reaper and Armored Saint. Their American distributor at the time, RCA, got them to record a video for the epic "Halloween", but cut it to four minutes so that the video could be played on MTV. However, after the European tour together with then-unknown American thrash metal band Overkill, the first struggles within the band started taking shape.

Exhausted from touring, Hansen asked the band to take a short break from live performances. However, as the band was just starting to gain momentum the time to take a break was just not right. The disputes ranged from arguing about their musical direction on the future releases to extensive touring and other, mostly insignificant topics. Hansen started contemplating leaving the band.

In September 1988, Helloween released Keeper of the Seven Keys: Part II. This time the record featured more Weikath-penned tracks. The idea behind this was that the first album should feature tracks written by Hansen due to their similarity to the style of their debut, while the second album would feature tracks composed by Weikath which were a lot more mainstream by comparison. The album capitalized on the success of Keeper of the Seven Keys Part 1 and picks up where it left off. Success bloomed all over Europe, Asia and even the US. The album went gold in Germany, reached No. 108 in the US, hit the UK top 30 albums and single "Dr. Stein" reached No. 57.

Despite the vast commercial success of the Keeper's part two, the rift between the band members kept growing. They spent more time arguing about the music rather than composing it. Hansen called for a meeting and once again asked the band if they could take a break from touring.

The band got the chance to perform, in front of 100,000 people, as a part of the Monsters of Rock festival along with Iron Maiden, David Lee Roth, Kiss, Megadeth and Guns N' Roses at Donington Park on 20 August 1988.

Around the same time, the tension between the band and their record label Noise led to an argument which would later lead to a lawsuit. The band was discontent with how much they were being paid taking into account great record and merchandise sales, as well as frequent touring. Helloween also supported Iron Maiden on their Seventh Tour of a Seventh Tour, on some dates in Europe.

In the fall of 1988, the band went on yet another European tour, now as headlining act, named "Pumpkins Fly Free Tour", which spawned their first ever live album, released the year after, titled Live in the U.K. recorded during their show in Scotland. The same record was also released as Keepers Live in Japan and I Want Out Live in the US.

MTV put the single "I Want Out" into heavy rotation. A video that was directed by Storm Thorgerson. For "I Want Out", Hansen very publicly laid out his disillusion with life as a member of Helloween at this time, explaining:

It was a statement, yeah. It wasn't just wanting out of the band, it was a general thing relating to everything that was going on: poor management, other people telling us where to be and what to do, never-ending internal discussions… I just wanted to rock.

In support of its Headbangers Ball show, MTV also presented the Headbangers Ball Tour in U.S. and invited Helloween to be a part of it in 1989. However, before the start of that tour, in December 1988 Kai Hansen broke the news to the other members that he was leaving Helloween. Hansen's last show with the band was at The Hummingbird, Birmingham, UK on 8 November 1988.

=== Hansen, Schwichtenberg and Kiske's departures (1989–1993) ===
Hansen officially left Helloween on 1 January 1989, and the band chose Roland Grapow to replace him. Grapow was originally discovered in a club in Hamburg, Germany playing with his band Rampage. Helloween guitarist Michael Weikath kept Grapow's name in mind in the event Hansen would potentially leave.

Grapow, who was a car mechanic at the time, stated in 2017 that, if Weikath had not happened to ask him to join the band, he would have kept his job and given up on his dream of becoming a professional musician. Grapow said in 2020:

Weikath called me in August '88 with the question if I was still playing guitar, because he saw me at a Rampage show. He asked me if I'd like to join Helloween after they will finish the European tour, because Kai wanted to leave the band…so I started learning the songs and in December I was playing five songs with them at the rehearsal room. Some weeks later I was already on tour in America with them and then we went to Japan after that.

The inaugural Headbangers Ball Tour started in April 1989 with Helloween joining San Francisco Bay Area thrash metal band Exodus in support of headlining act Anthrax. The band was slotted in the prestigious second spot, right before Anthrax's set. On the heels of this exposure to U.S. audiences, the band achieved worldwide success. Kiske reflected at the time:

I can see why it made sense for us to get involved with MTV but I really don't think we fit this bill at all. We're playing our hardest songs every night, but we're not thrash.

At the height of their success Helloween decided to sign with then-major label EMI Records after being urged to do so by their management company Sanctuary, who also managed Iron Maiden. Their former label Noise Records sued them for breach of contract which effectively put the band on hold. Between June 1989 and April 1992 they did not play one show. All the momentum the band had built up came to a halt.

Their first album with new guitarist Grapow Pink Bubbles Go Ape was released on EMI in the spring of 1991 in Europe and Japan. In the rest of the world as well as the band's home country Germany the album was delayed until April 1992 due to the ongoing legal battle between the band's current and former labels. By that time the music landscape had changed drastically. It also did not help that Helloween moved even further away from their speed metal roots and further embrace the hard rocking side of their sound. As a result, Pink Bubbles Go Ape failed commercially and tensions started to build amongst the band members.

They played their first show on their "Quick Hello Tour" in Hamburg 30 April 1992 and continued with some more dates in Europe and the band also went to Japan in the autumn of 1992.

The follow-up Chameleon was released on EMI in the summer of 1993. The very experimental album was a commercial failure. The band's diversion away from the sound that had made them famous alienated a large portion of their fanbase.

Original Helloween drummer Ingo Schwichtenberg was then fired from the band due to his deteriorating mental state.

We started to notice something was wrong with him when we were on tour, with all that road pressure. Ingo had a strange behavior... he did strange things and we noticed something was seriously wrong with him. We lived with him and we could see his changes.

Grosskopf said 1996:

It was like he had two people in his mind: the good and the evil. He told me the evil was always talking to him. It was very strong in him, he was very depressed. We decided to give him professional help, 'cause we could not help him. It was too serious.

Schwichtenberg could not be part of the band anymore until he recovered from drugs and alcohol abuse and took his medications against schizophrenia. After a long telephone call with Weikath, in which he explained why they had made that hard and painful decision, Schwichtenberg was asked to leave Helloween.

He was replaced by session drummer Ritchie Abdel-Nabi on a temporary basis to finish the Chameleon Tour. Also many of the European dates were cancelled. Helloween played in half-filled venues and their decision to focus the setlist mostly on Chameleon and Pink Bubbles songs did not help either.

Weikath said 1994 about Kiske and the Chameleon Tour:

During that tour we played seven concerts and cancelled the rest. Kiske said he had a throat illness, but we all thought it was panic. Your voice disappears when you are frightened or on panic. It looked like he just stayed static on stage, and when I said to him to move and give a better impression to the audience, he said that I was diminishing his authority on stage. I didn't find that fun, because he did his acts on stage, and they weren't spontaneous like before, he was just standing still to sing better, and that showed us that the songs from "Chameleon" weren't good for shows. I understand, the album could be interesting, but on the eyes of the fans we weren't able to play it live. It was like rice for us: Sticky, but not tasty!

Meanwhile, the conflicts within the rest of the band worsened and the decision was made to fire Kiske. His last performance with the band was at a Charity show at Rockfabrik Ludwigsburg 22 December 1993, until he returned to the stage with Helloween 24 years later.

Kiske did not have any contact with Grosskopf and Weikath for many years. He would later release solo albums with different musical directions. In 2008, Kiske released Past in Different Ways; an album featuring most of his old Helloween songs, albeit rearranged and re-recorded acoustically. Commenting on Kiske's dismissal, Grosskopf later said:

People thought we were crazy for firing a singer like Kiske, but then after all those years and listening to what he's doing now I hope people will understand why we did that decision. Otherwise he would have pushed us into the direction where he is going now and we didn't want that.

1993 would come to a close for Helloween with no singer, no drummer, and no record contract (EMI released the band from its agreement for the low sales numbers for Pink Bubbles Go Ape and Chameleon).

Weikath said 1994:

Well, EMI said we didn't sell enough records for their taste. They had to pay a lot of pre-production costs and sadly we weren't able to sell enough albums for them to have their money back. The fans were disappointed. First with "Pink Bubbles Go Ape", and now with "Chameleon". We still sold 400.000 copies of "Chameleon", but we made a deal with EMI and changed our label.

Grosskopf continued:

That was a time when nobody understood each other. There was too much arguing. Someone wanted it this way, the other wanted that way. We didn't have anything to lose. The three of us sat down and decided to begin again.

=== First years with Andi Deris and return to the roots (1994–2000) ===
Helloween returned in 1994 with former Pink Cream 69 frontman Andi Deris as their new lead vocalist and Uli Kusch, formerly of Kai Hansen's Gamma Ray, on drums. The band already knew Deris from some recording sessions in Hamburg, though both Deris and new drummer Uli Kusch played on the band's next album Master of the Rings, which was released on 8 July 1994, they were temporary members of the band back during the recording sessions, but they eventually became permanent members of the band on 1 September 1994. Deris had been approached by Weikath to join the band in 1991, but he had declined, despite being intrigued by the offer and having to deal with emerging conflicts between him and his band. In the years since, however, Kiske was fired from Helloween and the issues within Pink Cream 69 worsened. Faced with the inevitability of his firing, Deris accepted Weikath's offer during a night out with the band members. With this new lineup and a new record contract with Castle Communications, Helloween released its comeback album, Master of the Rings.

8 March 1995, original drummer Ingo Schwichtenberg committed suicide by jumping in front of a train in his native Hamburg. In the years since his departure from Helloween, Schwichtenberg had gotten worse from schizophrenia. 1996's The Time of the Oath was dedicated to his memory.

Following another world tour, a double live album called High Live was released. In 1998, Helloween released Better Than Raw, one of the band's heaviest albums since the full-length debut. The subsequent supporting tour was made up of stops in Europe, Japan and Brazil, but on 20 December 1998, the band visited New York and played a show at the venue Coney Island High in Manhattan, the first show for Helloween in the United States in nearly a decade.

The band would follow Better Than Raw with a 1999 release titled Metal Jukebox, a cover-album featuring Helloween's versions of songs from such bands as Scorpions, Jethro Tull, Faith No More, The Beatles, ABBA and Deep Purple.

=== Line-up changes (2002–2004) ===
2000 saw the release of The Dark Ride, a more experimental and darker album than their previous releases. It came complete with downtuned guitars and a gruffer singing style from Deris. Immediately following the tour, Helloween parted ways with guitarist Roland Grapow and drummer Uli Kusch. One version of events states that Weikath, Deris and Grosskopf felt that Kusch and Grapow, in particular, were spending more time on and paying more attention to their new side-project, Masterplan (Grapow's output on Helloween albums had dropped to barely one song per album by that point); since the others believed that Kusch and Grapow were not one hundred percent dedicated to Helloween, they were dismissed.

They were replaced by guitarist Sascha Gerstner (ex-Freedom Call, Neumond) and drummer Mark Cross (ex-Metalium, Kingdom Come, At Vance, Firewind), culminating with the recording of another studio album, titled Rabbit Don't Come Easy, in 2003. Despite the lineup difficulties the band apparently managed to perform at Wacken Open Air in 2001. The band met Gerstner via a recommendation by producer Charlie Bauerfeind. According to Grosskopf, one day he was recording something with Freedom Call "and later on we called him up and he went to first meet Weiki because it was very important that Weiki finds a player that he can play with and also communicate and understand. [...] So we got him on the island where we recorded and let him hang out with us a little and then he decided 'Good, let's go'." Later in 2012, on an interview with Metal Shock Finland's Chief Editor, Mohsen Fayyazi, Grapow stated:

I felt very secure in Helloween. In the middle of the tour I said something to Michael and Markus and I said my opinion about something. I wanted to make something the best for the band and I think they misunderstood me, like I wanted to be leader. I was telling the truth and that's how I am... It was a great time in Helloween... but I am happy when I left the band after Dark Ride because it's one of my favourite albums, it changed my life totally.

Cross could not finish the album due to mononucleosis, completing only two tracks; the drum tracks were completed by Motörhead's Mikkey Dee. Stefan Schwarzmann, former drummer of Running Wild and Accept would shortly thereafter take over the drumming duties. Despite a somewhat tepid response to the album, Helloween nonetheless completed a successful world tour, highlighted by the return of classic songs such as "Starlight", "Murderer", and "Keeper of the Seven Keys" to the setlist. Additionally, the band toured the United States for the first time since 1989, playing to sold-out crowds at nearly every venue.

=== Steady line-up (2005–2016) ===
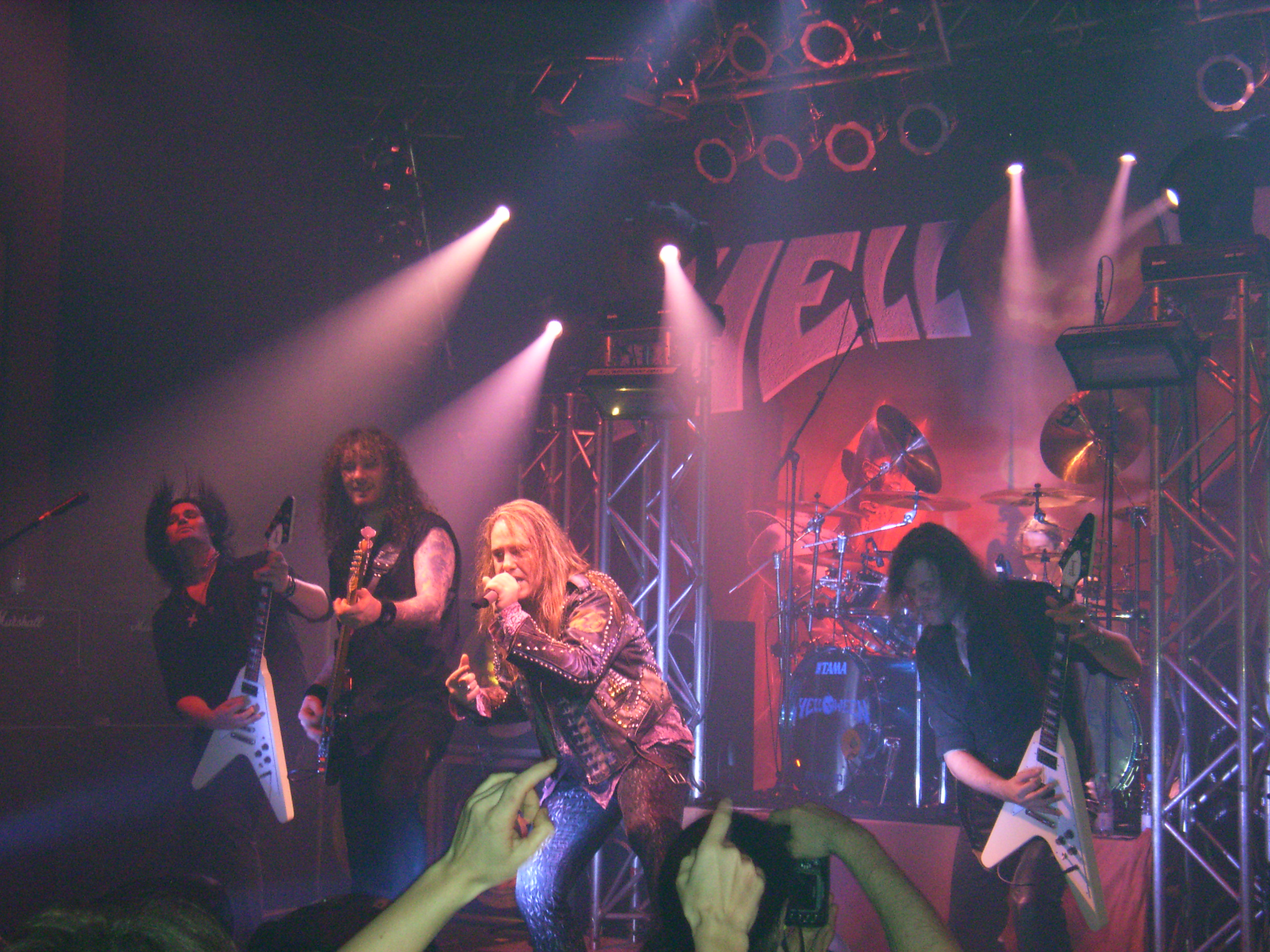
Helloween in 2006

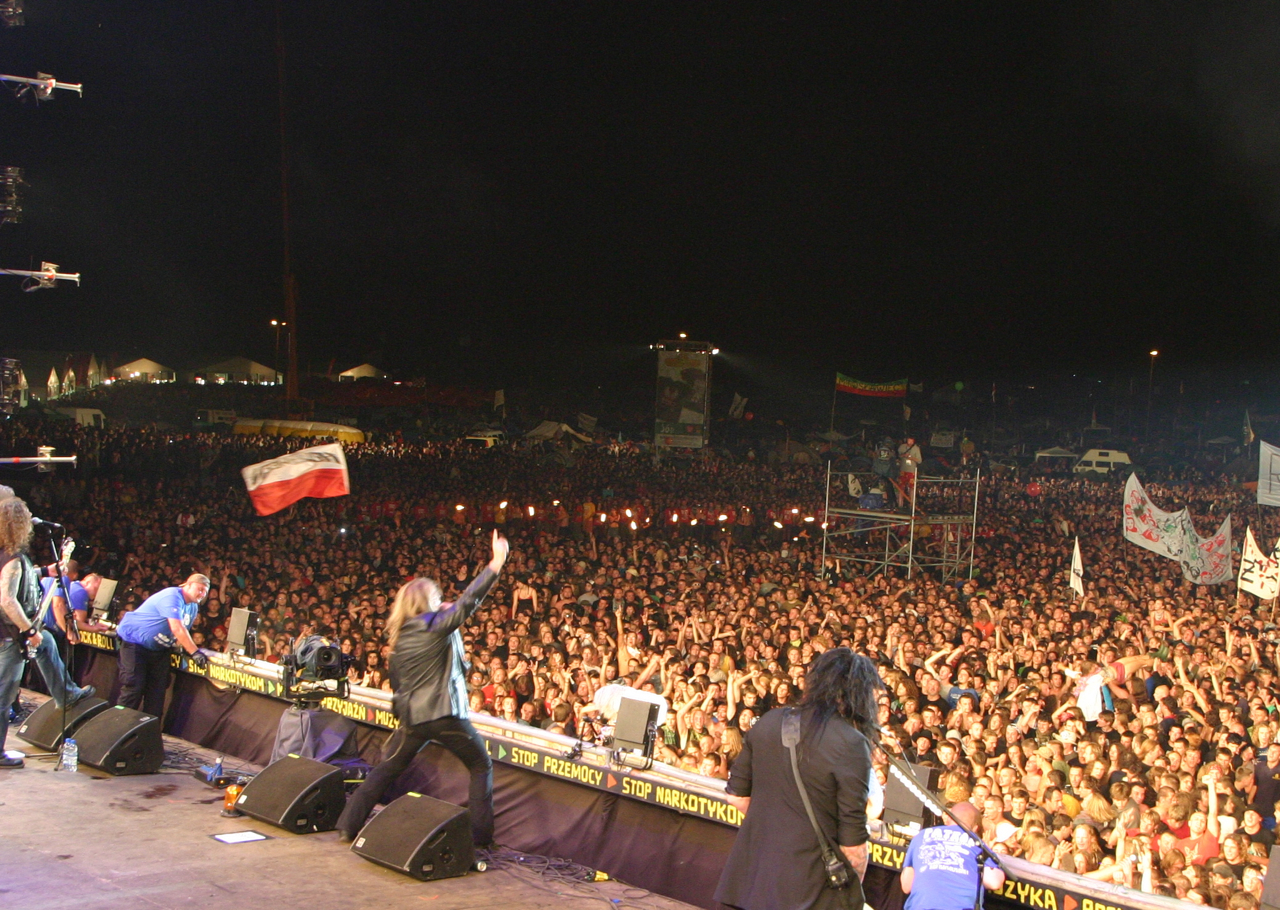
Helloween at Przystanek Woodstock in 2011

2005 saw yet another line-up change, following the "Rabbits on the Run" tour, as it became apparent that Helloween and Stefan Schwarzmann did not share the same musical vision. As further noted by the band, he had some trouble performing fast drum parts, so he was replaced by Daniel Löble, the former drummer of German metal band Rawhead Rexx. A change in record company also followed as they signed a deal with German label SPV. Any fears that what had now become a revolving door of band members would affect the quality of their new album were laid to rest as Helloween's new studio album, titled Keeper of the Seven Keys – The Legacy, was released on 28 October 2005 in Germany and 8 November in the US to commercial and critical acclaim. The album had a pre-release single, "Mrs. God", as well as a video for the track. The track "Light the Universe" was released as a single on 22 November, featuring Candice Night of Blackmore's Night on guest vocals. She also appears in the video clip for that track.

In late 2006, Helloween filmed and recorded shows in São Paulo (Brazil), Sofia (Bulgaria) and Tokyo (Japan) for their live album Keeper of the Seven Keys – The Legacy World Tour 2005/2006. The DVD also featured extra footage of the band, as well as interviews and a road movie. This was the second Helloween live album to feature Andi Deris as frontman and third overall. It enjoyed chart success in several countries: Germany: 9 (DVD) & 58 (CD), Sweden: 9 (DVD), France: 10 (DVD) Helloween has since completed their studio album Gambling with the Devil, which was released on 23 October 2007. It received many positive reviews, with most fans praising the album as being one of the best Deris-era albums. Despite being one of Helloween's heaviest albums, it is noted for featuring more keyboards. "As Long as I Fall", the first single, was released in early September and only available via download (save for Japan, where it was released on CD). The video for the song is available at their official site.

Helloween teamed up with Kai Hansen's current band Gamma Ray for their 2007–2008 "Hellish Rock" world tour, which started in early November 2007. Helloween were headlining and Gamma Ray were labeled as the "very special guest" with most shows also having fellow German "guest" Axxis. The tour went through Europe, Asia and South America, as well as a few dates in the US. The tour is notable for Kai Hansen stepping on stage with his former band fellows Weikath and Grosskopf to perform hits "I Want Out" and "Future World" in the last encore segment of Helloween. In 2008, they played the UK Bloodstock festival alongside Dimmu Borgir.

On 26 December 2009, Helloween released the Unarmed – Best of 25th Anniversary album in Japan. The album was released on 1 February 2010 in Europe. The album is a compilation of ten of the band's best known songs, re-recorded in different musical styles than the original recordings and by the current lineup. It features a seventeen-minute "Keepers Medley", recorded by a seventy-piece orchestra from Prague, mixing together "Halloween", "The Keeper of the Seven Keys" and "The King for a 1000 Years". There is a limited edition digipak, including a thirty-minute "making of"-DVD with interviews and studio footage. The band's website states that the album was released on 13 April 2010 in North America via The End Records. On 14 May 2010, it was announced on their site that they were working on a new studio album, which was the fastest and heaviest effort in years.

Helloween released their thirteenth studio album, 7 Sinners, on 31 October 2010 in Europe and 3 November 2010 in the US. Before its physical release, the band made it available worldwide for streaming via their Myspace page. The name of the album alludes to the seven deadly sins. According to Andi Deris, the album goes straight to the point: "After an acoustic album, we needed definitely something that shows the people without any question that this is a metal album." The band toured to promote the new album with Stratovarius and Pink Cream 69 as their guests. On 5 April 2011, via the band's website, it was announced that 7 Sinners was awarded 'Gold status' in the Czech Republic.

In June 2012, Helloween entered the studio to begin recording their fourteenth album, Straight Out of Hell, which was released on 18 January 2013. They then went on tour around the world with Gamma Ray again.

In September, Helloween played at Rock in Rio 2013 with former member Kai Hansen as a special guest. In October 2014, the band announced a new album for a May 2015 release. It was produced by Charlie Bauerfeind at Mi Sueño Studio on Tenerife and marked their return to the Nuclear Blast label with which they released The Dark Ride and Rabbit Don't Come Easy.

On 26 February 2015, the band revealed the name and the cover artwork of the album, My God-Given Right, released on 29 May 2015. The artwork was created by Martin Häusler. In June 2015, it was discovered that the band members were working on a book, released as "Hellbook". Grosskopf stated that it is "a kind of history book with lots of pictures".

=== Pumpkins United (2016–present) ===
In November 2016, it was announced that former members Kai Hansen and Michael Kiske were re-joining the band for a world tour titled the Pumpkins United World Tour, that would start on 19 October 2017 in Monterrey, Mexico, and conclude the following year.

Kai said something like, "Michael, if we don't ever do anything again under the name of Helloween, we're just idiots." [...] and I just said, "You know what, Kai? I'm open".

— Michael Kiske in 2017, on when Kai Hansen convinced him to perform with Helloween again.

Although Hansen had been occasionally appearing as a guest on Helloween shows for a few years, Kiske had been particularly reluctant in interviews to the idea of performing with Helloween again due to bad blood with Markus Grosskopf and especially Michael Weikath, dating from when he was fired from the band in 1993; this started to change in 2013, when he ran into Weikath at the Sweden Rock Festival. He stated in 2017: "The first thing [Weikath] said was, 'What have I done that you can't forgive me?' That was the first line he said to me. And I realized that I had forgiven somehow a long time ago without noticing. That's how it all started". It was Hansen, who had been his bandmate as a part of Unisonic since 2011, who ultimately convinced him in 2014. Other popular former members Roland Grapow and Uli Kusch were not asked to re-join, with Grosskopf stating "it would be too many people".

This new line-up released an original song, "Pumpkins United", on 13 October 2017, as a free download (with a vinyl release on 8 December), on which Deris, Hansen and Kiske all share lead vocals. The Pumpkins United World Tour started in Monterrey, Mexico on 19 October 2017. The first show saw both Deris and Kiske performing songs from their respective Helloween albums and sing duets together, while Hansen performed lead vocals for a medley of songs from Walls of Jericho. The show also included a tribute to the late original Helloween drummer Ingo Schwichtenberg.

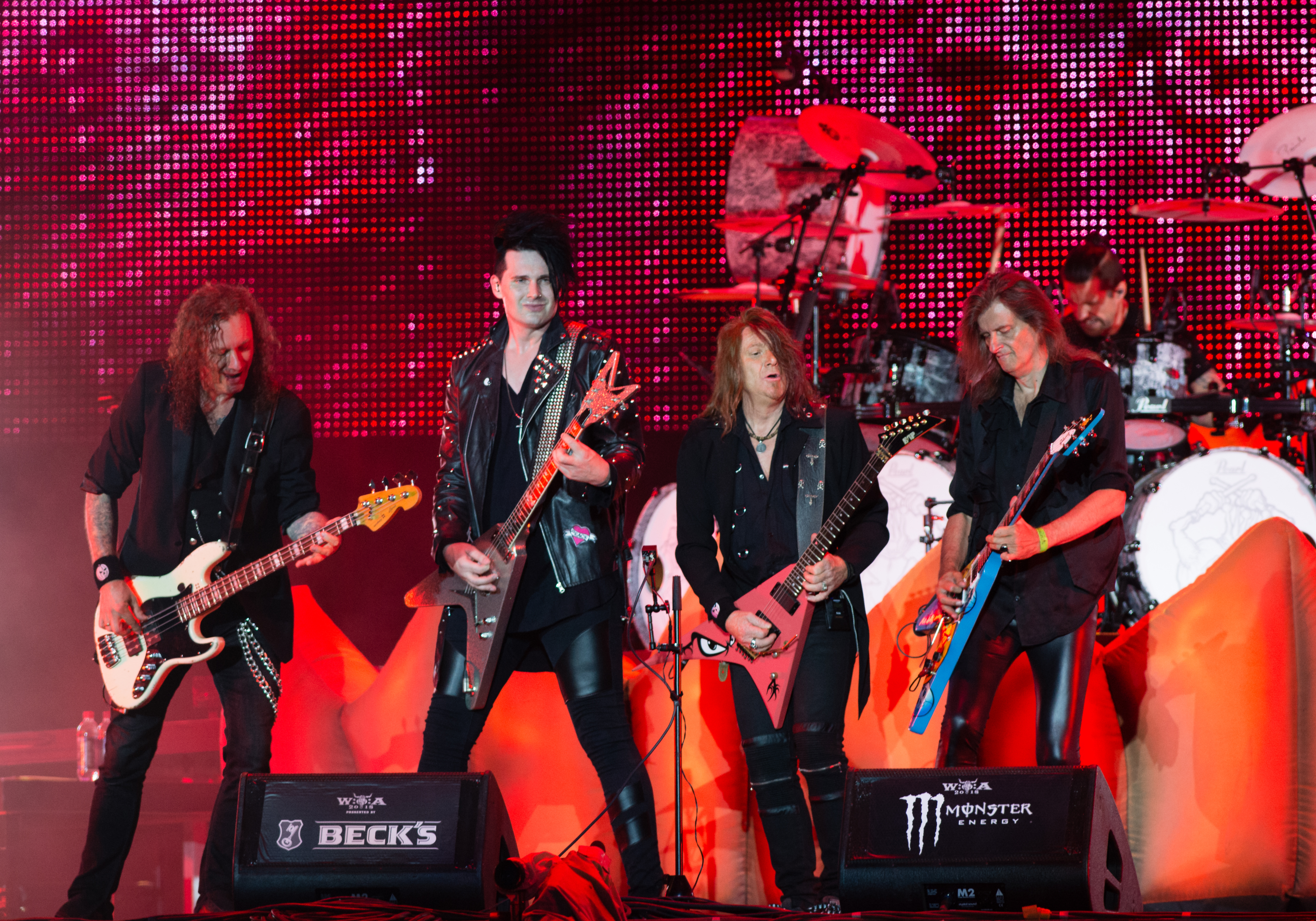
Helloween performing at Wacken Open Air 2018. From left to right: Markus Grosskopf, Sascha Gerstner, Kai Hansen, Michael Weikath and Daniel Löble.

However, Kiske started suffering health issues related to his voice shortly before starting the tour, to the point where after the first two shows in Mexico, his involvement for the next dates was unsure. He was cleared to perform by doctors in time for the next show in San José, Costa Rica on 23 October, although his illness forced the band to temporally remove a few songs from their setlist, and to have Deris, Hansen and Gerstner support him more vocally. After accusations from fans of Kiske using lip sync on the more vocally demanding parts of some songs, Kai Hansen confirmed that Kiske had indeed partially used taped vocals, but only for the tour's opening show in Monterrey, and because the band feared they would have to cancel the show, as Kiske felt unsure he would be able to perform at all due to his illness. Kiske stated in 2021 that "it was the hardest tour that I ever did because I caught a freakin' virus somewhere in South America and I couldn't get rid of it. Like, after four weeks, like the middle of the tour, I was only able with huge glasses of red wine and painkillers to go on stage because my immune system was going nuts." With regards to the taped vocals Kiske explained in a 2021 interview "I never did anything like that, and I will never do that again…When you do a playback, you've gotta be doing the same thing as on the recording, and I was, like, holding the microphone to the audience and my voice was coming through the P.A. and stuff like that…I didn't have a choice. The other choice was to cancel the show, and the band didn't wanna cancel the show." On 28–29 October 2017, the band recorded their concerts in São Paulo, Brazil for a future live album and DVD.

About a potential studio album under the Pumpkins United line-up, Deris stated in March 2018: "We certainly have lots and lots of talks [about it]. This summer, if the chemistry goes on like this, then everything is possible. After recording that particular "Pumpkins United" song, we realized that it's easy working together. [...] Yeah, it was no problem at all, as if we would have worked together for decades already. So, I could see an upcoming album for the future. If the chemistry stays the way it is now, I definitely would say 99 percent yes, we're going for it." When they were interviewed together in June, Weikath stated: "We don't really feel like starting with it because it's going to be a lot of work and it's going to take a lot of time and right now, we are kind of comfy with what we are doing, so to say. So, we are not lying. It's very easy to say; we are just too lazy to get started with that". Hansen stated: "There's a lot of ideas in the room for what we do next and so on. But, nothing is kind of decided. Nothing is ripe for the decision. We leave that open, kind of."

On 21 August 2018, the band announced that, at the request of their label Nuclear Blast, the Pumpkins United line-up would perdure after 2018, and that a live CD and DVD for the Pumpkins United World Tour would be released in early 2019, followed by a new studio album to be recorded later that year for a planned 2020 release, with Weikath, Hansen and Deris acting as a "songwriting trio"; this will be their first studio album to feature Hansen since Keeper of the Seven Keys: Part II in 1988 and the first with Kiske since Chameleon in 1993. The Pumpkins United World Tour concluded on 22 December 2018 in Hamburg.

On 4 October 2019, Helloween performed at the 2019 edition of Rock in Rio and on the same day the live DVD/Blu-ray United Alive and the live album United Alive in Madrid, both recorded during the Pumpkins United World Tour, were released. The first comprises recordings of the band's performances in Madrid WiZink Centre (2017), at Wacken Open Air (2018) and in São Paulo (2017) and the second is a recording of the full performance in Madrid, with songs recorded in shows in Prague, São Paulo, Wacken and Santiago acting as bonus tracks.

On 26 November 2019, the band published a video in which they shared that they had begun recording their next album in Hamburg and that they were planning to resume touring in late 2020. On 1 June 2020, Helloween confirmed that they had postponed their fall European tour to the spring of 2021, due to the COVID-19 pandemic. The band also announced that they had "decided to shift the release" of their new album to early next year; with six years between My God-Given Right and the new album, this marks the longest time between two Helloween studio albums, as the band had never previously spent more than three years without releasing a new studio album. On 25 March 2021, Helloween releases in Japan their new book, an encyclopedia called Seven Keys United Memorial: Complete Collection of Helloween.

In March 2021, it was announced that the band's first album with the Pumpkins United line-up would be titled Helloween, and it was released on 18 June 2021. The album topped German charts and also reached number one in sales in other countries. Following the success of this album, the band launched a comic book and a line of collectible action figures inspired by the bands' cover artwork and lyrical lore. Helloween toured Europe with HammerFall in spring of 2022. By March 2023, according to Kiske, Helloween had begun working on new material for their next album. In May 2023, it was announced that Helloween would be inducted into the Metal Hall of Fame. During this time, Helloween once again toured with HammerFall. On 22 November 2023, Helloween announced plans to take the next few months off in order to focus on the making of their next studio album.

On 15 February 2024, it was announced that the band had signed with Reigning Phoenix Music (RPM) and would be releasing their next studio album in 2025.

On 1 November 2024, Helloween announced a new live double album called Live at Budokan, which was released on 13 December 2024. The album features the recording of the band's 16 September 2023 performance at Tokyo's legendary Nippon Budokan. The band's seventeenth studio album, Giants & Monsters, was released on 29 August 2025.

In July 2026, Kiske announced that an eighteenth studio album from Helloween is in the works. He revealed that they "had way too many songs" that did not end up on Giants & Monsters, and said, "I would say, like, 90% at least already done for the new record. It's not gonna be long. Which shows how creative the band is and how productive [we are]."

== Musical style ==
Helloween has been referred to as the "fathers of power metal", as well as one of the so-called "big four" of the genre's early German scene, along with Grave Digger, Rage and Running Wild, and one of the "big four" bands of the entire genre, alongside Blind Guardian, Sabaton, and DragonForce.

In 2004, Guitar World wrote that, "Helloween were one of the more influential prog-metal bands to come out of Europe in the eighties. Guitarist/original vocalist Kai Hansen combined thrash metal and minor-key melodies into a strange brew of sound and fury." RockLists.com referred to Keeper of the Seven Keys: Part I and Part II as "a pair of records that hit like a galloping cavalry charge with a choir attached", and added, "This is power metal in its first flush, and the band has been called one of the most influential in Europe's '80s metal scene."

== Band members ==
Helloween, band members at Rockharz 2026

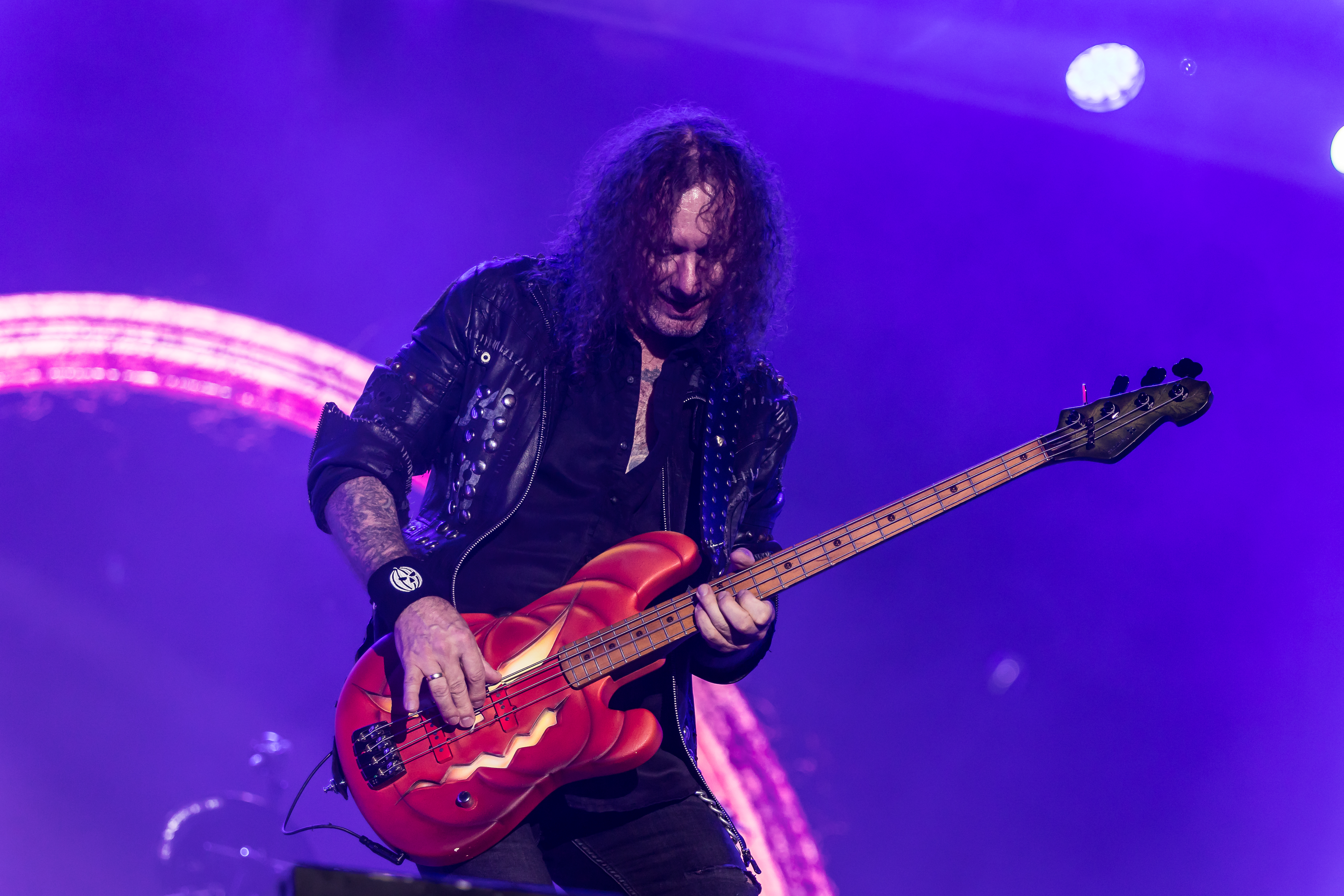
Markus Grosskopf, bass

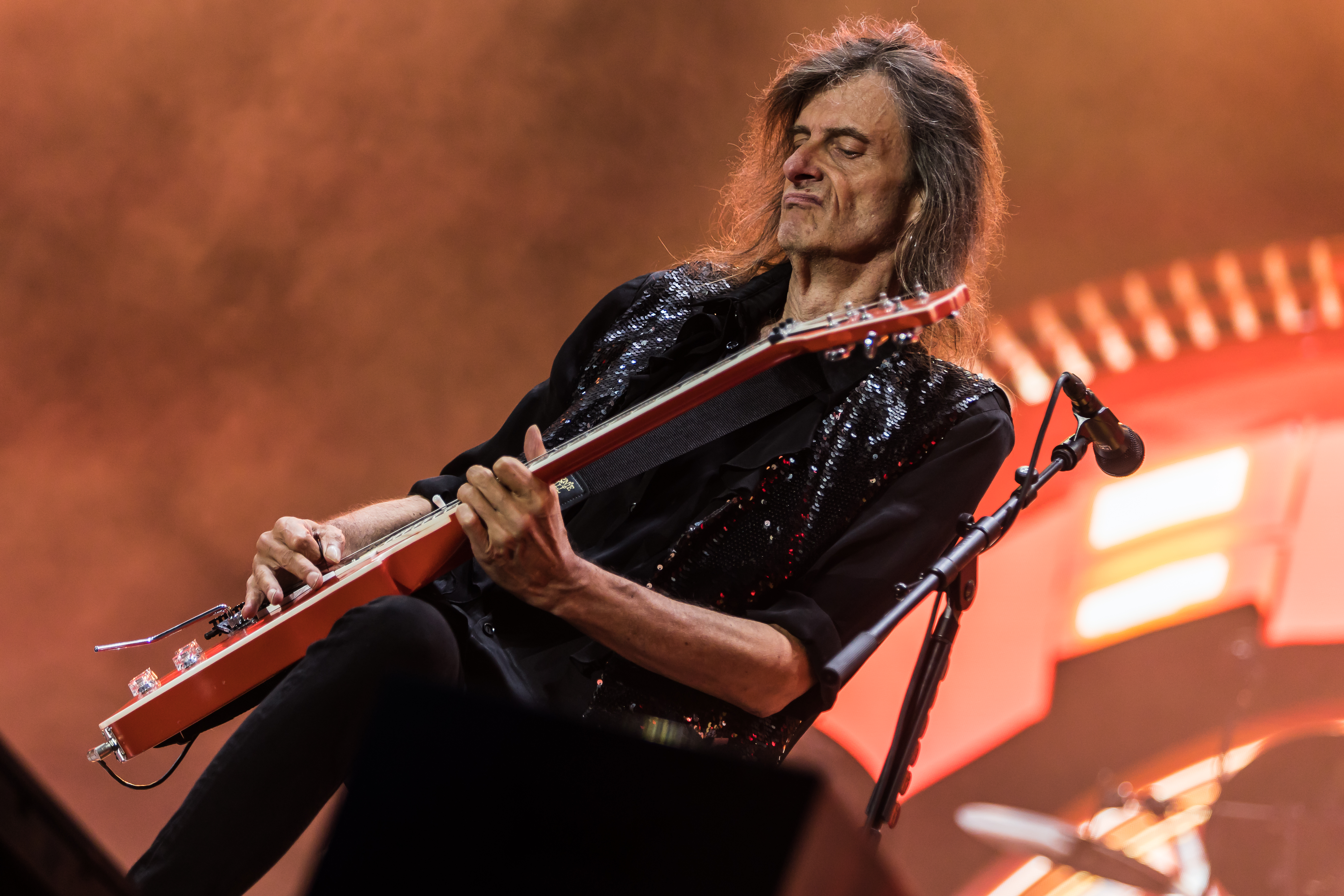
Michael Weikath, guitars

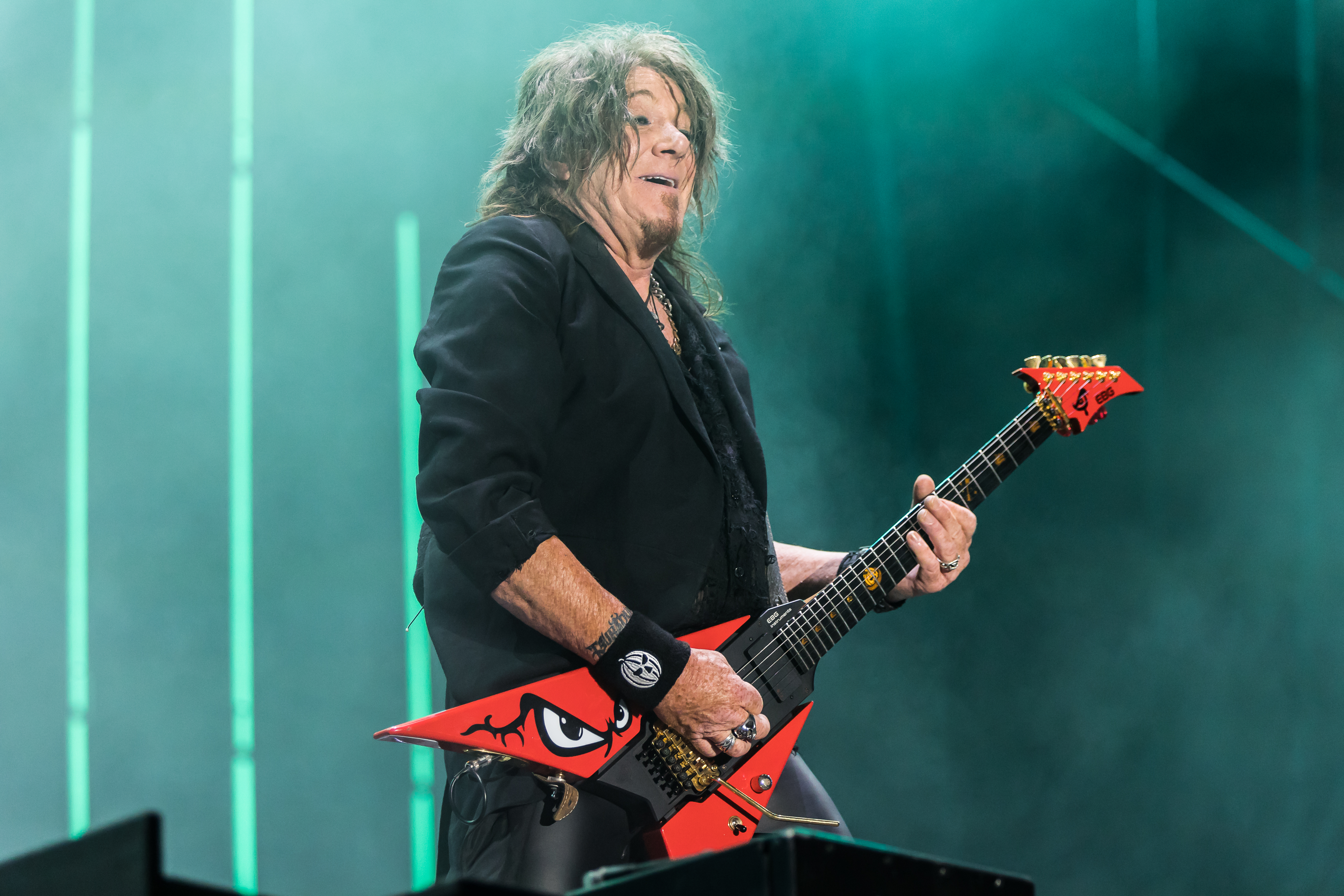
Kai Hansen, guitars

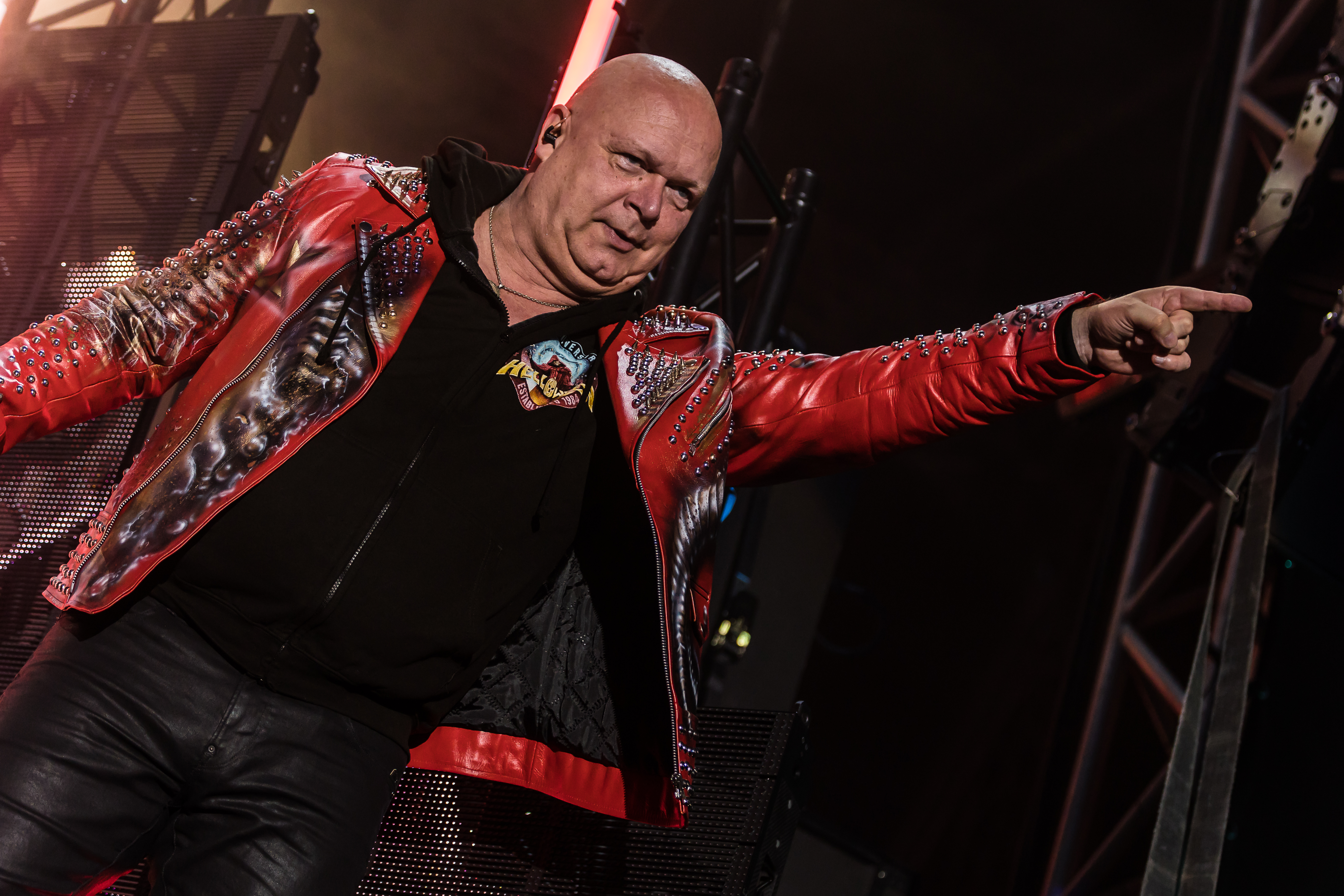
Michael Kiske, vocals

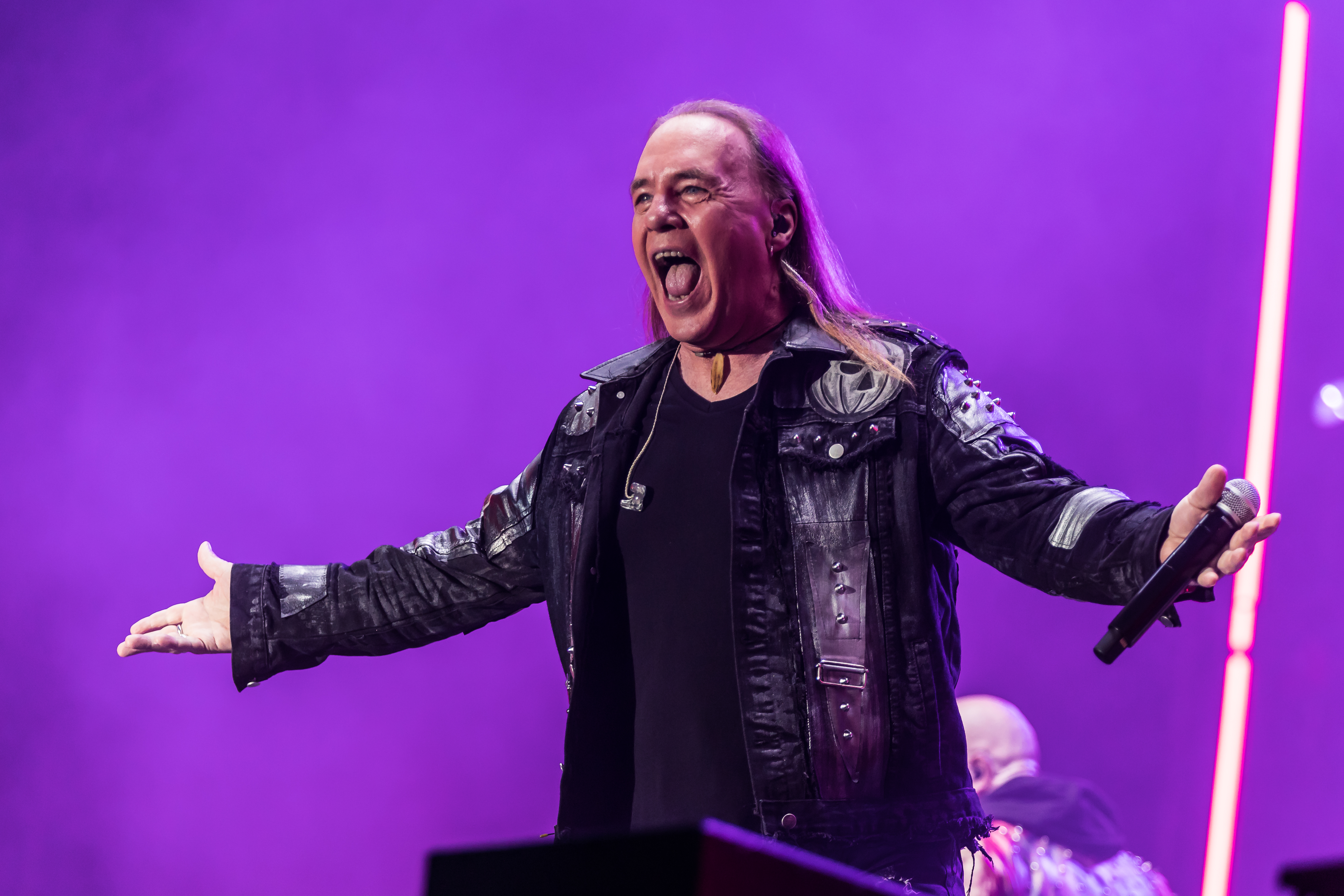
Andi Deris, vocals

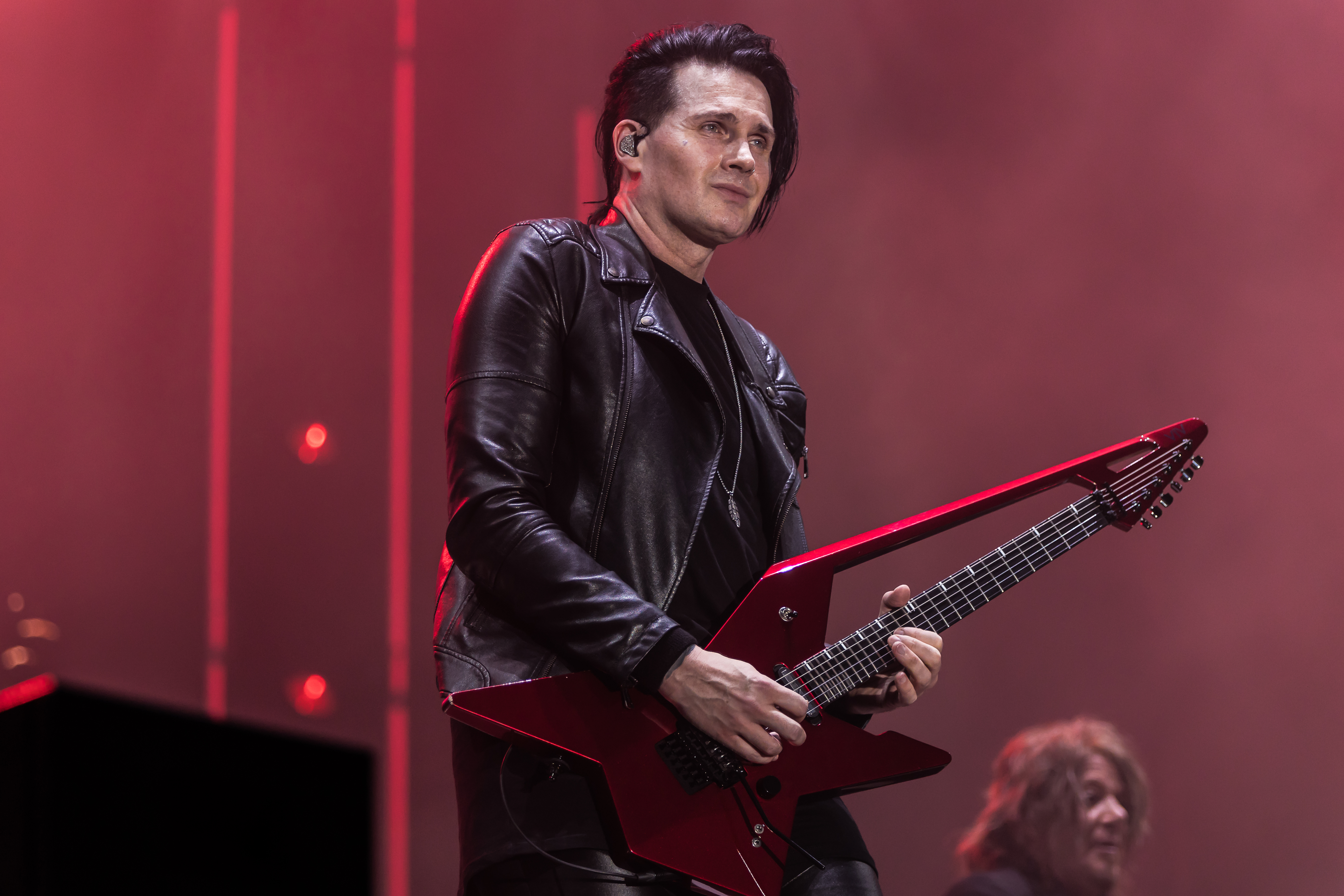
Sascha Gerstner, guitars

Current

- Michael Weikath – guitars, backing vocals (1984–present)
- Markus Grosskopf – bass, backing vocals (1984–present)
- Kai Hansen – guitars (1984–1989, 2016–present), lead vocals (1984–1986, 2016–present), backing vocals (1986–1989, 2016–present)
- Michael Kiske – lead vocals (1986–1993, 2016–present)
- Andi Deris – lead vocals (1994–present)
- Sascha Gerstner – guitars, backing vocals (2002–present)
- Daniel Löble – drums (2005–present)

Additional musicians

- Jörn Ellerbrock – keyboards, piano (1988–2003)
- Ritchie Abdel-Nabi – drums (1993)
- Matthias Ulmer – keyboards (2007–present)
- Eddy Wrapiprou – keyboards (2010)

Former

- Ingo Schwichtenberg – drums (1984–1993; died 1995)
- Roland Grapow – guitars, backing vocals (1989–2001)
- Uli Kusch – drums, backing vocals (1994–2001)
- Mark Cross – drums (2001–2003)
- Stefan Schwarzmann – drums (2003–2005)

== Awards and nominations ==
=== Metal Hammer Awards (GER) ===
Year	Nominee / work	Award	Result
2014	Helloween	Maximum Metal	Won

=== Metal Hall of Fame (USA) ===
2023 – Metal Hall Of Fame

=== Best German Metal Band (GER) ===
2024 – Helloween

=== Top Streamed Artist and Viewers Choice Award ===
2025 – Helloween Thunderflix Awards (won)

=== Viewers Choice Award ===
2025 – Helloween Thunderflix Awards (won)

== Discography ==
- Walls of Jericho (1985)
- Keeper of the Seven Keys: Part I (1987)
- Keeper of the Seven Keys: Part II (1988)
- Pink Bubbles Go Ape (1991)
- Chameleon (1993)
- Master of the Rings (1994)
- The Time of the Oath (1996)
- Better Than Raw (1998)
- The Dark Ride (2000)
- Rabbit Don't Come Easy (2003)
- Keeper of the Seven Keys: The Legacy (2005)
- Gambling with the Devil (2007)
- 7 Sinners (2010)
- Straight Out of Hell (2013)
- My God-Given Right (2015)
- Helloween (2021)
- Giants & Monsters (2025)

== Bibliography ==
- Hellbook (2015)
- Seven Keys United Memorial – Complete Collection of Helloween (2021)
- Helloween: The Full History (2021)
- Helloween: Seekers of the Seven Keys Comic Book (2021) Several issues
