= 7 Sinners =

Studio album by Helloween
- Released: 31 October 2010
- Recorded: 2009–2010 at Mi Sueño Studio, Tenerife, Spain
- Genre: Power metal
- Length: 60:46; 62:19 (limited edition)
- Labels: SPV/Steamhammer, Spinefarm Records (UK)
- Producer: Charlie Bauerfeind

Helloween chronology
Unarmed – Best of 25th Anniversary (2009)	7 Sinners (2010)	Straight Out of Hell (2013)

Singles from 7 Sinners
- 1. "Are You Metal?" Released: 11 October 2010

Professional ratings
Review scores
Source	Rating
About.com	4/5 stars
AllMusic	3/5 stars
BW&BK	7.5/10
Sputnikmusic	4/5 stars

7 Sinners is the thirteenth studio album by German power metal band Helloween, released in 2010. A video clip for "Are You Metal?" was released 31 October 2010. The whole album could be heard on Myspace a week before the physical release. For the first time since 2000's The Dark Ride, each song on the album is a solo composition, i.e. each member has written both the music and lyrics to his song with no additional input from any other member. 7 Sinners sold 1,900 copies in its first week of release in the U.S.

Commenting on the album, bassist Markus Grosskopf said:

After Unarmed we were ready for some real stuff, you know without having discussed what we are going to do everybody had this will to do some very heavy stuff you know. And that's what came out of it [...] I call it my natural born album. The first two tracks we had were "Are You Metal?" and "Where the Sinners Go" and that was kind of the direction we loved so we kind of left it untouched just gave it a heavy sound and put the other songs around it...

== Track listing ==
No.	Title	Writer(s)	Length
1.	"Where the Sinners Go"	Andi Deris	3:36
2.	"Are You Metal?"	Deris	3:35
3.	"Who Is Mr. Madman?"	Sascha Gerstner	5:43
4.	"Raise the Noise"	Michael Weikath	5:07
5.	"World of Fantasy"	Markus Grosskopf	5:15
6.	"Long Live the King"	Deris	4:13
7.	"The Smile of the Sun"	Deris	4:37
8.	"You Stupid Mankind"	Gerstner	4:04
9.	"If a Mountain Could Talk"	Grosskopf	6:44
10.	"The Sage, the Fool, the Sinner"	Weikath	4:00
11.	"My Sacrifice"	Gerstner	4:59
12.	"Not Yet Today"	Deris	1:11
13.	"Far in the Future"	Deris	7:42
Total length:			60:46

Deluxe edition bonus track
No.	Title	Writer(s)	Length
14.	"I'm Free"	Grosskopf	4:10

Japanese bonus tracks
No.	Title	Writer(s)	Length
14.	"Faster We Fall"	Grosskopf	4:47
15.	"Aiming High" (download only)	Grosskopf	4:32

2020 remastered edition bonus tracks
No.	Title	Writer(s)	Length
14.	"I'm Free"	Grosskopf	4:10
15.	"Faster We Fall"	Grosskopf	4:47
16.	"Aiming High"	Grosskopf	4:32

== Personnel ==
The booklet which accompanies the CD contains photos of band members : each one of them is in a position evoking the Seven Deadly Sins.

- Andi Deris (Gluttony) – Vocals
- Michael Weikath (Sloth) – Guitar
- Sascha Gerstner (Pride ?) – Guitar, backing vocals
- Markus Grosskopf (Greed) – Bass
- Dani Löble (Wrath) – Drums

Additional personnel:

- Matthias Ulmer – Keyboards
- Eddy Wrapiprou – Keyboards
- Eberhard Hahn – Flute solo on "Raise the Noise"
- William "Billy" King and Olaf Senkbeil – Choirs
- Ron Deris – Additional backing vocals on "Far in the Future"
- Biff Byford – Spoken prologue to "Who is Mr. Madman?"
- Marcos Moura – Pumpkins Illustrations

== Charts ==
Chart (2010)	Peak position
Austrian Albums (Ö3 Austria)	57
Belgian Albums (Ultratop Wallonia)	175
Croatian Albums Chart	26
Czech Republic Albums Chart	9
Finnish Albums (Suomen virallinen lista)	16
French Albums (SNEP)	65
German Albums (Offizielle Top 100)	25
Greek Albums (IFPI)	13
Italian Albums (FIMI)	78
Japanese Albums (Oricon)	18
Spanish Albums (Promusicae)	51
Slovenian Albums Chart	22
Swedish Albums (Sverigetopplistan)	40
Swiss Albums (Schweizer Hitparade)	38
UK Rock & Metal Albums (Official Charts)	21
US Heatseekers Albums (Billboard)	7
US Independent Albums (Billboard)	45

== Certifications ==
Region	Certification
Czech Republic	Gold
