= My God-Given Right =

Studio album by Helloween
- Released: 29 May 2015
- Recorded: October 2014 – February 2015
- Studios: Mi Sueño Studio, Tenerife, Spain
- Genre: Power metal
- Length: 61:11
- Label: Nuclear Blast
- Producer: Charlie Bauerfeind

Helloween chronology
Straight Out of Hell (2013)	My God-Given Right (2015)	United Alive in Madrid (2019)

My God-Given Right is the fifteenth studio album by German power metal band Helloween. It was released on 29 May 2015.

It is their seventh consecutive album produced by Charlie Bauerfeind, and their first album released under the label Nuclear Blast since 2003's Rabbit Don't Come Easy.

== Production and marketing ==
In October 2014, the band announced they were working on a new album for a May 2015 release, with Charlie Bauerfeind producing, to be recorded at Mi Sueño Studio on Tenerife. On 26 February 2015, the band released the name of the album, as well as the 29 May 2015 release date. According to guitarist and founder Michael Weikath, there was no particular reason for the change of labels other than "plain business".

On 17 April 2015, "Battle's Won" was released as the first single of the album, premiered on Team Rock Radio UK tonight on the Metal Hammer Magazine Show. Days later, Nuclear Blast USA had the premiere of the second single "Lost In America". This song, along with "Battle's Won" were available for instant download only with the album pre-order in iTunes.

== Concept and composition ==
The album is considered by the band as a "back to the roots" album, while still keeping some modern elements.

When the album was announced, Weikath said it would be "just good old classic heavy metal the way it's supposed to be". He added: "[The album] it's more open to the public. I wouldn't say commercial, it's more friendly. That was also what Charlie wanted to do, it's typical of '80s Helloween and modern Helloween at the same time. We didn't want to worry too much about concepts and what to do, and just be the ones that we are. We just wanted to do what we stand for, what we're known for. And that works out very very good I think." He also said the album would be either "one of the best-sold albums or also one of the most criticized by the syndicate side of fans that are there".

Weikath and vocalist Andi Deris agreed there would be "haters" to pan the album, but they intended to keep a "liberal attitude towards heavy metal: to do anything we want — and not follow the directions the know-it-alls would have pushed on us. We remained unfazed and acted out our vision of 'anything goes' in the songwriting process to 'My God-Given Right' because we believe that it is our god-given-right (no pun intended) to do as we please and fulfill our musical vision without any boundaries." Deris also said the album is an attempt to please all generations of fans.

The band composed 33 or 34 songs for the album and had producer Bauerfeind and his team chose the ones that would form the final track list. Deris explained the method by saying:

"[...] we told them not to give us the choice, because when you write a song, it is your baby, you love it to death. If somebody in the band comes and tells you I don't like it, you have a problem inside the band and nobody is that cool. It hurts. So these decisions should actually be done by other people, they like what we do. [...] It's much better than having t [sic] bands killing themselves, like we did in the earlier days."

=== Cover artwork and title ===
The cover art depicts a "pumpkin army" around a The Day After Tomorrow-like, buried-in-the-snow Statue of Liberty. It was once again created by Martin Häusler and it's also available as a 3D lenticular print, visible without 3D glasses. Deris remarked that the cover differs from previous covers because it features little color variation. According to Häusler, they "tried to build a world of ideas, keeping the 'classic Helloween' elements, like the pumpkins on the one hand and a complete new look on the other. [...] A first inspiration came from the album title, My God-Given Right, and some of the song titles, like 'Swing Of A Fallen World', 'Lost In America', 'Battle's Won', etc. During my research, I stumbled upon the blockbuster Day After Tomorrow and the idea of just leaving the world to the 'pumpkins' was born." Deris later explained that the cover reflected Häusler interpretation of the album title, as he understood the name as a reference to a rebellion or something like that. However, the real inspiration for the title (which is also the title of a song) came from words from his father:

"'My God-Given Right' was actually from my father telling me on finishing school and I did not know what to do with my life. You have a big question mark over your head, what should you do? I definitely had that dream of making music like so many kids have, but I was very fortunate to have a father who completely backed me up. He said 'you're my only son – if I see you happy, you make me happy and it's your God-given right to do what you want with your life, or at least give it a try. And whatever you do, I'm behind you.' And my own son last year was more or less asking me the same question, so it went back to the days with my father. I told my son what his Grandfather told me and I thought it's a beautiful title for a song."

In a later interview, he deepened his thoughts, explaining he didn't feel like following "the leader" and "the rules" like a "good German", but instead wished to follow his own dreams. He also referred to the many Germans of his generation that committed suicide, which he blames on them not following their dreams.

== Lyrical themes ==
When asked about the lyrical themes in the album, compared to the world issues covered in songs from the previous album Straight Out of Hell, Deris explained that the band didn't want a pessimist album to mark their 30th anniversary, but cited songs such as "Swing of a Fallen World" and "You, Still of War" as examples of tracks that stay out of the "Happy Happy Helloween" spectrum. Also according to him, the songs go through the members' lives.

The opening track "Heroes" refers to everyday heroes, like poor people having to "fight each day to survive and have something on their tables", people asking for a penny on the streets and those who make any act of kindness. "Battle's Won" was defined as a song "about those ladies and gents that make their money trading lives for weapons".

Inspiration for the title track is the same for the album title. It received a promotional video directed Oliver Sommer of AVA Studios. The video depicts a female warrior fleeing and defending herself from an army of "robotic pumpkin soldiers" until she is cornered and decides to throw them a bomb shaped like the torch of the Statue of Liberty. The wastelands and abandoned industrial areas in which the video is set exist in real life in Germany. According to Sommer, the video is purposely reminiscent of post-apocalyptic films. Intercalated with those scenes, the band is seen performing nearby.

"Stay Crazy" touches the implications of them being a band and being considered not "normal" people because of that, and is also something of a reflection of their past 30 years and how they want to stay like that. Deris compared it to their Master of the Rings-era songs. "Lost in America" recounts a real story involving the band. They were at an unspecified airport, and their flight was canceled, forcing them to wait 17 hours for the next one. When they finally took off, the pilot eventually announced something was wrong with the airplane and they would need to fly back to the airport, since they didn't even know where they were – they were "lost in America". Bassist Markus Grosskopf also said the band drank so much beer that some members of the flight crew had to tell them to stop. The title of the song actually refers to the Southern part of the continent.

"Russian Roulé" is a word play involving Russian roulette and "rock and roll"; it talks about finishing school and not being sure about what to do with life, based on Deris's own experience of aspiring to be a musician and most people not taking him seriously. Guitarist Sascha Gerstner described "The Swing of a Fallen World" as the darkest track on the album and, like Deris, identified some Black Sabbath elements on it, while Deris compared it to their The Dark Ride-era songs. "Like Everybody Else" had parts recorded during the Straight Out of Hell sessions. It was written by Gerstner about some people not understanding him since he was a child and about one just trying to be themselves in spite of people trying to pinch them.

"Creatures in Heaven" conjectures about whether heaven exists, where it is located and what kind of creatures inhabit it. Weikath, who wrote the song, said he tried to capture the essence of old hard rock clubs in the track's intro. "If God Loves Rock 'n' Roll" has the band proposing the theory that God likes rock 'n' roll and heavy metal, or "otherwise he would not have us and all the others do what we are doing", as Grosskopf said. Deris confirmed it as a Kiss-influenced song.

"Living on the Edge" follows a boy who "loses grip in society" and eventually sees no other choice than to become a criminal and how he fails in having society recognize him as a non criminal later. "Claws" draws influences from Led Zeppelin's "Achilles Last Stand", Heart's "Barracuda" and Pink Cream 69's "Livin' My Life for You". The song talks about an unspecified flying object or being that flies around looking for its prey.

"You, Still of War" is the ending track of the regular album and the longest of all editions; it tells the story of a nuclear bomb that is the only survivor of a war. Deris explained:

"That's very serious song. Bombs speaking to the last survivor of the mankind so it's a very brutal theme actually. Which could automatically happen if we step time back where we came from. Because we all grew up during the 80's, and the new generation don't even know about all those things, about a feeling that we had with all Russian and American nuclear shit going on and actually sometimes we in Germany thought that, okay if something happens we are wiped off from the map anyway, because when a war takes place it would be somewhere in mid Europe and mid Europe is Germany so we all grew up with that knowledge that tomorrow could be the last."

== Reception ==
Professional ratings
Review scores
Source	Rating
All About the Rock	6/10
AllMusic	3/5 stars
Metal.de	9/10
Metal Hammer	6/7
Rockcor	4/5 stars
Skulls N Bones	2/5 stars

My God Given Right received mixed to positive reviews by critics upon release.

Writing for All About the Rock, Tim Jones said: "If you like your metal to still sound like it did in the 80s and early 90s, you'll probably love this, but if you've never listened to Helloween before there are better places to start." Jason Z. from Skulls N Bones criticised most of the album tracks, concluding by saying: "There are a few shining stars on My God Given Right, but they are overshadowed by the bad apples that are rotting."

== Track listing ==
No.	Title	Writer(s)	Length
1.	"Heroes"	Sascha Gerstner	3:53
2.	"Battle's Won"	Michael Weikath	4:53
3.	"My God-Given Right"	Andi Deris	3:30
4.	"Stay Crazy"	Deris	4:04
5.	"Lost in America"	Deris	3:35
6.	"Russian Roulé"	Lyrics: Deris / Music: Deris, Gerstner	3:52
7.	"The Swing of a Fallen World"	Deris	4:53
8.	"Like Everybody Else"	Gerstner	4:03
9.	"Creatures in Heaven"	Weikath	6:36
10.	"If God Loves Rock 'n' Roll"	Deris	3:20
11.	"Living on the Edge"	Markus Grosskopf	5:19
12.	"Claws"	Weikath	5:52
13.	"You, Still of War"	Lyrics: Gerstner / Music: Gerstner, Deris	7:21
Total length:			61:11

Limited edition bonus tracks
No.	Title	Writer(s)	Length
14.	"I Wish I Were There"	Deris	4:11
15.	"Wicked Game"	Gerstner	3:56

Digital and Japanese editions bonus track (includes limited edition bonus tracks)
No.	Title	Writer(s)	Length
16.	"Free World"	Markus Grosskopf	3:34

Earbook edition bonus tracks (includes limited edition bonus tracks)
No.	Title	Writer(s)	Length
16.	"Nightmare"	Grosskopf	4:43
17.	"More Than a Lifetime"	Grosskopf	3:55

== Personnel ==
Personnel as displayed in the album booklet.

Helloween

- Andi Deris – lead vocals ("Voice Commander")
- Michael Weikath – lead and rhythm guitars ("Captain of Guitars")
- Sascha Gerstner – lead and rhythm guitars ("Major of Strings")
- Markus Grosskopf – bass ("Bass Invader")
- Daniel Löble – drums ("Sergeant of Skins")

Additional musicians

- Matthias Ulmer – keyboards
- Billy King and Olaf Senkbeil – additional backing vocals

Production

- Charlie Bauerfeind – production, mixing
- Thomas Geiger – editing
- Martin Häusler – photography, artwork and design
- Marcos Moura – pumpkin lyrics-illustrations
- David & Silke Bredebach – webpage & webshop

== Charts ==
Chart (2015)	Peak position
Austrian Albums (Ö3 Austria)	30
Belgian Albums (Ultratop Flanders)	71
Belgian Albums (Ultratop Wallonia)	54
Dutch Albums (Album Top 100)	73
Finnish Albums (Suomen virallinen lista)	5
French Albums (SNEP)	61
German Albums (Offizielle Top 100)	8
Hungarian Albums (MAHASZ)	9
Italian Albums (FIMI)	42
Japanese Albums (Oricon)	9
Norwegian Albums (VG-lista)	37
Scottish Albums (Official Charts)	75
Spanish Albums (Promusicae)	21
Swedish Albums (Sverigetopplistan)	22
Swiss Albums (Schweizer Hitparade)	14
UK Independent Albums (Official Charts)	16
UK Rock & Metal Albums (Official Charts)	8
US Top Rock Albums (Billboard)	27
US Top Hard Rock Albums (Billboard)	9
US Independent Albums (Billboard)	25
US Indie Store Album Sales (Billboard)	18

== Certifications ==
Region	Certification	Certified units/sales
Czech Republic	Gold	5,000
