= Rockfabrik Ludwigsburg =

Music venue in Ludwigsburg, Germany

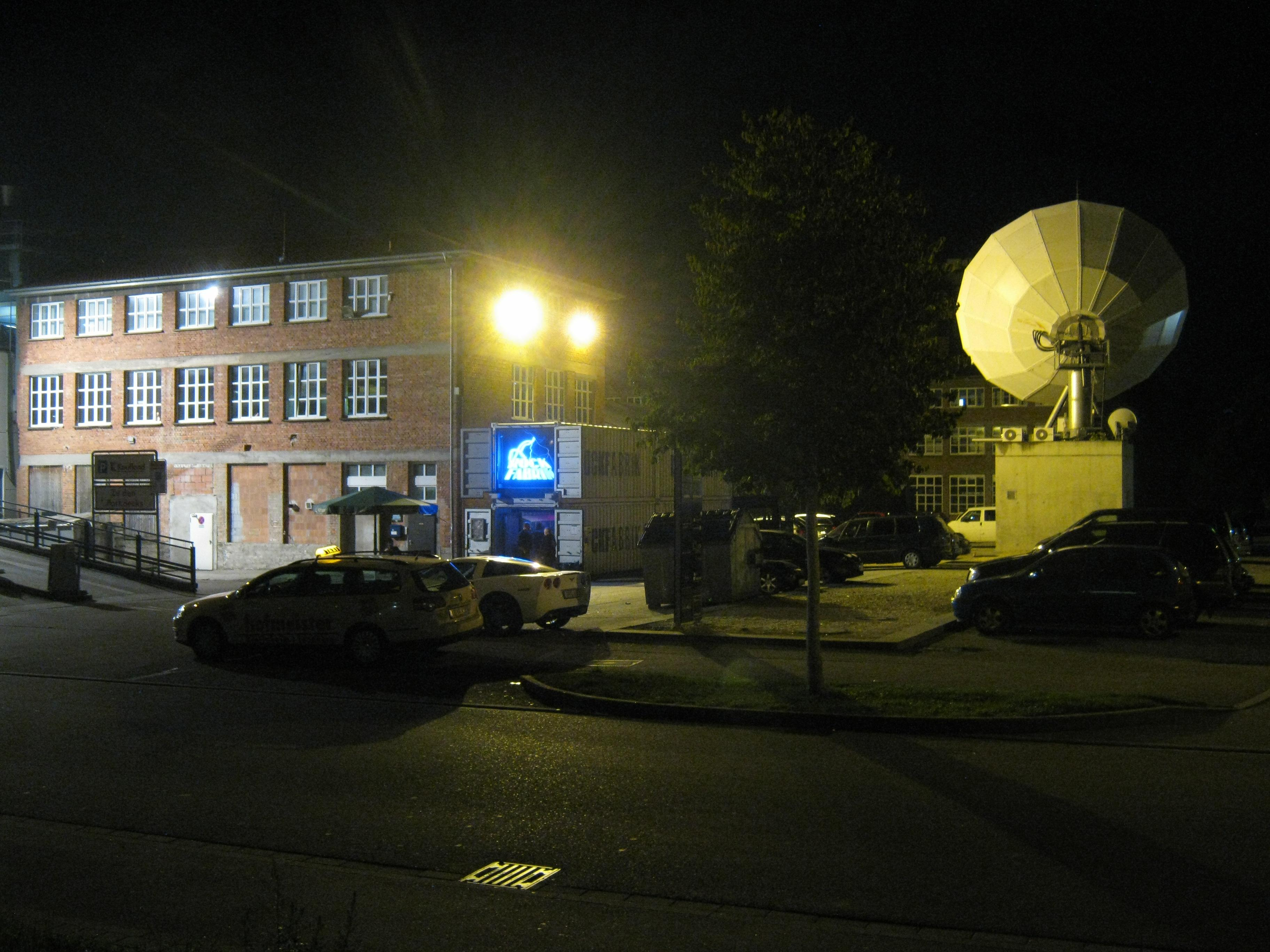
Rockfabrik Ludwigsburg

Rockfabrik Ludwigsburg was a music venue located in Ludwigsburg, Germany. It opened in 1983 on the premises of a former refrigerator factory (ger. 'Fabrik'), from which the name derives. Many notable artists have performed at the Rockfabrik Ludwigsburg, such as Metallica, Iron Maiden, Manowar, TNT, Scorpions, Accept, Queen, Wishbone Ash, and Anthrax.

Since the beginning the venue was rented from the Max-Maier-Immobiliengesellschaft with the contract usually being renewed every five years. In 2019 it was announced that the Rockfabrik must close down with the expiry of the latest contract at the end of 2019 without any further explanation provided.
