= Straight Out of Hell =

Studio album by Helloween
- Released: 18 January 2013
- Recorded: 2012
- Studio: Mi Sueño Studio, Tenerife, Spain
- Genre: Power metal
- Length: 60:01
- Label: The End Records
- Producer: Charlie Bauerfeind

Helloween chronology
7 Sinners (2010)	Straight Out of Hell (2013)	My God-Given Right (2015)

Singles from Straight Out of Hell
- 1. "Burning Sun" Released: October 26, 2012; 2. "Nabataea" Released: January 9, 2013

Professional ratings
Review scores
Source	Rating
Blabbermouth	8.5/10
Metal Forces	9/10
PopMatters	6/10
Sputnikmusic	3/5 stars

Straight Out of Hell is the fourteenth studio album by German power metal band Helloween. It was released in 2013 and produced by Charlie Bauerfeind.

== Overview ==
Regarding the songs, guitarist and founding member Michael Weikath stated:

Straight Out of Hell is the consequent development of the two albums before. The new songs are a continuation of the 7 Sinners directives, only less doom-bound and noticeably more positive. These songs will kick even the laziest listener's ass.

Three months after the album release, he commented on it again, saying he thinks it is "kind of very accessible for the listener. And it's a fun album. It's an album that doesn't give you the creeps or annoys you or whatever".

Andi Deris confirmed that Straight Out of Hell was intentionally made to be a "happy" Helloween album. This was, according to Deris, partly in response to the band's darker material during the previous 10 years, and partly out of the band's interest in releasing a positive album in light of the failure of the 2012 Doomsday Prediction.

War and peace are the themes of the first two songs. Opening track, "Nabataea", refers to the ancient Nabatean Kingdom, which exists in modern Jordan. Andi Deris explained that Nabatea is "a nation which...was probably the only country which never brought war to other countries". A music video was shot for an edited version of "Nabataea". By contrast, the acceptance of conflict by the modern world consumes the second track, "World of War", which explores how contemporary humanity takes war as inevitable and seemingly cares little about the casualties, according to Deris.

Faith is addressed in "Far From the Stars", with bassist Markus Grosskopf explaining that the strength of one's belief, whether associated with a religion or not, is essential for survival. A different tack is taken on the last track, "Church Breaks Down", which highlights the Church's actions throughout the centuries such as its refusal to adapt to scientific developments such as the theory of evolution.

Several songs deal with the follies and occasionally strange beliefs of humanity. "Burning Sun" is more light-hearted, introducing a protagonist who, according to Weikath, dreams of steering a spaceship into the Sun. A version of the track featuring a Hammond organ (performed by Helloween session keyboardist Matthias Ulmer) was dedicated to the late Deep Purple organist Jon Lord and is included as a bonus track on the limited and Japanese editions of the album. On the other hand, "Waiting for the Thunder" is a piano-driven song about an unrepentant man, after doing wrong, simply awaits the punishment rather than trying to make amends. Deris conceded that, "I know sometimes I'm that guy".

In addition to the dedication of the Hammond organ version of "Burning Sun" to Jon Lord, Helloween dedicated "Wanna Be God" to the late Freddie Mercury of Queen due to its affinity to the Queen's stadium rock track, "We Will Rock You". Previously on December 12, 2012, Metal Shock Finland's Chief Editor, Mohsen Fayyazi, compared the drums of this track with a traditional Brazilian folk rhythm and also he wrote "It seems they wanted to wear QUEEN‘s shoes, as this track sounds like “We Will Rock You” by QUEEN to me"

The title track toys with heavy metal clichés while "Years" fixates upon life and death, and "Make Fire Catch the Fly" discusses the fear of rejection that may cause a person to never profess love for another.

== Track listing ==
=== Regular edition ===
No.	Title	Writer(s)	Length
1.	"Nabataea"	Andi Deris	7:03
2.	"World of War"	Sascha Gerstner	4:56
3.	"Live Now!"	Deris, Gerstner	3:10
4.	"Far from the Stars"	Markus Grosskopf	4:41
5.	"Burning Sun"	Michael Weikath	5:33
6.	"Waiting for the Thunder"	Deris	3:53
7.	"Hold Me in Your Arms"	Gerstner	5:10
8.	"Wanna Be God" (dedicated to Freddie Mercury)	Deris	2:02
9.	"Straight Out of Hell"	Grosskopf	4:33
10.	"Asshole"	Gerstner	4:10
11.	"Years"	Weikath	4:22
12.	"Make Fire Catch the Fly"	Deris	4:22
13.	"Church Breaks Down"	Gerstner	6:06
Total length:			60:01

=== Limited edition bonus tracks ===
No.	Title	Writer(s)	Length
14.	"Another Shot of Life" (limited edition bonus track)	Grosskopf	5:13
15.	"Burning Sun (Hammond version)" (limited edition bonus track; dedicated to Jon Lord)	Weikath	5:34

=== Japanese Edition bonus tracks ===
No.	Title	Writer(s)	Length
14.	"No Eternity" (Japanese bonus track)	Grosskopf	3:34
15.	"Burning Sun (Hammond version)" (Japanese bonus track; dedicated to Jon Lord)	Weikath	5:34

== Personnel ==
- Andi Deris – vocals
- Michael Weikath – lead and rhythm guitars, backing vocals
- Sascha Gerstner – lead and rhythm guitars, backing vocals
- Markus Grosskopf – bass, backing vocals
- Daniel Löble – drums

Guest musicians

- Matthias Ulmer – keyboards

Technical staff

- Produced by Charlie Bauerfeind
- Recorded & mixed at Mi Sueño Studio in Tenerife, Spain
- Engineered & mixed by Charlie Bauerfeind for S.C. & Services
- Additional engineering & editing by Thomas Geiger
- Additional backing vocals by William "Billy" King & Olaf Senkbeil
- Cover artwork, 3D design & band photography by Martin Häusler
- Pumpkin illustrations by Marcos Moura

== Charts ==
Chart (2013)	Peak position
Austrian Albums (Ö3 Austria)	22
Belgian Albums (Ultratop Flanders)	86
Belgian Albums (Ultratop Wallonia)	64
Canadian Albums (Billboard)	75
Finnish Albums (Suomen virallinen lista)	4
French Albums (SNEP)	50
German Albums (Offizielle Top 100)	4
Hungarian Albums (MAHASZ)	10
Japanese Albums (Oricon)	11
Norwegian Albums (VG-lista)	21
Spanish Albums (PROMUSICAE)	46
Swedish Albums (Sverigetopplistan)	6
Swiss Albums (Schweizer Hitparade)	12
UK Rock & Metal Albums (OCC)	24
US Billboard 200	97
