= Invisible Circles =

Studio album by After Forever
- Released: 25 March 2004
- Recorded: July–October 2003
- Studios: Excess (Rotterdam, Netherlands); Gate (Wolfsburg, Germany); Arts Music Recording (Rhoon, Netherlands)
- Genres: Progressive metal; symphonic gothic metal
- Length: 59:03
- Label: Transmission
- Producers: Hans Pieters; After Forever

After Forever chronology
Exordium (2003)	Invisible Circles (2004)	Remagine (2005)

Singles from Invisible Circles
- 1. "Digital Deceit" Released: 20 May 2004

Invisible Circles is the third studio album by Dutch symphonic metal band After Forever. It was released on 25 March 2004, by the small Dutch label Transmission Records. It is After Forever's first full-length album since the dismissal of guitarist and composer Mark Jansen, whose musical tastes had strongly influenced the sound of their first work Prison of Desire (2000) and their successful second offering Decipher (2001). In this work After Forever choose a new musical direction, mostly revolving around elements of progressive metal instead of the gothic and symphonic metal of previous albums. The creative process for Invisible Circles took more than a year and required the use of three recording studios in the Netherlands and Germany. A long tour to support the album brought the band to some of the most important European rock festivals and to Central and South America.

Invisible Circles is a concept album about the dynamics of quarrelsome families and psychological child abuse. The theme was inspired by guitarist Sander Gommans' work as an art teacher, in direct contact with dysfunctional families and teenage problems. It is also a metal opera, with a storyline that follows the lives of an abused child and her parents since her conception to adulthood. The album was received with mixed reviews, but entered the charts in the Netherlands and Belgium.

== Background ==
By the end of 2001, After Forever appeared as rising stars on the dynamic scene of Dutch metal, which included bands like The Gathering, Within Temptation, Gorefest and Ayreon. Their second album Decipher (2001) had received very positive reviews and their name was well known in the underground scene of the Netherlands. Critics were impressed by the remarkable musicianship of the young members of the band and in particular by Floor Jansen's vocals, both in studio and in live performances. In contrast with these premises for a bright future, the relationships within the band were not so idyllic. Soon after the release of Decipher, After Forever faced a strong creative contrast between founding member and guitarist Mark Jansen and the rest of the band. Mark Jansen had been the main composer of the band together with Sander Gommans and his love for movie soundtracks and classical music had had a strong influence on the musical style of After Forever’s first two albums, Prison of Desire (2000) and Decipher. Moreover, his interest for religious and moral themes had characterized his lyrics for many songs, often collected under a common title (e.g. The Embrace That Smothers and My Pledge of Allegiance). In the next album, Mark Jansen meant to further explore complex interactions between classical instruments, choruses in Latin and death metal elements, while Gommans and the others preferred a more direct and aggressive approach to music, retaining some elements that made the sound of the band recognizable, but expanding it in new and different directions. These musical differences led to Mark Jansen leaving the band, in what he felt as an actual dismissal.

I think my story has a lot in common with the one of Morten Veland. I was also basically fired from the band.

— Mark Jansen

He quickly formed another band called Sahara Dust, which later developed into the symphonic metal band Epica. His place was taken by Bas Maas, who had been the guitar technician for After Forever during the tours of 2001 and 2002. August and September 2002 were dedicated to a European tour, supporting Finnish act Nightwish and attending some rock festivals, which exposed the band to larger audiences and gained them even more favourable press. Further media exposure came from Floor Jansen's collaboration with Dutch multi-instrumentalist and composer Arjen Anthony Lucassen, for the recording of Star One's album Space Metal and the subsequent tour in late 2002. Jansen's activities, as well as the regular jobs and studies of the After Forever band members, reduced the band's live performances for the rest of 2002 and half of 2003. It was known that the band was working at a new album from the beginning of 2003, but their first release was the EP Exordium in October 2003, containing an instrumental track, three new songs and two covers. In Jansen’s words "the EP Exordium was like an introduction to this new full length album and the subjects of the lyrics are already connected to the concept (...) meaning they are also dealing with modern, social problems".

The reviewers noticed some musical changes in the new work, but some of them suspended their judgement, waiting for a full album to express their opinions about the new course of After Forever.

== Concept and storyline ==
The concept of Invisible Circles was shaped by After Forever's singer and lyricist Floor Jansen, taking inspiration from Sander Gommans' job as an art teacher. His daily contact with children with social and family problems had given him the desire to make people aware of these problems by incorporating their stories into songs. He had also realized that those children's problems often stemmed from the psychological traumas that their parents had experienced in their past. Gommans described the title and the concept of the album in these terms: "Invisible Circles describes the paths of life that someone can follow. Life consists of several circles that you can follow; many times you will come back at the beginning of a circle, although you have tried to get out of that particular circle."

The plot revolves around a dysfunctional family, comprising a father, a mother, their daughter and the father's mother. The story begins with two lovers, whose relationship is running dry. They decide to have a child, which the woman believes may save their relationship ("Between Love and Fire"). The birth of a baby girl destroys in the mother her hopes for a brilliant professional career and smothers her passion. On the other hand, the newborn child causes in the father a stiffening of his feelings and the refusal to compromise his career for a "spoilt brat" ("Sins of Idealism"). The girl, perceived in the family as an unwanted burden, tries to adapt to the psychological abuse she receives, but she is the object of frequent quarrels and grows sad and depressed ("Beautiful Emptiness"). She searches for quietness and strength in her inner fantasy world, and friendship and love on the internet, becoming ever more detached from the real world and eccentric in the eyes of her schoolmates and parents ("Eccentric", "Digital Deceit", "Through Square Eyes"). The line of pain that connects the child to her parents appears indestructible and the situation gets worse when the father thinks of leaving ("Blind Pain", "Two Sides"). The intervention of the girl's grandmother reveals that the father was himself a neglected child and a victim of his family ("Victim of Choices"). The father's anger is a reaction to his abuse as a child and this realization seems to soften the girl's pain, bringing her out of her defensive shell ("Reflections"). In conclusion, the grown-up daughter, now a mother herself, faces the same dilemmas of her parents and is bound to repeat her parents' mistakes, closing the invisible circle that endures from one generation to another ("Life's Vortex").

== Production ==
Sander Gommans started the composition of the basic melodies for Invisible Circles at the beginning of 2003 in his home studio in Reuver, working at the same time on new songs for the EP Exordium. This part of the creative process had been shared with Mark Jansen for the previous albums and it would be shared with keyboard player Joost van den Broek for the following ones. Gommans wrote the songs for the new album with the precise idea of pushing the music of the band closer to progressive metal, reducing the gothic atmospheres of the previous releases to a minimum and adopting as many different musical styles as he felt necessary to the convey the message of the songs. Meanwhile, his fiancée Floor Jansen was writing the lyrics and shaping the plot for the concept album.

"Digital Deceit"
The combination of classical instruments, operatic voice and heavy metal was a typical feature of After Forever songs.

The band reunited at Excess Studios in Rotterdam in July 2003, a few weeks after recording Exordium, to arrange the new songs and to record the instrumental tracks, under supervision of producer Hans Pieters and sound engineer Dennis Leidelmeijer. Every member of the band contributed to the music, which is credited for the most part to all six musicians. When the instrumental tracks were ready, the band moved in August 2003 to Gate Studio in Wolfsburg, Germany, where all solo vocal parts were arranged by the band, under supervision of American singer and producer Amanda Somerville. She also contributed, along with Jay Lansford, the recited parts that connect the songs to each other and explain parts of the plot. The solo vocals of Jansen, Gommans and Bas Maas were recorded separately by producers Sascha Paeth and Michael "Miro" Rodenberg. Female soprano vocals, grunts and clean male vocals represent in the songs different feelings and behaviours of the characters. The final stage of the recording process was executed at Arts Music Recording studio in Rhoon from 20 to 24 October 2003, under supervision of Peter Arts. The orchestra and choir parts were arranged there by Cees' Kieboom, who also contributed some additional keyboards to smooth the transition between the different instrumental parts. The final mixing of all the parts was executed by Sascha Paeth at The Pathway Studio in Wolfsburg, Germany in November and December 2003, except the instrumental introduction "Childhood in Minor" mixed by Sander Gommans. The album was mastered at Sound Factory by Peter van 't Riet for a release in early 2004.

Invisible Circles was released by Transmission Records on 25 March 2004. "Digital Deceit" was the only single issued from the album and released on 20 May 2004. A high tech video clip was produced for the song by D'iMages, the same company that had done the video clip for the 2003 single "My Choice", extracted from Exordium. The video was aired on Dutch MTV and on local musical TV stations.

== Packaging ==
After Forever in 2003, wearing the black and blue costumes and with Lando van Gils still a member of the band

The artwork for the album was created by German designer Carsten Drescher and his graphics company Media Logistics. Drescher was responsible for the After Forever logo and the cover concepts of every After Forever album and single since then. The girl he photographed is in fact his daughter Aimee Drescher, who also appeared in the video clip for the song "Digital Diceit". He inserted the photos in a dark urban landscape tinted blue, completing the front cover artwork with the digital overlay of circles in the water to evoke the title of the album. The same circles were extensively used in the CD booklet and in every other artwork related to the album. Together with the dominant blue colour the circles were also present in the live show scenography.

The photos of the band were taken by Dutch photographer Angelique van Woerkom in November 2003 and each member dressed in a tight black and blue suit with a lightning motif, the same colors of the CD sleeve. The same suits were used for the video clip of the single "Digital Deceit" and sometimes appeared in live shows during the following tour.

On 11 November 2016, Invisible Circles was re-released on streaming, containing a remastered version of the album along with single edits, previously unreleased studio sessions and an interview. Physically, this edition was released on 2 December as a three-disc set and included a similarly expanded edition of Exordium on disc three.

== Tour ==
The Invisible Circles tour started in February 2004, just before the album release, in Mexico, home of the independent label Raw Metal Records, which distributed After Forever albums for all the American continent. An intensive European tour followed, touching the Netherlands, Germany and France.

Two months after the release of the album, keyboard player Lando van Gils left the band on amicable terms. He played his last gig with the band at The Bosuil, Weert, on 14 May 2004. He was replaced by keyboard player Joost van der Broek, coming from the Dutch progressive rock band Sun Caged, who completed the rest of the tour. Van den Broek had played with Floor Jansen during the Star One tour of 2002, where he also met Gommans. The tour brought the band to play at the important Graspop, Pinkpop and Dynamo festivals in Belgium and the Netherlands. The Pinkpop Festival performance on 30 May 2004, was televised for a Dutch TV station. The first leg of the tour culminated with the performance at the Wacken Open Air festival, on 7 August 2004.

New dates of the tour were added at the end of the year, but some shows were cancelled when drummer André Borgman was admitted to a hospital and diagnosed with lung cancer at an initial stage. The official site of the band reported the news of Borgman’s illness and confirmed some shows, with Ayreon, Star One and Gorefest drummer Ed Warby standing-in for Borgman. The band spent the first half of 2005 concentrating on the material for the new album Remagine, while Borgman received intensive treatment to cure his cancer. Luckily, the cures were successful and Borgman was back behind his drum kit for the final leg of the Invisible Circles tour in South America in August 2005.

== Critical and commercial reception ==
Professional ratings
Review scores
Source	Rating
AllMusic	3.5/5 stars
Maximum Metal	7/10
The Metal Crypt	2.7/5
Metal Italia	6.5/10
Metal Storm	8.5/10
Musical Discoveries	5/5 stars
RevelationZ Magazine	8/10

After the almost unanimous praise received by the album Decipher and the perplexities raised by the new musical direction of the EP Exordium, there were great expectations for the new album by fans and specialized press alike. The complexity of the music and concept of Invisible Circles produced mixed reviews, ranging from highest praise to complete failure, even in the same publication. The bold move of making a concept album about such a controversial matter was generally appreciated but, as Eduardo Rivadavia said in his AllMusic review, this could be a "slightly overambitious creation". The Maximum Metal reviewer states that "concept albums are always hard to pull off and not many bands can do it well" and "here is another failed attempt". It was the general opinion of most reviewers that Floor Jansen's lead vocals are at her best and "her performance here is powerful, dramatic and very impressive overall, no matter how she chooses to sing". However, her lyrics were sometimes considered a weak point of the album, despite the fact that the band "placed as much emphasis" on them "as they did on the music". Sam Grant of Sonic Cathedral Webzine considered them "trite" and "disappointing". In particular, the spoken dialogue by Somerville and Lansford was generally considered badly acted and detrimental to the music which, on the contrary, was generally considered the strong point of the album. The change of musical direction, with the introduction of progressive metal elements, and the many variations of style adopted in the songs were generally praised, to the point that a Metal Storm reviewer compares After Forever to "Symphony X with Floor Jansen on vocals". Only a few reviewers remained nostalgic of the gothic and symphonic sound of Decipher and denounced a "lack of direction" and "too much confusion" in the music of the album.

The album sold enough in the Benelux to remain in the Dutch Mega Album Top 100 chart for eleven weeks and in the Belgian Ultratop 50 Albums chart for two.

It reached position No. 24 in the Netherlands and position No. 74 in Belgium. The single "Digital Deceit" reached position No. 41 in the Single Top 100 chart in the Netherlands.

== Track listing ==
All lyrics are written by Floor Jansen, except where noted; all music is composed by After Forever, except where noted.

Invisible Circles track listing
No.	Title	Music	Length
1.	"Childhood in Minor" (instrumental)	Sander Gommans	1:21
2.	"Beautiful Emptiness"		5:25
3.	"Between Love and Fire"		4:57
4.	"Sins of Idealism"		5:21
5.	"Eccentric"	Lando van Gils; Jansen	4:11
6.	"Digital Deceit"		5:38
7.	"Through Square Eyes"		6:23
8.	"Blind Pain"		6:47
9.	"Two Sides"		4:34
10.	"Victim of Choices"		3:22
11.	"Reflections"		5:11
12.	"Life's Vortex"		5:53
Total length:			59:03

2016 reissue – disc one: Invisible Circles: The Album (bonus tracks)
No.	Title	Length
13.	"Digital Deceit" (single version)	4:07
14.	"Eccentric" (orchestral version)	4:35
15.	"Sins of Idealism" (single version)	4:11
16.	"Blind Pain" (aggressive version)	4:16
Total length:		76:08

2016 reissue – disc two: Invisible Circles: The Sessions
No.	Title	Length
1.	"Childhood in Minor" (session version)	2:04
2.	"Beautiful Emptiness" (session version)	5:25
3.	"Between Love and Fire" (session version)	4:57
4.	"Sins of Idealism" (session version)	5:19
5.	"Eccentric" (session version)	4:08
6.	"Digital Deceit" (session version)	5:38
7.	"Through Square Eyes" (session version)	6:23
8.	"Blind Pain" (session version)	6:19
9.	"Two Sides" (session version)	4:34
10.	"Victim of Choices" (session version)	3:21
11.	"Reflections" (session version)	5:12
12.	"Life's Vortex" (session version)	5:53
13.	"Two Sides" (single version)	3:17
14.	"Interview with André Borgman and Bas Maas"	9:50
Total length:		72:20

2016 reissue – disc three: Exordium: The Album – The Sessions
No.	Title	Lyrics	Music	Length
1.	"Line of Thoughts" (instrumental)		Gommans	2:15
2.	"Beneath"			4:52
3.	"My Choice"			4:52
4.	"Glorifying Means"			4:59
5.	"The Evil That Men Do" (Iron Maiden cover)	Bruce Dickinson; Steve Harris; Adrian Smith	Dickinson; Harris; Smith	4:50
6.	"One Day I'll Fly Away" (Randy Crawford cover)	Joe Sample; Will Jennings	Sample; Jennings	4:43
7.	"My Choice" (single version)			4:00
8.	"The Evil That Men Do" (single version)			3:18
9.	"My Choice" (acoustic version)			4:00
10.	"Line of Thoughts" (session version)			2:18
11.	"Beneath" (session version)			4:53
12.	"My Choice" (session version)			4:52
13.	"Glorifying Means" (session version)			5:00
14.	"The Evil That Men Do" (session version)			4:50
15.	"One Day I'll Fly Away" (session version)			4:44
Total length:				64:26

== Personnel ==
After Forever

- Floor Jansen – female vocals
- Sander Gommans – guitar, grunts
- Bas Maas – guitar, clean male vocals
- Lando van Gils – keyboards
- Luuk van Gerven – bass guitar
- André Borgman – drums

Production

- Hans Pieters – production, engineering
- Dennis Leidelmeijer – engineering
- Sascha Paeth – vocal producer, mixing
- Miro – vocal producer, engineering
- Hans van Vuuren – executive producer
- Peter van 't Riet – mastering

Additional musicians

- Cees' Kieboom – piano, keyboards, strings and choir arrangements
- Jeanne Biessen – violin
- Herman van Haaren – violin
- Yvonne van de Pol – viola
- Carla Schrijner – violoncello
- Sartje van Camp – violoncello
- Hans Cassa – choral bass vocals
- Caspar de Jonge – choral tenor vocals
- Martine de Jager – choral alto vocals
- Ellen Bakker – choral soprano vocals
- Amanda Somerville – reciting voice, vocal coach
- Jay Lansford – reciting voice
