= ReVamp =

Dutch metal band

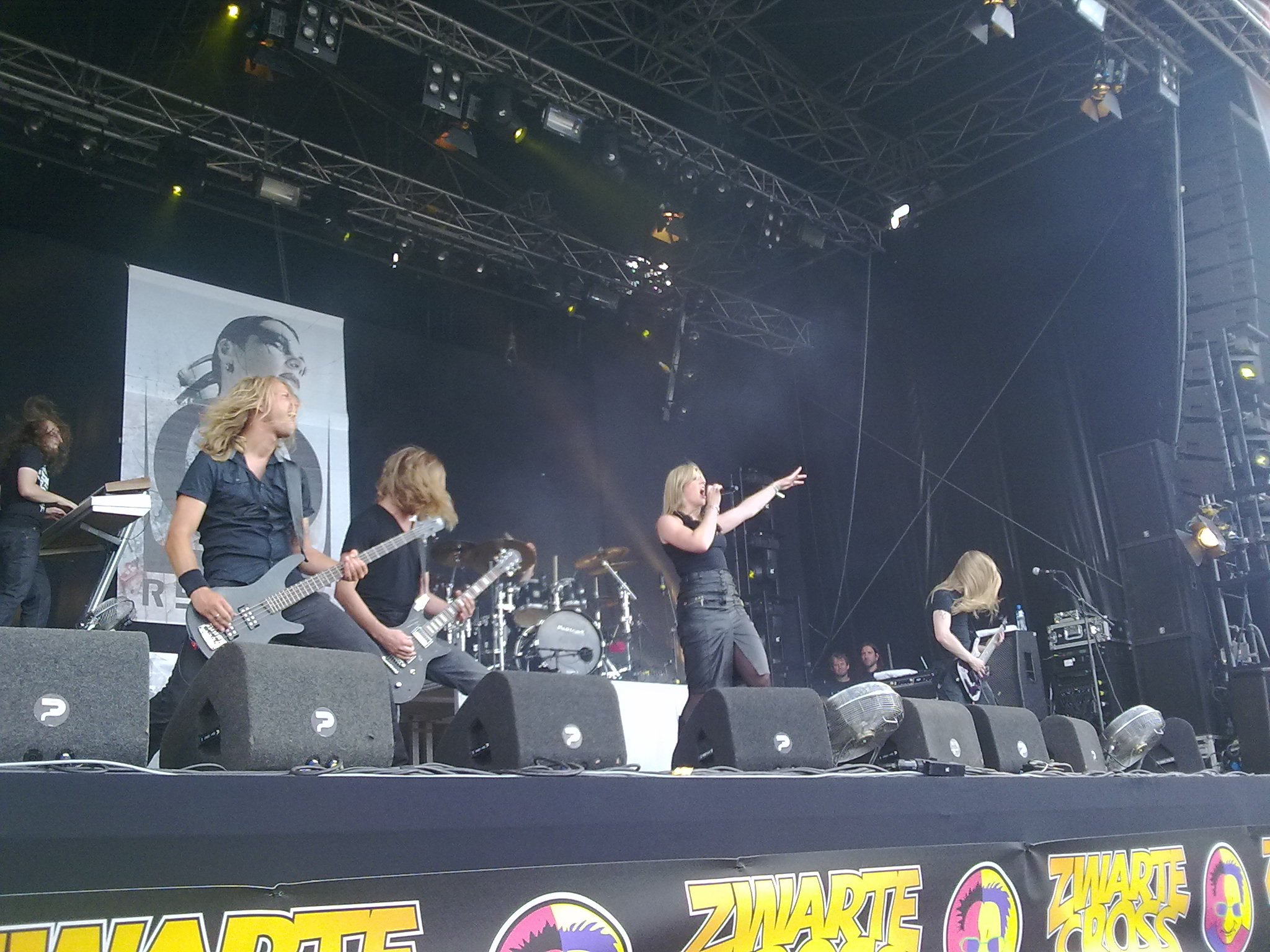
- ReVamp performing in 2010

Background information
- Origin: Netherlands
- Genres: Progressive metal; symphonic metal
- Years active: 2009–2016
- Label: Nuclear Blast
- Past members: Floor Jansen; Jaap Melman; Matthias Landes; Jord Otto; Arjan Rijnen; Ruben Wijga; Henk Vonk
- Website: revampmusic.com

ReVamp was a Dutch progressive metal band formed by singer Floor Jansen after her previous band After Forever disbanded in 2009.

== Background ==
After Forever member Sander Gommans suffered a burnout at the beginning of 2008, Jansen posted on her website that while the band was put on hold, she was going to use the opportunity to start writing music with Jørn Viggo Lofstad for a new musical project. In February 2009, After Forever ultimately decided to call it quits, and on 16 June 2009 Floor announced through her MySpace site that she had started a new metal band, which put her musical project with Jørn Viggo on hold. On 17 October 2009 Jansen announced that the name of the band was going to be ReVamp.

== History ==
=== ReVamp (2009–2010) ===
Jansen wrote all the music for their self-titled album in 2009. She collaborated with her old After Forever bandmate, Joost van den Broek and Grip Inc guitarist Waldemar Sorychta. The trio wrote and recorded everything, while Koen Herfst (I Chaos, Bagga Bownz, Armin van Buuren) recorded the drum tracks. Afterwards, Jansen recruited new band members for a live band. In 2010, their first album got released under Nuclear Blast. The band began to tour around the Netherlands and had many successful club shows and festivals. ReVamp joined Epica on their European tour.

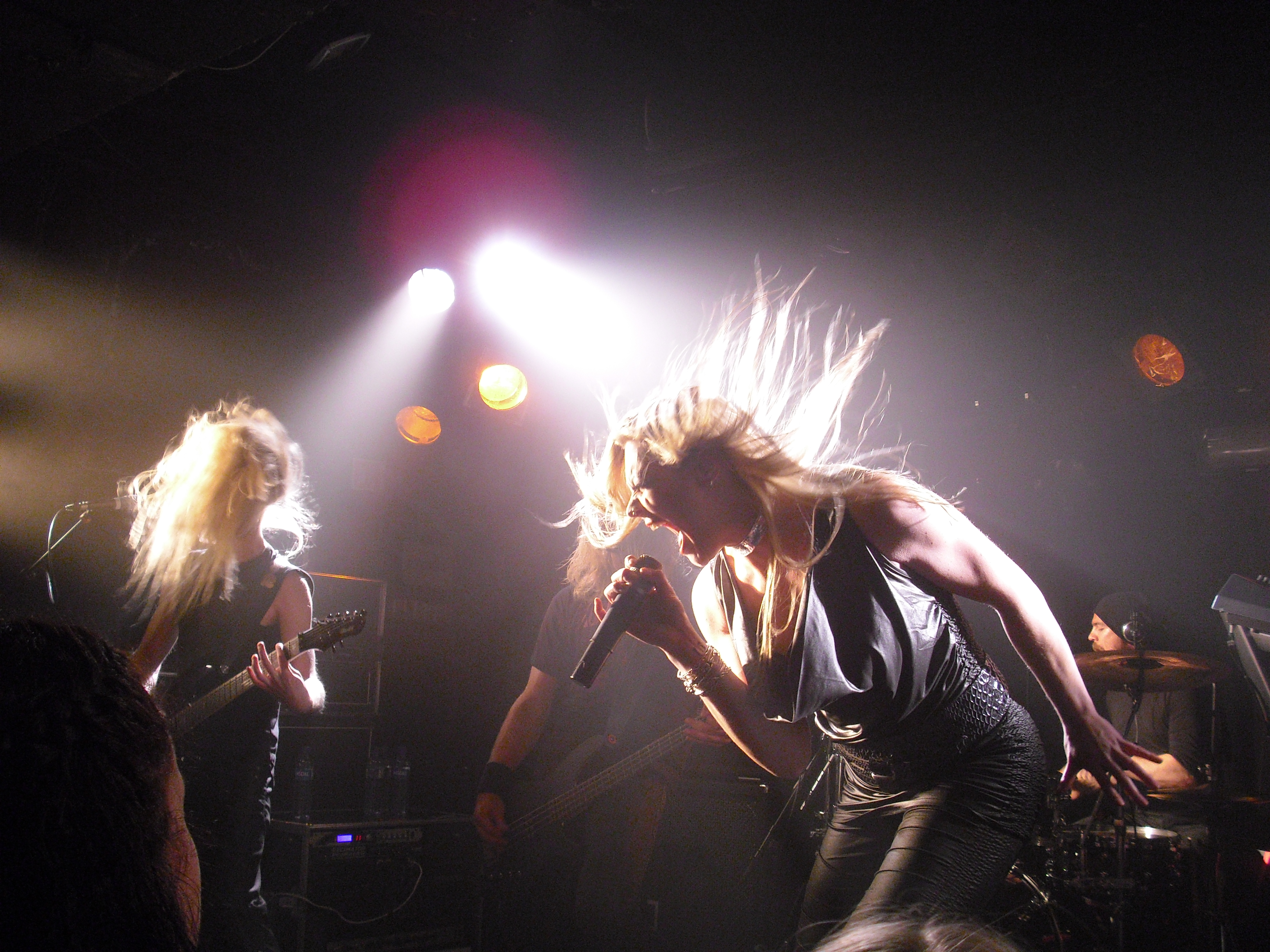
ReVamp in 2010

=== Burnout and Nightwish (2011–2013) ===
Jansen's health began to decline, thus she had to stop working and teaching. Since her health issues turned for the worse, all concerts were cancelled. Floor was diagnosed with a burnout herself just like her former bandmate. The band was inactive for quite sometime. By the end of 2011, Jansen finally joined Mayan for one Brazilian show. She had not recuperated, but she was close to a full recovery. ReVamp began writing new songs for their second album which was scheduled to be released in the spring of 2013. In October 2012, Finnish symphonic metal band Nightwish contacted Jansen to join them for their remainder Imaginaerum World Tour since they had parted ways with former vocalist Anette Olzon. Because of her commitment to Nightwish, the band postponed the release of their upcoming installment to autumn 2013.

=== Wild Card and disbandment (2013–2016) ===
ReVamp entered the studio in the beginning of the year. The album was announced to be scheduled for release in August 2013 through Nuclear Blast again. Jaap Melman decided to quit the band and the decision had a mutual understanding for both parties involved. Since Melman left before any recordings were done for their next album, Stream of Passion bassist Johan van Stratum filled in on short notice. Soon after, Henk Vonk was announced as ReVamp's newest bassist. On 7 June, the band announced via Facebook that their new album would be called Wild Card. The album features several guest musicians. This includes Johan van Stratum, Mark Jansen of Epica, Marcela Bovio of Stream of Passion, Daniël de Jongh of Textures, and finally Devin Townsend of Strapping Young Lad and The Devin Townsend Project.

In October 2013, Jansen was hired as an official member of Nightwish (along with wind instrumentalist Troy Donockley) and spent half of 2014 and 2015 recording and preparing the release of their album Endless Forms Most Beautiful. When asked if ReVamp was on hiatus, she answered "It is, it has to be", because she doesn't wish to perform in both bands at the same time if she's unable to give 100% of her devotion and time.

Once we're done with this [Nightwish] tour we'll have to sit together and see where everybody is in their lives, and see if there's a chance to continue. It would be great, but I can't tell the future.

On 29 September 2016, a post was made to the group's official Facebook page informing fans that they had disbanded. The post read "We are sad to inform you that ReVamp has officially stopped. After two great albums it is unfortunately not possible for the founding front lady Floor Jansen to have a band next to Nightwish. Projects perhaps, but a band deserves a 100% devotion which is impossible to deliver to two bands at the same time." Jansen added: "I am proud of the 2 albums we made together! ReVamp has such talented and great musicians that I wouldn't want them to wait any longer for me to find the time and the passion it needs to make another album. I also don't want to give fans false hope. ReVamp lived a short and bumpy but exciting life but now it's time for new bands and projects to start. I thank everyone involved for the love and dedication!"

Besides Jansen's joining Nightwish, other band members remained active in the Dutch metal community. Arjan Rijnen became a touring guitarist in Symphonic Death Metal act MaYaN. Jord Otto would join Anneke van Giersbergen and several other veterans of the scene in super-group Vuur before it too disbanded. Ruben Wijga would lend his talents to several projects on a guest basis, most notably playing keyboards for Yvette Boertje's The Theater Equation, a live performance of Ayreon's 2004 album. In 2019, Wijga would join Blackbriar as its keyboard player.

== Band members ==
Final line-up

- Floor Jansen – vocals (2009–2016)
- Jord Otto – lead guitar (2010–2016)
- Arjan Rijnen – rhythm guitar (2010–2016)
- Ruben Wijga – keyboards (2010–2016)
- Matthias Landes – drums (2010–2016)
- Henk Vonk – bass (2013–2016)

Former

- Jaap Melman – bass (2010–2012)

Timeline

== Discography ==
=== Studio albums ===
Title	Album details	Peak chart positions			
Title	Album details	NLD	FIN	BEL (FL)	BEL (WA)
ReVamp	Released: 26 May 2010; Label: Nuclear Blast; Formats: CD, digital download	58	—	—	—
Wild Card	Released: 23 August 2013; Label: Nuclear Blast; Formats: CD, digital download	43	21	97	130
"—" denotes a recording that did not chart or was not released in that territory.

=== Singles ===
Title	Year	Album
The Anatomy of a Nervous Breakdown: On the Sideline	2013	"Wild Card"
