= After Forever (disambiguation) =

After Forever was a Dutch symphonic metal band.

After Forever may refer also to:

- After Forever (album), 2007 album of the namesake band
- "After Forever" (song), 1971 rock song by English band Black Sabbath
- After Ever Happy, 2022 American film, released as After Forever in some countries
