= Remagine =

Studio album by After Forever
- Released: 8 September 2005
- Recorded: December 2004 – April 2005
- Studio: Excess, Rotterdam, Netherlands; Eternia, Reuver, Netherlands; Münd Art, Münster, Germany; Home, Enschede, Netherlands
- Genre: Symphonic metal; progressive metal
- Length: 49:22
- Label: Transmission
- Producer: After Forever

After Forever chronology
Invisible Circles (2004)	Remagine (2005)	Mea Culpa (2006)

After Forever studio albums chronology
Invisible Circles (2004)	Remagine (2005)	After Forever (2007)

Alternative cover
- 2015 reissue

Singles from Remagine
- 1. "Being Everyone" Released: 29 September 2005

Professional ratings
Review scores
Source	Rating
AllMusic	3/5 stars

Remagine is the fourth studio album released by Dutch symphonic metal band After Forever. It was released on 8 September 2005 by Transmission Records and followed the 2004 concept album Invisible Circles. It was the band's first album with keyboardist Joost van den Broek, and their last released under Transmission Records.

Initially, the album was made available in three versions: a regular one, an SACD with three bonus songs in 5.1 surround sound and a special edition with a DVD containing a making-of documentary and a photo gallery. On 24 November 2015, Transmission Records reissued the album as a two-disc set containing the SACD bonus tracks, rare single edits, remixes and previously unreleased studio sessions. Although this edition included liner notes by former guitarist Sander Gommans, former lead singer Floor Jansen took to Instagram to denounce the label, claiming that she had never been made aware of the re-release.

== Track listing ==
All lyrics are written by Floor Jansen, except where noted; all music is composed by After Forever, except where noted

Remagine track listing
No.	Title	Lyrics	Music	Length
1.	"Enter"		Sander Gommans; Joost van den Broek	1:06
2.	"Come"			5:02
3.	"Boundaries Are Open"	Jansen; Bas Maas		3:44
4.	"Living Shields"			4:11
5.	"Being Everyone"			3:37
6.	"Attendance"			3:27
7.	"Free of Doubt"			4:40
8.	"Only Everything"			6:33
9.	"Strong"		Gommans; Van den Broek; Jansen	3:38
10.	"Face Your Demons"			4:57
11.	"No Control"			3:17
12.	"Forever"	Jansen; Maas		5:10
Total length:				49:22

SACD bonus tracks
No.	Title	Lyrics	Music	Length
13.	"Taste the Day"		Gommans; Van den Broek; Jansen	2:54
14.	"Live and Learn"	Jansen; Maas		4:16
15.	"Strong" (piano version)			3:40
Total length:				60:12

2015 reissue – disc one: The Album (bonus tracks)
No.	Title	Length
13.	"Being Everyone" (single version)	3:09
14.	"Taste the Day (Remagine)"	2:55
15.	"Being Everyone" (acoustic version)	3:23
16.	"Face Your Demons" (alternative version featuring Marko Hietala)	4:59
17.	"Live and Learn"	4:24
18.	"Strong" (piano version)	3:41
Total length:		71:55

2015 reissue – disc two: The Sessions
No.	Title	Length
1.	"Enter" (session version)	1:06
2.	"Come" (session version)	5:06
3.	"Being Everyone" (session version)	3:41
4.	"Forever" (session version)	5:21
5.	"Live and Learn (The Key Part 2)" (session version)	4:42
6.	"Boundaries Are Open" (session version)	3:46
7.	"Free of Doubt" (session version)	4:40
8.	"Taste the Day (Remagine)" (session version)	3:00
9.	"Attendance" (session version)	3:26
10.	"Only Everything" (session version)	6:34
11.	"No Control" (session version)	3:17
12.	"Living Shields" (session version)	4:10
13.	"Strong" (session version)	3:40
14.	"Face Your Demons" (session version)	4:57
15.	"Two Sides" (alternative version)	3:17
16.	"Boundaries Are Open" (single version)	3:30
17.	"Attendance" (industrial remix)	3:04
Total length:		67:17

== Personnel ==
After Forever

- Floor Jansen – vocals, soprano choir vocals
- Sander Gommans – electric and acoustic guitars, grunts, engineering, production
- Bas Maas – electric guitars, clean male vocals
- Luuk van Gerven – bass guitar
- Joost van den Broek – synthesizers, piano, orchestra and choir arrangements, engineering, production
- André Borgman – drums

Additional musicians

- Thomas Glöckner, Gregor Dierck, Benjamin Spillner – violins
- Swantje Tessmann, Marisy Stumpf, Thomas Rühl – violas
- Saskia Ogilvie, Jörn Kellerman – cellos
- Rannveig Sif Sigurdardottir – mezzo-soprano
- Amanda Somerville – alto, vocal coach, vocal producer
- Previn Moore – bass, tenor

Production

- Hans Pieters – engineering, production
- Andreas Grotenhoff, Alfred Meinstedt – engineering, production (piano)
- Sascha Paeth, Philip Colodetti – vocal production, engineering, mixing
- Miro, Olaf Reitmeier – engineering (orchestra)
- Peter van 't Riet – mastering

== Charts ==
Chart (2005)	Peak position
Belgian Albums (Ultratop Flanders)	55
Belgian Albums (Ultratop Wallonia)	96
Dutch Albums (Album Top 100)	21
