= ReVamp (album) =

Studio album by ReVamp
- Released: 28 May 2010
- Recorded: Graveland Studio, The Juicy Studio, Excess Studios, Esound Studios, Netherlands, 2009 - 2010
- Genre: Progressive metal; symphonic metal
- Length: 55:44
- Label: Nuclear Blast
- Producer: Joost van den Broek; Arno Krabman; Floor Jansen

ReVamp chronology
ReVamp (2010)	Wild Card (2013)

ReVamp is the self-titled 2010 debut by Dutch progressive metal act ReVamp. The album was released in Sweden and Finland on 26 May 2010, in Germany, Austria, Switzerland, the Netherlands, Belgium, Italy and Spain on the 28 May 2010, and the rest of Europe on 31 May 2010. It was released in United States on 27 July 2010.

The album is the first release by lead singer Floor Jansen since her previous band After Forever's self-titled album of 2007.

== Production ==
In 2008, symphonic metal act After Forever went on a hiatus, and the band officially disbanded in February 2009. Lead singer Floor Jansen posted on her website that while After Forever was on hold (and since then disbanded), she would use this opportunity to start writing music with Jorn Viggo Lofstad (Pagan's Mind, Jørn Lande) for a new musical project. On 16 June 2009, Floor announced through her Myspace site that she has started a new metal band, which has put her project with Jorn Viggo from Pagan's Mind (called Sinh) on hold. On 17 October 2009, Floor Jansen announced via Myspace that the name of her new band was ReVamp. ReVamp contains former After Forever keyboardist Joost van den Broek and guitarist Waldemar Sorychta of Grip Inc., Voodoocult, and Eyes of Eden fame as songwriters and producers. She soon started looking for members to form her new live band, and asked visitors of her website to send in applications for the parts of drummer, guitarist, bassist and keyboard player.

In February 2010, Jansen had signed up for an album deal with Nuclear Blast Records, leading to the release of the self-titled debut album that summer.

== Music description ==
Lead singer Floor Jansen noted on the album: "the music is heavier than some of you might expect. Bombastic; but with heavy riffing. Complex and pounding drums mixed with melancholic strings. Crazy synth-sounds mixed with a beautiful choir. A wall of sound, yet transparent and versatile". Jansen also told fan website FlooRocks.com in an interview that "opera is still in it, but not as much" (referencing the famed opera-grunt-duality of After Forever)

== Reception ==
Professional ratings
Review scores
Source	Rating
Allmusic	3.5/5 stars
About.com	3.5/5 stars
Metal Storm	7/10 stars
Infernal Masquerade	(86/100)
The Metal Forge	9/10 stars
Lords of Metal	(92/100)

Both Alex Henderson of Allmusic and Chad Bowar of About.com reviewed positively the album, remarking how Floor Jansen did not depart from her gothic metal roots and from After Forever's music and how her vocals have "the darkly angelic quality that female goth metal singers are known for but also brings a certain amount of grit and toughness to her new band". Bowar's conclusion is that "although trimming a couple of tracks might have been a wise idea (...) ReVamp should satisfy After Forever loyalists and will appeal to gothic/symphonic metal fans in general". Infernal Masquerade Webzine calls ReVamp "a very impressive first release (...) Something that we completely expected from Floor Jansen, and we hope this band continues to improve in the future". The Metal Forge gives ReVamp nine out of ten stars and claims that "Floor's new creation has a different kind of vibe (from After Forever) that makes her stand out above the rest, and ReVamp is on a one way train to success, never to go back. (...) (The album) offers Floor's convicting vocals, lots of symphonic passages from the keyboards and crunching guitars and drumming that border extreme melodic metal. It may sound a little generic at time, but no one can doubt the power behind the music". On the other hand, Metal Storm review underlines how, despite "Floor's beautiful voice (...), the album lacks the punch" and "is nowhere near to what it could or should be", with the result that "even though it has its moments, it still feels like it's been stitched together of undeveloped and underdeveloped ideas".

== Track listing ==
All music written by Floor Jansen, Joost van den Broek and Waldemar Sorychta, all lyrics by Jansen

1. "Here's My Hell" - 5:12
2. "Head Up High" - 3:32
3. "Sweet Curse" - 4:16
4. "Million" - 4:20
5. "In Sickness 'Till Death Do Us Part - All Goodbyes Are Said" - 3:32
6. "Break" - 4:06
7. "In Sickness 'Till Death Do Us Part - Disdain" - 3:32
8. "In Sickness 'Till Death Do Us Part - Disgraced" - 3:28
9. "Kill Me with Silence" - 3:56
10. "Fast Forward" - 3:57
11. "The Trial of Monsters" - 4:20
12. "Under My Skin" - 4:07
13. "I Lost Myself" - 3:30
14. "No Honey for the Damned" (Bonus Track) - 3:56

== Personnel ==
- Floor Jansen - vocals, executive producer
- Waldemar Sorychta - guitars, bass, engineer
- Arno Krabman - additional guitars and bass, co-producer, engineer, mixing
- Joost van den Broek - keyboards, synths, grand piano, programming, strings and choir arrangements, producer, engineer, mixing
- Koen Herfst - drums

Guest musicians

- George Oosthoek - vocals on "Here's My Hell"
- Russell Allen - vocals on "Sweet Curse"
- Björn "Speed" Strid - vocals on "In Sickness 'Till Death Do Us Part 2: Disdain"

The PA Dam Choir

- Annemieke Klinkenberg-Nuijten - soprano
- Annette Vermulen - alto
- Daan Verlaan - tenor
- Gijs Klunder - baritone

Strings

- Ben Mathot - 1st violin
- Judith van Driel - 2nd violin
- Mark Mulder - viola
- David Faber - cello

== Charts ==
Chart	Peak position
Dutch Albums Chart	58
Greek Albums Chart	26
