= Alloy (Trillium album) =

Studio album by Trillium
- Released: 1 November 2011 (US); 4 November 2011 (Europe)
- Recorded: Gate Studios, Wolfsburg, Germany, Eternia Studios, Reuver, The Netherlands, Stoutstead, Flushing, Michigan, USA
- Genre: Hard rock, heavy metal
- Length: 56:54
- Label: Frontiers
- Producer: Sascha Paeth

Trillium chronology
| Alloy (2011) | Tectonic (2018) |

Professional ratings
Review scores
| Source | Rating |
|---|---|
| Metal Rules | 4.0/5 |
| Rock Hard | 8.0/10 |

Alloy is the debut album by heavy metal act Trillium. It was released in 2011 by the Italian record label Frontiers Records in Europe.

== Track listing ==
| No. | Title | Writer(s) | Length |
|---|---|---|---|
| 1. | "Machine Gun" | Amanda Somerville, Sander Gommans | 5:45 |
| 2. | "Coward" | Somerville, Gommans | 4:20 |
| 3. | "Purge" | Somerville, Sascha Paeth | 4:38 |
| 4. | "Utter Descension" | Somerville, Paeth | 4:19 |
| 5. | "Bow to the Ego" | Somerville, Gommans | 4:55 |
| 6. | "Mistaken" | Somerville, Paeth | 4:41 |
| 7. | "Scream It" (featuring Jørn Lande) | Somerville, Gommans | 5:33 |
| 8. | "Justifiable Casualty" | Somerville, Gommans | 5:36 |
| 9. | "Path of Least Resistance" | Somerville | 4:54 |
| 10. | "Into the Dissonance" (Lunatica cover) | Paeth | 4:14 |
| 11. | "Slow It Down" | Somerville, Michael Rodenberg | 4:32 |
| 12. | "Love Is an Illusion" (bonus track) | Somerville, Mat Sinner, Paeth | 3:27 |

== Personnel ==
- Amanda Somerville – lead & backing vocals, keyboards, engineer
- Sascha Paeth – guitars, bass, keyboards, drums, producer, engineer, mixing
- Sander Gommans – guitars, bass, engineer
- Miro – arrangements, keyboards, engineer
- Olaf Reitmeier – acoustic guitars, engineer
- Robert Hunecke-Rizzo – drums
- Simon Oberender – keyboards, mastering
- Jørn Lande – guest lead vocals on track 7
