= Exordium (EP) =

EP by After Forever
- Released: 17 October 2003
- Recorded: April–June 2003
- Studio: Excess (Rotterdam, Netherlands); Arts Music Recording (Rhoon, Netherlands)
- Genre: Symphonic metal
- Length: 26:33
- Label: Transmission
- Producer: Hans Pieters; After Forever

After Forever chronology
Decipher (2001)	Exordium (2003)	Invisible Circles (2004)

Singles from Exordium
- 1. "My Choice" / "The Evil That Men Do" Released: 2 December 2003

Professional ratings
Review scores
Source	Rating
AllMusic	3.5/5 stars

Exordium is an EP by Dutch symphonic metal band After Forever, released on 17 October 2003. Another version of this album was released in 2004, with a bonus DVD entitled Insights. "The Evil That Men Do" is a cover of the Iron Maiden song, while "One Day I'll Fly Away" is a metal version of a ballad originally sung by Randy Crawford. This is the band's first recording with guitarist Bas Maas, who replaced Mark Jansen. Exordium is the first After Forever album to enter the Dutch Top 100 chart, where it remained for two weeks, peaking at #56.

On 11 November 2016, an expanded remastered edition of Exordium containing previously unreleased studio sessions, single edits and an interview was released to digital download and streaming services. Physically, this edition was released on 2 December as the last disc on a three-disc reissue of the band's third studio album, Invisible Circles.

== Track listing ==
Exordium track listing
No.	Title	Lyrics	Music	Length
1.	"Line of Thoughts" (instrumental)		Sander Gommans	2:15
2.	"Beneath"	Floor Jansen	Gommans; Lando van Gils; Jansen; Luuk van Gerven; André Borgman; Bas Maas	4:52
3.	"My Choice"	Jansen	Gommans; Van Gils; Jansen; Van Gerven; Borgman; Maas	4:53
4.	"Glorifying Means"	Jansen	Gommans; Van Gils; Jansen; Van Gerven; Borgman; Maas	5:00
5.	"The Evil That Men Do" (Iron Maiden cover)	Bruce Dickinson; Steve Harris; Adrian Smith	Dickinson; Harris; Smith	4:50
6.	"One Day I'll Fly Away" (Randy Crawford cover)	Joe Sample; Will Jennings	Sample; Jennings	4:43
Total length:				26:33

2016 reissue bonus tracks (The Album – The Sessions)
No.	Title	Length
7.	"My Choice" (single version)	4:00
8.	"The Evil That Men Do" (single version)	3:18
9.	"My Choice" (acoustic version)	4:00
10.	"Line of Thoughts" (session version)	2:18
11.	"Beneath" (session version)	4:53
12.	"My Choice" (session version)	4:52
13.	"Glorifying Means" (session version)	5:00
14.	"The Evil That Men Do" (session version)	4:50
15.	"One Day I'll Fly Away" (session version)	4:44
Total length:		64:26

2016 reissue digital bonus track
No.	Title	Length
16.	"Interview with Sander Gommans and Floor Jansen"	16:44
Total length:		81:10

== Insights ==
Insights is the name given to the DVD that came with the EP, containing a promotional video for "My Choice", along with a making of and backstage footage of the band in the studio.

=== Main ===
1. "My Choice" (music video) – 4:13
2. Making of "My Choice" – 11:58
3. Credits

=== Special features ===
1. "The Evil That Men Do" (Demo live compilation 2002) – 4:29
2. Studio Recordings Exordium 2003 – 5:54
3. Slide Show
4. Artwork
5. Lyrics
6. Liner Notes

== Personnel ==
After Forever

- Floor Jansen – vocals
- Sander Gommans – guitars, grunts
- Bas Maas – guitars
- Luuk van Gerven – bass
- Lando van Gils – keyboards
- André Borgman – drums

Production

- Hans Pieters – production, engineering
- Dennis Leidelmeijer – engineering
- Sascha Paeth – mixing
- Angelique Wassink – camera operator, screenplay
- Arne Pelgrom – camera operator
- Eric Pelgrom – set design
- Mirko Pelgrom – special effects, video editor
- Hans van Vuuren – executive producer
- Peter van 't Riet – mastering

Additional musicians

- Cees' Kieboom – piano, keyboards, strings and choir arrangements
- Ana Tudor – violin
- Jeanneke Biessen – violin
- Yvonne van de Pol – viola
- Sander van Berkel – violoncello
- Frans Grapperhaus – violoncello
- Yvette Boertje – announcer

Choir

- Caspar De Jonge, Ellen Bakker, Hans Cassa, Marga Okhuizen
