= Floor Jansen =

Dutch singer (born 1981)

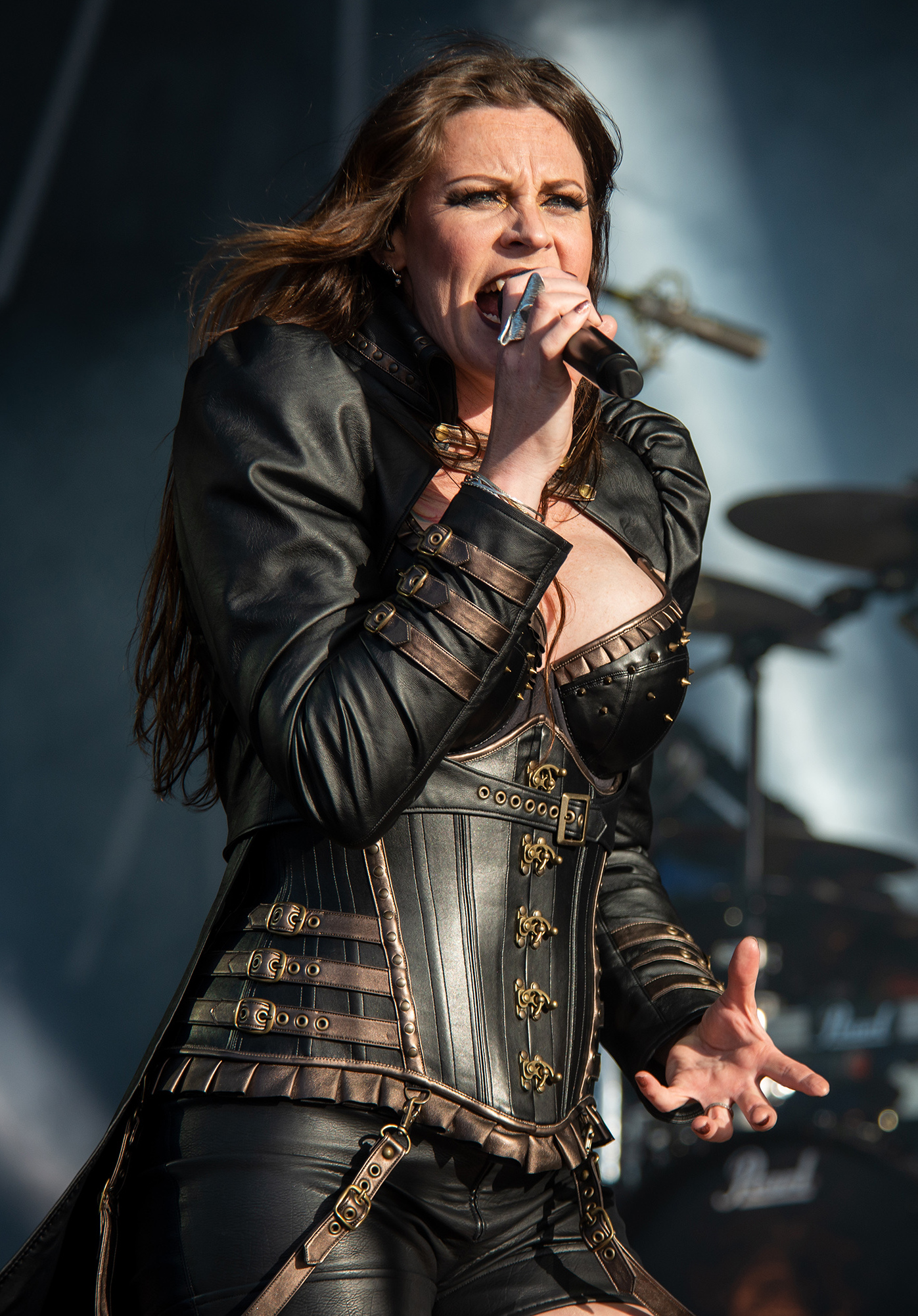
- Jansen live with Nightwish in 2022 at Hellfest

Background information
- Born: 21 February 1981 (age 45)
- Origin: Goirle, North Brabant, Netherlands
- Genres: Symphonic metal; hard rock
- Occupation: Singer
- Years active: 1997–present
- Member of: Northward; Star One
- Formerly of: After Forever; ReVamp; Nightwish
- Spouse: Hannes Van Dahl
- Website: floorjansen.com

Floor Jansen (Dutch: [ˈfloːr ˈjɑnsə(n)]; born 21 February 1981) is a Dutch singer, best known as the former lead vocalist of symphonic metal band Nightwish.

Jansen was the lead vocalist of symphonic metal band After Forever from 1997, when she joined at age 16, to their disbanding in 2009. When the band disbanded, she formed ReVamp and has released two albums with them. In 2012, following the departure of their lead vocalist Anette Olzon, Nightwish brought in Jansen as a touring member until the end of their Imaginaerum World Tour. In 2013, they announced Jansen was now their full-time lead vocalist; she subsequently disbanded ReVamp to focus on Nightwish until her departure from them in October 2026. In 2018, she and Pagan's Mind guitarist Jørn Viggo Lofstad premiered their hard rock duo Northward.

A frequent collaborator of Arjen Anthony Lucassen, Jansen is a member of his progressive metal supergroup Star One, and sang in the Ayreon albums Universal Migrator Part 1: The Dream Sequencer, 01011001, and The Source, as well as the live album Ayreon Universe – The Best of Ayreon Live. She also sang lead vocals in several songs of the MaYan album Quarterpast and in Avalon's Angels of the Apocalypse. She is the older sister of singer Irene Jansen, who also worked with Ayreon.

== Biography ==
=== After Forever (1997–2009) ===
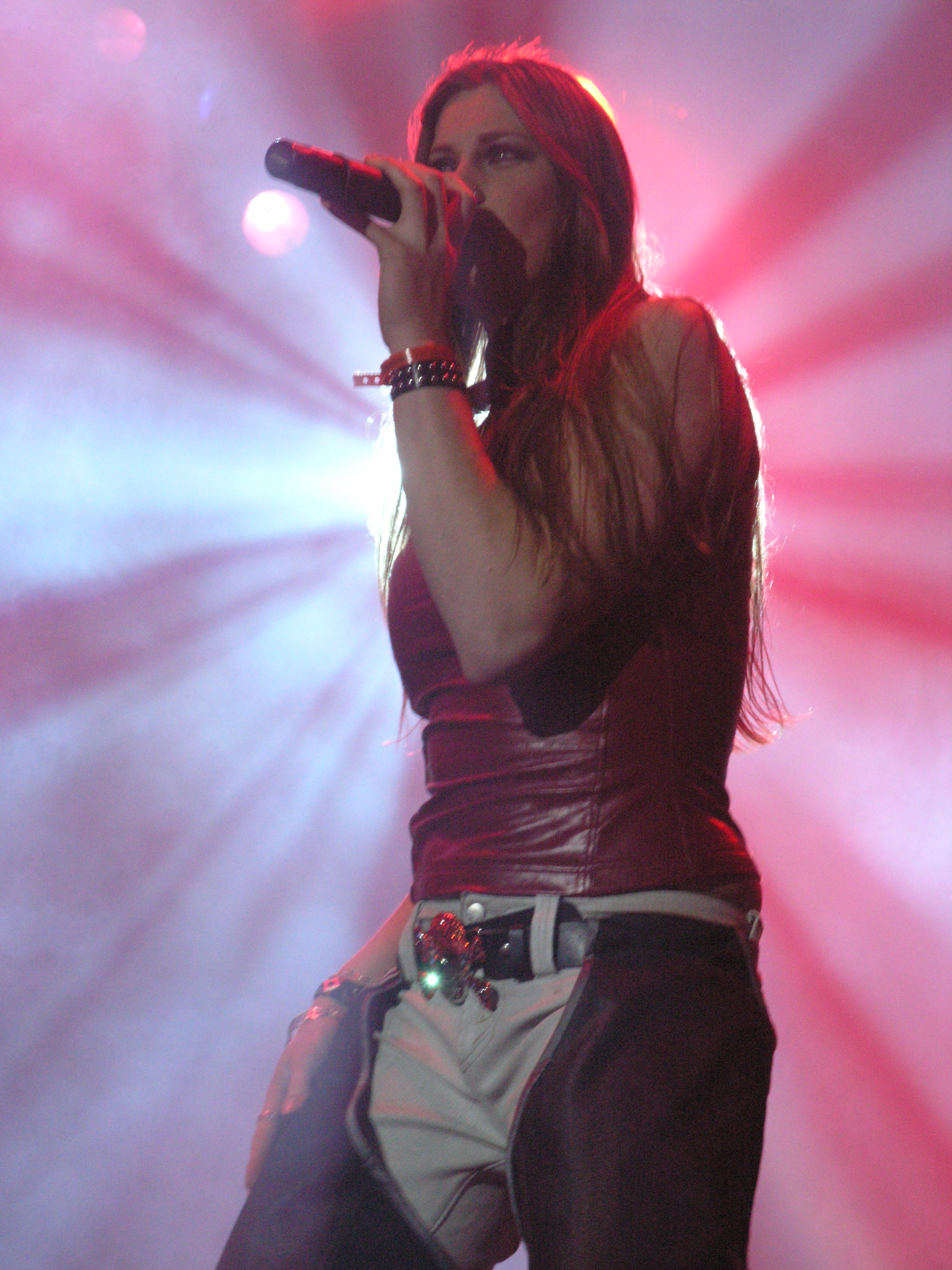
Jansen with After Forever at the Masters of Rock festival in 2007

Jansen was sixteen when she joined Apocalypse (later known as After Forever) in 1997. Three years later the band released its first album, Prison of Desire. She co-wrote the band's words and music with Mark Jansen (no relation) until he left in 2002, after which she was the band's sole composer. Before becoming a full-time musician, she worked as a singing teacher.

Because of the burnout that After Forever bandmate Sander Gommans underwent, the band took a year off starting in January 2008 but ultimately decided to call it quits in February 2009. Jansen posted on her website that she was writing music with Jørn Viggo Lofstad (Pagan's Mind, Jørn Lande) for a new musical project, but the two did not publish as Northward until ten years later.

=== ReVamp (2009–2016) ===
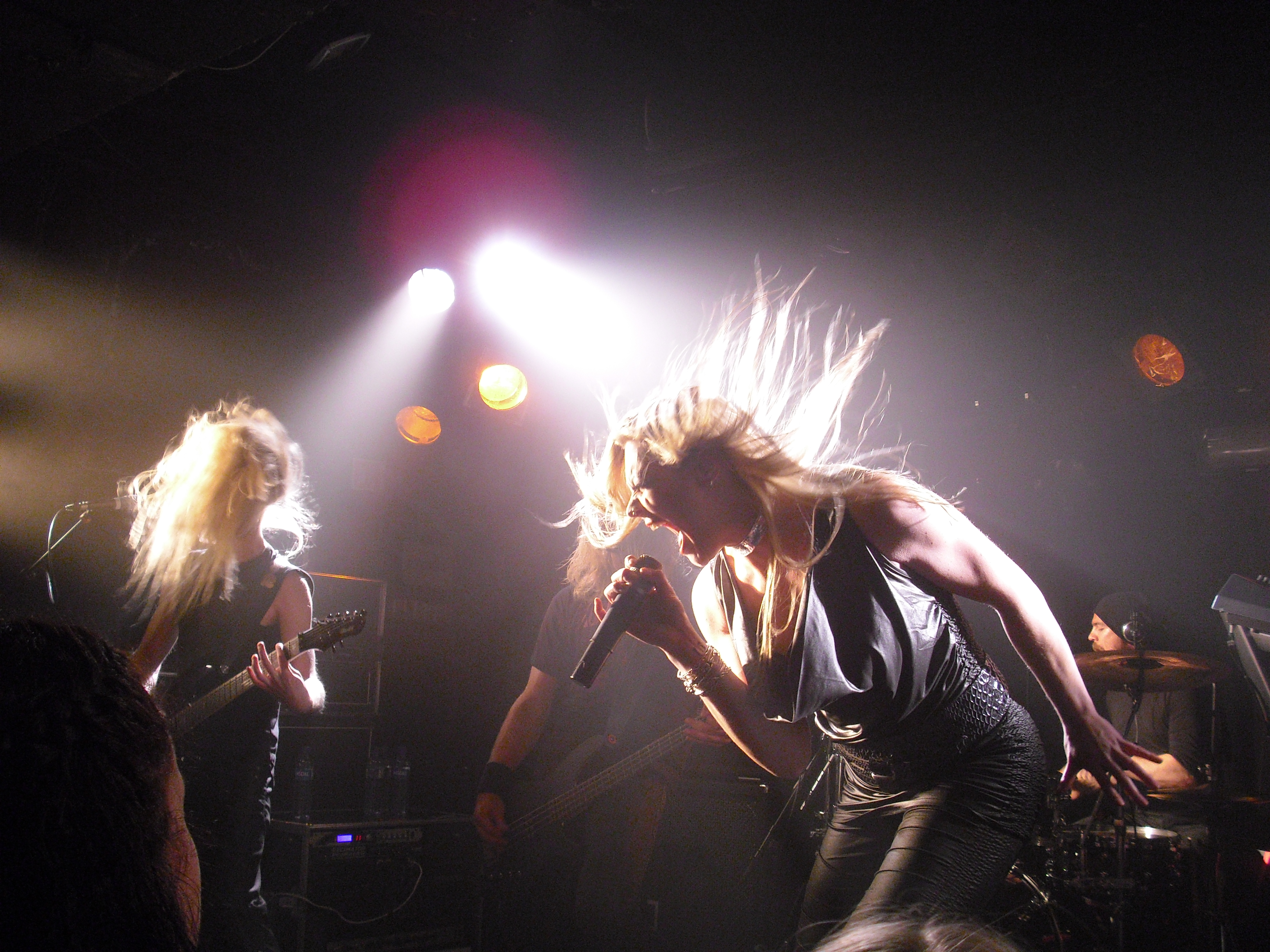
ReVamp performing live in Oslo in September 2010

On 17 October 2009, Jansen announced via MySpace that the name of her new band was ReVamp. ReVamp's first album was produced with After Forever keyboardist Joost van den Broek, bass player Jaap Melman (formerly of Dreadlock Pussy) and guitarist Waldemar Sorychta (Grip Inc., Voodoocult, Eyes of Eden and Despair) as songwriters and producers. The final line-up of ReVamp featured keyboardist Ruben Wijga, bass player Jaap Melman, guitarists Jord Otto and Arjan Rijnen and drummer Matthias Landes.

In August 2011, Van Canto announced on Facebook, that ReVamp would no longer participate in their Out of the Dark tour, as Jansen suffered a burnout herself.

In late 2011, Jansen joined her former bandmate Mark Jansen in his band Mayan's Latin American tour, performing in São Paulo. In 2012, Jansen joined Adrenaline Mob on stage in Bochum and Weert. ReVamp's second album, Wild Card, was released in 2013.

ReVamp announced its breakup in September 2016, citing Floor Jansen's inability to participate fully in both ReVamp and Nightwish.

=== Nightwish (2012–2026) ===
After Nightwish's previous lead vocalist Anette Olzon parted ways with the band, Jansen acted as Nightwish's live lead vocalist for the remainder of the Imaginaerum World Tour in 2012. Her first show with the band was in Seattle in October. When commenting on the experience, she said:

There was this evil voice in my head that said, 'What on earth do you think you're doing? You don't know these songs, you've had no time to learn them'. And everybody in the venue was holding a cell phone, so it would be on YouTube straight away.

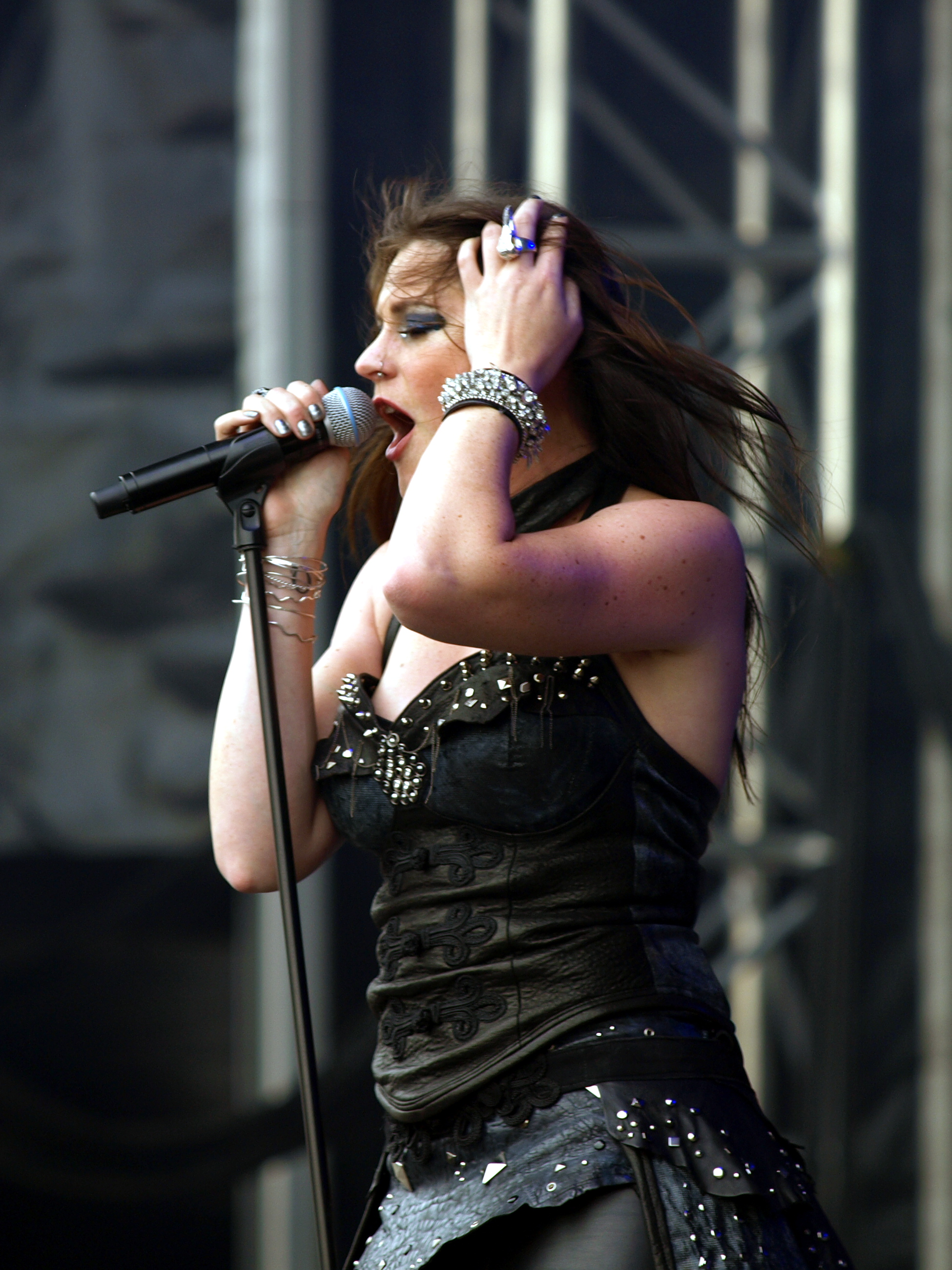
Jansen live with Nightwish in 2013, before being promoted to permanent member later that year

On 9 October 2013, Nightwish announced Jansen as Olzon's permanent replacement in the band. In 2015, Nightwish released their first studio album featuring Jansen as the lead vocalist, which was Endless Forms Most Beautiful. The second studio album with Jansen as lead vocalist, Human. :II: Nature., was released on 10 April 2020. The third studio album with Jansen as lead vocalist, Yesterwynde, was released on 20 September 2024. On 15 October 2026, Jansen announced that she had left Nightwish.

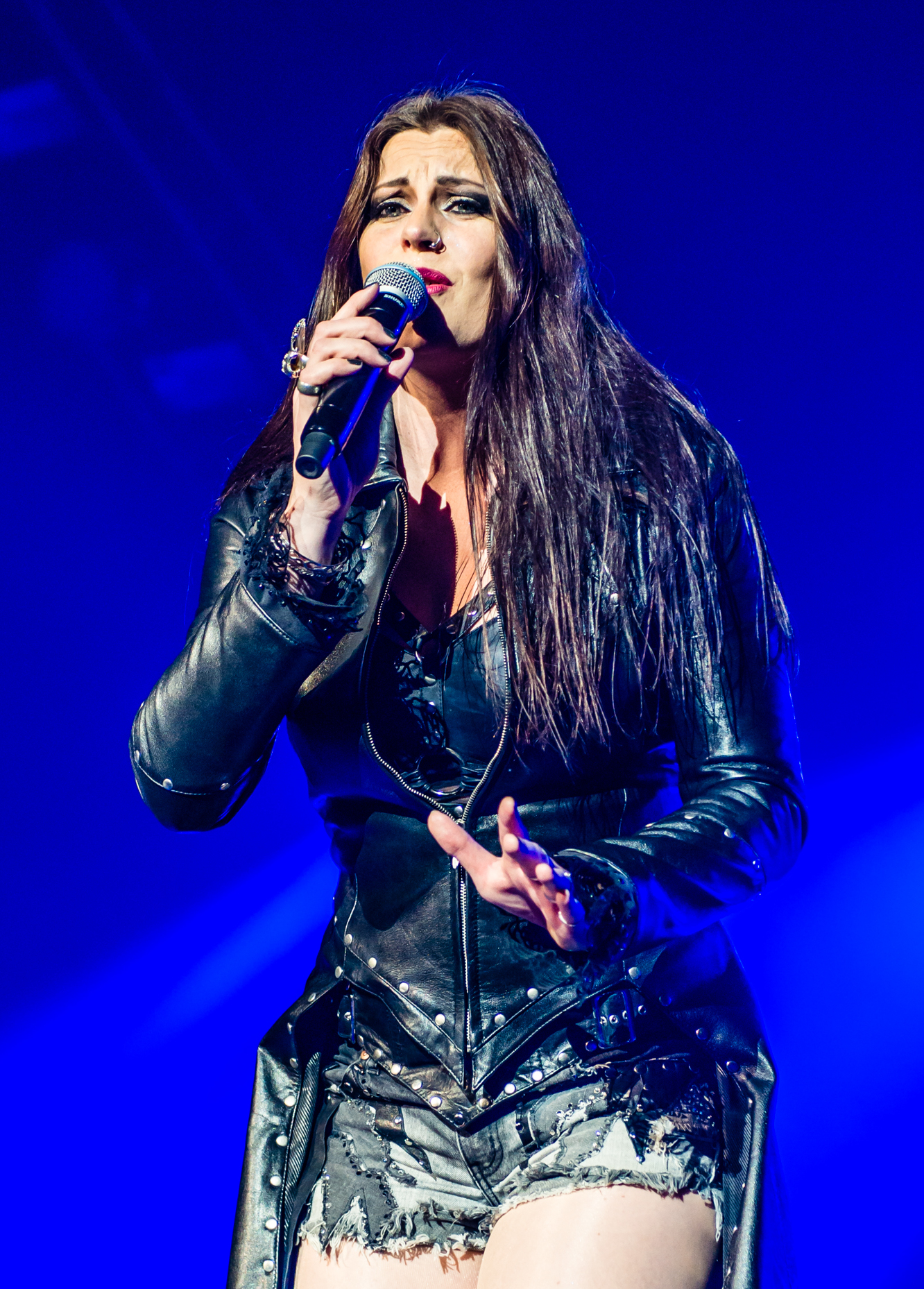
Jansen live with Nightwish in 2015 during the Endless Forms Most Beautiful tour

=== Solo career (2020–present) ===
Jansen performed her first solo concert in January 2020. Due to the restrictions during the COVID-19 pandemic, the final shows of the tour had to be postponed, and finally took place in summer 2021. On 2 August 2021, Jansen had confirmed in an interview that she was working on a solo album. The album has been aimed for a 2023 release. Jansen released her first single "Fire" on 25 March 2022. Her second solo single, "Storm", was released on 27 May 2022. Her third solo single, "Me Without You", was released on 8 September 2022. The fourth solo single called "Invincible" was released on 13 January 2023. The album, called Paragon was released on 24 March 2023.

Jansen was the opening act for Metallica in Amsterdam on 29 April 2023 at the last minute, when American heavy metal band Five Finger Death Punch had canceled their appearance that night.

On 11 May 2025, Jansen confirmed that she was in the process of recording her second solo album.

"Run", the first single from her new solo album, Hytress, was released in June 2026.

=== Other works ===
Three albums by the Dutch composer and multi-instrumentalist Arjen Anthony Lucassen's project Ayreon include guest vocals from Jansen: she sang backing vocals on "My House on Mars" from the album Universal Migrator Part 1: The Dream Sequencer, played the character of Forever, referred to as Ω, (Coincidentally, Jansen used the Ω symbol as an emblem for her band Revamp, and she has the symbol tattooed on her wrist) on seven songs from the album 01011001, and was featured as a character named The Biologist on the album The Source. She is also a member of Lucassen's heavy metal supergroup Star One, and was featured on the studio albums Space Metal and Victims of the Modern Age. She was also featured in the 2018 live album Ayreon Universe – The Best of Ayreon Live.

On 9 December 2013, she was also announced as the main vocalist, playing the lead role, for the second full-length album of former Stratovarius guitarist Timo Tolkki's metal opera act Avalon. The album, Angels of the Apocalypse, was released on 16 May 2014. She has also been a guest for the metal band Nightmare.

On 22 February 2018, Northward, a hard rock project by Jansen and Pagan's Mind guitarist Jørn Viggo Lofstad, was unveiled. The two created the project in 2007, writing an entire album worth of music in 2008 but being unable to record previously due to their busy schedules; they ultimately reunited in 2017 to finally record the album, which was released on 19 October 2018 under their signed label Nuclear Blast. The album features a duet between Jansen and her sister Irene.

In 2019, Jansen participated in the Dutch reality TV show Beste Zangers. In the last episode she partnered with classical singer Henk Poort to perform "The Phantom of the Opera", which was later released as a single. It received a surge of positive media attention and allowed Jansen to go on a sold-out solo tour in the Netherlands. She also won the Popprijs 2019, a prestigious Dutch award for the artist or band with an important contribution to Dutch pop music in the past year. Among her other performances for Beste Zangers was a solo version of "Shallow", and a separate acoustic duet version of the same song with Tim Akkerman. In 2022, she performed in the German version of Beste Zangers: "Sing meinen Song - Das Tauschkonzert".

== Personal life ==
Jansen is vegetarian. As a child, she wanted to be a biologist; coincidentally, she played the character "The Biologist" in the Ayreon album The Source. In 2018, a new species of beetle was discovered by scientist Andreas Weigel and named Tmesisternus floorjansenae after Jansen. Jansen thereby became the second Nightwish member to be a namesake for a newly discovered species, following Tuomas Holopainen, after whom had been named a species of fungus gnat discovered in 2017 by Finnish biologist Jukka Salmela. In 2020, a new species of brittle star, Ophiomitrella floorae of the late Maastrichtian age (c. 66.7 Ma), was named after her.

Jansen is over six feet (1.83 m) tall, and has said that she does not understand people's fascination with her height.

Between 2014 and 2015, Jansen lived in Joensuu, the capital of North Karelia, Finland.

Jansen was previously in a relationship with After Forever guitarist Sander Gommans. On 18 September 2016, it was announced that Jansen and her husband, Sabaton drummer Hannes Van Dahl, were expecting their first child. On 15 March 2017, Jansen announced via Instagram that she had given birth to a girl. On 20 October 2023, she announced the birth of their second daughter.

On 26 October 2022, Jansen announced that she had been diagnosed with breast cancer, undergoing surgery the following day. Two days following the announcement, Jansen confirmed that the surgery had gone well. On 18 November, Jansen announced that she was now cancer free.

== Singing style ==
Jansen can sing from classical to belting and raspy vocals like screaming and death growls. She is a soprano with a range of more than three octaves (C3 to F6).

Jansen started studying music at the Dutch Rock Academy in 1999, entering the Conservatorium Tilburg three years later. She studied musical theatre and a year of opera. When After Forever split up, she started teaching, performing in her own course called Wanna be a Star?!

She used to play the guitar, piano and flute and has completed several years of music studies.

== Discography ==
Studio albums

- Paragon (2023)
- Hytress (2027)

Live albums

- Live in Amsterdam (2022)

=== After Forever ===
Studio albums

- Prison of Desire (2000)
- Decipher (2001)
- Invisible Circles (2004)
- Remagine (2005)
- After Forever (2007)

EPs

- Exordium (2003)

=== Nightwish ===
Studio albums

- Endless Forms Most Beautiful (2015)
- Human. :II: Nature. (2020)
- Yesterwynde (2024)

Live albums

- Showtime, Storytime (2013)
- Vehicle of Spirit (2016)
- Decades: Live in Buenos Aires (2019)

=== Northward ===
Studio albums

- Northward (2018)

=== ReVamp ===
Studio albums

- ReVamp (2010)
- Wild Card (2013)

=== Star One ===
Studio albums

- Space Metal (2002)
- Victims of the Modern Age (2010)
- Revel in Time (2022)

Live albums

- Live on Earth (2003)

== Filmography ==
- Soaring Highs and Brutal Lows: The Voices of Women in Metal (2015)
