= Wild Card (ReVamp album) =

Studio album by ReVamp
- Released: August 23, 2013
- Studio: SandLane Studio in Rijen, The Netherlands
- Genre: Progressive metal; symphonic metal
- Length: 49:06
- Label: Nuclear Blast
- Producer: Joost van den Broek

ReVamp chronology
ReVamp (2010)	Wild Card (2013)

Professional ratings
Review scores
Source	Rating
About.com	4/5 stars

Wild Card is the second and final album by the Dutch progressive metal band ReVamp. The album was released on 23 August 2013 in Europe, on 26 August in the UK and on 3 September 2013 in the USA.

== Track listing ==
All tracks written by Floor Jansen, Jord Otto, Ruben Wijga, and Joost van den Broek.

1. "'The Anatomy of a Nervous Breakdown': On the Sideline" – 3:45
2. "'The Anatomy of a Nervous Breakdown': The Limbic System" – 4:54
3. "Wild Card" – 4:21
4. "Precibus" – 4:24
5. "Nothing" – 3:53
6. "'The Anatomy of a Nervous Breakdown': Neurasthenia" – 5:06
7. "Distorted Lullabies" – 4:58
8. "Amendatory" – 4:47
9. "I Can Become" – 3:48
10. "Misery's No Crime" – 4:03
11. "Wolf and Dog" – 5:01
12. "Sins" (bonus track) – 4:05
13. "Infringe" (bonus track) – 4:53

== Personnel ==
Band members

- Floor Jansen – vocals, grunts (except on track 10)
- Arjan Rijnen – guitars
- Jord Otto – guitars
- Ruben Wijga – keyboards
- Matthias Landes – drums

Guest musicians

- Johan van Stratum – bass
- Mark Jansen – grunts on track 10
- Devin Townsend – vocals on track 6
- Marcela Bovio, Daniël de Jongh – choir vocals

== Charts ==
Chart	Peak position
Dutch Albums Chart	43
Finnish Albums Chart	21
UK Rock Chart	31
Belgian Albums Chart (Wallonia)	130
Belgian Albums Chart (Flanders)	97
