= After Forever =

Dutch metal band

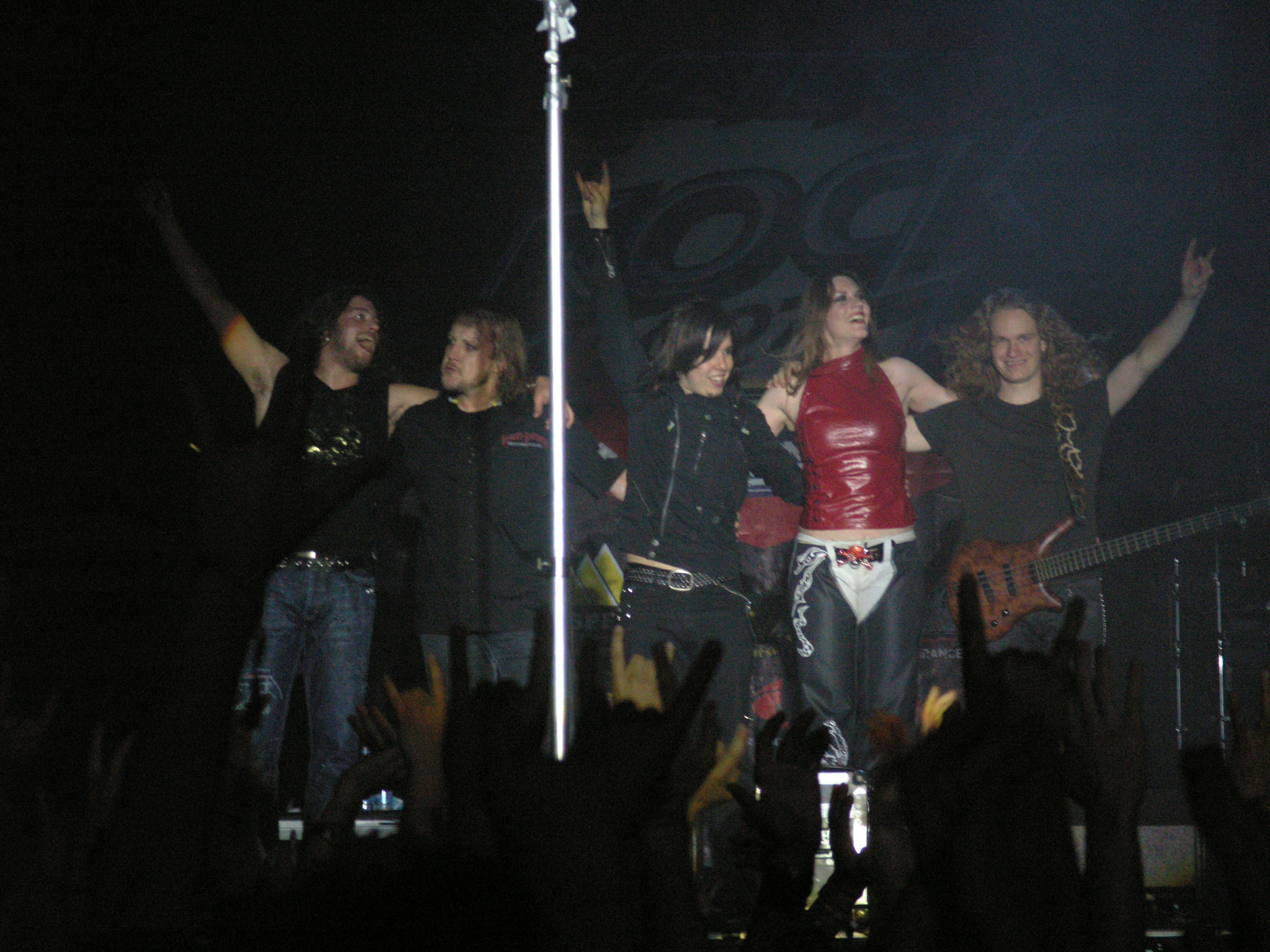
- After Forever live at the Masters of Rock festival in 2007

Background information
- Also known as: Apocalypse (1995–1997)
- Origin: North Brabant, Netherlands
- Genres: Symphonic metal; gothic metal; progressive metal
- Years active: 1995–2009; 2025
- Labels: Transmission; Nuclear Blast
- Spinoffs: MaYaN; ReVamp
- Past members: Sander Gommans; Mark Jansen; Joep Beckers; Jack Driessen; Luuk van Gerven; Floor Jansen; André Borgman; Lando van Gils; Bas Maas; Joost van den Broek; Jeffrey Revet; Angel Wolf-Black
- Website: www.afterforever.com

After Forever was a Dutch symphonic metal band with strong progressive metal influences. Originally formed as a death metal band in 1995 by Mark Jansen and Sander Gommans under the name Apocalypse, they later shifted their sound towards symphonic metal with the introduction of Floor Jansen to the band.

The band's signature sound relied heavily on the combination of Floor Jansen's soprano vocals and death growls, often provided by Mark Jansen and Sander Gommans. After Forever also commonly incorporated symphonic elements into their studio albums, being known for their contributions to the symphonic metal genre alongside Nightwish, Within Temptation, and Epica.

In February 2009, it was announced that After Forever had disbanded. Singer Floor Jansen and keyboardist Joost van den Broek collaborated again in ReVamp and Star One, before Jansen eventually joined Nightwish as lead singer in 2013. Former rhythm guitarist Mark Jansen founded Epica soon after his departure from After Forever in 2002, and in 2010 founded MaYaN, which included former After Forever members Sander Gommans and Jack Driessen. Floor Jansen has appeared as a session or live vocalist for Epica and MaYaN.

== History ==
=== First years and Prison Of Desire (1995–2000) ===
After Forever was originally assembled in 1995, under the name Apocalypse. They were originally a gothic metal cover band with harsh male vocals. With the joining of vocalist Floor Jansen in 1997, their style and sound shifted towards symphonic gothic metal, in order to give emphasis to her soprano voice, in contrast with the grunts and screams provided by Sander Gommans and Mark Jansen. Their line-up at this point comprised Floor Jansen, Mark Jansen (no relation to Floor), Sander Gommans, Luuk van Gerven, Jack Driessen and Joep Beckers. Soon, the band began composing their own songs, and then they changed their name to After Forever, after the Black Sabbath song. In 1999, the band recorded two demos, Ephemeral and Wings of Illusion, drawing the attention of the Dutch Transmission Records label, with whom the band signed a contract.

Their 2000 debut album Prison of Desire features a guest appearance by Sharon den Adel of the Dutch band Within Temptation on the song "Beyond Me". The album received positive reviews in Europe. By the end of the year, drummer André Borgman and keyboardist Lando van Gils joined the band, replacing Joep Beckers and Jack Driessen.

Also in 2000, Floor Jansen provided vocals on Ayreon's Universal Migrator Part 1: The Dream Sequencer album.

=== Decipher and departure of Mark Jansen (2001–2002) ===
In 2001, the band released Decipher, which featured live classical instruments and a live choir.

By the end of 2001, After Forever appeared as rising stars on the dynamic scene of Dutch metal, which included bands like The Gathering, Within Temptation, Gorefest and Ayreon. Their second album Decipher (2001) had received very positive reviews and their name was well known in the underground scene of the Netherlands. Critics were impressed by the remarkable musicianship of the young members of the band and in particular by Floor Jansen's vocals, both in studio and in live performances. In contrast with these premises for a bright future, the relationships within the band were not so idyllic. Soon after the release of Decipher, After Forever faced a strong creative contrast between founding member and guitarist Mark Jansen and the rest of the band. Mark Jansen had been the main composer of the band together with Sander Gommans and his love for movie soundtracks and classical music had had a strong influence on the musical style of After Forever's first two albums, Prison of Desire (2000) and Decipher. Moreover, his interest for religious and moral themes had characterized his lyrics for many songs, often collected under a common title (e.g. The Embrace That Smothers and My Pledge of Allegiance). In the next album, Mark Jansen meant to further explore complex interactions between classical instruments, choruses in Latin and death metal elements, while Gommans and the others preferred a more direct and aggressive approach to music, retaining some elements that made the sound of the band recognizable, but expanding it in new and different directions. These musical differences led to Mark Jansen leaving the band, in what he felt as an actual dismissal. Upon his departure, Jansen quickly formed another band called Sahara Dust, which later developed into the symphonic metal band Epica. In a 2007 interview, Jansen described his departure from After Forever as coming as a shock to him at the time, with the news of his dismissal being delivered to him by fellow band members shortly before a band rehearsal. At the time of his dismissal, the band were preparing to participate in a series of major tours and concerts such as Pinkpop.

Jansen's place was taken by Bas Maas, who had been the guitar technician for After Forever during the tours of 2001 and 2002. August and September 2002 were dedicated to a European tour, supporting Finnish act Nightwish (whom Floor Jansen would become the lead vocalist of in 2013) and attending some rock festivals, which exposed the band to larger audiences and gained them even more favourable press. Further media exposure came from Floor Jansen's collaboration with Dutch multi-instrumentalist and composer Arjen Anthony Lucassen, for the recording of Star One's album Space Metal and the subsequent tour in late 2002.

=== Exordium and Invisible Circles (2003–2004) ===
Floor Jansen's activities, as well as the regular jobs and studies of the After Forever band members, reduced the band's live performances for the rest of 2002 and half of 2003. It was known that the band was working at a new album from the beginning of 2003, but their first release was the EP Exordium in October 2003, containing an instrumental track, three new songs and two covers. In Jansen's words "the EP Exordium was like an introduction to this new full length album and the subjects of the lyrics are already connected to the concept (...) meaning they are also dealing with modern, social problems".

In 2004, the concept album Invisible Circles was released. The album, that deals with childhood traumas and abuse, introduced progressive metal elements to the music of After Forever and the use of a clean male voice. The album reached No. 24 in the Dutch Top 100 musical chart. In the same year, Lando van Gils also left the band and was replaced by Joost van den Broek, a keyboard player that Floor Jansen had met during her tour with Star One, another project by Arjen Lucassen.

=== Remagine and signing to Nuclear Blast (2005–2006) ===
In early September 2005, the band released their fourth album Remagine. The album was produced using pre-recorded drum tracks by André Borgman, who had to take a long leave of absence to cure his illness. The songs of the album are simpler and more straightforward than in the previous albums, preserving anyway the usual dual voice dynamic in the sound of the band.

On 3 March 2006 the band left the Transmission Records label, due to the scarce promotion that the label was providing to their albums. Following this departure, Transmission Records released the Mea Culpa compilation, with plenty of rarities and B-sides. By October the same year, After Forever had signed to the German label Nuclear Blast Records.

=== After Forever, hiatus and disbandment (2007–2009) ===
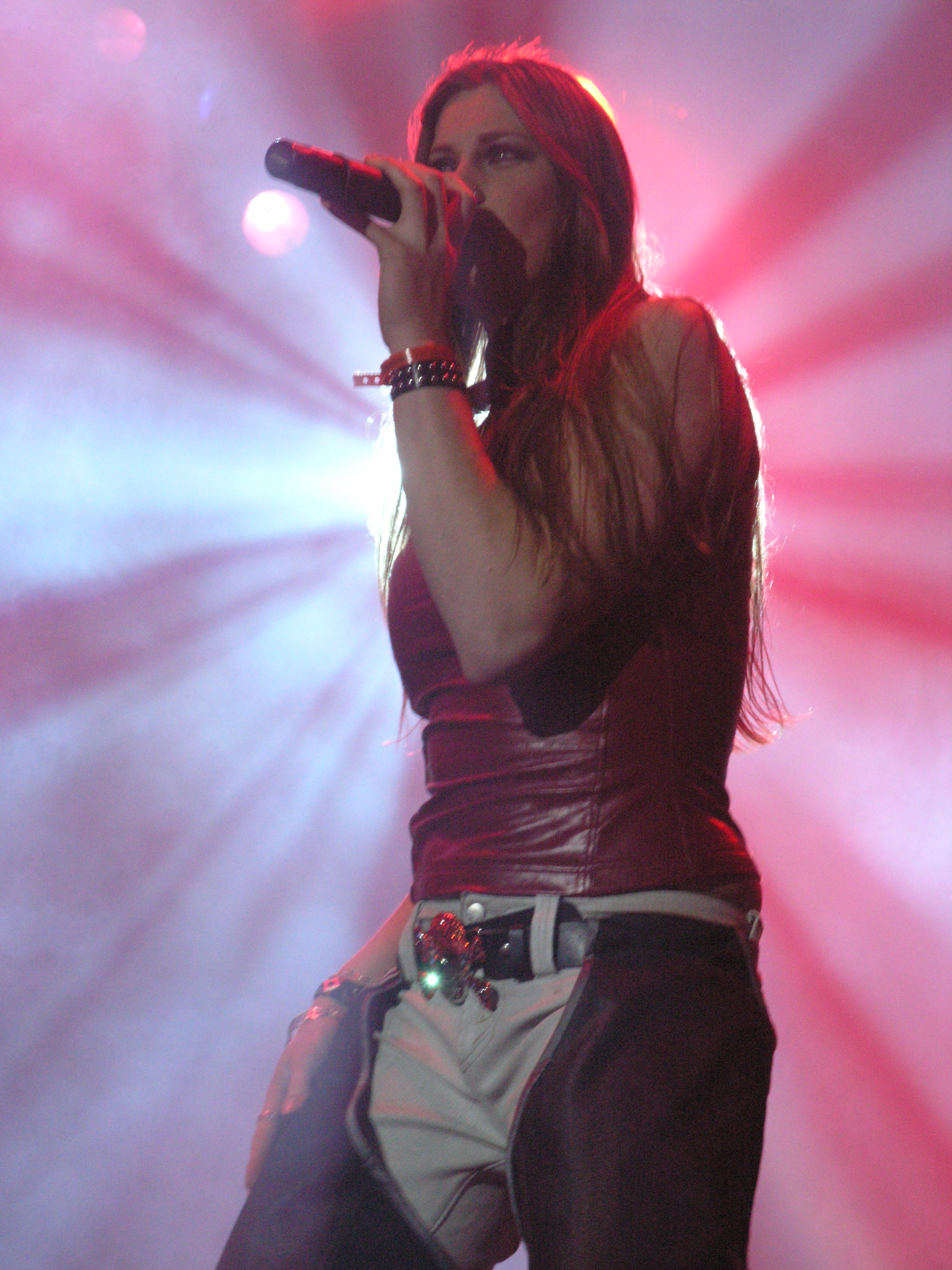
Floor Jansen during After Forever concert on Masters of Rock 2007 festival in Zlín.

In late 2006 the band recorded what would be their final album, as well as their only album to be released through Nuclear Blast, the self-titled After Forever. It features guest appearances from Annihilator guitarist Jeff Waters and Doro Pesch. Videos of the recording sessions were available for download on the band's website. The album was released on 23 April 2007.

In January 2008, After Forever announced on their website, that the band would be taking a break of at least a year, mainly to assess the health problems of vocalist and guitarist Sander Gommans, who had been absent during most of the tour supporting the album After Forever. In an interview with Ragnarök radio, Floor said the band would get together early 2009 to discuss After Forever's future.

On 5 February 2009, After Forever announced that they decided to call it quits. The long break, during 2008 and 2009, had made them realize that they did not feel the passion towards the band any longer.

=== Subsequent activities (2009–2017) ===
After the split up of the band, Sander Gommans released the album System Overload in 2009 with his solo project HDK, followed by Serenades of the Netherworld in 2014. He also created Magic-O-Metal, a metal/comic project for children, and works as a high school art teacher.

Floor Jansen started a new band called ReVamp, which got signed by Nuclear Blast and released the albums ReVamp in 2010 and Wild Card in 2013. The band was on hold for a while after the release of ReVamp because of Jansen's health problems and her subsequent recruitment as the new lead singer for Nightwish. Jansen's involvement with Nightwish ultimately caused ReVamp to call it quits.

Joost van den Broek collaborated with both Gommans and Jansen on their new musical projects, while also leading several symphonic/crossover projects, particularly the Christmas Metal Symphony shows in 2008 and 2009 and Stream of Passion's second album The Flame Within. He has since focused mostly on composing and studio work, but sporadically performs live, mainly as a session member of Ayreon and The Gentle Storm.

Bas Maas joined the live band supporting German hard rock singer Doro Pesch in 2008.

Both André Borgman and Luuk van Gerven joined Robby Valentine's live band while After Forever was on hiatus. Borgman also joined Amanda Somerville's band Trillium in 2017, thereby reuniting with his former bandmate Sander Gommans.

=== Reunion (2025) ===
On 4 and 5 October 2025, the band performed two shows in celebration of the 25th anniversary of their first album. The line-up during these two shows consisted of Sander Gommans, Bas Maas, Luuk van Gerven, Ariën van Weesenbeek, Mark Jansen, Jeffrey Revet and Angel Wolf-Black. This reunited the band's Prison of Desire era lineup, plus the addition of Maas (who replaced Jansen after his firing), and with keyboardist Lando van Gils and lead vocalist Floor Jansen being replaced by Jeffrey Revet and Angel Wolf-Black, respectively.

== Band members ==
Final line-up

- Sander Gommans – bass guitar (1995–1996), lead guitar, screamed vocals (1995–2009, 2025)
- Mark Jansen – rhythm guitar, screamed vocals (1995–2002, 2025)
- Luuk van Gerven – bass guitar (1996–2009, 2025)
- Ariën van Weesenbeek – drums, percussion (2025)
- Bas Maas – rhythm guitar, clean vocals (2002–2009, 2025)
- Jeffrey Revet – keyboards (2025)
- Angel Wolf-Black – lead vocals (2025)

Former

- Joep Beckers – drums, percussion (1995–2000)
- Jack Driessen – keyboards (1995–2000)
- Floor Jansen – lead vocals (1997–2009)
- Lando van Gils – keyboards (2000–2004)
- André Borgman – drums, percussion (2000–2009)
- Joost van den Broek – keyboards (2004–2009)

== Discography ==
=== Studio albums ===
Title	Album details	Peak chart positions					
Title	Album details	NLD	GER	FRA	BEL (FL)	BEL (WA)	JPN
Prison of Desire	Released: 24 April 2000; Re-release: 5 June 2008; Label: Transmission; Formats: CD	—	—	—	—	—	—
Decipher	Released: 27 December 2001; Re-release: 3 December 2011; Label: Transmission; Formats: CD, LP	—	—	—	—	—	—
Invisible Circles	Released: 25 March 2004; Re-release: 11 November 2016; Label: Transmission; Formats: CD	24	—	—	74	—	272
Remagine	Released: 8 September 2005; Re-release: 21 November 2015; Label: Transmission; Formats: CD, SACD, CD+DVD	21	—	—	55	96	—
After Forever	Released: 20 April 2007; Label: Nuclear Blast; Formats: CD, CD+DVD, LP, digital download	6	98	105	89	72	234
"—" denotes a recording that did not chart or was not released in that territory.

=== Compilation albums ===
Title	Album details	Peak chart positions
Title	Album details	NLD
Mea Culpa	Released: 19 June 2006; Label: Transmission; Formats: CD	69
Eccentric	Released: 8 November 2019; Label: Transmission; Formats: Digital download, streaming	—
"—" denotes a recording that did not chart or was not released in that territory.

=== EPs ===
Title	Album details	Peak chart positions
Title	Album details	NLD
Exordium	Released: 17 October 2003; Re-release: 11 November 2016; Label: Transmission; Formats: CD	56
"—" denotes a recording that did not chart or was not released in that territory.

=== Singles ===
Year	Title	Peak chart positions	Album
Year	Title	NLD	Album
2000	"Follow in the Cry" / "Silence from Afar"	—	Prison of Desire
2002	"Emphasis" / "Who Wants to Live Forever"	—	Decipher
2002	"Monolith of Doubt"	—	Decipher
2003	"My Choice" / "The Evil That Men Do"	—	Exordium
2004	"Digital Deceit"	41	Invisible Circles
2005	"Being Everyone"	54	Remagine
2006	"Two Sides" / "Boundaries Are Open"	—	Mea Culpa
2007	"Energize Me"	94	After Forever
2007	"Equally Destructive" (DVD single)	89	After Forever
"—" denotes a recording that did not chart or was not released in that territory.

=== Music videos ===
- "Emphasis" (2002)
- "My Choice" (2003)
- "Digital Deceit" (2004)
- "Being Everyone" (2005)
- "Energize Me" (2007)
- "Equally Destructive" (2007)
- "Discord" (2007)

=== Demos ===
Title	Demo details
Ephemeral	Released: 1999; Label: Self-released; Formats: CD
Wings of Illusion	Released: 1999; Label: Self-released; Formats: CD

== Interviews ==
- Interview of Floor Jansen (August 2007)
- Ragnarok Radio Interview with Floor Jansen and Lori Linstruth (December 2008)
