= After Forever (album) =

Studio album by After Forever
- Released: 20 April 2007
- Recorded: September–November 2006
- Studio: Rooftop, Holten, Netherlands; Eternia, Reuver, Netherlands; E-Sound, Weesp, Netherlands; JB, Enschede, Netherlands; Barrandov, Prague, Czech Republic; Smecky, Prague
- Genre: Symphonic metal; progressive metal
- Length: 57:58
- Label: Nuclear Blast
- Producer: Gordon Groothedde

After Forever chronology
Mea Culpa (2006)	After Forever (2007)	Eccentric (2019)

After Forever studio albums chronology
Remagine (2005)	After Forever (2007)

Singles from After Forever
- 1. "Energize Me" Released: 23 March 2007; 2. "Equally Destructive" Released: 21 September 2007

Professional ratings
Review scores
Source	Rating
AllMusic	3.5/5 stars
Metal Forces	8/10
Metal Storm	9/10 stars
Metal Crypt	5/5 stars

After Forever is the fifth and final studio album by Dutch symphonic metal band After Forever. It was released in the United States on 28 September 2007 under Nuclear Blast Records, their first album with the label. The album reached No. 6 on the Dutch album charts.

A 15th anniversary edition, with remastered songs and both previously released bonus tracks "Lonely" and "Sweet Enclosure", was released on 27 May 2022.

== Track listing ==
All lyrics are written by Floor Jansen; all music is composed by Sander Gommans, Joost van den Broek and After Forever, except where noted.

After Forever track listing
No.	Title	Music	Length
1.	"Discord"		4:37
2.	"Evoke"		4:24
3.	"Transitory"		3:29
4.	"Energize Me"	Gommans; Van den Broek; Gordon Groothedde; After Forever	3:10
5.	"Equally Destructive"		3:32
6.	"Withering Time"		4:32
7.	"De-Energized"		5:10
8.	"Cry with a Smile"		4:25
9.	"Envision"	Gommans; Van den Broek; Groothedde; After Forever	3:57
10.	"Who I Am"		4:36
11.	"Dreamflight"		11:10
12.	"Empty Memories"		4:56
Total length:			57:58

Limited edition bonus track
No.	Title	Length
13.	"Lonely"	3:24
Total length:		61:22

Japanese bonus tracks
No.	Title	Length
13.	"Lonely"	3:24
14.	"Sweet Enclosure"	5:03
Total length:		66:25

=== Bonus DVD (US limited edition) ===
1. "Discord" (music video)
2. "Equally Destructive" (music video)
3. "Energize Me" (music video)
4. Photo Gallery

== Personnel ==
After Forever

- Floor Jansen – vocals, soprano choir vocals
- Sander Gommans – guitars, grunts
- Bas Maas – guitars
- Luuk van Gerven – bass guitar
- Joost van den Broek – keyboards, orchestral and choral arrangements, engineering
- André Borgman – drums

Additional musicians

- Rannveig Sif Sigurdardottir – mezzo-soprano choir vocals
- Amanda Somerville – alto choir vocals
- Previn Moore – tenor and baritone choir vocals
- Jeff Waters – guitar solo on "De-Energized"
- Doro Pesch – vocals on "Who I Am"
- City of Prague Philharmonic Orchestra – orchestra
- Richard Hein – orchestra conductor

Production

- Gordon Groothedde – production, engineering, mixing
- Stephanie Pistel – photography
- Thomas Ewerhard – artwork, layout

== Charts ==
Year	Chart	Position
2007	Dutch Albums Chart	6
2007	Ultratop Belgian Charts (Wallonia)	72
2007	Ultratop Belgian Charts (Flanders)	89
2007	German Albums Chart	98
2007	French Albums Chart	105
