= Prison of Desire =

Studio album by After Forever
- Released: 21 April 2000
- Recorded: 17 December 1999 – 26 February 2000
- Studios: Excess (Rotterdam, Netherlands); RS29 (Waalwijk, Netherlands)
- Genres: Symphonic metal; gothic metal
- Length: 54:05
- Label: Transmission
- Producers: Hans Pieters; Dennis Leidelmeijer

After Forever chronology
Wings of Illusion (1999)	Prison of Desire (2000)	Decipher (2001)

Singles from Prison of Desire
- 1. "Follow in the Cry" / "Silence from Afar" Released: 2000

Professional ratings
Review scores
Source	Rating
AllMusic	3/5 stars
Chronicles of Chaos	7.5/10 stars

Prison of Desire is the debut album by Dutch symphonic metal band After Forever. It was released on 21 April 2000 by Transmission Records. The album contains the first four installments (three parts and a prologue) of The Embrace That Smothers, a collection of songs by Mark Jansen which deals with the influence and distortion of religion in human society. This theme was carried over to the Epica albums The Phantom Agony and The Divine Conspiracy.

The final track, "Beyond Me", features a guest appearance of Sharon den Adel, lead singer in Within Temptation.

The album was reissued in June 2008 by the re-financed Transmission Records, as a two-disc set containing previously unreleased studio sessions, instrumental/a cappella tracks, and a handful of demo recordings. Guitarist Sander Gommans has urged fans not to buy this re-release through the band's official forum.

In 2021, it was elected by Metal Hammer as the 6th best symphonic metal album of all time.

== Track listing ==
All music is composed by Mark Jansen, Sander Gommans and Floor Jansen, except "Mea Culpa" by M. Jansen.

Prison of Desire track listing
No.	Title	Lyrics	Length
1.	"Mea Culpa (The Embrace That Smothers - Prologue)"	M. Jansen	2:00
2.	"Leaden Legacy (The Embrace That Smothers - Part I)"	M. Jansen	5:07
3.	"Semblance of Confusion"	F. Jansen	4:09
4.	"Black Tomb"	F. Jansen	6:29
5.	"Follow in the Cry (The Embrace That Smothers - Part II)"	M. Jansen	4:06
6.	"Silence from Afar"	M. Jansen	5:52
7.	"Inimical Chimera"	F. Jansen	5:00
8.	"Tortuous Threnody"	F. Jansen	6:13
9.	"Yield to Temptation (The Embrace That Smothers - Part III)"	M. Jansen	5:53
10.	"Ephemeral"	M. Jansen	3:05
11.	"Beyond Me" (duet with Sharon den Adel)	F. Jansen; M. Jansen	6:11
Total length:			54:05

Japanese bonus track
No.	Title	Lyrics	Length
12.	"Wings of Illusion"	F. Jansen	7:21
Total length:			61:26

Red digipack limited edition bonus track
No.	Title	Length
12.	"Leaden Legacy" (instrumental version)	5:10
Total length:		59:15

Mexican bonus track
No.	Title	Length
12.	"Silence from Afar" (radio edit)	4:38
Total length:		58:43

2007 Japanese Collector's Edition bonus tracks
No.	Title	Length
12.	"Wings of Illusion"	7:21
13.	"Silence from Afar" (demo)	5:59
14.	"Wings of Illusion" (demo)	7:28
Total length:		74:48

2008 reissue – disc one: The Album (bonus tracks)
No.	Title	Length
12.	"Wings of Illusion"	7:22
13.	"Mea Culpa" (instrumental version)	2:01
14.	"Mea Culpa" (a cappella version)	1:50
15.	"Semblance of Confusion" (instrumental version)	4:07
16.	"Follow in the Cry" (instrumental version)	4:05
17.	"Follow in the Cry" (a cappella version)	1:20
Total length:		74:55

2008 reissue – disc two: The Sessions
No.	Title	Length
1.	"Silence from Afar" (demo version)	5:55
2.	"Wings of Illusion" (demo version)	7:21
3.	"Follow in the Cry" (session version)	4:04
4.	"Yield to Temptation" (session version)	5:51
5.	"Semblance of Confusion" (session version)	4:06
6.	"Beyond Me" (session version)	6:13
7.	"Black Tomb" (session version)	6:29
8.	"Tortuous Threnody" (session version)	6:10
9.	"Ephemeral" (session version)	3:03
10.	"Inimical Chimera" (session version)	4:58
11.	"Silence from Afar" (session version)	5:50
12.	"Mea Culpa" (session version)	2:01
13.	"Leaden Legacy" (session version)	5:04
14.	"Wings of Illusion" (session version)	7:21
Total length:		74:26

== Personnel ==
After Forever

- Floor Jansen – vocals
- Mark Jansen – guitar, grunts
- Sander Gommans – guitar, grunts
- Jack Driessen – keyboards
- Luuk van Gerven – bass guitar
- Joep Beckers – drums

Additional musician

- Sharon den Adel – vocals on "Beyond Me"

Choir

- Hans Cassa, Caspar de Jonge, Yvonne Rooda and Melissa 't Hart

Production

- Hans Pieters – engineering
- Dennis Leidelmeijer – engineering
- Oscar Holleman – choir producer, engineering, mixing
- Hans van Vuuren – executive producer, coordination and research
- Peter van 't Riet – mastering
