= Decipher (After Forever album) =

Studio album by After Forever
- Released: 27 December 2001
- Recorded: June–September 2001
- Studio: RS29 (Waalwijk, Netherlands)
- Genre: Symphonic metal; gothic metal
- Length: 54:35
- Label: Transmission
- Producer: Stephen van Haestregt

After Forever chronology
Prison of Desire (2000)	Decipher (2001)	Exordium (2003)

Singles from Decipher
- 1. "Emphasis" / "Who Wants to Live Forever" Released: 4 April 2002; 2. "Monolith of Doubt" Released: 2002

Professional ratings
Review scores
Source	Rating
AllMusic	4.5/5 stars
Lords of Metal	96/100
Metal Hammer (GER)	6/7 stars
Metal Storm	9/10 stars

Decipher is the second album by Dutch symphonic metal band After Forever, released on 27 December 2001. In this album, the band make use of live classical instruments and a complete choir to back up the soprano voice of lead singer Floor Jansen. Thrown in the mix are also a duet of soprano and tenor voices in "Imperfect Tenses" and the recording of the late Israeli PM Yizhak Rabin's voice during the 1994 Israel–Jordan peace treaty signing ceremony in "Forlorn Hope". This is the last After Forever album with guitarist and founder Mark Jansen, who left the band soon after its release.

In 2003, the album was reissued in a limited edition of 5,000 copies worldwide. The limited edition in digipack had an extended booklet, a sticker with new artwork and two live bonus tracks. It was again reissued in 2012 by the re-financed Transmission Records, this time as a two-disc set containing previously unreleased studio sessions, single edits and a handful of demo recordings.

== Track listing ==
Decipher track listing
No.	Title	Lyrics	Music	Length
1.	"Ex Cathedra (Ouverture)"	Mark Jansen	Sander Gommans	2:02
2.	"Monolith of Doubt"	Floor Jansen	M. Jansen; Gommans; F. Jansen; After Forever	3:31
3.	"My Pledge of Allegiance #1 (The Sealed Fate)"	M. Jansen	Gommans; M. Jansen; F. Jansen; After Forever	6:24
4.	"Emphasis"	F. Jansen	Gommans; M. Jansen; F. Jansen; After Forever	4:18
5.	"Intrinsic"	F. Jansen	M. Jansen; Gommans; F. Jansen; After Forever	6:44
6.	"Zenith"	F. Jansen	M. Jansen; Gommans; André Borgman; F. Jansen; After Forever	4:21
7.	"Estranged (A Timeless Spell)"	M. Jansen	M. Jansen; Gommans; F. Jansen; After Forever	6:54
8.	"Imperfect Tenses"	F. Jansen	M. Jansen; F. Jansen	4:08
9.	"My Pledge of Allegiance #2 (The Tempted Fate)"	M. Jansen	Gommans; M. Jansen; F. Jansen; After Forever	5:05
10.	"The Key"	F. Jansen	Gommans; M. Jansen; F. Jansen; After Forever	4:47
11.	"Forlorn Hope"	M. Jansen	M. Jansen; Gommans; F. Jansen; After Forever	6:21
Total length:				54:35

Japanese and vinyl limited edition bonus track
No.	Title	Lyrics	Music	Length
12.	"For the Time Being"	M. Jansen	M. Jansen; Gommans; F. Jansen; After Forever	5:04
Total length:				59:39

Digipack limited edition bonus tracks
No.	Title	Length
12.	"My Pledge of Allegiance #1" (live at 2 Meter Sessies)	6:27
13.	"Forlorn Hope" (live at 2 Meter Sessies)	6:22
Total length:		67:24

2007 Japanese Collector's Edition – disc two: Exordium
No.	Title	Lyrics	Music	Length
1.	"Line of Thoughts" (instrumental)		Gommans	2:15
2.	"Beneath"	F. Jansen	Gommans; Lando van Gils; F. Jansen; Luuk van Gerven; Borgman; Bas Maas	4:52
3.	"My Choice"	F. Jansen	Gommans; Van Gils; F. Jansen; Van Gerven; Borgman; Maas	4:53
4.	"Glorifying Means"	F. Jansen	Gommans; Van Gils; F. Jansen; Van Gerven; Borgman; Maas	5:00
5.	"The Evil That Men Do" (Iron Maiden cover)	Bruce Dickinson; Adrian Smith; Steve Harris	Dickinson; Smith; Harris	4:50
6.	"One Day I'll Fly Away" (Randy Crawford cover)	Joe Sample; Will Jennings	Sample; Jennings	4:43
Total length:				26:33

2012 reissue – disc one: The Album (bonus tracks)
No.	Title	Lyrics	Music	Length
12.	"For the Time Being"			5:04
13.	"Who Wants to Live Forever" (Queen cover)	Brian May	May	4:48
14.	"Imperfect Tenses" (with Damian Wilson)			4:10
15.	"Monolith of Doubt" (single version)			3:32
16.	"Imperfect Tenses" (orchestral version)			4:06
Total length:				76:19

2012 reissue – disc two: The Sessions
No.	Title	Length
1.	"The Key" (session version)	4:42
2.	"Monolith of Doubt" (session version)	3:31
3.	"My Pledge of Allegiance #2" (session version)	5:02
4.	"Emphasis" (session version)	4:17
5.	"Estranged" (session version)	6:53
6.	"My Pledge of Allegiance #1" (session version)	6:20
7.	"Imperfect Tenses" (session version)	4:05
8.	"For the Time Being" (session version)	5:02
9.	"Forlorn Hope" (session version)	6:20
10.	"Zenith" (session version)	4:18
11.	"Intrinsic" (session version)	6:56
12.	"Who Wants to Live Forever" (session version)	4:48
13.	"Monolith of Doubt" (demo)	3:43
14.	"Emphasis" (demo)	4:30
15.	"For the Time Being" (demo)	5:09
Total length:		75:36

== Personnel ==
After Forever

- Floor Jansen – vocals
- Mark Jansen – guitars, screaming
- Sander Gommans – guitars, grunts
- Luuk van Gerven – bass guitar
- Lando van Gils – synths
- André Borgman – drums, acoustic guitars

Production

- Stephen van Haestregt – production, engineer
- Oscar Holleman – additional production, mixing
- Hans van Vuuren – executive producer, coordination and research
- Peter van 't Riet – mastering

Additional musicians

- Cees' Kieboom – piano, keyboards
- Ebred Reijen – solo violin
- Noemi Bodden – violin
- Janine Baller – viola
- Carla Schrijner – violoncello
- Roxanne Steffen – double bass
- Irma Kort – oboe on "Intrinsic" and "My Pledge of Allegiance #1"
- Jack Pisters – sitar on "My Pledge of Allegiance #2"
- Rein Kolpa – tenor vocals on "Imperfect Tenses"
- Hans Cassa – choral bass vocals
- Caspar de Jonge – choral tenor vocals
- Marga Okhuizen – choral alto vocals
- Ellen Bakker – choral soprano vocals
- Damian Wilson – vocals on "Imperfect Tenses" (The Album bonus track version) and "Who Wants to Live Forever"
- Arjen Anthony Lucassen – guitar and keyboards on "Who Wants to Live Forever", all instruments on "Who Wants to Live Forever" (session version)
