= Sander Gommans =

Dutch musician and songwriter (born 1978)

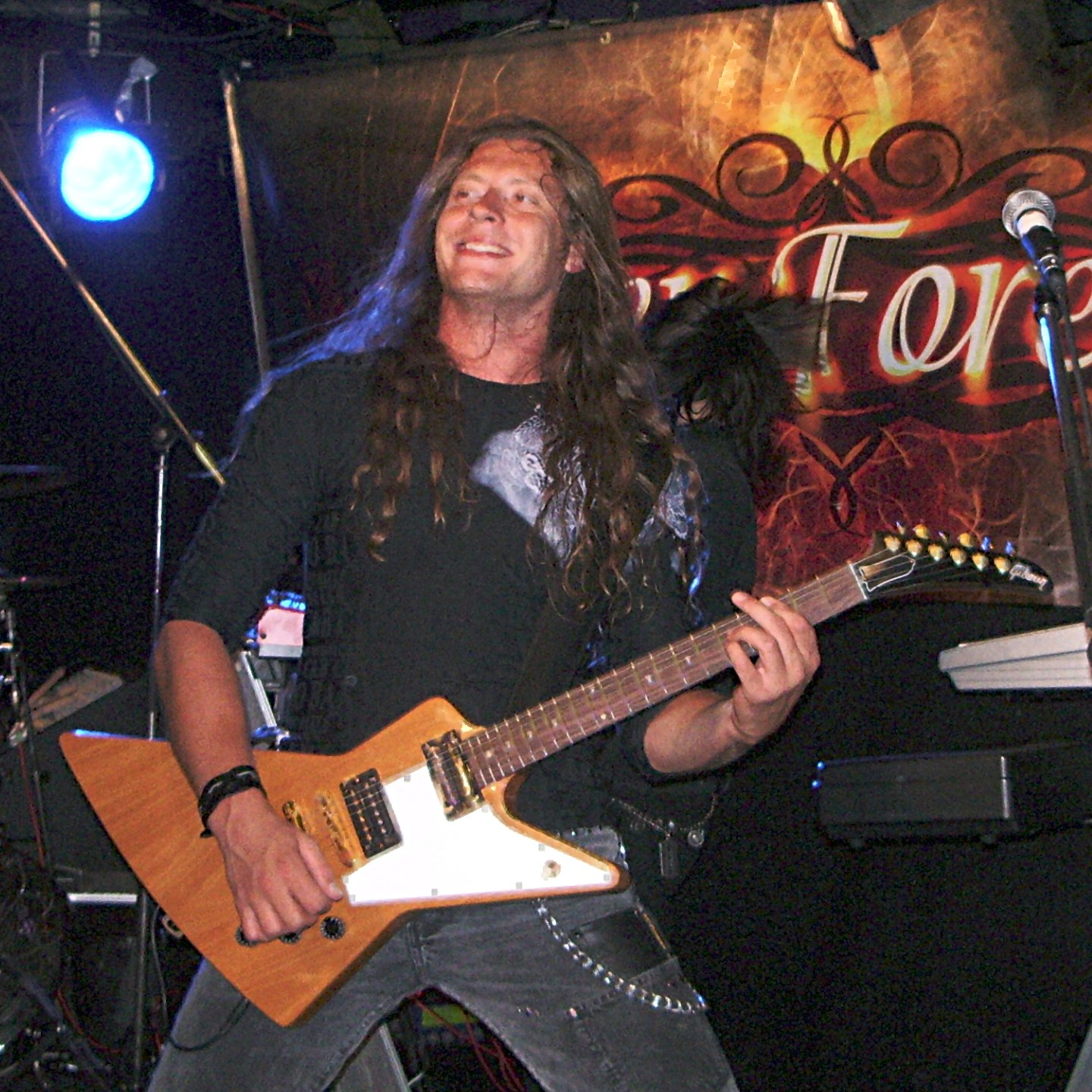
- Gommans performing with After Forever in 2007

Background information
- Born: 15 August 1978 (age 48); Reuver, Netherlands
- Genres: Symphonic metal, death metal, heavy metal
- Occupations: Musician, songwriter, record producer
- Instruments: Guitar, vocals
- Years active: 1995–present
- Labels: Nuclear Blast, Seasons of Mist, Frontiers

Sander Gommans (born 15 August 1978) is a Dutch musician and songwriter. He founded the symphonic metal band Apocalypse with Mark Jansen in 1995, which later changed its name to After Forever. He played guitar and performed the vocal grunting parts in the band. He managed the band and was the main writer of After Forever's music.

== Career ==
After recording all guitars for the album Rise of the Warrior by Anna Phoebe, he began a project called HDK, which is signed to Season of Mist; HDK's debut album, System Overload, was released on 23 February 2009.

He is also the additional lead guitarist on Kiske/Somerville, an album by the German singer, keyboard player and guitarist Michael Kiske (ex-Helloween) and the American singer-songwriter and vocal coach Amanda Somerville. In 2010, he co-wrote the album Scheepers, a solo album of Primal Fear's lead vocalist Ralf Scheepers.

Resulting from his partnership with Amanda Somerville on HDK and Kiske/Somerville, Sander became one of the main members of Amanda's self heavy metal-oriented project called Trillium, which first album Alloy was released in fall 2011 by the record company Frontiers Records.

He released another HDK album, Serenades of the Netherworld, and he owns, together with longtime friend Paul Simons, a music company called "The Rock Station", which consists of a music academy, a music studio, music management and music merchandise.

Between 2015 and 2019, Gommans joined forces with Scott Wenmakers (teacher and illustrator) and Menno Kappe (Graviton Music Services) to work on "Enter the Metal Realm", the first chapter of Magic-O-Metal, a heavy/power metal musical project for children. Through the website, people can (pre-)order various products concerning the project.

On 15 December 2021, Gommans released a song called "Lords of Power Theme".

== Personal life ==
On 19 August 2013, it was revealed that Gommans was engaged to be married to Amanda Somerville, and the pair were married in July 2014. On 8 January 2015, she announced that she and Sander Gommans were expecting their first child. In July 2015, their daughter, Lana Elise Gommans, was born. In 2018, their twin daughters Anya and Juliet were born.

Prior to marrying Somerville, Gommans had been in a relationship with Floor Jansen.

== Discography ==
=== With After Forever ===
- Prison of Desire (2000)
- Decipher (2001)
- Exordium (EP) (2003)
- Invisible Circles (2004)
- Remagine (2005)
- After Forever (2007)

==== EPs ====
- Exordium (2003)

==== Singles ====
- "Follow in the Cry" (2000)
- "Emphasis/Who Wants to Live Forever" (2002)
- "Monolith of Doubt" (2002)
- "My Choice/The Evil That Men Do" (2003)
- "Digital Deceit" (2004)
- "Being Everyone" (2005)
- "Two Sides/Boundaries Are Open" (2006)
- "Energize Me" (2007)
- "Equally Destructive" (2007)

==== Demos ====
- Ephemeral (1999)
- Wings of Illusion (1999)

==== Compilations ====
- Mea Culpa (2006)

=== Studio albums ===
- System Overload (2009)
- Serenades of the Netherworld (2014)

=== Singles & EP's ===
- Borderland (in collaboration with Magic-O-Metal) (2022)
- Human Error (in collaboration with Magic-O-Metal) (2023)

=== With Trillium ===
- Alloy (2011)
- Tectonic (2018)

=== With Magic-O-Metal ===
Studio albums

- Enter the Metal Realm (2019)

Singles & EP's

- Roboshredder (2021)
- Loud and Proud - Children of Hope (2021)
- Imagine (2022)
- Borderland (in collaboration with HDK) (2022)
- Human Error (in collaboration with HDK) (2023)

=== Other credits ===
- Epica - The Divine Conspiracy (2007) - vocals on "Death of a Dream ~ The Embrace That Smothers part VII"
- Anna Phoebe - Rise of the Warrior (2008) - guitars
- Kiske/Somerville - Kiske/Somerville (2010) - writing credits and guitars
- Ralf Scheepers - Scheepers (2011) - writing credits and guitars
- MaYaN - Quarterpast (2011) - writing credits on "Bite the Bullet"
- Aeverium - The Harvest (2013) - producing on "Heaven's Burning (Harvest Time)"
- Kiske/Somerville - City of Heroes (2015) - writing credits on Breaking Neptune
- Beyond the Black - Songs of Love and Death (2015) - backing vocals and shouts on "Hallelujah"

New title	Vocalist for After Forever Guitarist for After Forever; 1995–2009	Disbanded
New title	Vocalist for HDK Guitarist for HDK since 2009	Incumbent
