= Reuver =

- Village
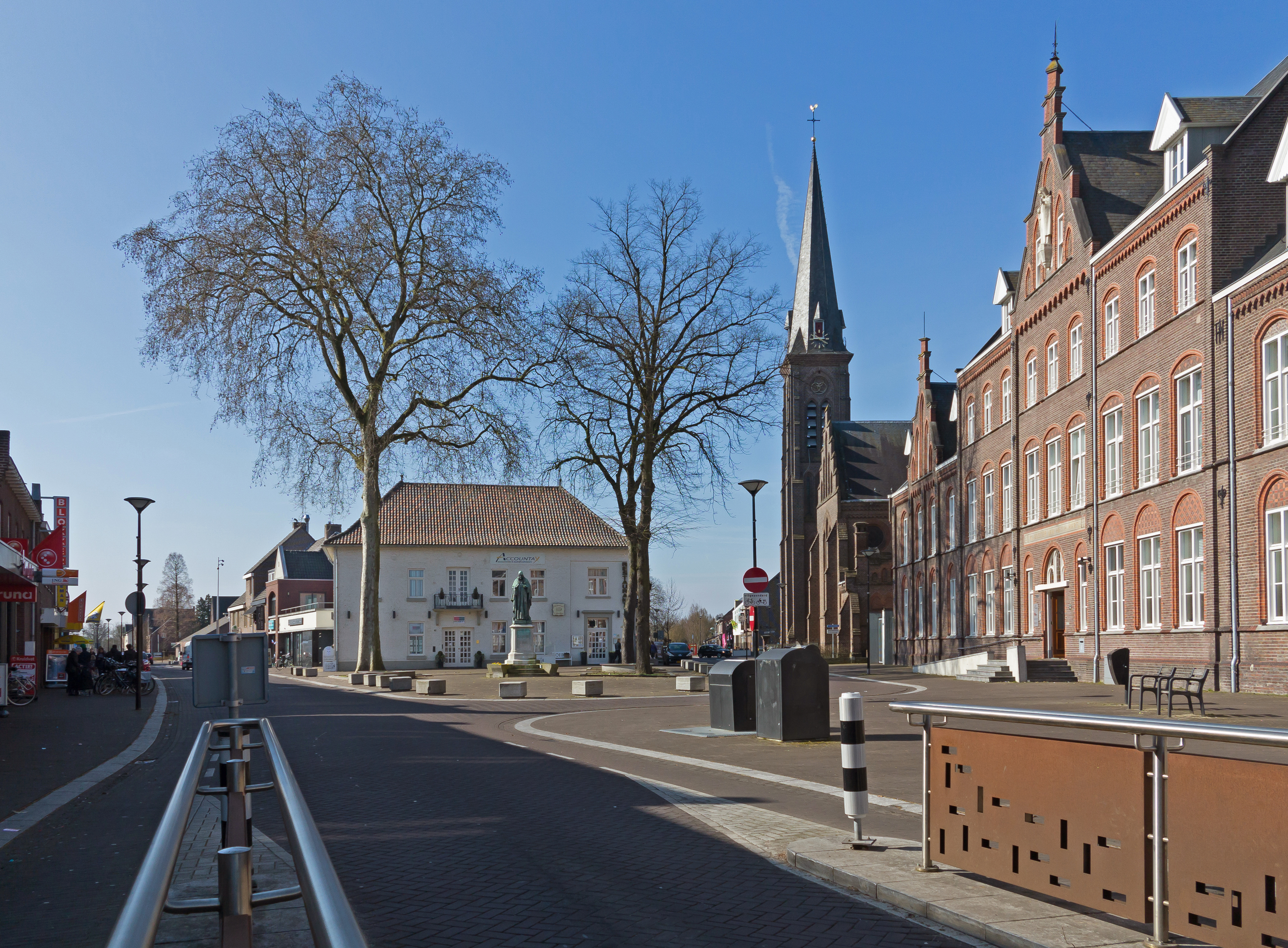
- St Lambertus Church

- Location in the Netherlands Location in the province of Limburg in the Netherlands
- Coordinates: 51°17′6″N 6°4′45″E
- Country: Netherlands
- Province: Limburg
- Municipality: Beesel

Area
  - Total: 4.52 km^{2} (1.75 sq mi)
- Elevation: 25 m (82 ft)

Population (2021)
  - Total: 6,120
  - Density: 1,350/km^{2} (3,510/sq mi)
- Time zone: UTC+1 (CET)
  - Summer (DST): UTC+2 (CEST)
- Postal code: 5953
- Dialing code: 077

Reuver (Limburgish: Oppe Ruiver) is a village in the Dutch province of Limburg. It is located in the municipality of Beesel, about 10 km (6 miles) south of the city of Venlo. The successful metal band Epica comes from Reuver.

== History ==
The village was first mentioned in 1547 de Roever, and is a name of an inn. Reuver is a village which developed on the road from Venlo to Roermond.

The Catholic St Lambertus Church was built between 1878 and 1880 as a three aisled basilica like church which is oriented north-south. In 1944 and 1945, it was damaged and repaired between 1946 and 1947. The tower was rebuilt in 1957.

The Holy Heart monastery was between 1890 and 1891 as a Dominican monastery with school. In 1921, the school became a regular high school. In 1981, the whole complex was converted into a retirement home.

Reuver was home to 224 people in 1840. In the late-19th century, it started to industrialise.

== Transportation ==
In 1865, the Reuver railway station opened on the Maastricht to Venlo railway line.

== Notable people ==
- Sander Gommans, guitar player, co-vocalist and founder of symphonic metal band After Forever.
- Mark Jansen, guitar player, co-vocalist and founder of symphonic metal bands After Forever, Epica and MaYaN.

== Gallery ==
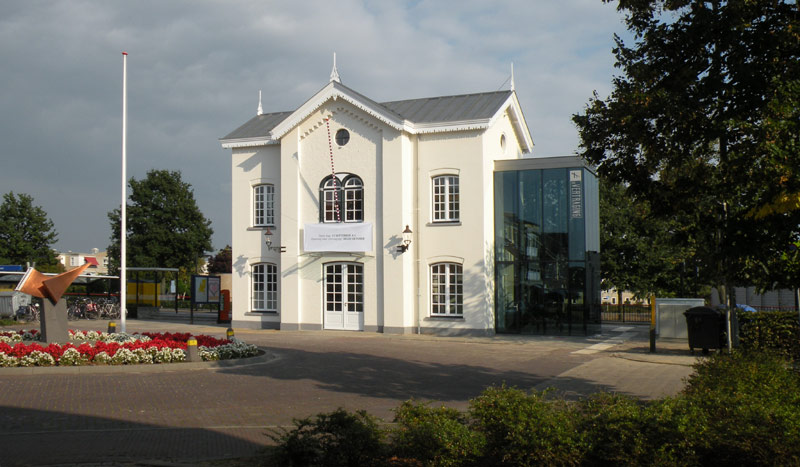
Reuver railway station

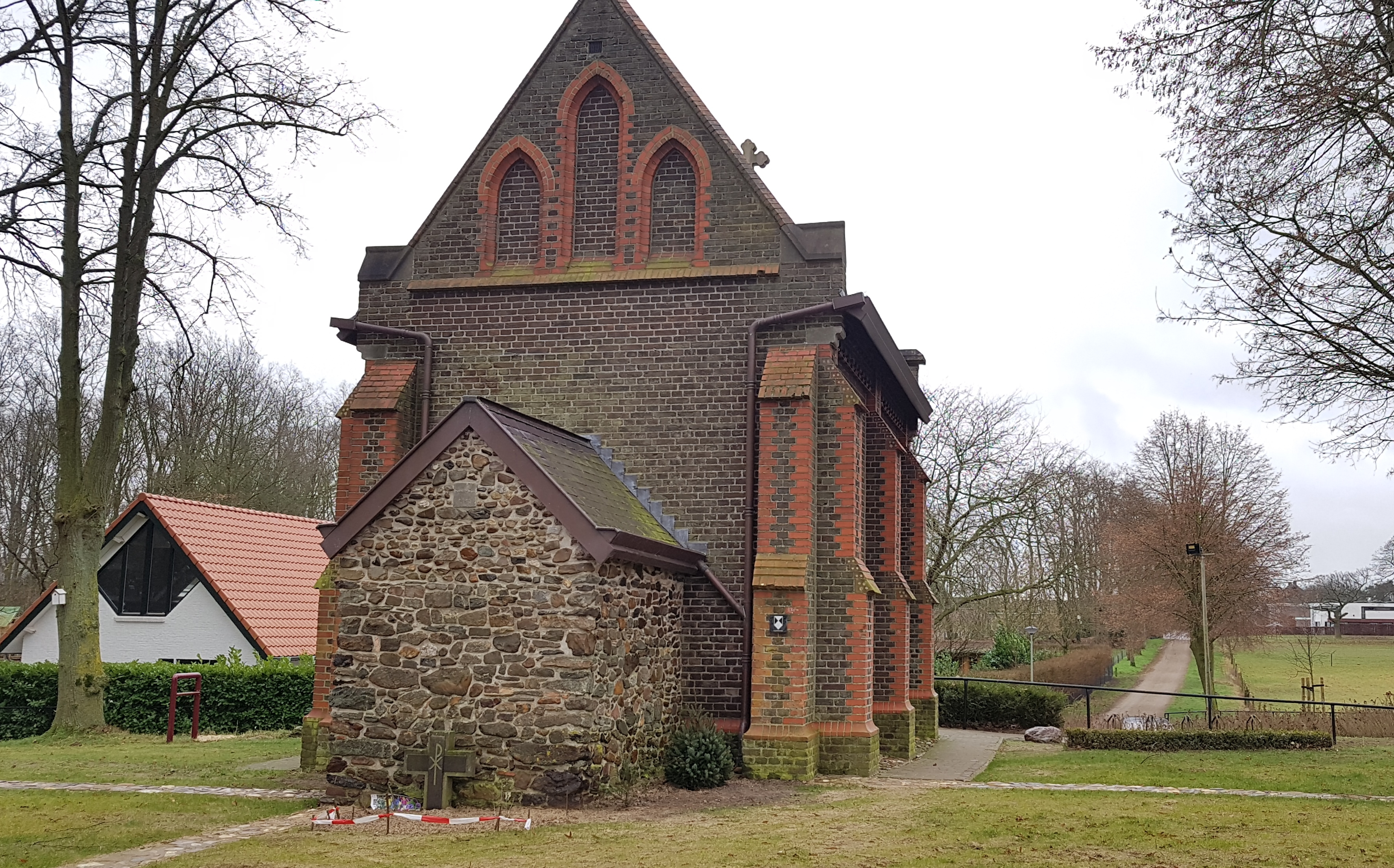
Lambertus Chapel

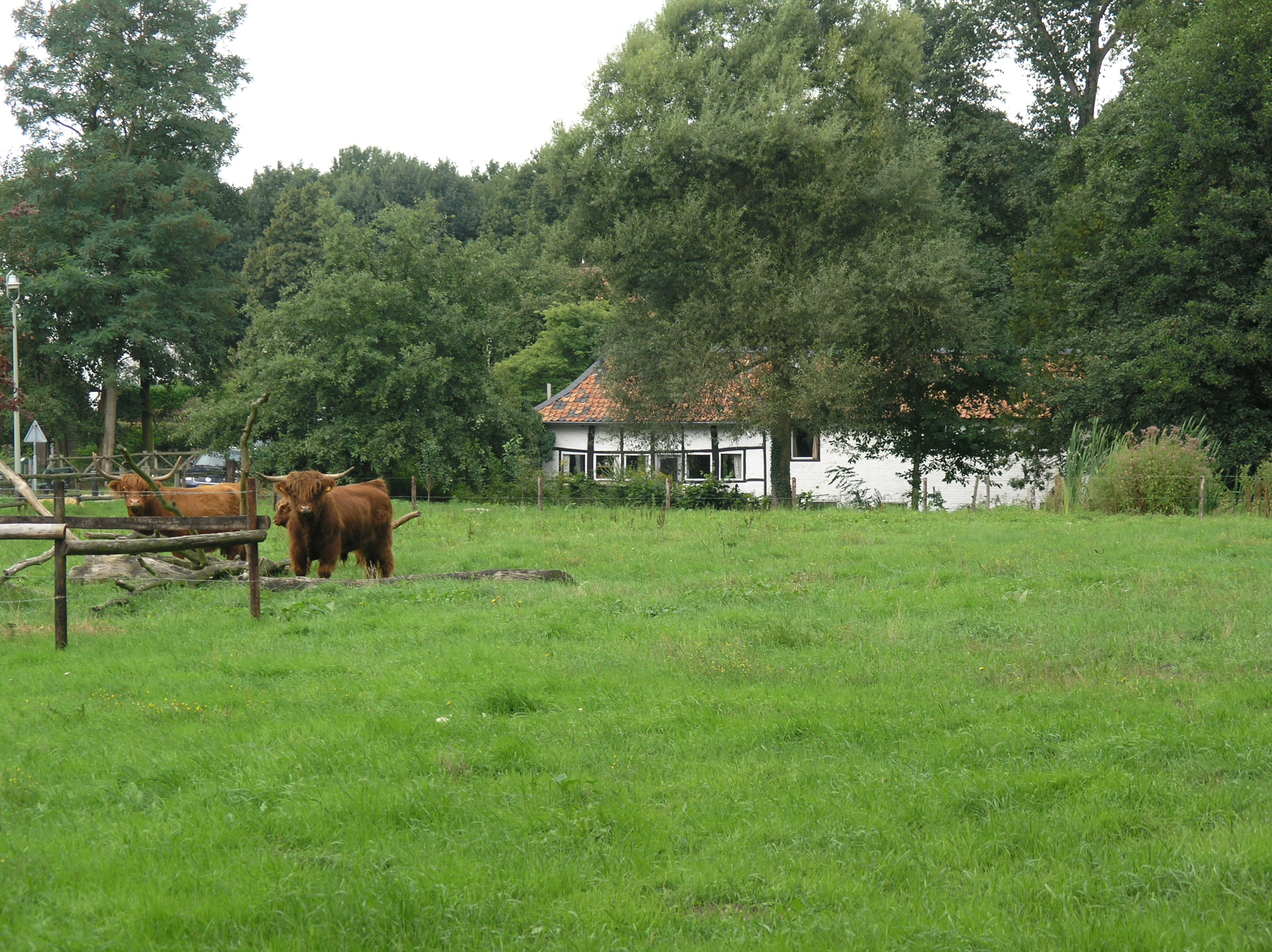
Water mill Ronkensteijn with cows

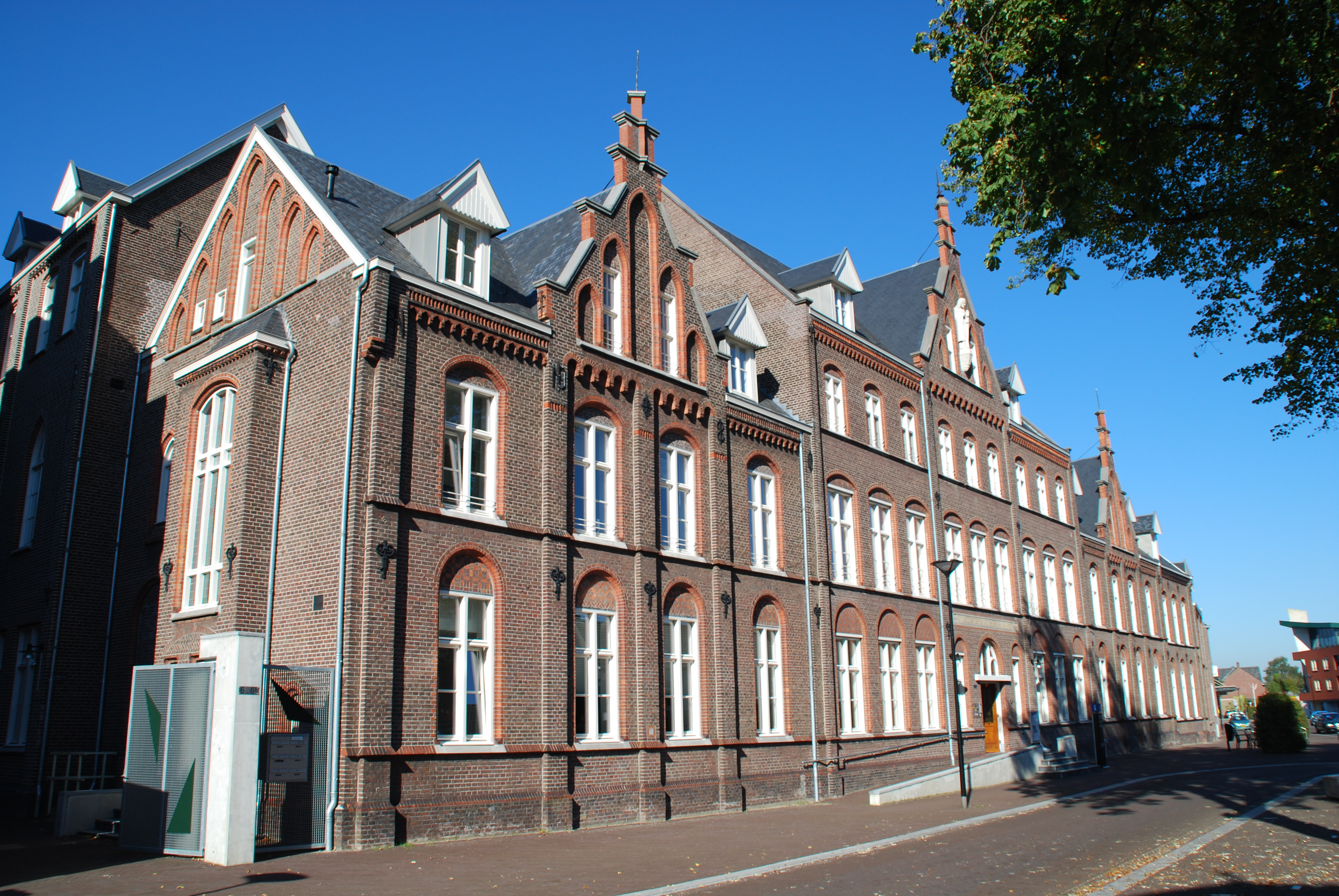
Holy Heart monastery
