= Mark Jansen =

Dutch heavy metal musician

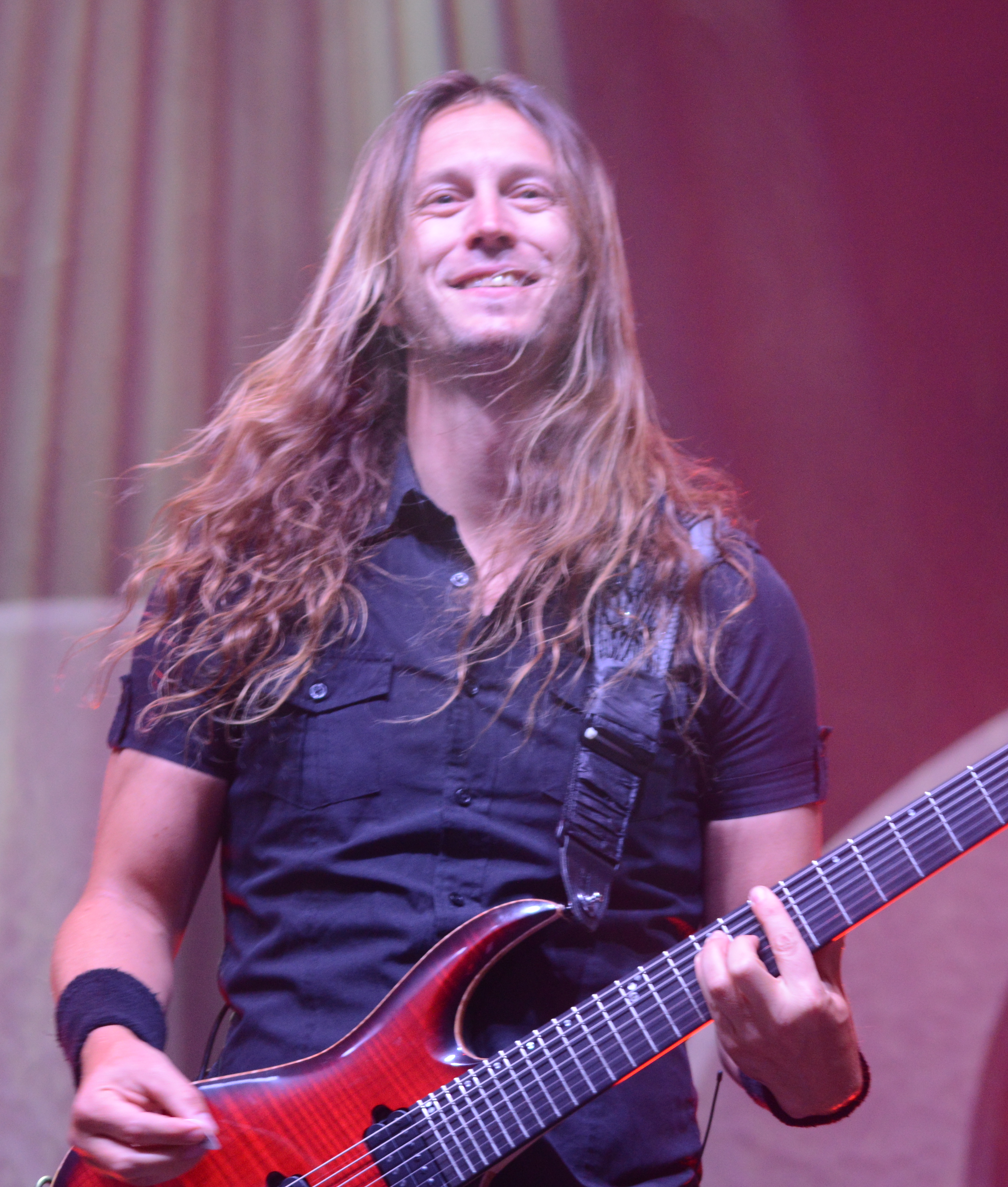
- Jansen performing in 2022

Background information
- Born: Markus H. J. Jansen; 15 December 1978 (age 47); Reuver, Limburg, Netherlands
- Genres: Symphonic metal, progressive metal, death metal
- Occupations: Musician, songwriter
- Instruments: Guitar, vocals
- Years active: 1995–present

Markus Hubertus Johannes Jansen (born 15 December 1978) is a Dutch guitarist, vocalist, and songwriter. A prominent figure in the symphonic metal subgenre, he is known for his work with the bands After Forever (1995–2002), Epica (2002–present), and MaYaN (2010–present).

In both After Forever and Epica, he has performed growled vocals, complementing the vocals of, respectively, Floor Jansen (no relation) and Simone Simons.

== Career ==
=== After Forever (1995–2002) ===
As guitarist, Jansen founded After Forever with Sander Gommans, and was one of the main songwriters for the band's first two albums, Prison of Desire and Decipher. During his time with After Forever, the band's music had been strongly influenced by Jansen's love for movie soundtracks and classical music, with the albums' lyrics showcasing Jansen's interest for religious and moral themes, as demonstrated through The Embrace That Smothers and My Pledge of Allegiance.

Jansen left After Forever in 2002 as a result of creative differences with the rest of the band. Prior to his departure, he had intended to further explore complex interactions between classical instruments, choruses in Latin and death metal elements in the band's next album, while Gommans and the others preferred a more direct and aggressive approach to music, retaining some elements that made the sound of the band recognizable, but expanding it in new and different directions. These musical differences led to Mark Jansen leaving the band, in what he felt as an actual dismissal. After his departure, the band took a new musical direction.

In a 2007 interview, Jansen described his departure from After Forever as coming as a shock to him at the time, with the news of his dismissal being delivered to him by fellow band members shortly before a band rehearsal. At the time of his dismissal, the band were preparing to participate in a series of major tours and concerts such as Pinkpop.

=== Epica (2002–present) ===
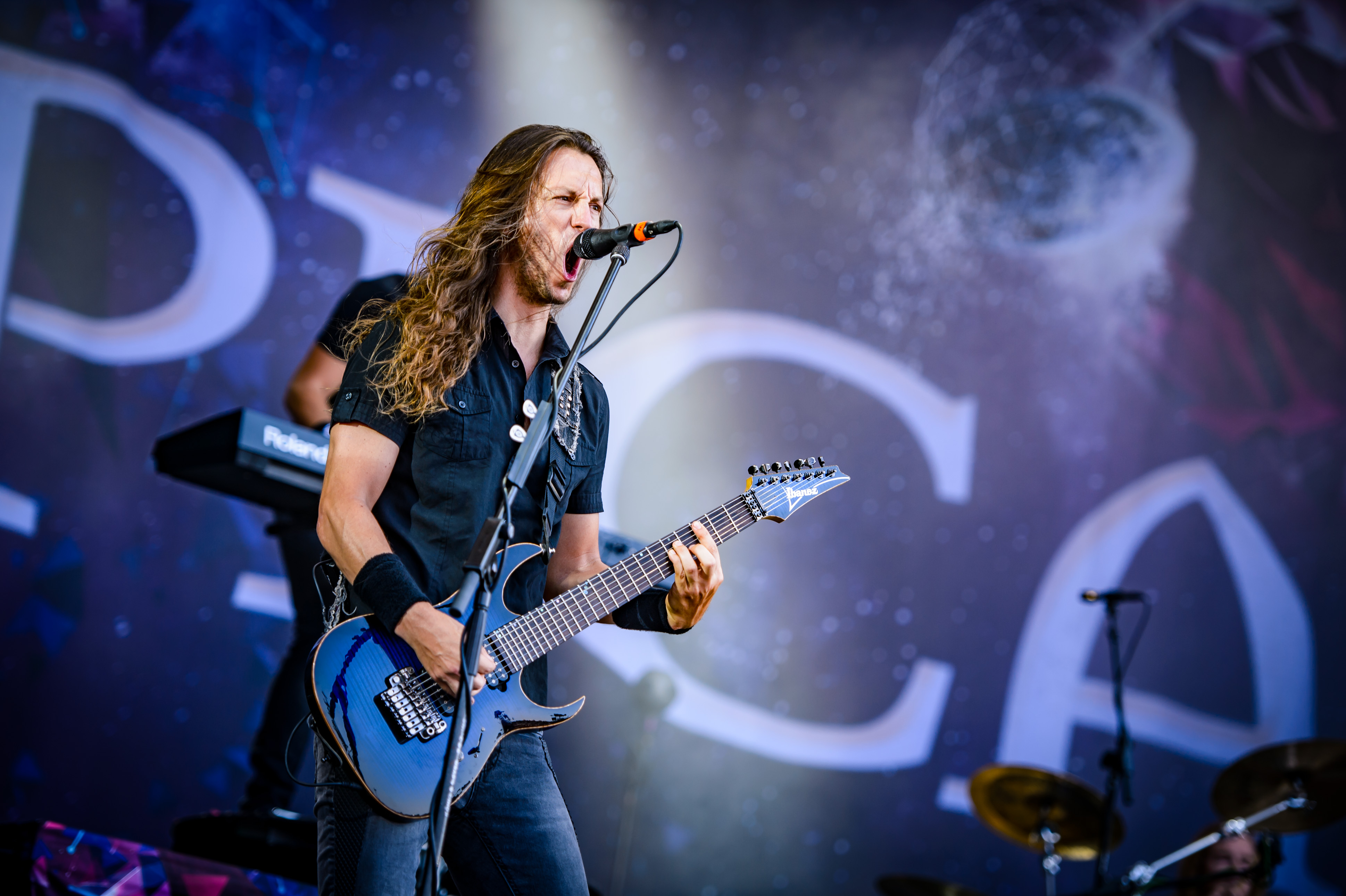
Jansen playing at Wacken Open Air, in 2018.

After his departure from After Forever, began looking for musicians who would work towards a more classical/symphonic type of music project; this was initially named Sahara Dust. In late 2002, the band courted Helena Iren Michaelsen (from Trail of Tears) as its frontwoman, but shortly after, she was replaced by the then unknown Simone Simons in 2003, who was Jansen's girlfriend at the time. The band's line-up was completed by guitarist Ad Sluijter, drummer Jeroen Simons, bassist Yves Huts, and keyboard player Coen Janssen. The name was later changed to Epica, inspired by Kamelot's album of the same name.

Through Epica, Jansen continued to further pursue the combination of symphonic metal with gothic metal elements, that had been present in After Forever's first two albums. Over time, the band began to incorporate strong death metal influences into their sound. Starting from the third album, progressive metal influences have also become evident. In addition, the band often uses thrash metal and groove metal riffs, black metal passages (mostly in the drum technique), power metal moments and references to Arabic music. Some songs also have electronic shades, djent transitions and folk metal melodies derived from Middle Eastern, Chinese and Celtic traditions. Epica is also known for the attention to the vocal lines that, in contrast to the heavy context, weave very catchy, easy to hold, sophisticated and emotional melodies. The band's lyrics often deal with philosophical, psychological, spiritual, moral, scientific, environmental, socio-political, global and topical and personal themes, and the band is also known for their wide use of orchestra and opera choirs.

=== MaYaN (2010–present) ===
In 2010, Jansen announced that he and former After Forever keyboardist Jack Driessen have formed another band called MaYaN. The name was chosen by Jansen out of his fascination for the ancient Maya civilization. MaYaN's lyrical themes include religion, politics, and world events, as well as philosophy, meditation, existence, and inner struggles. The band has released three studio albums to date, Quarterpast in 2011, Antagonise in 2014 and Dhyana in 2018.

Unlike his other bands, Jansen sings but does not play guitar, with the band featuring many different vocalists (either full-time members or guests) in a mix of clean vocals, growled vocals, and screams, supported by an instrumentation combining both heavy metal and symphonic metal elements.

=== United Metal Minds (2018–present) ===
Recently, Jansen has launched the international musical project United Metal Minds.

== Personal life ==
Jansen was born in Reuver, Netherlands, and has a master's degree in psychology. In his adolescent years, Jansen originally wanted to become a cyclist; his interest in performing was sparked from attending a Gorefest show when he was 15 years old.

Since 2011, he has been in a relationship with Italian singer Laura Macrì. In the past, he had a relationship with Simone Simons; the relationship ended in 2005, shortly after the release of Consign to Oblivion. Jansen first met Simons in the chatroom on After Forever's website, when he was searching for a singer for a side project, with the then-16 year old Simons making a positive impression after singing to him over the phone during their first telephone conversation.

On 12 November 2023, Jansen and Macri's first daughter Ilse was born in Italy. Both parents announced Ilse's birth on their social media.

== Discography ==
=== After Forever ===
Studio albums

- Prison of Desire (2000)
- Decipher (2001)

=== Epica ===
Studio albums

- The Phantom Agony (2003)
- Consign to Oblivion (2005)
- The Divine Conspiracy (2007)
- Design Your Universe (2009)
- Requiem for the Indifferent (2012)
- The Quantum Enigma (2014)
- The Holographic Principle (2016)
- Omega (2021)
- Aspiral (2025)

Live & Soundtrack albums

- The Score – An Epic Journey (2005)
- The Classical Conspiracy (2009)

=== MaYaN ===
Studio albums

- Quarterpast (2011)
- Antagonise (2014)
- Dhyana (2018)
