= Epica discography =

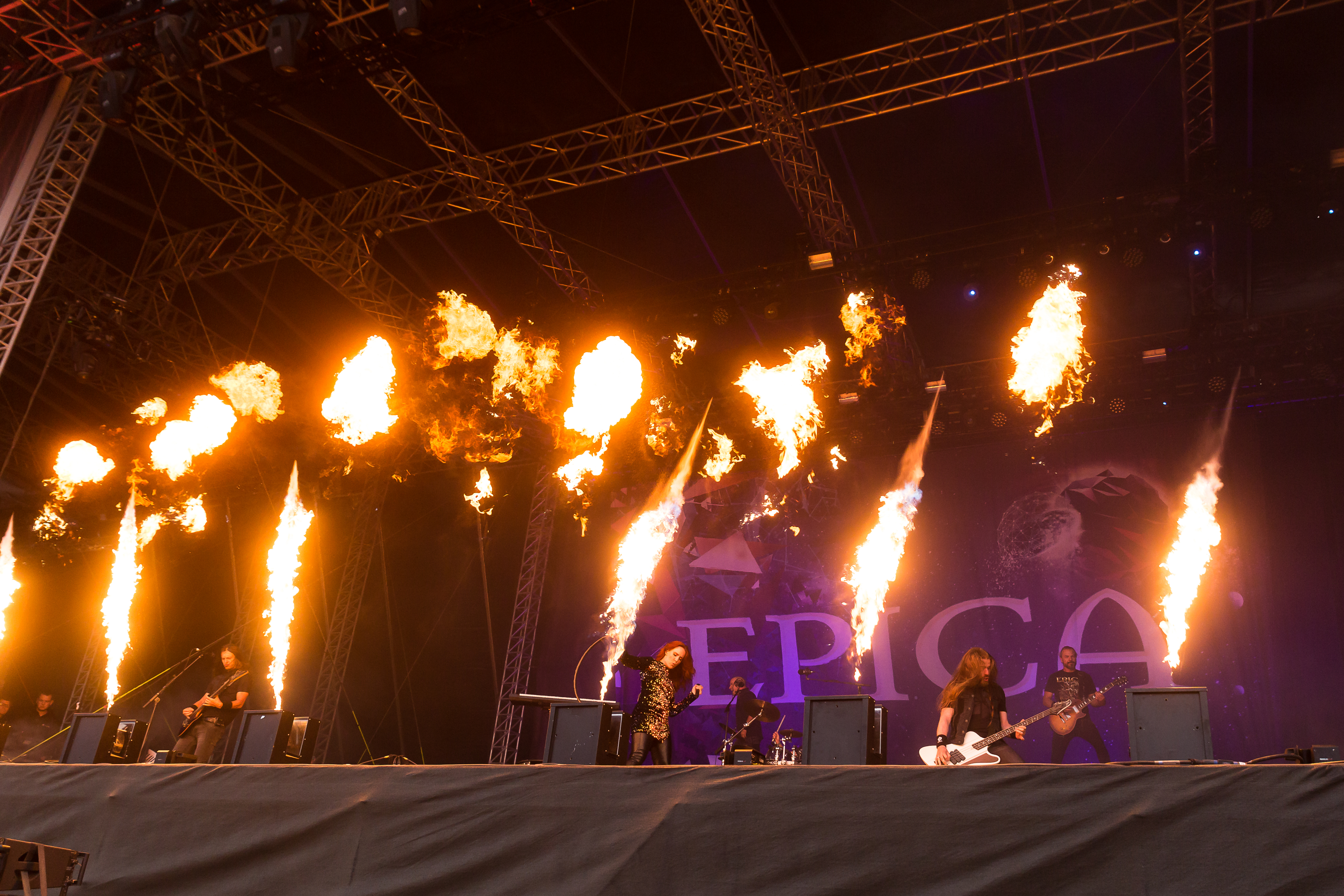
- Epíca performing live at Rockharz Open Air, 2019
- Studio albums: 9
- Extended plays: 6
- Soundtrack albums: 1
- Live albums: 5
- Compilation albums: 4
- Singles: 44
- Video albums: 4
- Music videos: 61
- Track commentary: 2

The discography of Epica, a Dutch symphonic metal band, consists of nine studio albums, two track commentary albums, five live albums, six extended plays, one soundtrack, forty-four singles and one other release.

== Albums ==
=== Studio albums ===
Title	Album details	Peak chart positions										Sales
Title	Album details	NLD	AUT	BEL	FIN	FRA	GER	JPN	SWI	UK	US	Sales
The Phantom Agony	Released: 5 June 2003; Label: Transmission; Formats: CD	8	—	114	—	—	—	—	—	—	—	
Consign to Oblivion	Released: 21 April 2005; Label: Transmission; Formats: CD	12	—	52	—	116	—	—	—	—	—	
The Divine Conspiracy	Released: 7 September 2007; Label: Nuclear Blast; Formats: CD, digital download	9	—	40	—	35	41	148	29	—	—	
Design Your Universe	Released: 16 October 2009; Label: Nuclear Blast; Formats: CD, digital download	8	70	40	—	31	37	228	27	—	—	US: 2,100+
Requiem for the Indifferent	Released: 9 March 2012; Label: Nuclear Blast; Formats: CD, digital download	12	33	27	37	35	26	172	14	112	105	US: 4,800+
The Quantum Enigma	Released: 2 May 2014; Label: Nuclear Blast; Formats: CD, digital download	4	30	33	26	38	11	68	17	53	110	US: 3,700+
The Holographic Principle	Released: 30 September 2016; Label: Nuclear Blast; Formats: CD, digital download	4	21	12	26	26	9	105	8	46	139	
Omega	Released: 26 February 2021; Label: Nuclear Blast; Formats: CD, LP, digital download	7	15	6	18	49	4	113	5	73	—	
Aspiral	Released: 11 April 2025; Label: Nuclear Blast; Formats: CD, LP, DL	2	8	5	23	—	5	—	7	—	—	
"—" denotes album that did not chart or was not released

=== Track commentary albums ===
Title	Album details
The Quantum Enigma (Track Commentary)	Released: 2 May 2014; Label: Nuclear Blast; Formats: Digital download
The Holographic Principle (Track Commentary)	Released: 19 March 2019; Label: Nuclear Blast; Formats: Digital download

=== Live albums ===
Title	Album details	Peak chart positions				Sales
Title	Album details	NLD	FRA	GER	SWI	Sales
We Will Take You with Us	Released: September 2004; Label: Transmission; Formats: CD, DVD	62	—	—	—	
The Classical Conspiracy	Released: 8 May 2009; Label: Nuclear Blast; Formats: CD	23	43	87	81	US: 700+
Retrospect	Released: 8 November 2013; Label: Nuclear Blast; Formats: CD, DVD, Blu-ray	7	167	46	—	US: 890+
Omega Alive	Released: 2 December 2021; Label: Nuclear Blast; Formats: CD, DVD, Blu-ray	56	—	26	41	
Live at Paradiso	Released: 2 September 2022; Label: Nuclear Blast; Formats: 2×CD+DVD, 3×LP	77	—	—	—	
Live at the Symphonic Synergy	Released: 11 April 2025; Label: Nuclear Blast; Formats: Collector's box set, 5-disc Earbook, 2-disc digipak	—	—	—	—	
"—" denotes album that did not chart or was not released

=== Soundtracks ===
Title	Album details	Peak chart positions	
Title	Album details	NLD	FRA
The Score – An Epic Journey	Released: 8 September 2005; Label: Transmission; Formats: CD	54	191

=== Compilation albums ===
Title	Album details	Peak chart positions
Title	Album details	NLD
The Road to Paradiso	Released: 8 May 2006; Label: Transmission; Formats: CD	46
The Singles Collection	Released: 14 May 2010; Label: Nuclear Blast; Formats: Digital download	—
Best Of	Released: 14 October 2013; Label: Nuclear Blast; Formats: digital download	—
We Still Take You With Us - The Early Years (box set)	Released: 2 September 2022; Label: Nuclear Blast; Formats: CD, Blu-ray, DVD, 11×LP box	—
"—" denotes album that did not chart or was not released

=== Video albums ===
Title	Album details	Peak chart positions
Title	Album details	SWI
We Will Take You with Us	Released: September 2004; Label: Transmission Records; Formats: DVD	—
Retrospect	Released: 8 November 2013; Label: Nuclear Blast; Formats: DVD+CD, Blu-ray+CD	9
Omega Alive	Released: 2 December 2021; Label: Nuclear Blast; Formats: DVD, Blu-ray	—
Live at Paradiso	Released: 2 September 2022; Label: Nuclear Blast; Formats: 2×CD+DVD	—
"—" denotes album that did not chart or was not released

== EPs ==
Title	EP details	Peak chart positions					
Title	EP details	NLD	AUT	BEL	GER	JPN	SWI
The Solace System	Released: 1 September 2017; Label: Nuclear Blast; Formats: CD, digital download	—	—	—	60	—	—
Epica vs Attack on Titan Songs	Released: 20 December 2017 (Japan) 20 July 2018 (world); Label: Chaos Reigns / Nuclear Blast; Formats: CD, LP, digital download	—	53	—	48	82	15
The Acoustic Universe	Released: 4 October 2019; Label: Nuclear Blast; Formats: LP	—	—	—	—	—	—
The Quantum Enigma B-Sides	Released: 11 September 2020; Label: Nuclear Blast; Formats: digital download	—	—	—	—	—	—
Omegacoustic	Released: 25 February 2021; Label: Nuclear Blast; Formats: CD, digital download	—	—	—	—	—	—
The Alchemy Project	Released: 11 November 2022; Label: Atomic Fire; Formats: CD, LP, digital download	40	60	194	39	—	35
"—" denotes album that did not chart or was not released

=== Live EPs ===
Title	Details
Live at the AFAS Live	Released: 6 March 2023; Label: Nuclear Blast; Formats: digital download

== Singles ==
Title	Year	Peak chart positions	Album
Title	Year	NLD	Album
"The Phantom Agony"	2003	—	The Phantom Agony
"Feint"	2004	—	The Phantom Agony
"Cry for the Moon"	2004	—	The Phantom Agony
"Solitary Ground"	2005	46	Consign to Oblivion
"Quietus (Silent Reverie)"	2005	68	Consign to Oblivion
"Never Enough"	2007	—	The Divine Conspiracy
"Chasing the Dragon"	2008	—	The Divine Conspiracy
"Unleashed"	2009	—	Design Your Universe
"Martyr of the Free Word / From the Heaven of My Heart"	2009	—	Design Your Universe
"This is the Time"	2010	—	Non-album single
"Storm the Sorrow"	2012	—	Requiem for the Indifferent
"Forevermore"	2012	—	Non-album single
"Happiness"	2012	—	Acoustic Dance Sessions
"Unleashed"	2013	—	Retrospect
"The Essence of Silence"	2014	—	The Quantum Enigma
"Unchain Utopia"	2014	—	The Quantum Enigma
"Unchain Utopia" (Live at the AB)	2015	—	Non-album single
"Universal Death Squad"	2016	—	The Holographic Principle
"Edge of the Blade"	2016	—	The Holographic Principle
"Fight Your Demons"	2016	—	The Solace System
"The Solace System"	2017	—	The Solace System
"Crimson Bow and Arrow"	2018	—	Epica Vs Attack on Titan Songs
"If Inside These Walls Was a House"	2018	—	Epica Vs Attack on Titan Songs
"Beyond the Matrix - The Battle"	2018	—	Non-album single
"Kingdom of Heaven"	2019	—	Design Your Universe (Gold Edition)
"Abyss of Time"	2020	—	Omega
"Freedom – The Wolves Within"	2020	—	Omega
"Rivers"	2021	—	Omega
"The Skeleton Key"	2021	—	Omega
"Unchain Utopia - Omega Alive"	2021	—	Omega Alive
"The Skeleton Key - Omega Alive"	2021	—	Omega Alive
"Kingdom of Heaven Part 3 - The Antediluvian Universe - Omega Alive"	2021	—	Omega Alive
"Sensorium" (Live at Paradiso)	2022	—	Live at Paradiso
"The Last Crusade" (Live at Paradiso)	2022	—	Live at Paradiso
"Run for a Fall" (Acoustic)	2022	—	We Still Take You with Us
"The Final Lullaby"	2022	—	The Alchemy Project
"The Great Tribulation"	2022	—	The Alchemy Project
"Rivers" (Live at the AFAS Live)	2023	—	Live at the AFAS Live
"Unleashed" (Live at the AFAS Live)	2023	—	Live at the AFAS Live
"Consign to Oblivion" (Live at the AFAS Live)	2023	—	Live at the AFAS Live
"Beyond the Matrix" (Live at the AFAS Live)	2023	—	Live at the AFAS Live
"Arcana"	2024	—	Aspiral
"Cross the Divide"	2025	—	Aspiral
"T.I.M.E."	2025	—	Aspiral
"Fight to Survive - The Overview Effect"	2025	—	Aspiral
"Avatar - The Final Incarnation -"	2025	—	Non-album single
"—" denotes album that did not chart or was not released

== Other releases ==
Title	Album details
Jägermeister Memory Stick	Released: October 10, 2009; Label: Independent; Format: USB flash drive

== Music videos ==
Year	Title	Directed	Album
2003	"The Phantom Agony"	Frank Herrebout	The Phantom Agony
2004	"Feint"	Frank Herrebout	The Phantom Agony
2005	"Solitary Ground"	—N/a	Consign to Oblivion
2005	"Quietus"	Mirko Cocco	Consign to Oblivion
2007	"Never Enough"	Ivan Colic	The Divine Conspiracy
2009	"Unleashed"	Tim Bown	Design Your Universe
2010	"This is the Time"	—N/a	—N/a
2012	"Storm the Sorrow"	Remko Tielemans	Requiem for the Indifferent
2012	"Forevermore" (Ruurd Woltring feat. Epica)	Niks te gek! (Dutch 'NTR' TV show)	—N/a
2014	"Victims of Contingency"	Remko Tielemans	The Quantum Enigma
2015	"The Obsessive Devotion (LIVE in Russia)"	Tele-Club Video Production	The Divine Conspiracy
2015	"The Essence of Silence (LIVE in Brussels)"	Jens De Vos	The Quantum Enigma
2015	"Unchain Utopia (LIVE in Brussels)"	Jens De Vos	The Quantum Enigma
2016	"Universal Death Squad"	Jens De Vos	The Holographic Principle
2016	"Edge of the Blade"	Jens De Vos	The Holographic Principle
2016	"Beyond the Matrix"	Jens De Vos	The Holographic Principle
2017	"The Solace System"	Davide Cilloni	The Solace System
2017	"Immortal Melancholy"	Davide Cilloni	The Solace System
2018	"Decoded Poetry"	Davide Cilloni	The Solace System
2018	"Universal Love Squad"	Jens De Vos	The Holographic Principle
2019	"Martyr of the Free Word - Acoustic Version"	—N/a	Design Your Universe - Gold Edition
2020	"Abyss of Time – Countdown to Singularity"	Grupa 13	Omega
2020	"Freedom – The Wolves Within"	Bram Knol	Omega
2020	"Abyss o' Time"	Jens De Vos	Omegacoustic
2021	"Rivers"	—N/a	Omega
2021	"Omegacoustic"	Jens De Vos	Omegacoustic
2021	"The Skeleton Key"	Grupa 13	Omega
2021	"Unchain Utopia - Omega Alive"	Jens De Vos	Omega Alive
2021	"The Skeleton Key - Omega Alive"	Jens De Vos	Omega Alive
2021	"Kingdom of Heaven Part 3 - The Antediluvian Universe - Omega Alive"	Jens De Vos	Omega Alive
2021	"Victims of Contingency - Omega Alive"	Jens De Vos	Omega Alive
2022	"Beyond the Matrix - Live at the Zenith"	Jens De Vos	The Holographic Principle
2022	"Sensorium - Live at Paradiso"	Jens De Vos	Live at Paradiso
2022	"The Last Crusade - Live at Paradiso"	Jens De Vos	Live at Paradiso
2022	"Blank Infinity - Live at Paradiso"	Jens De Vos	Live at Paradiso
2022	"Sirens – Of Blood And Water"	Patric Ullaeus	The Alchemy Project
2022	"The Final Lullaby"	Jens De Vos	The Alchemy Project
2023	"Rivers - Live in Chile"	Jens De Vos	Omega
2023	"Rivers - Live at the AFAS Live (feat. Apocalyptica)"	Jens De Vos	Live at the AFAS Live
2023	"Unleashed - Live at the AFAS Live"	Jens De Vos	Live at the AFAS Live
2023	"Consign to Oblivion - Live at the AFAS Live"	Jens De Vos	Live at the AFAS Live
2023	"Beyond the Matrix - Live at the AFAS Live"	Jens De Vos	Live at the AFAS Live
2023	"Code of Life - Live at the AFAS Live"	Jens De Vos	Live at the AFAS Live
2024	"The Ghost in Me (Danse Macabre)"	Martijn Bastiaans, Maurice Tromp	—N/a
2024	"The Ghost in Me (Live at The Symphonic Synergy)"	Jens De Vos	—N/a
2024	"Arcana"	Remko Tielemans	Aspiral
2024	"Arcana (Live at The Symphonic Synergy)"	Jens De Vos	—N/a
2025	"Cross the Divide"	Remko Tielemans	Aspiral
2025	"Sirens - Of Blood And Water (Live at The Symphonic Synergy)"	Jens De Vos	—N/a
2025	"T.I.M.E."	Dave Letelier	Aspiral
2025	"Aspiral (Live at The Symphonic Synergy)"	Jens De Vos	—N/a
2025	"Fight to Survive - The Overview Effect"	Remko Tielemans	Aspiral
2025	"Crimson Bow & Arrow (Live at The Symphonic Synergy)"	Jens De Vos	—N/a
2025	"Tides of Time (Live at The Symphonic Synergy)"	Jens De Vos	—N/a
2025	"Beyond the Matrix (Live at The Symphonic Synergy)"	Jens De Vos	—N/a

== Guest appearances ==
- "Happiness" (Alexis Jordan cover - released on October 9, 2012 on the album Acoustic Dance Sessions by various artists)
- "Sacred & Wild" (Powerwolf cover - originally from the album Preachers of the Night (July 19, 2013), released on July 20, 2018 on the "Communio Lupatum" of Powerwolf's album The Sacrament of Sin)
