= Retrospect (Epica album) =

2013 live album by Epica

Live album by Epica
- Released: 8 November 2013
- Recorded: 23 March 2013, at the Klokgebouw in Eindhoven, Netherlands
- Genre: Symphonic metal Power metal Gothic metal Neo-classical metal
- Length: approx. 175 min
- Label: Nuclear Blast
- Producer: Epica

Epica chronology
| Requiem for the Indifferent (2012) | Retrospect (2013) | The Quantum Enigma (2014) |

Professional ratings
Review scores
| Source | Rating |
|---|---|
| About.com | 4.5/5 stars |
| Lords Of Metal | 7.9/10 stars |

Retrospect is the third live album by Dutch symphonic metal band Epica in celebration of their tenth anniversary. The recorded live show took part in Eindhoven, Netherlands on 23 March 2013 at the Klokgebouw, and was sold out. Because of the great demand by international fans, Epica announced a live stream, called the Retrostream, on 4 March 2013. Epica performed on stage with the same orchestra that accompanied Epica in the recording of the live album The Classical Conspiracy: the 70-piece Extended Hungarian Remenyi Ede Chamber Orchestra and the Choir of Miskolc National Theatre. The expanded ensemble mostly played Epica songs, including a whole new song called Retrospect, especially written for this live show with the same name. Like on The Classical Conspiracy, Epica played some classical music, excerpts from operas and movie soundtracks, however not as many as on the aforementioned show. The album was released on CD, DVD and Blu-ray on 8 November 2013, through Nuclear Blast Records. Before the release of the show on Blu-ray and DVD, the show premiered at two movie theaters: Mathäser Multiplex Kino in Munich, Germany (6 November) and Service Bioscoop Zien in Eindhoven, Netherlands (7 November). On the day of the release, the show was shown in a Belgian movie theater: Kinepolis in Kortrijk, Belgium. The day after, the show was shown a final time in a movie theater: Cineteca Nacional in Mexico City (9 November).

== Track listing ==
CD 1
| No. | Title | Writer(s) | Length |
|---|---|---|---|
| 1. | "Introspect" | Coen Janssen | 4:20 |
| 2. | "Monopoly on Truth" | Isaac Delahaye/Mark Jansen/Simone Simons | 7:09 |
| 3. | "Sensorium" | Mark Jansen/Ad Sluijter/Coen Janssen/Simone Simons | 6:04 |
| 4. | "Unleashed" (Orchestral Intro from "This Is the Time" Single) | Simone Simons/Coen Janssen/Mark Jansen/Isaac Delahaye | 6:24 |
| 5. | "Martyr of the Free Word" | Ariën van Weesenbeek/Coen Janssen/Mark Jansen/Isaac Delahaye | 6:25 |
| 6. | "Chasing the Dragon" | Ad Sluijter/Yves Huts/Mark Jansen/Simone Simons | 8:09 |
| 7. | "Presto" (from "The Four Seasons") | Antonio Vivaldi | 3:08 |
| 8. | "Never Enough" | Ad Sluijter/Simone Simons/Yves Huts | 5:47 |
| 9. | "Stabat Mater Dolorosa" (from "Stabat Mater") | Giovanni Battista Pergolesi | 4:08 |
| 10. | "Twin Flames" (Live Premiere) | Mark Jansen | 5:03 |
| Total length: | | | 56:37 |

CD 2
| No. | Title | Writer(s) | Length |
|---|---|---|---|
| 1. | "Serenade of Self-Destruction" | Mark Jansen/Isaac Delahaye/Coen Janssen/Simone Simons | 10:10 |
| 2. | "Orchestral Medley" (Feint/Fools of Damnation/Mother of Light/Kingdom of Heaven/Run for a Fall/Deep Water Horizon) | Ad Sluijter/Coen Janssen/Mark Jansen/Simone Simons/Isaac Delahaye | 7:53 |
| 3. | "The Divine Conspiracy" (Anniversary Edition) | Ad Sluijter/Coen Janssen/Mark Jansen | 7:38 |
| 4. | "Delirium" | Coen Janssen/Isaac Delahaye/Simone Simons | 6:11 |
| 5. | "Blank Infinity" | Mark Jansen/Coen Janssen/Simone Simons | 5:04 |
| 6. | "The Obsessive Devotion" | Ad Sluijter/Mark Jansen | 7:57 |
| 7. | "Retrospect" (Unreleased Song, Live Premiere) | Coen Janssen/Sascha Paeth/Isaac Delahaye/Simone Simons | 4:28 |
| 8. | "Battle of the Heroes & Imperial March" (from Star Wars: Episode III – Revenge of the Sith and The Empire Strikes Back) | John Williams | 6:26 |
| 9. | "Quietus" (Silent Reverie) | Mark Jansen/Yves Huts/Coen Janssen/Ad Sluijter/Simone Simons/Jeroen Simons | 3:59 |
| 10. | "The Phantom Agony" | Ad Sluijter/Mark Jansen/Yves Huts | 9:22 |
| Total length: | | | 69:08 |

CD 3
| No. | Title | Writer(s) | Length |
|---|---|---|---|
| 1. | "Cry for the Moon" (Extended Drum Outro) | Mark Jansen/Ad Sluijter/Simone Simons | 12:23 |
| 2. | "Sancta Terra" | Mark Jansen/Ad Sluijter/Simone Simons | 5:50 |
| 3. | "Design Your Universe" | Mark Jansen/Isaac Delahaye/Coen Janssen | 11:10 |
| 4. | "Storm the Sorrow" | Coen Janssen/Simone Simons | 5:43 |
| 5. | "Consign to Oblivion" | Mark Jansen/Ad Sluijter | 9:44 |
| 6. | "Outrospect" | Coen Janssen | 3:57 |
| Total length: | | | 48:47 |

== Personnel ==
Epica

- Simone Simons – lead vocals
- Mark Jansen – lead & rhythm guitar, grunts, screams
- Isaac Delahaye – lead & rhythm guitar, backing vocals
- Rob van der Loo – bass
- Coen Janssen – synthesizer, piano
- Ariën van Weesenbeek – drums

Additional musicians

- Floor Jansen – vocals on "Stabat Mater Dolorosa" and "Sancta Terra"
- Ad Sluijter – lead & rhythm guitar on "Quietus"
- Yves Huts – bass on "Quietus"
- Jeroen Simons – drums on "Quietus"
- Tamás Kriston – violin on "Presto"

The Extended Hungarian Reményi Ede Chamber Orchestra

- Benjamin Almassy – violin
- Anna Bekes – violin
- Zoltan Ficsor – violin
- Boglárka Jobbágy-Balog – violin
- Szófia Kaulics-Nagy – violin
- Maria Császáriné Lazányi – violin
- Diana Pavliskó – violin
- Eva Siklosi – violin
- Eszter Szavári-Sovány – violin
- Tamás Kriston – violin
- József Kautzky – viola
- Anita Kiss – viola
- Tamás Tóth – viola
- Katalin Tressó – viola
- Angelika Beres – celli
- Hajnalka Csécsi – celli
- Kamilla Matakovics – celli
- Arpad Balog – double bass
- Peter Lokös – double bass
- Gyula Ács – clarinet
- Sandor Czimer – clarinet
- Istvan Molnar – trombone
- Daniel Négyesi – trombone
- Gyorgy Aranyosi – trumpet
- Peter Gal – trumpet
- Peter Lendvai – oboe
- Andrea Csécsi – oboe
- Janos Dobos – tuba
- Tamás Dömötör – timpani
- Istvan Halasz – bassoon
- Krisztian Jardany – bassoon
- Attila Kelemen – French horn
- Sándor Horváth – French horn
- Marianna Móri – flute
- Tamás Siklósi – flute
- Mark Viragh – percussion

The Choir of Miskolc National Theatre

- Anett Baranyai, Boglarka Jambrik, Edina Kecskemeti, Nóra Kiss, Zsuzsa Kurucz, Éva Mészáros, Erika Radnai, Eva Vajda, Dániel Gyetvai, Balázs Bodnár Richard Hegedüs, Andras Marton, Nándor Nagy, Balász Székely, Roland Tötös, Dóra Diána Horváth, Ágnes Jordanov, Diána Kuttor, Mariann Majláth, Éva Orth, Oxana Pacsenko, Annette Simon, Szófia Tarczali, Dávid Dani, Sandor Demeter, Gergely Irlanda, Balazs Kolozsi, Robert Molnar, Mihály Petrány

Production

- Zsolt Regos – conductor, choirmaster
- Jochem Jacobs – engineering, editing, mixing, mastering
- Sander van Gelswijck – engineering, editing, mixing, mastering
- Stefan Heilemann – art direction, design
- Tim Tronckoe – photography
- Jeroen Aarts – photography
- Evelyne Steenberghe – photography
- Marcel de Vré – director
