= Design Your Universe =

2009 studio album by Epica

Studio album by Epica
- Released: 16 October 2009
- Recorded: December 2008 – June 2009
- Studios: Gate Studio, Wolfsburg, Germany, The Huts Studio Antwerp, Belgium, The Iceman Studio, Ypres, Belgium,
- Genre: Symphonic metal
- Length: 74:50
- Label: Nuclear Blast
- Producers: Sascha Paeth & Epica

Epica chronology
The Classical Conspiracy (2009)	Design Your Universe (2009)	Requiem for the Indifferent (2012)

Singles from Design Your Universe
- 1. "Unleashed" Released: 25 September 2009; 2. "Martyr of the Free Word" Released: 30 October 2009

Design Your Universe is the fourth studio album by Dutch symphonic metal band Epica, released on 16 October 2009. It was the first album to feature officially new band members Isaac Delahaye on guitar and Ariën van Weesenbeek on drums.

A Gold Edition re-release of the album was released on 4 October 2019.

== Overview ==
=== Pre-release and production ===
The band entered Gate Studio in Wolfsburg, Germany on 2 March 2009 to start recording the album with usual collaborators Sascha Paeth, Amanda Somerville and Michael 'Miro' Rodenberg.

The band's previous album, The Divine Conspiracy, was dealing with the idea that God created many religions and that it was to man to understand that they are all the same, and this album will be dealing with the power of thoughts and imaginations, as Mark Jansen stated:

The album title, Design Your Universe, deals with new breakthroughs in quantum physics. It proves that we are all connected to each other on subatomic level. Also, it shows that we can create or at least influence matter with our thoughts… a very interesting fact. Because it changes everything for us, our whole worldview collapses once you accept these facts and integrate them in your lives. So this had to become the new album title.

Three songs of this album continue the A New Age Dawns saga, which started on the album Consign to Oblivion of 2005, and would later be continued in Aspiral from 2025. The sixth track on the album, and the fifth part of the saga, started the Kingdom of Heaven series, with parts two and three featuring on The Quantum Enigma and Omega respectively.

Sonata Arctica frontman Tony Kakko announced in an interview with La Grosse Radio.com that he would duet with Simone Simons on the album. His vocals for the song "White Waters" were recorded in Finland and later mixed with the other sound tracks.

The song "Resign to Surrender" was published on the MySpace website of the record label Nuclear Blast on 23 September 2009. and the video for "Unleashed" premiered on the band's MySpace site on 25 September 2009.

The bonus track "Incentive" is one of the very few Epica songs to not feature Simone Simons in any capacity.

== Reception ==
Professional ratings
Review scores
Source	Rating
About.com	4/5 stars
AllMusic	3.5/5 stars
Lords of Metal	(90/100)
Metal Storm	8.5/10 stars
Papel Mag	(favorable)

Reception has been positive from both critics and fans. The album debuted at No. 8 in the Dutch charts, being the highest position an Epica album had reached until that moment. The album remained on the chart for five weeks, and re-entered in No. 94 for one week due to the band's performance at the 2010 Pinkpop Festival.

== Design Your Universe World Tour ==
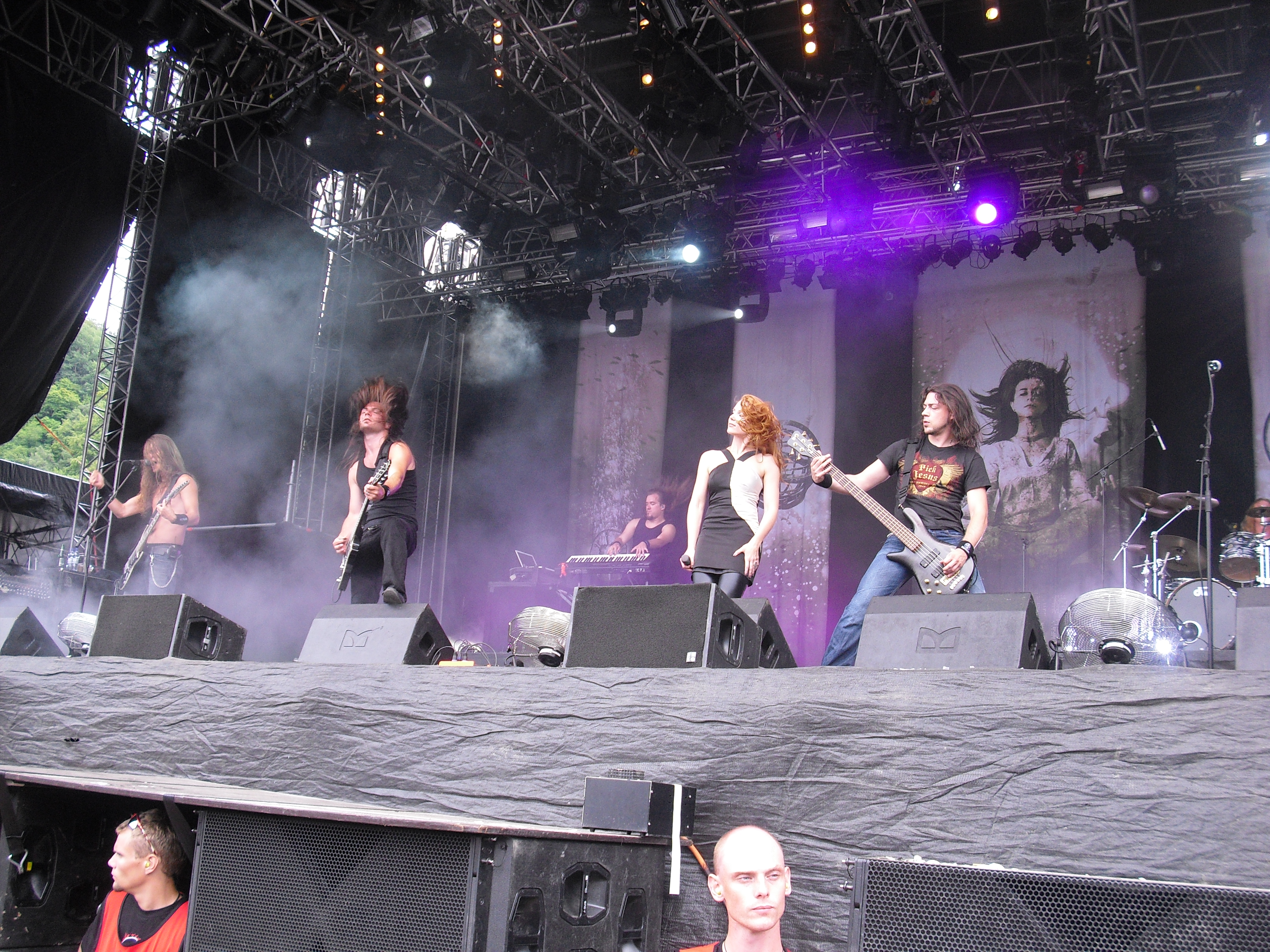
Epica performing at Norway Rock Festival in 2010.

After the release of Design Your Universe, Epica set out on a World Tour to support the album. They did a CD release party at The Paradiso in Amsterdam. They performed at some summer festival concerts in the summer of 2010 and returned to the United States and Canada in late fall 2010. Several dates in Europe, specially in the Netherlands, were sold out. The band also did a South American Tour, performing in Colombia, Brazil, Argentina, Chile, Peru, Bolivia and Uruguay. They played also in many important rock and metal festivals in Europe, such as Wacken Open Air, Pinkpop and Masters of Rock, in front of very large audiences.

== Track listing ==
No.	Title	Lyrics	Music	Length
1.	"Samadhi (Prelude)"	Mark Jansen	Jansen	1:27
2.	"Resign to Surrender (A New Age Dawns, Part IV)"	Jansen	Jansen, Jack Driessen, Simone Simons, Isaac Delahaye	6:19
3.	"Unleashed"	Simons	Coen Janssen, Jansen, Delahaye	5:48
4.	"Martyr of the Free Word"	Jansen	Ariën van Weesenbeek, Janssen, Jansen, Delahaye	5:03
5.	"Our Destiny"	Simons	Jansen, van Weesenbeek, Yves Huts, Simons, Delahaye	6:00
6.	"Kingdom of Heaven (A New Age Dawns, Part V)": I. "Hold in Derision"; II. "Children of the Light"; III. "Bardo Thödol"; IV. "Paragons of Perfection"; V. "The Harsh Return"	Jansen	Jansen, Delahaye	13:35
7.	"The Price of Freedom (Interlude)"	Instrumental	Janssen	1:14
8.	"Burn to a Cinder"	Simons	Janssen, Jansen, Delahaye, Simons	5:41
9.	"Tides of Time"	Simons	Janssen	5:34
10.	"Deconstruct"	Simons	Huts, Jansen	4:14
11.	"Semblance of Liberty"	Jansen	Jansen, Delahaye	5:42
12.	"White Waters" (featuring Tony Kakko)	Simons	Jansen, Simons, Delahaye	4:44
13.	"Design Your Universe (A New Age Dawns, Part VI)"	Jansen	Jansen, Delahaye, Janssen	9:29
Total length:				74:50

Limited and Gold Edition bonus track
No.	Title	Lyrics	Music	Length
14.	"Incentive"	Jansen	Jansen, Delahaye	4:14

iTunes bonus track
No.	Title	Lyrics	Music	Length
14.	"Unleashed (duet version)" (featuring Amanda Somerville)	Simons	Janssen, Jansen, Delahaye	5:50

Japanese edition bonus track
No.	Title	Lyrics	Music	Length
14.	"Nothing's Wrong" (Heideroosjes cover)	Heideroosjes	Heideroosjes	3:24

The Acoustic Universe - Gold Edition bonus disc
No.	Title	Lyrics	Music	Length
15.	"Burn to a Cinder"	Simons	Janssen, Jansen, Delahaye, Simons	5:32
16.	"Our Destiny"	Simons	Jansen, van Weesenbeek, Huts, Simons, Delahaye	5:13
17.	"Unleashed"	Simons	Janssen, Jansen, Delahaye	5:06
18.	"Martyr of the Free Word"	Jansen	van Weesenbeek, Janssen, Jansen, Delahaye	3:56
19.	"Design Your Universe (A New Age Dawns, Part VI)"	Jansen	Jansen, Delahaye, Janssen	8:21

== Personnel ==
Credits for Design Your Universe adapted from liner notes.

Epica

- Simone Simons – lead vocals
- Mark Jansen – rhythm guitar, grunts, screams
- Isaac Delahaye – lead guitar
- Yves Huts – bass
- Coen Janssen – synthesizer, piano, orchestral, choir vocals
- Ariën van Weesenbeek – drums, grunts, spoken word

Additional personnel

- Tony Kakko – clean vocals (male) on "White Waters"
- Sascha Paeth – backing vocals
- Simon Oberender – choir vocals
- Olaf Reitmeier – choir vocals
- Amanda Somerville – soprano vocals on "Unleashed (Duet Version)", backing vocals, choir vocals

Epica Choir

- Bridget Fogle, Cloudy Yang, Linda Janssen-van Summeren, Melvin Edmondsen, Previn Moore

Production

- Sascha Paeth – production, engineering, mixing
- Isaac Delahaye – engineering
- Yves Huts – engineering, orchestral arrangements on "Deconstruct"
- Simon Oberender – engineering, editing
- Olaf Reitmeier – engineering, editing
- Joost van den Broek – engineering
- Amanda Somerville – vocals production, engineering, vocal coaching, lyrical editing
- Mark Jansen – mixing, orchestral arrangements
- Brian Reese – orchestral arrangements (on "Tides of Time")
- Miro Rodenberg – mastering, orchestral arrangements
- Coen Janssen – choir arrangements
- Gjalt Lucassen – Latin translation
- Jaap Toorenaar – Latin translation
- Stefan Heilemann – artwork, cover art, art direction, design, photography
- Simone Simons – photography

== Charts ==
Country	Peak position
Austrian Albums Chart	70
Belgian Albums Chart (Flanders)	66
Belgian Albums Chart (Wallonia)	40
Dutch Albums Chart	8
Dutch Top 30 Alternative Chart	1
French Albums Chart	31
German Albums Chart	37
Japanese Albums Chart	228
Swiss Albums Chart	27
US Heatseekers	12
