= The Alchemy Project =

2022 EP by Epica

EP by Epica
- Released: 11 November 2022
- Recorded: April 2022
- Studios: Sandlane Recording Facilities, Rijen, Netherlands
- Genre: Symphonic metal
- Length: 35:54
- Label: Atomic Fire
- Producers: Joost van den Broek; Epica

Epica chronology
Ωmega (2021)	The Alchemy Project (2022)	Aspiral (2025)

Singles from The Alchemy Project
- 1. "The Final Lullaby" Released: 16 September 2022; 2. "The Great Tribulation" Released: 12 October 2022

The Alchemy Project is the third EP by Dutch symphonic metal band Epica. It features seven songs, all co-written and performed with guest artists. The lyrical content mainly deals with apocalyptic themes (with the exception of "Sirens - Of Blood and Water").

== Background, composition and release ==
The EP was announced on September 16, 2022 with the release of its first single, "The Final Lullaby" (featuring the band Shining). Rob van der Loo stated that the song was intended to be a "mash-up" between the two bands' sounds, for which he "would come up with some riffs that would be typical Shining and they would do the complete opposite". The band also teased that the EP would include the "heaviest death metal track we’ve ever recorded": "Human Devastation".

On the release date of the EP on November 11, 2022, the band also uploaded a music video for the song "Sirens - Of Blood And Water", which features both Charlotte Wessels and Amalie Bruun. The song stems from Simons and Wessels' shared fascination of The Little Mermaid, and is told from the perspective of the protagonist's sisters.

The album cover was designed by German visual artist Stefan "Heilemania" Heilemann.

== Track listing ==
The Alchemy Project track listing
No.	Title	Lyrics	Music	Length
1.	"The Great Tribulation" (featuring Fleshgod Apocalypse)	Mark Jansen; Simone Simons	Jansen; Simons; Francesco Paoli; Francesco Ferrini; Epica	5:03
2.	"Wake the World" (featuring Phil Lanzon and Tommy Karevik)	Lanzon; Simons; Epica	Rob van der Loo; Lanzon; Epica	6:11
3.	"The Final Lullaby" (featuring Shining)	Jørgen Munkeby; van der Loo; Epica	Munkeby; van der Loo; Ole Vistnes; Epica	5:12
4.	"Sirens - Of Blood and Water" (featuring Charlotte Wessels and Myrkur)	Wessels; Simons	Wessels; Simons; van der Loo; Epica	4:17
5.	"Death Is Not the End - The Remnants of War" (featuring Frank Schiphorst and Björn "Speed" Strid)	Jansen; Schiphorst	Jansen	5:14
6.	"Human Devastation" (featuring God Dethroned and Sven de Caluwé)	Ariën van Weesenbeek; Jansen	Henri Sattler; van Weesenbeek; Epica	2:57
7.	"The Miner" (featuring Asim Searah, Niilo Sevänen, and Roel van Helden)	Searah; van der Loo; Epica	van der Loo; Searah; Epica	6:57
Total length:				35:54

== Personnel ==
Epica

- Simone Simons – lead vocals
- Mark Jansen – rhythm guitar, grunts
- Isaac Delahaye – lead guitar, rhythm guitar, acoustic guitar
- Coen Janssen – keyboards, synthesizers, piano
- Rob van der Loo – bass
- Ariën van Weesenbeek – drums

Guest musicians

- Francesco Ferrini – orchestral arrangements (1)
- Francesco Paoli – grunts (1)
- Fabio Bartoletti – lead guitar (1)
- Veronica Bordacchini – clean vocals (1)
- Phil Lanzon – keyboards (2)
- Tommy Karevik – vocals (2)
- Jørgen Munkeby – vocals, rhythm guitar, tenor saxophone (3)
- Charlotte Wessels – vocals (4)
- Myrkur – vocals (4)
- Frank Schiphorst – lead guitar, rhythm guitar, orchestral arrangements (5)
- Björn "Speed" Strid – vocals (5)
- Henri Sattler – guitars, grunts (6)
- Sven de Caluwé – grunts (6)
- Asim Searah – vocals, lead guitar (7)
- Niilo Sevänen – growls (7)
- Roel Van Helden – drums (7)
- Marcela Bovio – backing vocals
- Linda Janssen-van Summeren – backing vocals

Choir – Kamerkoor PA'dam

- Maria van Nieukerken – choir director
- Martha Bosch, Frédérique Klooster, Annemieke Nuijten, Alfrun Schmidt – sopranos
- Karne Langnedonk, Cecile Roovers, Annemarie Verburg, Annette Vermeulen – altos
- Guido Groenland, Henk Gunneman, René Veen, Joost van Velzen – tenors
- Jan Douwes, Jan Hoffmann, Martijn de Graaf Bierbrauwer, Angus van Grevenbroek – basses
- Gjalt Lucassen, Jaap Toorenar – Latin translation

Strings

- Ben Mathot, Ian de Jong – 1st violin
- Loes Dooren, Sabine Torrico-Poiesz – 2nd violin
- Mark Mulder, Adriaan Breunis – viola
- Marije de Jong, Eilidh Martin – cello
- Robin Assen – strings scoring

Production

- Joost van den Broek – production, engineering, editing, mixing
- Jos Driessen – engineer, editing, mixing
- Darius van Helfteren – mastering
- Coen Janssen – choir scoring
- Stefan Heilemann – art direction, design, photography
- Sandra Ludewig – photography
- Chantik Photography – photography
- Simone Simons – photography
- Tim Tronckoe – photography
- Lotte Verdellen – photography

== Charts ==
Chart performance for The Alchemy Project
Chart (2022)	Peak position
Austrian Albums (Ö3 Austria)	60
Belgian Albums (Ultratop Flanders)	194
Dutch Albums (Album Top 100)	40
German Albums (Offizielle Top 100)	39
Swiss Albums (Schweizer Hitparade)	35
