= The Phantom Agony =

2003 studio album by Epica

Studio album by Epica
- Released: 5 June 2003
- Recorded: January–March 2003
- Studios: Gate, Wolfsburg, Germany; Vox, Hamburg, Germany
- Genre: Symphonic metal
- Length: 51:43
- Label: Transmission
- Producer: Sascha Paeth

Epica chronology
The Phantom Agony (2003)	Consign to Oblivion (2005)

Singles from The Phantom Agony
- 1. "The Phantom Agony" Released: 29 October 2003; 2. "Feint" Released: 8 January 2004; 3. "Cry for the Moon" Released: 13 May 2004

Professional ratings
Review scores
Source	Rating
AllMusic	2.5/5 stars
Scream Magazine	5/6 stars
Musical Discoveries	5/5 stars
Metal Ship	3.5/10 stars
Lords of Metal	9/10 stars
Metal Reviews	9/10 stars
Sea of Tranquility	4/5 stars

The Phantom Agony is the debut studio album by Dutch symphonic metal band Epica. It was released in 2003 by the Dutch label Transmission Records. It is the first album recorded by guitarist Mark Jansen after his departure from the band After Forever. On this album, Jansen continues with the collection of songs that make up The Embrace That Smothers. The first three parts can be found on Prison of Desire (2000), After Forever's debut album, and the following three parts can be found on The Divine Conspiracy (2007), Epica's third album. These songs deal with the dangers of organized religion.

The album was re-released on 23 March 2013, which coincided with Epica's 10th anniversary Retrospect show, as a 2-disc expanded edition by Epica's former record label Transmission Records.

== Track listing ==
All lyrics are written by Mark Jansen, except where noted.

The Phantom Agony track listing
No.	Title	Lyrics	Music	Length
1.	"Adyta (The Neverending Embrace)"	Simone Simons	Jansen	1:27
2.	"Sensorium"		Jansen; Ad Sluijter; Coen Janssen; Simons	4:47
3.	"Cry for the Moon (The Embrace That Smothers - Part IV)"		Jansen; Sluijter; Simons	6:44
4.	"Feint"		Jansen; Sluijter; Janssen; Simons	4:18
5.	"Illusive Consensus"	Simons	Jansen; Sluijter; Janssen; Simons	4:59
6.	"Façade of Reality (The Embrace That Smothers - Part V)"		Jansen; Sluijter; Simons	8:10
7.	"Run for a Fall"		Jansen; Sluijter; Janssen; Simons	6:31
8.	"Seif al Din (The Embrace That Smothers - Part VI)"		Jansen; Sluijter	5:47
9.	"The Phantom Agony": I. "Impasse of Thoughts"; II. "Between Hope and Despair"; III. "Nevermore"		Jansen; Sluijter; Yves Huts	9:00
Total length:				51:43

Japanese bonus track
No.	Title	Music	Length
10.	"Triumph of Defeat" (instrumental)	Janssen	3:56
Total length:			55:39

Mexican bonus track
No.	Title	Lyrics	Music	Length
10.	"Veniality"	Simons	Jansen; Sluijter; Janssen; Simons	4:36
Total length:				56:19

North American bonus track
No.	Title	Length
10.	"The Phantom Agony" (single version)	4:35
Total length:		56:18

2013 Expanded Edition – disc one (bonus tracks)
No.	Title	Length
10.	"Veniality"	4:37
11.	"The Phantom Agony" (single version)	4:33
12.	"Triumph of Defeat" (instrumental)	3:54
Total length:		64:49

2013 Expanded Edition – disc two
No.	Title	Music	Length
1.	"Adyta" (orchestral version)		1:28
2.	"Sensorium" (orchestral version)		4:53
3.	"Cry for the Moon" (orchestral version)		6:40
4.	"Feint" (orchestral version)		4:18
5.	"Illusive Consensus" (orchestral version)		5:02
6.	"Basic Instinct" (orchestral track)	Huts	4:07
7.	"Run for a Fall" (orchestral version)		6:26
8.	"The Phantom Agony" (orchestral version)		9:00
9.	"Veniality" (orchestral version)		4:35
10.	"Feint" (piano version)		4:53
11.	"Cry for the Moon" (single version)		3:30
12.	"Run for a Fall" (single version)		4:29
Total length:			59:21

== Personnel ==
All credits adapted from the original release.

Epica

- Simone Simons – lead vocals
- Mark Jansen – rhythm guitar, grunts, screams
- Ad Sluijter – lead guitar
- Coen Janssen – synths, piano
- Yves Huts – bass
- Jeroen Simons – drums

Additional musicians

- Olaf Reitmeier – acoustic guitars on "Feint" and "Run for a Fall", engineer
- Annette Berryman – flute on "Run for a Fall"

Production

- Sascha Paeth – producer, engineer, mixing
- Mark Jansen – orchestral arrangements
- Coen Janssen – orchestral and choir arrangements
- Robert Hunecke-Rizzo – orchestral arrangements
- Hans van Vuuren – executive producer, coordination and research
- Peter van 't Riet – mastering

Orchestra

- Thomas Glöckner – violin
- Andreas Pfaff – violin
- Tobias Rempe – violin
- Marie-Theres Stumpf – viola
- David Schlage – viola
- Jörn Kellermann – cello
- Cordula Rhode – cello
- Andrè Neygenfind – contrabass

Choir

- Melvin Edmonsen – bass
- Previn Moore – tenor
- Bridget Fogle – alto
- Cinzia Rizzo – alto
- Annie Goeble – soprano
- Amanda Somerville – soprano, vocal coach

== Singles ==
=== The Phantom Agony ===
"The Phantom Agony" was the first single.

==== Track listing ====
1. "The Phantom Agony" (Single Version) - 4:35
2. "Veniality" - 4:36
3. "Façade of Reality" - 8:17
4. "Veniality" (Orchestral Version) - 4:37

=== Feint ===
Feint was the second single.

==== Track listing ====
1. "Feint" - 4:18
2. "Feint (Piano Version)" - 4:53
3. "Triumph of Defeat" - 3:56
4. "Seif al Din" - 5:46

=== Cry for the Moon ===
"Cry for the Moon"

Single by Epica

from the album The Phantom Agony
- Released: 2003 (Sahara Dust demo), 13 May 2004
- Recorded: 2002–2003
- Genre: Symphonic metal
- Length: 6:44
- Label: Transmission
- Songwriters: Mark Jansen, Ad Sluijter, Simone Simons
- Producer: Sascha Paeth

Cry for the Moon was the third single. The song originated from a two-track demo released under the band name Sahara Dust, with the other track being a demo version of "Illusive Consensus".

==== Track listing ====
Demo

1. "Cry for the Moon" - 6:46
2. "Illusive Consensus" - 5:00

Single

1. "Cry for the Moon" (Single Version) - 3:33
2. "Cry for the Moon" - 6:44
3. "Run for a Fall" (Single Version) - 4:29
4. "Run for a Fall" - 6:31
