= Aspiral (album) =

2025 studio album by Epica

Studio album by Epica
- Released: 11 April 2025
- Genre: Symphonic metal
- Length: 61:12
- Label: Nuclear Blast
- Producer: Joost van den Broek; Epica

Epica chronology
The Alchemy Project (2022)	Aspiral (2025)

Singles from Aspiral
- 1. "Arcana" Released: 13 November 2024; 2. "Cross the Divide" Released: 30 January 2025; 3. "T.I.M.E." Released: 12 March 2025; 4. "Fight to Survive – The Overview Effect" Released: 11 April 2025

Aspiral is the ninth studio album by Dutch symphonic metal band Epica. The album released on 11 April 2025, and was announced on 30 January 2025.

The album resumed the "A New Age Dawns" series that was started on 2005's Consign to Oblivion and continued on 2009's Design Your Universe.

== Promotion ==
On 13 November 2024, Epica released their new standalone single "Arcana" after having performed the song at their Symphonic Synergy shows in the Netherlands in September.

On 30 January 2025, the album's second single "Cross the Divide" was released alongside a music video. The band announced that their new album Aspiral would be released on 11 April 2025, and was available for preorder.

On 12 March 2025, the band released the album's third single "T.I.M.E." (an acronym for "Transformation, Integration, Metamorphosis and Evolution") alongside an accompanying music video and an announcement of multiple worldwide tours in promotion of the album.

== Track listing ==
No.	Title	Lyrics	Music	Length
1.	"Cross the Divide"	Simone Simons	Rob van der Loo, Epica	4:18
2.	"Arcana"	Simons	Rob van der Loo, Epica	5:02
3.	"Darkness Dies in Light (A New Age Dawns, Part VII)"	Mark Jansen	Mark Jansen, Isaac Delahaye, Epica	7:59
4.	"Obsidian Heart"	Simons	Rob van der Loo, Epica	5:04
5.	"Fight to Survive – The Overview Effect"	M. Jansen	Delahaye, Epica	6:10
6.	"Metanoia (A New Age Dawns, Part VIII)"	M. Jansen	M. Jansen, Coen Janssen, Epica	7:17
7.	"T.I.M.E."	M. Jansen	M. Jansen, Delahaye, Epica	3:58
8.	"Apparition"	Simons	Delahaye, Epica	4:12
9.	"Eye of the Storm"	M. Jansen	Ariën van Weesenbeek, Delahaye, Epica	4:43
10.	"The Grand Saga of Existence (A New Age Dawns, Part IX)"	M. Jansen	M. Jansen, Delahaye, Epica	6:50
11.	"Aspiral"	Simons	Rob van der Loo, Epica	5:39
Total length:				61:12

== Personnel ==
=== Epica ===
- Simone Simons – lead vocals
- Mark Jansen – harsh vocals, rhythm guitar, orchestration
- Isaac Delahaye – lead guitar, backing vocals
- Rob van der Loo – bass
- Coen Janssen – keyboards, synthesizers, piano, orchestration
- Ariën van Weesenbeek – drums, backing vocals

=== Additional personnel ===
- Marcela Bovio – backing vocals
- Marjan Welman – backing vocals
- Linda Janssen-van Summeren – backing vocals
- Hedi Xandt – cover art
- Remko Tielemans – music video direction ("Arcana", "Cross the Divide" and "Fight to Survive – The Overview Effect")

== Charts ==
Chart performance for Aspiral
Chart (2025)	Peak position
Austrian Albums (Ö3 Austria)	8
Belgian Albums (Ultratop Flanders)	5
Belgian Albums (Ultratop Wallonia)	27
Dutch Albums (Album Top 100)	2
Finnish Albums (Suomen virallinen lista)	23
German Albums (Offizielle Top 100)	5
Scottish Albums (OCC)	40
Spanish Albums (PROMUSICAE)	79
Swiss Albums (Schweizer Hitparade)	7
UK Independent Albums (OCC)	7
