= The Quantum Enigma =

2014 studio album by Epica

Studio album by Epica
- Released: 2 May 2014
- Recorded: August 2013 – March 2014
- Studios: Sandlane Recording Facilities, Rijen, Netherlands
- Genre: Symphonic metal
- Length: 69:27 (standard); 92:40 (digipak); 162:03 (earbook)
- Labels: Nuclear Blast (Worldwide); Avalon Records (Japan/Korea)
- Producers: Joost van den Broek; Epica

Epica chronology
Requiem for the Indifferent (2012)	The Quantum Enigma (2014)	The Holographic Principle (2016)

Singles from The Quantum Enigma
- 1. "The Essence of Silence" Released: 15 March 2014; 2. "Unchain Utopia" Released: 4 April 2014

Professional ratings
Review scores
Source	Rating
About.com	4/5 stars
Exclaim!	7/10
Metal.de	9/10 stars
Metal Hammer	6/7 stars
Metal Storm	8.0/10
Metal Temple	9/10 stars
Ultimate Guitar Archive	8.3/10

The Quantum Enigma is the sixth studio album by Dutch symphonic metal band Epica. It was released by Nuclear Blast in Europe on 2 May 2014, in the UK on 5 May, and in the US on 6 May. It is their first studio album with new bassist Rob van der Loo, who replaced Yves Huts in 2012.

The album produced two singles: "The Essence of Silence" (released on 17 March 2014) and "Unchain Utopia" (released on 4 April 2014).

== Background and recording ==
After taking a break from the road due to the pregnancy of lead singer Simone Simons and the release of a new concert DVD, Retrospect the band started writing and recording of their sixth album. The album was produced by former After Forever keyboard player Joost van den Broek, recorded at Sandlane Recording Facilities in The Netherlands and mixed by Jacob Hansen. Simons went into the studio, when her son, Vincent, was only eight weeks old. "It was quite stressful for me. I was still breastfeeding, so I was mentally and physically exhausted, like the walking dead pretty much. And singing is very physically demanding. I had a strong schedule of ten days, every day for a couple of hours. We had a very regular schedule together with Joost [van den Broek, producer] and it was super-efficient. I was breast feeding and eating at the same time. Isaac, my mum and my husband would take turns in taking care of Vincent" explained Simons and added: "Of course, I write half the lyrics, Mark [Jansen] writes half the lyrics, and we have to know what we are writing about in order to get into that role, but we’ve been working together for so long so we kind of get each other’s brains, and a big change for me has been pregnancy; it transformed my voice, gave it more dimension. It has a new emotion that wasn’t there before."

In an interview with LiveReviewer, Epica guitarist Isaac Delahaye stated about the making of The Quantum Enigma: "It was very much our intention to really make songs. It was because we started with putting a lot of effort into the basics and we gave a lot of attention to the band part, more so than before. And, of course, Jacob Hansen mixed it and he knows how to do these things. We tried out several people and had them do a test mix of certain songs and he came out on top. It's become a heavy album, yet all the details are there. Previously, we used to go to the studio, tune our stuff and then we recorded an album. This time we did a long pre-production in the studio and we got to check out a lot of different combinations of amps and then we could record it. Previously, we just did everything in our home studios and sent each other the parts. And after that we would go into the studio and that's it. But now we sat down together and discussed a lot more, it was more of a band effort. It was working together, rather than reacting. Everyone brought songs to the table, which was very cool. With the previous album, it was mostly Mark, Coen and me writing a lot. And now even Ariën joined in and that made it all feel refreshing. It's odd to say, but it's kind of a new beginning."

Guitarist/vocalist Mark Jansen explains: "I have been listening to our new album and I can't get enough of it! It sounds more modern, but with all typical Epica elements inside. Refreshing might be the right word. This album has also been the result of a real group effort. It was great to see everyone being so motivated to create our best album! Even though the sound is more heavy (the guitars, bass and drums sound so brutal!!!), it's still a very catchy album as well. Some old influences from our earliest work, some references to Design Your Universe and some new elements." The band further commented: "Where Retrospect reflected on the first decade of our career, we’d like to think The Quantum Enigma marks the beginning of a new era, where Epica sounds heavy, modern and without compromises! Every detail finds its way into a perfectly balanced mix, and makes Epica sound raw and overwhelming."

== Concept ==
In an interview lead vocalist Simone Simons explained the main inspiration behind the album: "Well in quantum physics they have done this experiment and they found out that whenever you observe particles they take a certain shape – and when you are looking away, it’s a different shape – so in a way you can say you never know: ‘What is reality?’ We determine our reality through our observations, and if we would look away, reality would change. So the quest of finding out what is reality, what are illusions, is a topic that goes through all of the lyrics – life and death and everything in between. The power of the human mind has been the main source of inspiration for this record."

The album's cover artwork is done by Stefan Heilemann, who also did the cover artwork for the band's fourth and fifth albums and was designed to accompany the ideas behind the lyrics.

== Singles and music videos ==
On 17 March 2014, "The Essence of Silence" was released as a single and was made available for a digital download from iTunes, Amazon, Spotify, Deezer and other platforms. Three days later a lyric video was released on Epica's YouTube account. "Unchain Utopia" became the second single released on 4 April. In an interview with the webzine Sonic Cathedral, Simons confirmed that a video for "Unchain Utopia" was set to be released soon. However, a lyric video was released instead, which features footage originally filmed for the music video. On 30 October 2014 Epica premiered a new video for the track "Victims of Contingency". The video is directed by Remko Tielemans and produced by the Kunststoff Kollectiv, the same team responsible for Epica's highly acclaimed music video "Storm the Sorrow" from their previous album Requiem for the Indifferent.

== Tour ==
Simons and Delahaye premiered songs from the new album in an acoustic set at Vintage Vinyl, Fords, New Jersey on 7 April. The whole band reunited on stage on 30 April for an album release performance at 013 in Tilburg, The Netherlands, the first venue of The Quantum Enigma Tour. They went on tour through Europe, Asia, Africa and both South and North America and played 123 shows. On 3 June 2015 Epica announced the last venue for their tour in support of The Quantum Enigma to be 22 November 2015 at Klokgebouw in Eindhoven, the Netherlands and revealed that it was a part of the first edition of their very own festival Epic Metal Fest.

== Track listing ==
The album was released in five different versions: regular jewel case, 2-CD digipak, 3-CD earbook, double vinyl, and digital download.

Disc 1 (standard edition)
No.	Title	Lyrics	Music	Length
1.	"Originem" (Prelude)	Mark Jansen	Bob Katsionis, Epica	2:11
2.	"The Second Stone"	Simone Simons	Isaac Delahaye, Epica	5:00
3.	"The Essence of Silence"	Jansen	Ariën van Weesenbeek, Epica	4:47
4.	"Victims of Contingency"	Jansen	Jansen, Epica, Jack Driessen, Frank Schiphorst	3:31
5.	"Sense Without Sanity" (The Impervious Code)	Jansen	Jansen, Epica	7:42
6.	"Unchain Utopia"	Simons	Delahaye, Epica	4:45
7.	"The Fifth Guardian" (Interlude)		Delahaye, Coen Janssen, Michael Rodenberg	3:04
8.	"Chemical Insomnia"	Simons	Delahaye, Epica	5:12
9.	"Reverence" (Living in the Heart)	Jansen	van Weesenbeek, Epica	5:02
10.	"Omen" (The Ghoulish Malady)	Jansen	Jansen, Epica	5:28
11.	"Canvas of Life"	Simons	Janssen, Epica	5:28
12.	"Natural Corruption"	Simons	Delahaye, Epica	5:24
13.	"The Quantum Enigma" (Kingdom of Heaven, Part II)	Jansen	Jansen, Epica	11:53
Total length:				69:27

Bonus tracks
No.	Title	Lyrics	Music	Length
14.	"In All Conscience" (2xCD digipak exclusive bonus track)	Jansen	Rob van der Loo, Epica	5:04
15.	"Dreamscape" (3xCD earbook deluxe exclusive bonus track)	Simons	van der Loo, Epica	5:01
16.	"Memento" (Double vinyl exclusive bonus track)	Simons	van Weesenbeek, Epica	4:11
17.	"Banish Your Illusion" (iTunes/Amazon exclusive bonus track)	Jansen	Jansen, Epica	6:09
18.	"Mirage of Verity" (Japanese/Korean exclusive bonus track)	Jansen	van der Loo, Epica	5:59

Disc 2 (2xCD digipak and 3xCD earbook deluxe only) [acoustic versions]
No.	Title	Length
15.	"Canvas of Life"	4:51
16.	"In All Conscience"	4:16
17.	"Dreamscape"	4:11
18.	"Natural Corruption"	4:48
Total length:		18:08

Disc 3 (3xCD earbook deluxe only) [instrumental versions]
No.	Title	Length
19.	"Originem"	2:11
20.	"The Second Stone"	5:00
21.	"The Essence of Silence"	4:47
22.	"Victims of Contingency"	3:31
23.	"Sense without Sanity"	7:42
24.	"Unchain Utopia"	4:45
25.	"The Fifth Guardian"	3:04
26.	"Chemical Insomnia"	5:12
27.	"Reverence"	5:02
28.	"Omen"	5:28
29.	"Canvas of Life"	5:28
30.	"Natural Corruption"	5:24
31.	"The Quantum Enigma"	11:53
Total length:		69:27

== Personnel ==
Epica

- Simone Simons – lead and backing vocals
- Mark Jansen – rhythm guitar, grunts
- Isaac Delahaye – lead guitar, classical guitar, acoustic guitar
- Coen Janssen – synthesizers, piano
- Rob van der Loo – bass
- Ariën van Weesenbeek – drums, grunts, spoken word

Additional personnel

- Marcela Bovio – backing vocals
- Daniël de Jongh – additional male vocals (13)

Kamerkoor PA'dam

- Maria van Nieukerken – choir conductor
- Alfrun Schmid, Andreas Goetze, Angus van Grevenbroek, Annemieke Nuijten, Annette Stallinga, Annette Vermeulen, Astrid Krause, Daan Verlaan, Frederique Klooster, Jan Douwes, Karen Langendonk, Koert Braches, Martha Bosch, Ruben de Grauw, Silvia da Silva Martinho

Sandlane String Session

- Ben Mathot – violin
- Marleen Wester – violin
- Ian de Jong – violin
- Emma van der Schalie – violin
- Merel Jonker – violin
- Judith van Driel – violin
- Floortje Beljon – violin
- Loes Dooren – violin
- Vera van der Bie – violin
- Mark Mulder – viola
- Adriaan Breunis – viola
- Amber Hendriks – viola
- David Faber – celli
- Annie Tangberg – celli
- Jan Willem Troost – celli
- Thomas van Geelen – celli

Production

- Joost van den Broek – engineering, editing, vocal and orchestral arrangements, choir vocals
- Maarten de Peijper – sound engineer, choir vocals
- Jacob Hansen – mixing
- Tonnie Simons – artwork
- Stefan Heilemann – photography, artwork, design
- Jos Driessen – engineering, editing
- Darius van Helfteren – mastering
- Coen Janssen – choir arrangements
- Miro – orchestral arrangements
- Sascha Paeth – vocal line arrangements
- Gjalt Lucassen – Latin translations
- Jaap Toorenaar – Latin translations

== Chart positions ==
The Quantum Enigma debuted at 110 on the US Billboard 200, making it Epica's second entry on this chart, the previous being Requiem for the Indifferent in February 2013. In Epica's home country Netherlands, the album peaked at No. 4 making it their highest ranking album on the chart.

Chart (2014)	Peak position
Austrian Albums (Ö3 Austria)	30
Belgian Albums (Ultratop Flanders)	33
Belgian Albums (Ultratop Wallonia)	45
Dutch Albums (Album Top 100)	4
Finnish Albums (Suomen virallinen lista)	26
French Albums (SNEP)	47
German Albums (Offizielle Top 100)	11
Hungarian Albums (MAHASZ)	30
Japanese Albums (Oricon)	68
Scottish Albums (Official Charts)	55
Spanish Albums (Promusicae)	62
Swiss Albums (Schweizer Hitparade)	17
UK Albums (Official Charts)	53
UK Independent Albums (Official Charts)	9
UK Rock & Metal Albums (Official Charts)	2
US Billboard 200	110
US Independent Albums (Billboard)	17
US Top Hard Rock Albums (Billboard)	5
US Top Rock Albums (Billboard)	27
