= Consign to Oblivion =

2005 studio album by Epica

Studio album by Epica
- Released: 21 April 2005
- Recorded: July–October 2004
- Studio: Gate Studio, Wolfsburg, Germany
- Genre: Symphonic metal
- Length: 52:35
- Label: Transmission
- Producer: Sascha Paeth, Olaf Reitmeier

Epica chronology
The Phantom Agony (2003)	Consign to Oblivion (2005)	The Divine Conspiracy (2007)

Singles from Consign to Oblivion
- 1. "Solitary Ground" Released: 25 April 2005; 2. "Quietus (Silent Reverie)" Released: 28 December 2005

Professional ratings
Review scores
Source	Rating
AllMusic	3.5/5 stars
Lords of Metal	8/10 stars
Blabbermouth.net	6.5/10 stars

Consign to Oblivion is the second studio album by Dutch symphonic metal band Epica, and was released in 2005. The song "Trois Vierges" features a guest appearance by then-Kamelot vocalist Roy Khan. The album's lyrics are inspired by the Maya civilization. The phrase "In lak' ech, hala ken” expresses the concept of unity of Mayan thought, after which the song "Another Me (In Lack' Ech)" was named. The CD was released with copy control on it. This CD started a new collection of songs, called "A New Age Dawns". This saga was continued on the album Design Your Universe and was concluded on the album Aspiral.

Stylistically, the album is more focused towards orchestration than other Epica releases and features heavy use of a chorus. Additionally, Mark Jansen's death growls appear less frequently, occurring on only three songs, "Force of the Shore", "Mother of Light" and "Consign to Oblivion". But a bonus track, the Death cover "Crystal Mountain" includes grunts, and a grunt version of "Quietus" was released on the "Quietus (Silent Reverie)" single, making it five songs with grunts. A single with an acoustic version of the song "Solitary Ground" was extracted from the album The Score – An Epic Journey, released the same year.

The bonus cover of "Crystal Mountain" is one of the very few Epica songs to not feature Simone Simons in any capacity (although an "Orchestral version" featuring her vocals can be found on The Road to Paradiso, and the Quietus (Silent Reverie) single).

The album is the band's only release to date where Simone Simons' lyrical contributions outnumber those of Jansen.

== Track listing ==
No.	Title	Lyrics	Music	Length
1.	"Hunab K'u (A New Age Dawns, Prologue)"	Mark Jansen	Yves Huts	1:44
2.	"Dance of Fate"	Simone Simons	Jansen, Huts, Coen Janssen, S. Simons	5:13
3.	"The Last Crusade (A New Age Dawns, Part I)"	Jansen	Jansen, Huts, Ad Sluijter	4:21
4.	"Solitary Ground"	S. Simons	Janssen, Jansen, Sluijter, S. Simons	4:22
5.	"Blank Infinity"	S. Simons	Jansen, Janssen, S. Simons	4:00
6.	"Force of the Shore"	S. Simons	Jansen, Janssen, Sluijter, Huts	4:01
7.	"Quietus"	S. Simons	Jansen, Huts, Janssen, Sluijter, S. Simons, Jeroen Simons	3:45
8.	"Mother of Light (A New Age Dawns, Part II)"	Jansen	Jansen, Sluijter	5:55
9.	"Trois Vierges" (featuring Roy Khan)	S. Simons	Jansen, Janssen, S. Simons	4:40
10.	"Another Me "In Lack'ech" (Note: "In Lak’ech Ala K’in" is a traditional Mayan greeting, meaning "I am another yourself" or "I am you, and you are me")"	Jansen	Jansen	4:39
11.	"Consign to Oblivion (A New Age Dawns, Part III)"	Jansen	Jansen, Sluijter	9:45
Total length:				52:35

Bonus DVD
No.	Title	Length
1.	"Documentary"	23:30

Bonus CD tracks
No.	Title	Lyrics	Music	Length
12.	"Linger"	S. Simons	Huts, Jansen, Janssen, S. Simons	4:17
13.	"Palladium" (instrumental)		Huts	2:54
14.	"Crystal Mountain" (cover of Death)	Chuck Schuldiner	Schuldiner	5:03

== Personnel ==
Credits for Consign to Oblivion adapted from liner notes.

Epica

- Simone Simons – lead vocals
- Mark Jansen – rhythm guitar, grunts, screams
- Ad Sluijter – lead guitar
- Yves Huts – bass
- Coen Janssen – synths
- Jeroen Simons – drums

Additional musician

- Roy Khan – vocals on "Trois Vierges"

Orchestra

- Benjamin Spillner – violin
- Andreas Pfaff – violin
- Tobias Rempe – violin
- Gregor Dierk – violin
- Swantje Tessman – viola
- Patrick Sepec – viola
- Astrid Müller – viola
- Jörn Kellermann – cello

Choir

- Melvin Edmonsen – bass
- Previn Moore – tenor
- Andre Matos – tenor
- Annie Goebel – alto
- Amanda Somerville – alto, vocal coach
- Bridget Fogle – soprano
- Linda Janssen-van Summeren – soprano

Production

- Sascha Paeth – production, engineering, mixing, acoustic guitar on "Dance of Fate"
- Olaf Reitmeier – production, engineering
- Miro – orchestral arrangements, engineering
- Mark Jansen – orchestral arrangements
- Coen Janssen – orchestral and choir arrangements
- Yves Huts – orchestral arrangements
- Philip Colodetti – engineering, mixing
- Hans van Vuuren – executive production, coordination, research
- Peter van 't Riet – mastering
