= Requiem for the Indifferent =

2012 studio album by Epica

Studio album by Epica
- Released: 9 March 2012
- Recorded: September–November 2011
- Studios: Gate Studio, Wolfsburg, Germany, The Huts Studio Antwerp, Belgium, CFJ Studio, Oss, The Netherlands
- Genre: Symphonic metal
- Length: 72:51
- Label: Nuclear Blast
- Producers: Sascha Paeth & Epica

Epica chronology
Design Your Universe (2009)	Requiem for the Indifferent (2012)	The Quantum Enigma (2014)

Singles from Requiem for the Indifferent
- 1. "Storm the Sorrow" Released: 3 February 2012

Requiem for the Indifferent is the fifth studio album by Dutch symphonic metal band Epica. It was released on 9 March 2012. The album was the first to feature solos by keyboardist Coen Janssen, which very rarely occur on the band's other releases, and was the final album to feature original member Yves Huts on bass guitar.

== Background ==
=== Title ===
According to Mark Jansen, "This title refers to the end of an era. Mankind can no longer stick their head in the sand for the things that are happening around us. We are facing many challenges. There is an enormous tension between different religions and cultures, wars, natural disasters and a huge financial crisis, which is getting out of control. More than ever we will need each other to overcome these problems. As we are all connected. The universe, earth, nature, animals and human beings, this period in time will be the prelude to the end for those who still don't want to, or simply won't see it. A Requiem for the Indifferent but also a possibility for a new beginning with great new chances!"

== Reception ==
Professional ratings
Review scores
Source	Rating
About.com	3.5/5 stars
AllMusic	3.5/5 stars
Sonic Seducer	favourable

General response to Requiem for the Indifferent was positive. AllMusic stated that the album "is a typically elaborate and ambitious affair, incorporating copious amounts of choral work and classical arrangements into the band's neatly established blend of goth, progressive, power, and symphonic metal." Natalie Zed of About.com staff considers Requiem for the Indifferent "a transitional album for the band", which tries to expand their musical range experimenting with "weird" riffing and new combinations of vocals, while "losing none of the richness that has gained them fans."

== Track listings ==
No.	Title	Lyrics	Music	Length
1.	"Karma (Prelude)"	Mark Jansen	Jansen, Coen Janssen, Simone Simons	1:32
2.	"Monopoly on Truth"	Jansen, Simons	Isaac Delahaye, Jansen, Simons	7:11
3.	"Storm the Sorrow"	Simons	Janssen, Simons	5:12
4.	"Delirium"	Simons	Janssen, Delahaye, Simons	6:07
5.	"Internal Warfare" (Dedicated to the victims of the 2011 Norway attacks)	Simons	Jansen, Delahaye, Janssen, Frank Schiphorst, Jack Driessen	5:12
6.	"Requiem for the Indifferent"	Jansen	Jansen, Delahaye	8:34
7.	"Anima (Interlude)"		Jansen	1:24
8.	"Guilty Demeanor"	Jansen	Jansen	3:22
9.	"Deep Water Horizon"	Simons	Jansen, Delahaye, Janssen, Driessen	6:32
10.	"Stay the Course"	Jansen	Jansen, Delahaye, Simons	4:25
11.	"Deter the Tyrant"	Jansen	Delahaye, Jansen	6:37
12.	"Avalanche"	Simons	Jansen, Delahaye, Simons	6:52
13.	"Serenade of Self-Destruction"	Simons	Jansen, Delahaye, Janssen	9:52
Total length:				72:51

2xCD Boxed Set Deluxe & European Bonus Track
No.	Title	Lyrics	Music	Length
14.	"Nostalgia"	Jansen	Jansen	3:26
Total length:				76:17

North American Bonus Track
No.	Title	Lyrics	Music	Length
15.	"Twin Flames" (Soundtrack Version)	Jansen	Jansen	5:02
Total length:				81:19

iTunes/LP Bonus Track
No.	Title	Lyrics	Music	Length
16.	"Twin Flames" (Regular Version)	Jansen	Jansen	4:47
Total length:				86:06

Not Released Tracks
No.	Title	Lyrics	Music	Length
17.	"Deter the Tyrant" (Grunt Version)	Jansen	Delahaye, Jansen	6:37
Total length:				96:21

Disc 2 (2xCD Boxed Set Deluxe Only) [Instrumental Versions]
No.	Title	Length
1.	"Karma"	1:33
2.	"Monopoly on Truth"	7:10
3.	"Storm the Sorrow"	5:11
4.	"Delirium"	6:07
5.	"Internal Warfare"	5:12
6.	"Requiem for the Indifferent"	8:33
7.	"Anima"	1:25
8.	"Guilty Demeanor"	3:21
9.	"Deep Water Horizon"	6:32
10.	"Stay the Course"	4:26
11.	"Deter the Tyrant"	6:37
12.	"Avalanche"	6:52
13.	"Serenade of Self-Destruction"	9:51
Total length:		72:51

== Personnel ==
Credits for Requiem for the Indifferent adapted from liner notes.

Epica

- Simone Simons – lead vocals
- Mark Jansen – rhythm guitar, unclean vocals
- Isaac Delahaye – lead guitar
- Yves Huts – bass
- Coen Janssen – synthesizers, piano
- Ariën van Weesenbeek – drums, grunts

Additional personnel

- Amanda Somerville – backing vocals, vocal arrangements, lyrics editing, choir vocals

Epica Choir

- Christoph Drescher, Laura Macrì, Linda Janssen-van Summeren, Previn Moore, Tanja Eisl

Production

- Sascha Paeth – engineering, editing, mixing, vocal arrangements
- Simon Oberender – Gregorian voice on "Internal Warfare", engineering, editing, mastering
- Yves Huts – engineering
- Olaf Reitmeier – engineering, editing, vocal lines production
- Mark Jansen – orchestral arrangements
- Coen Janssen – orchestral & choir arrangements
- Isaac Delahaye – orchestral arrangements
- Miro – engineering, orchestral arrangements
- Gjalt Lucassen – Latin translation
- Jaap Toorenaar – Latin translation

== Editions ==
There was an error with all physical copies of the album's first edition, in which track 13, "Serenade of Self-Destruction", is an instrumental version without Simons and Jansen's vocal tracks. As compensation, Nuclear Blast Records decided to make the track (with the vocals) available as a free download. The glitch was corrected in the digipak versions. This instrumental version has a small part of vocals from Simone Simons at the very beginning, which makes it different from the total instrumental song released separately, on which you only hear the piano at the beginning.

To date there are nine different editions of the album:

- The standard edition features the 13 tracks above.
- The CD + shirt edition contains the standard edition of the album, along with a T-shirt in the size of choice.
- The digipak edition contains the standard album and the bonus track "Nostalgia".
- The 2-LP white vinyl edition is limited to 150 copies and contains an A2-sized poster.
- The 2-LP black vinyl edition, which contains an A2-sized poster.
- The mailorder edition, limited to 500 copies, contains a wooden box, which includes the limited digipak, an exclusive instrumental CD as bonus, artwork postcards and a certificate.
- The American edition features the 13 tracks above and the bonus track "Twin Flames" (soundtrack version).
- The 2-LP clear vinyl edition, which contains an A2-sized poster.
- The 2-LP instrumental black vinyl edition, which contains an A2-sized poster.

== Singles ==
=== Storm the Sorrow ===
On 3 February 2012, the band released on iTunes the single "Storm the Sorrow", characterized by melodic vocal lines and electronic influences. The video, shot in the middle of the same month in Amsterdam, was released on 24 April.

== Charts ==
Chart (2012)	Peak position
Austrian Albums Chart	33
Belgian Albums Chart (Flanders)	30
Belgian Albums Chart (Wallonia)	27
Czech Albums Chart	49
Dutch Albums Chart	12
Finnish Albums Chart	37
French Albums Chart	35
German Albums Chart	26
Japanese Albums Chart	172
Norwegian Albums Chart	37
Portuguese Albums Chart	36
Swedish Albums Chart	53
Swiss Albums Chart	14
UK Albums Chart	112
US Billboard 200	105
US Top Rock Albums	29
US Independent Albums	15
US Top Hard Rock Albums	7
