= Epica (band) =

Dutch symphonic metal band

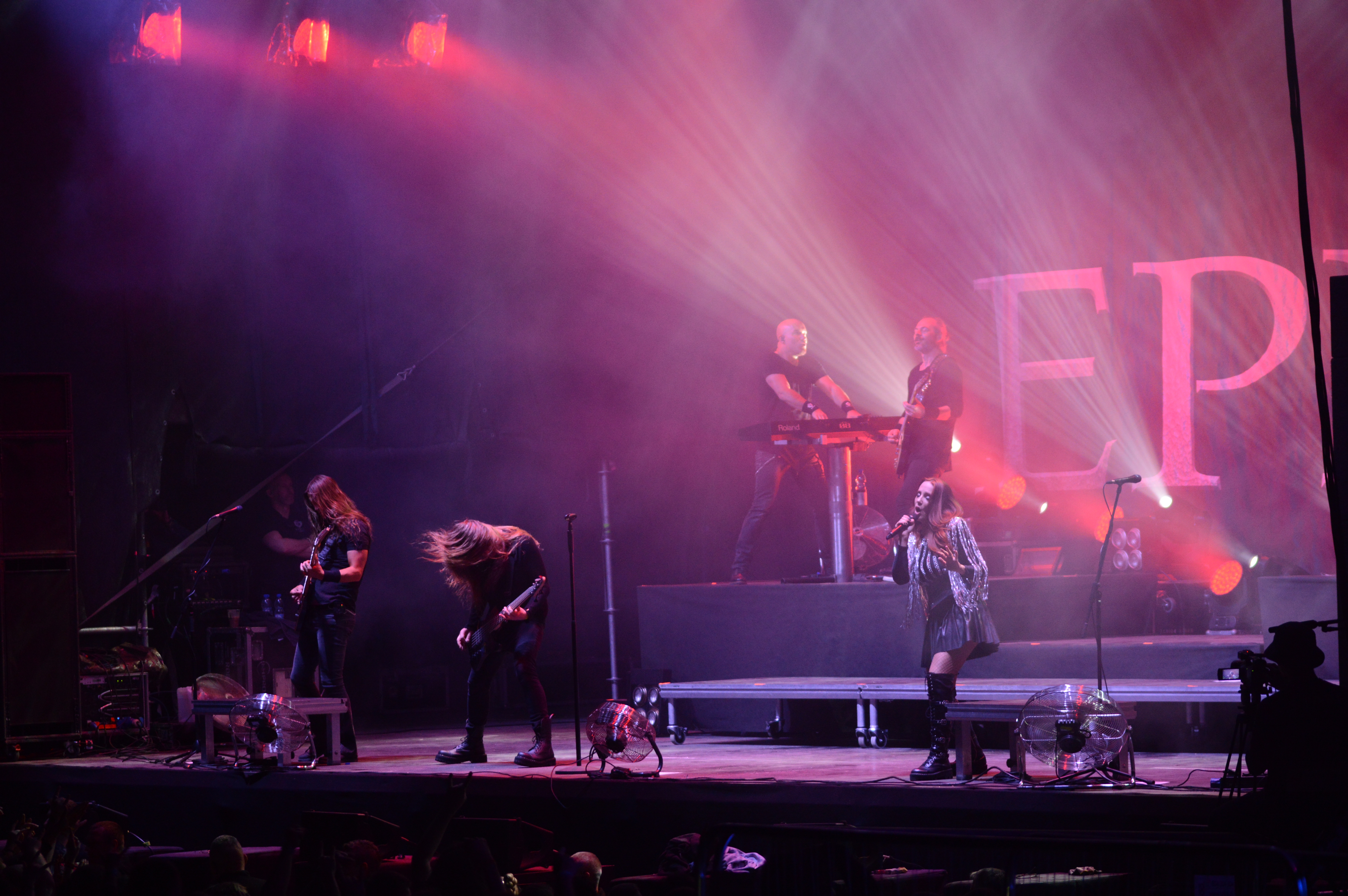
- Epica performing at the 2022 3-Majówka festival in Wrocław, Poland

Background information
- Also known as: Sahara Dust (2002)
- Origin: Reuver, Limburg, Netherlands
- Genre: Symphonic metal
- Years active: 2002–present
- Labels: Transmission, Nuclear Blast, Atomic Fire
- Spinoff of: After Forever
- Members: Mark Jansen; Coen Janssen; Simone Simons; Ariën van Weesenbeek; Isaac Delahaye; Rob van der Loo
- Past members: Yves Huts; Ad Sluijter; Helena Michaelsen; Jeroen Simons
- Website: www.epica.nl

Epica is a Dutch symphonic metal band founded by guitarist and vocalist Mark Jansen after his departure from After Forever. Originally formed as a symphonic metal band with gothic influences, Epica later incorporated strong death metal elements into their sound. Starting with their third album, progressive metal influences also became evident. Additionally, the band often incorporates thrash metal and groove metal riffs, black metal elements (particularly in drumming techniques), power metal sections, and influences from Arabic music. Some songs also incorporate electronic elements, djent transitions, and folk metal melodies inspired by Middle Eastern, Chinese, and Celtic traditions.

Epica is also known for its attention to vocal melodies, which contrast with the heavy instrumentation by weaving catchy, sophisticated, and emotionally expressive lines. The band's sound prominently features a combination of soprano vocals, performed by Simone Simons, and growled vocals, provided by Mark Jansen. They primarily write their own lyrics, which explore philosophical, psychological, spiritual, moral, scientific, environmental, socio-political, global, topical, and personal themes. Epica is also recognized for its extensive use of orchestral arrangements and operatic choirs.

In 2003, Epica released its debut album, The Phantom Agony, through Transmission Records. Consign to Oblivion followed in 2005, debuting at No. 12 on the Dutch charts. After Transmission's bankruptcy, the band signed with Nuclear Blast and released its third studio album, The Divine Conspiracy, in 2007, which charted at No. 9 in the Netherlands. Design Your Universe (2009) brought the band even greater success, debuting at No. 8 on the Dutch Albums Chart and charting across Europe, while also receiving widespread critical acclaim. Epica's fifth studio album, Requiem for the Indifferent, was released in 2012. Well received by critics, it achieved international success, entering the US Billboard 200 at No. 104 and Japan's Oricon Albums Chart at No. 172.

At the beginning of May 2014, the band released their sixth album, The Quantum Enigma, which was a huge international success, debuting at No. 110 on the US Billboard 200 and peaking at No. 4 in Epica's homeland of the Netherlands. In June 2015, Epica was awarded the Music Export Award, which is given to the Dutch act with the most international success in the past year. Their seventh album, The Holographic Principle, was released in September 2016 to continued international success, matching the peak chart position set by its predecessor in the Netherlands. The band released their ninth album, Aspiral, in April 2025.

== History ==
=== Cry for the Moon (2002) ===
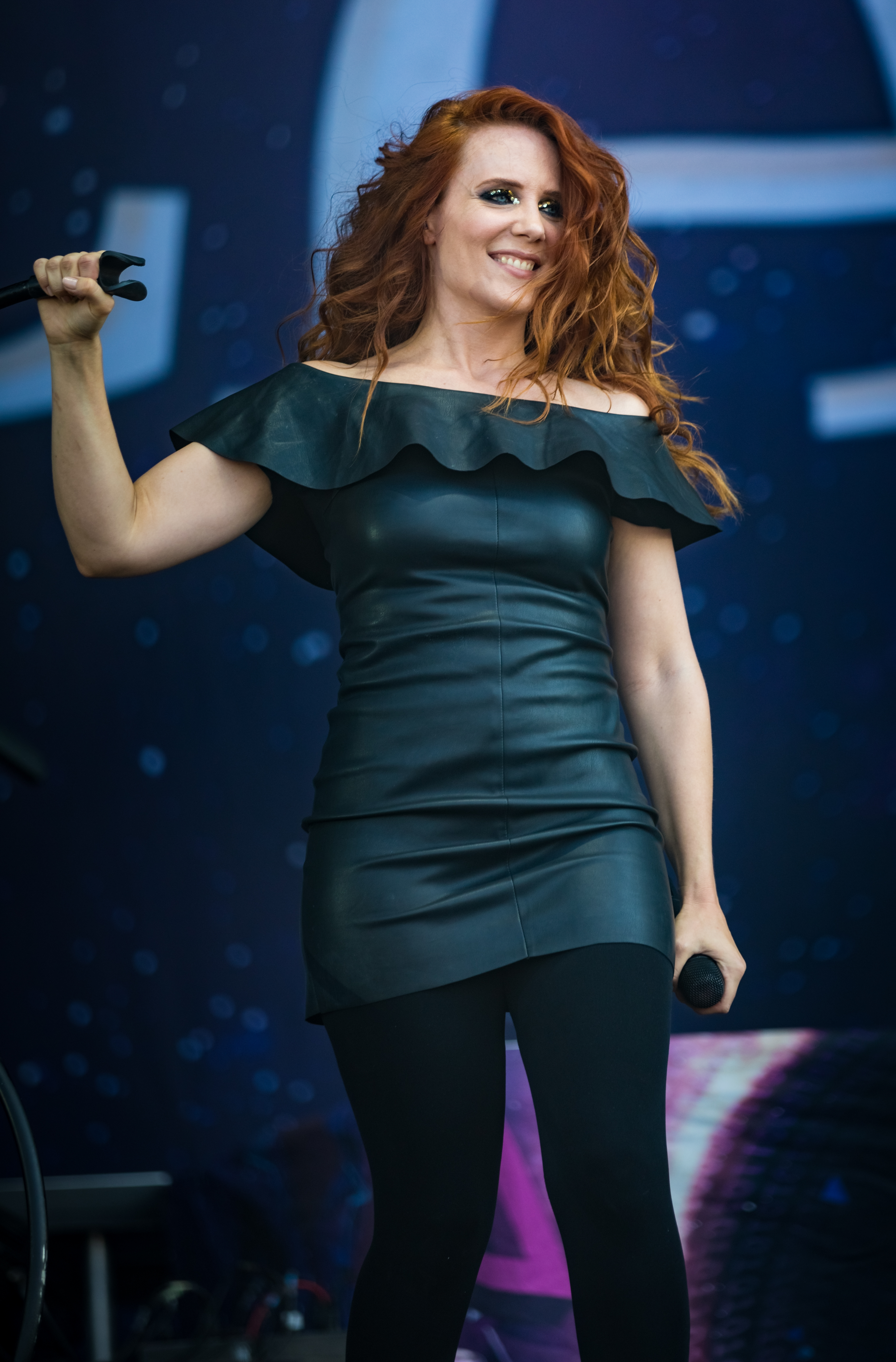
Simone Simons, Epica's lead singer and frontwoman

In early 2002, at 23 years old, Mark Jansen left After Forever due to creative differences. He then began searching for musicians to create a more classical/symphonic music project, initially named Sahara Dust. In late 2002, the band approached Helena Iren Michaelsen (from Trail of Tears) to be its frontwoman, but she was soon replaced by Simone Simons, who was Jansen's girlfriend at the time. The band's lineup was completed by guitarist Ad Sluijter, drummer Jeroen Simons, bassist Yves Huts, and keyboardist Coen Janssen. The name was later changed to Epica, inspired by Kamelot's album of the same name.

Epica then assembled a choir (consisting of two men and four women) and a string orchestra (comprising three violins, two violas, two cellos, and an upright bass) to perform with them. Still under the name Sahara Dust, they produced a two-song demo titled Cry for the Moon in 2002. As a result, they were signed to Transmission Records.

=== The Phantom Agony (2002–2004) ===
The Phantom Agony is the first full-length studio album by Epica. It is the first album recorded by guitarist Mark Jansen after his departure from the band After Forever. The album was produced by Sascha Paeth (known for having produced bands such as Angra, Rhapsody of Fire, and Kamelot) and released in June 2003. In this album, Mark Jansen continues the collection of songs that make up "The Embrace That Smothers." The first three parts can be found on Prison of Desire (2000), After Forever's debut album, and the following three parts can be found on The Divine Conspiracy (2007), Epica's third album. These songs address the dangers of organized religion. The song "Façade of Reality" on the album was written about the September 11 attacks and includes fragments from speeches by Tony Blair.

The album was followed by three singles: “The Phantom Agony,” “Feint,” and “Cry for the Moon.”

=== Consign to Oblivion/The Score – An Epic Journey (2004–2006) ===
Their second release, entitled Consign to Oblivion, was influenced by the culture of the Maya civilization, which can be noticed on songs in the "A New Age Dawns" series. "A New Age Dawns" refers to the time system of the Mayan people, which extends up to 2012, and makes no reference to what may happen past that year. Consign to Oblivion was composed with film scores as a basis, with Hans Zimmer and Danny Elfman cited as major inspirations. The album features guest vocals by Roy Khan (from Kamelot) on the song "Trois Vierges." Epica also joined Kamelot as a support band on parts of their tour to promote The Black Halo album, to which Simons had contributed her vocals on the track "The Haunting (Somewhere in Time)."

Two singles were released from the album, "Solitary Ground" and "Quietus."

Epica's non-metal album The Score – An Epic Journey was released in September 2005 and is the soundtrack for a Dutch movie called Joyride, though it could also be considered their third album. Mark Jansen describes the album as typical Epica, "only without the singing, without the guitars, no bass, and no drums."

In 2005 and 2006, Epica went on their first tour throughout North America with Kamelot. After the tour, drummer Jeroen Simons left the band to pursue other musical interests. In Fall 2006, Simone once again contributed vocals to a Kamelot album, this time on the tracks "Blücher" and "Season's End" from the album Ghost Opera. In December, Ariën van Weesenbeek from God Dethroned was announced via Epica's official website as the guest drummer for their new album, but not as a permanent band member.

=== The Divine Conspiracy/The Classical Conspiracy (2006–2009) ===
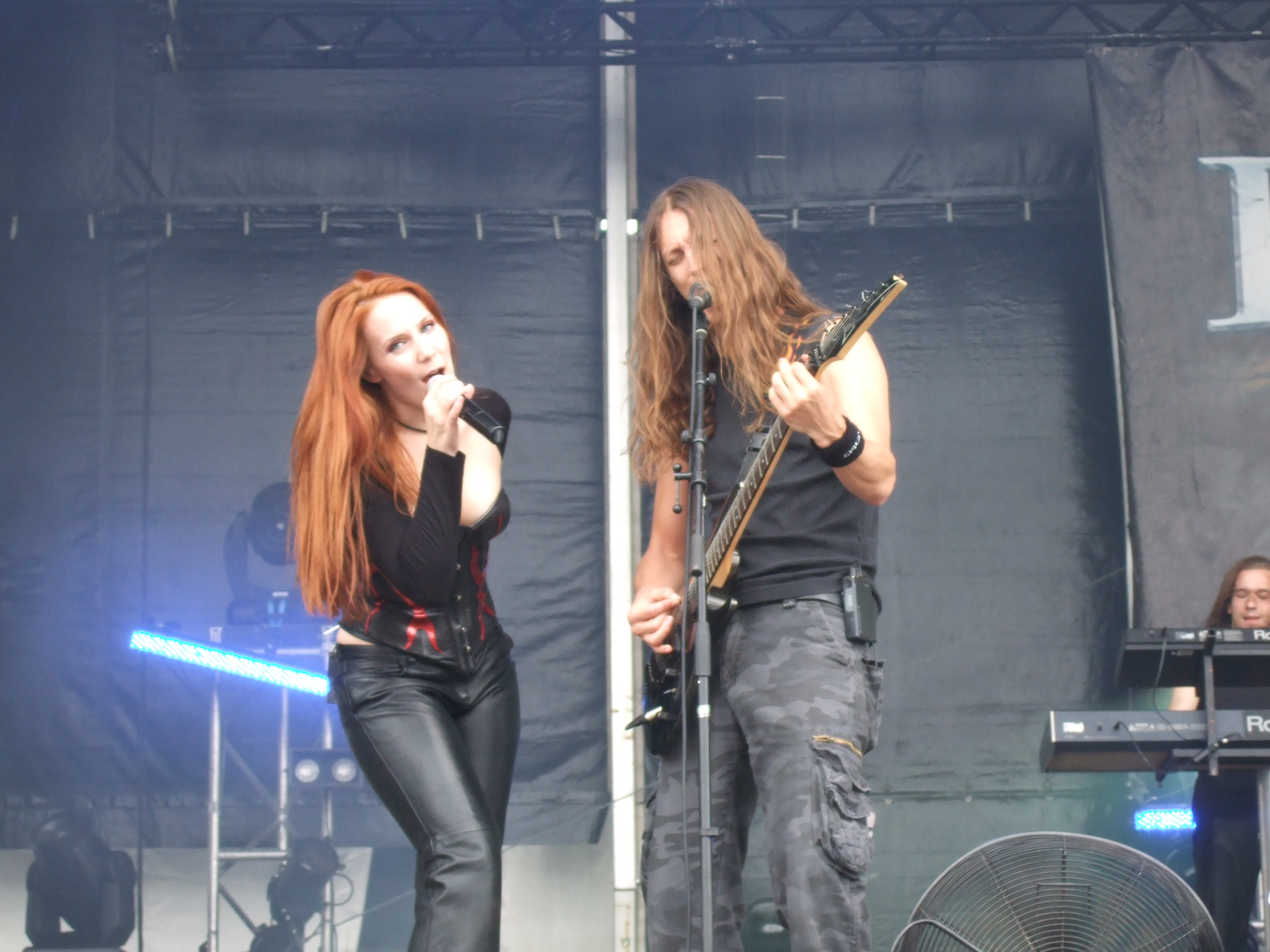
Lead vocalist Simone Simons and Grunt vocalist and guitarist Mark Jansen during The Divine Conspiracy World Tour.

In September 2007, Epica headlined their first tour through North America and released their third album, The Divine Conspiracy, this time under a new label, Nuclear Blast. That December, Ariën van Weesenbeek was announced as Epica's permanent new drummer. The band toured North America again in April 2008 with Into Eternity and Symphony X, this time with Amanda Somerville filling in for Simone Simons, who had contracted a staph infection (MRSA). The album was released on 7 September 2007 through Nuclear Blast in Europe.

The concept behind The Divine Conspiracy is that God created many different religions for humanity to discover and overcome in order to realize that, in essence, they were all the same. This theme is encapsulated in the album title, "The Divine Conspiracy." Additionally, the album concludes the Embrace That Smothers saga, which began in After Forever's Prison of Desire (Prologue and parts I-III) and continued in Epica's The Phantom Agony (parts IV-VI). In total, The Embrace That Smothers is a series of 10 songs (Prologue and parts I-IX) exploring the dangers of organized religion.

The first single from the album, "Never Enough," was released on 10 August 2007, accompanied by a music video. The second single, "Chasing the Dragon," was released in 2008 without an accompanying video.

On 16 December 2008, Ad Sluijter left the band, citing frustration over being unable to enjoy composing music due to deadlines. His successor on guitar, Isaac Delahaye, was announced in January 2009. Isaac was a member of God Dethroned.

Also in 2008, Epica recorded The Classical Conspiracy, their first live album. The live performance took place in Miskolc, Hungary, on 14 June 2008, as part of the Miskolc Opera Festival, where Therion had performed a similar show the year before. The show featured a 40-piece orchestra and a 30-piece choir, and the setlist included not only Epica's own songs but also covers of classical pieces by Antonio Vivaldi, Antonín Dvořák, Giuseppe Verdi, Edvard Grieg, and soundtracks from movies like Star Wars, Spider-Man, and Pirates of the Caribbean. The live album was released on 8 May 2009 through Nuclear Blast Records.

=== Design Your Universe (2008–2010) ===
Epica – Design Your Universe
A sample from Design Your Universe which demonstrates Epica's use of grunts and a choir

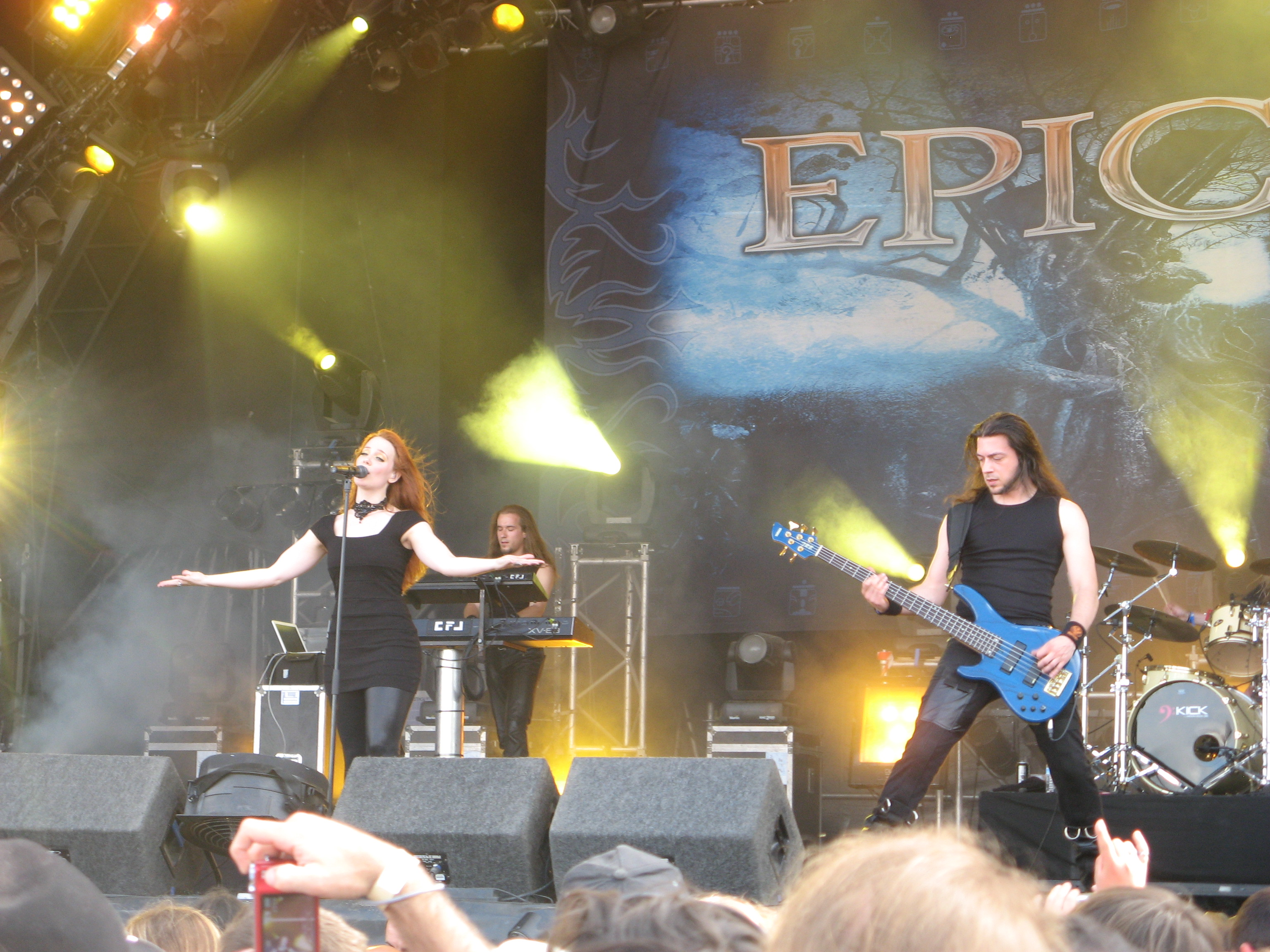
Epica performing in 2009

On 4 March 2009, Epica announced their return to the studio, where they would begin recording a new album. In April 2009, it was revealed that the new album's title would be Design Your Universe. It continued the A New Age Dawns saga, which began on Consign to Oblivion. The album was released on 16 October 2009. To promote the release, they performed in Amsterdam at Paradiso on 10 October 2009. This is the first Epica album to feature Isaac Delahaye. The record also includes a guest appearance from Sonata Arctica vocalist Tony Kakko on the song "White Waters." Reception has been positive from both critics and fans. The album debuted at No. 8 on the Dutch charts, marking the highest position an Epica album has ever reached. The album remained on the chart for five weeks and re-entered at No. 94 for one week following the band's performance at the 2010 Pinkpop Festival. On 31 December 2009, it was announced through their website that a single would be released. The song is called "This Is the Time," and all profits went to World Wide Fund for Nature. After the release of Design Your Universe, Epica embarked on a World Tour to support the album. They held a CD release party at The Paradiso in Amsterdam, performed at several summer festivals in 2010, and returned to the United States and Canada in late fall 2010. Several dates in Europe, especially in the Netherlands, were sold out. The band also toured South America, performing in Brazil, Argentina, Chile, Peru, Bolivia, and Uruguay. They played at many major rock and metal festivals in Europe, such as Wacken Open Air, Pinkpop, and Masters of Rock, in front of very large audiences.

=== Requiem for the Indifferent and Retrospect (2011–2013) ===
In an interview in November 2010, Simone stated that the band would begin writing music around February 2011, after their Latin American tour concluded. She also mentioned that they were aiming for a release in the first quarter of 2012. By May 2011, 14 tracks had been written without lyrics. The band entered the studio later that year, with Sascha Paeth once again serving as the producer.

On December 1, the band announced that the album would be titled Requiem for the Indifferent and would be inspired by factors such as the enormous tension between different religions and cultures, wars, natural disasters, and the financial crisis. The album was released on 9 March 2012 in Europe, and on 13 March 2012 in the United States. On 25 March 2012, Epica announced on their website that original bassist Yves Huts had parted ways with the band and was replaced by Rob van der Loo (ex-Delain, MaYaN). On April 24, the music video for Storm the Sorrow was officially released, earning 128,000 views on YouTube on the release day. General response to Requiem for the Indifferent was positive. AllMusic stated that the album "is a typically elaborate and ambitious affair, incorporating copious amounts of choral work and classical arrangements into the band's neatly established blend of goth, progressive, power, and symphonic metal." Natalie Zed of About.com considered Requiem for the Indifferent "a transitional album for the band," which attempts to expand their musical range by experimenting with "weird" riffing and new combinations of vocals while "losing none of the richness that has gained them fans."

On 16 September 2012, the band made a guest appearance on the Dutch TV show Niks te gek (translation: "Nothing [is] too crazy"), where mentally disabled people (18 years or older) can have their wishes granted. In the episode, they recorded, together with the autistic Ruurd Woltring, one of his own compositions, "Forevermore". The single was released through Nuclear Blast on 25 September 2012.

The band announced on their official website that on 23 March 2013, they would celebrate the 10th anniversary of Epica in Eindhoven, Netherlands. The concert, titled Retrospect, would be held at Klokgebouw with a 70-piece orchestra, choirs, international guests, and many special effects. The band invited the Hungarian Remenyi Ede Chamber Orchestra and the Choir of Miskolc National Theatre to this show, as they were the same orchestra that accompanied Epica during the recording of the live album The Classical Conspiracy. The concert consisted of a 70-piece orchestra, special effects, acrobatics, guest vocalist Floor Jansen (Nightwish) and former band members Ad Sluijter, Yves Huts, and Jeroen Simons. Finnish singer Tarja Turunen was also invited to the show but had to decline due to scheduling problems. In the show, the band introduced a new song titled "Retrospect" and played "Twin Flames" from Requiem for the Indifferent for the first time. They also played for the second time their longest song "The Divine Conspiracy," although a shorter version of the song was performed. During the concert, Coen Janssen announced that Retrospect would be filmed for release as a DVD.

=== The Quantum Enigma and Epic Metal Fest (2013–2015) ===
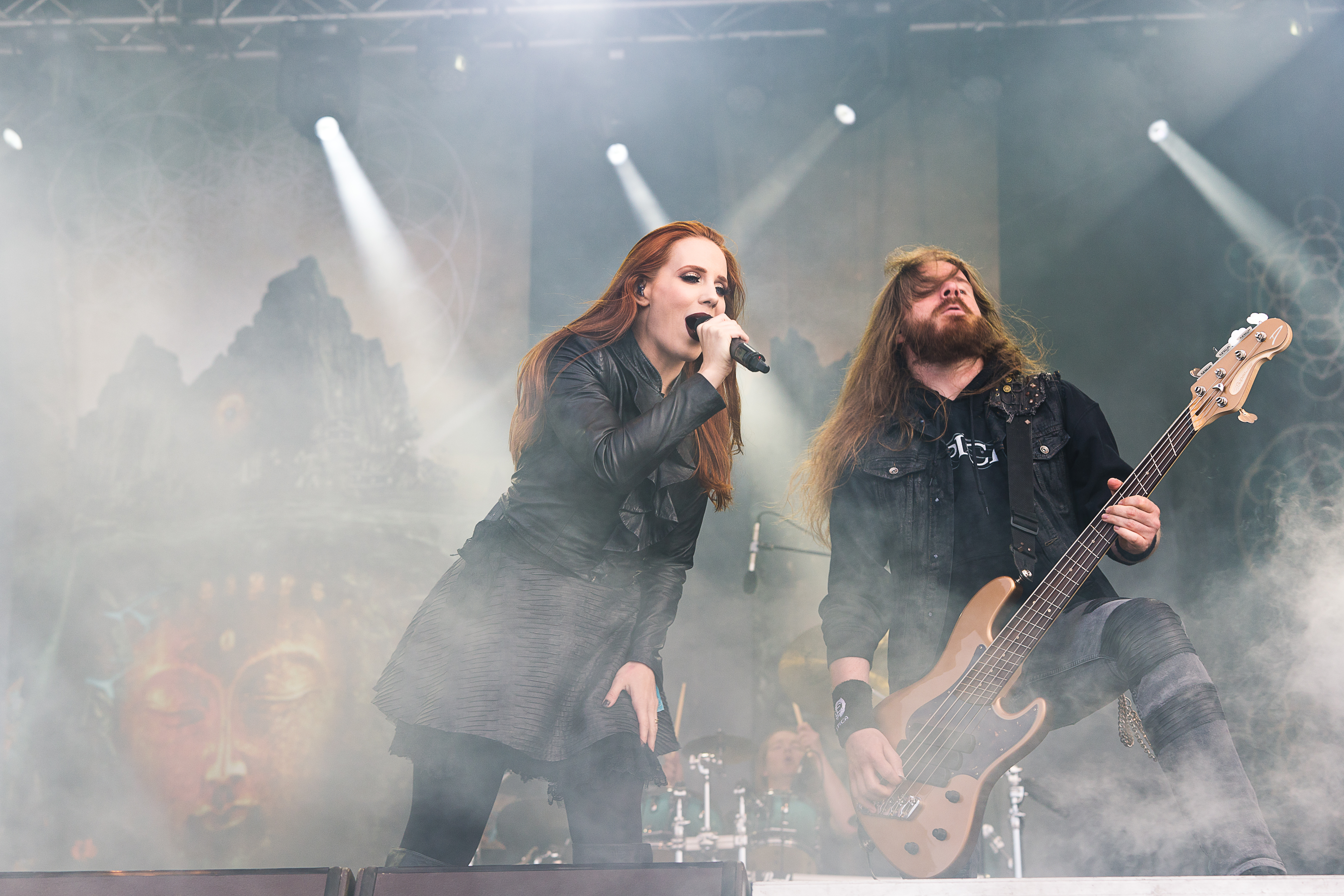
Simons and Van der Loo during The Ultimate Enigma Tour

Epica revealed on their official website the first details about their sixth album on 5 February 2014. It was announced that the new album would be titled The Quantum Enigma and would be released at the beginning of May 2014. Later that same month, the band unveiled the album's cover art, which was created by longtime collaborator Stefan Heilemann to reflect the ideas behind the lyrics. Track listing and release dates were announced the same day as well, and eventually, The Quantum Enigma was released by Nuclear Blast on 2 May (Europe), 5 May (UK), and 13 May (USA). The album was produced by Joost van den Broek and recorded in the Sandlane Recording Facilities in The Netherlands. The Quantum Enigma debuted at 110 on US Billboard 200, making it Epica's second entry on this chart, the first being Requiem for the Indifferent, which charted in February 2013. In Epica's home country, the Netherlands, the album peaked at No. 4, marking it their highest ranking album on the chart.

The band stated that, "Where Retrospect reflected on the first decade of our career, we'd like to think The Quantum Enigma marks the beginning of a new era, where Epica sounds heavy, modern, and without compromises! More than ever, the creation of this album was a group effort, and we are extremely proud of the results! Every detail finds its way into a perfectly balanced mix and makes Epica sound raw and overwhelming."

On 17 March 2014, the first single, "The Essence of Silence," was made available as a digital download. Three days later, a lyric video was released. "Unchain Utopia" was chosen as the second single and released on 8 April 2014. In an interview with the Sonic Cathedral Webzine, lead vocalist Simone Simons confirmed that a music video for "Unchain Utopia" was set to be released soon. However, a lyric video was released instead, featuring footage originally filmed for the music video. Later, the band decided to film a music video for the track "Victims of Contingency," which was released on 30 October 2014.

The band returned to the stage after almost a year on 30 April 2013, in Tilburg in their home country, The Netherlands, marking the album release show. Throughout 2014 and 2015, the band toured Europe, Asia, Africa, and both South and North America in support of The Quantum Enigma. Their last venue before returning to the studio took place on 22 November 2015 at the "Klokgebouw" in Eindhoven, the Netherlands, where Epica had held their Retrospect venue. The show was part of the first edition of "Epic Metal Fest," a festival organized and curated by the members of the band. Epica announced Epic Metal Fest on 3 June 2015 on their official website and revealed that they would be joined at the festival by bands DragonForce, Eluveitie, Fear Factory, Moonspell, Delain, and Periphery. The frontwoman Simone Simons further commented: "It was a long-cherished dream of Epica to host our own festival and we are very proud to be able to present an absolutely awesome array of international metal acts. This day will surely be the next highlight in our career and we hope to be able to share it with all of you!"

On 5 June 2015, Epica was awarded the Music Export Award at Buma Rocks, which is given to the Dutch act with the most international success in the past year. The band's guitarist/vocalist Mark Jansen thanked the band's fans through their official website: "We are honored with this prestigious award, it’s a big achievement after all those years of investing countless hours and much energy into Epica. It shows that everything you do by following your heart will eventually pay off and will get acknowledged. Thanks to all our fans from all over the world!"

=== The Holographic Principle, EPs, first book and Design Your Universe 10th Anniversary (2016–2019) ===
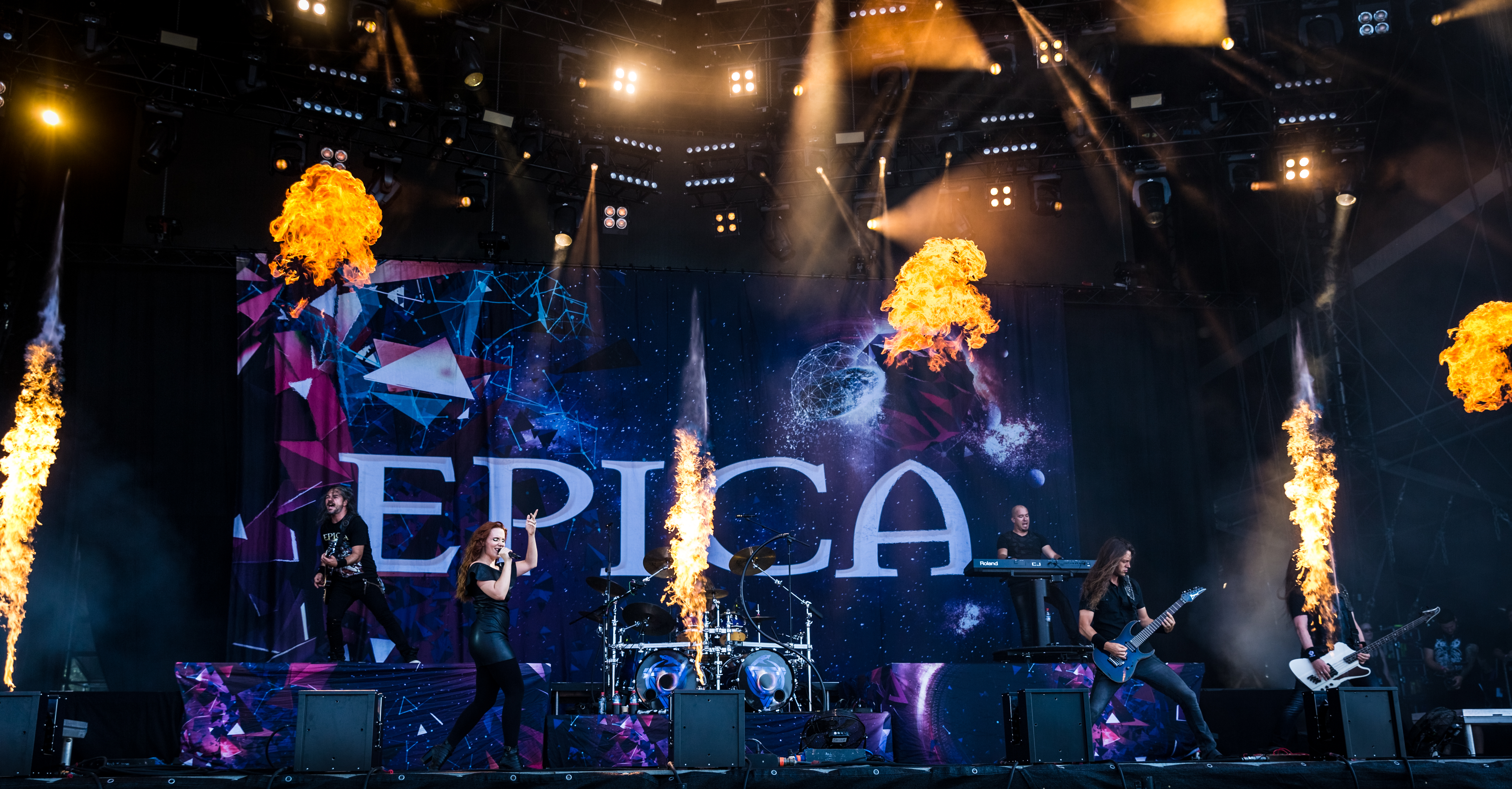
Epica live at Wacken Open Air 2018

On 31 May 2016, Epica confirmed the title of the band's new album: The Holographic Principle, which was released on 30 September 2016. In an interview with Spark TV, the band's singer Simone Simons discussed the complex nature of the album, explaining that the band used more "real, live instruments" than in previous albums and that this album is "one of [the band's] most ambitious offerings to date". The band had previously announced that the album would be released as part of their performance at the second edition of Epic Metal Fest, but later revised this, stating it would be released a day earlier.

On 1 September 2017, the band released their first EP, The Solace System, during the second North American leg of the tour. The EP features 6 songs that were planned and recorded but never included in The Holographic Principle.

Epica released an EP on 20 December 2017, in Japan titled Epica vs Attack on Titan Songs, featuring covers of songs from the anime Attack on Titan. The EP was released worldwide on 20 July 2018.

On 3 July 2019, Epica announced that they would release their first book later that year. This would include a history of the band, interviews, and photos.

The band announced on July 17, 2019, that a Gold Edition of their album Design Your Universe would be released on October 4, 2019, in support of its tenth anniversary, along with a tour.

=== Omega, The Alchemy Project and Aspiral (2020–present) ===
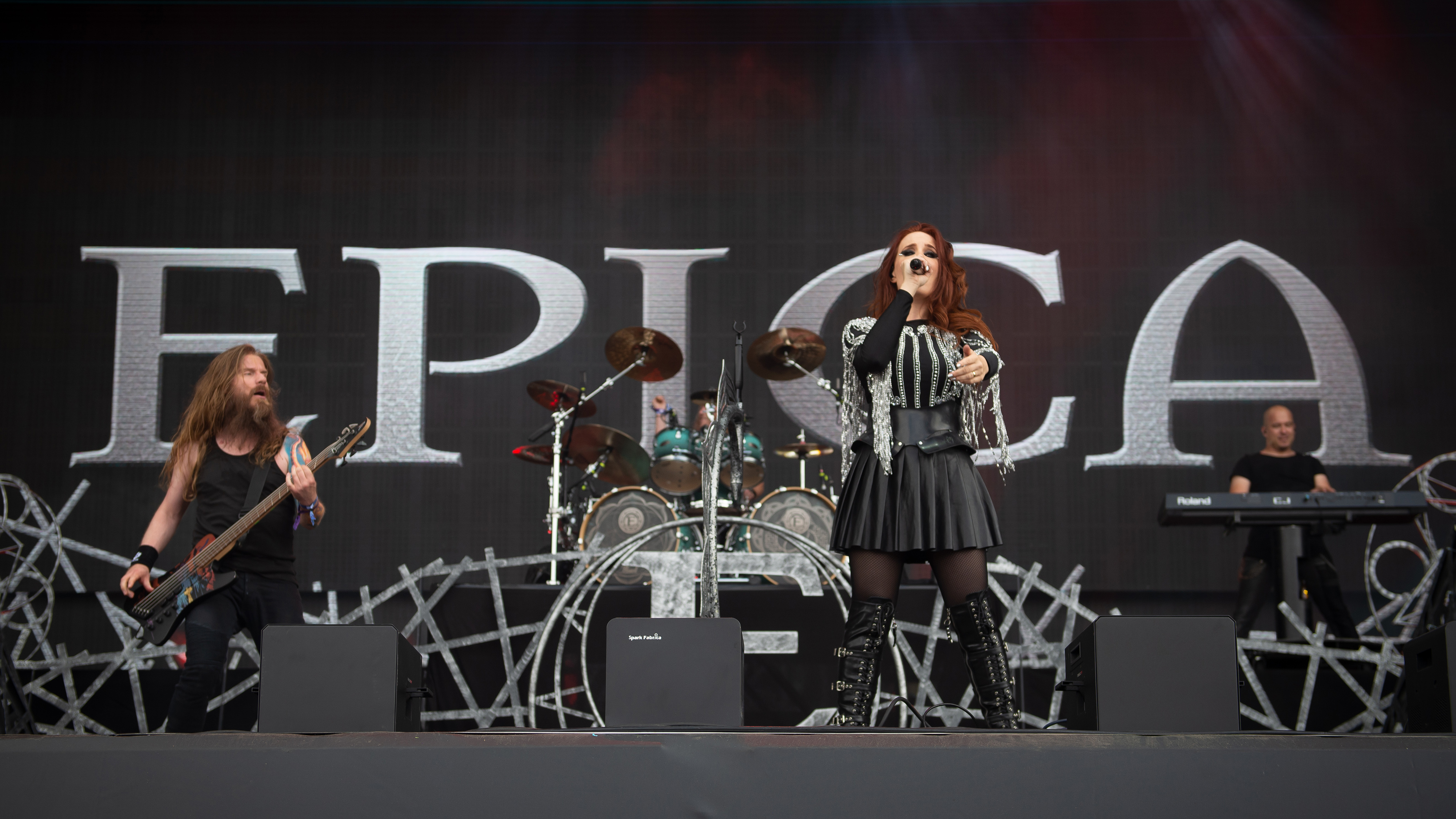
Epica performing at Hellfest in 2022

Simone Simons stated on February 1, 2020, that pre-production for the next album had been completed. On March 11, 2020, the band entered the studio to begin recording their new album and, in turn, released studio vlogs showing the album-making process for their upcoming eighth studio album. Mark Jansen said in an interview that the album's release date could be delayed due to the COVID-19 pandemic. It was reported on April 17, 2020, that Simone Simons had finished recording vocals for the new album. Mark Jansen later confirmed on September 2, 2020, that the album had been recorded, mixed, and mastered, with orchestrations and choir completed before the band began recording.

Nuclear Blast later announced on October 7, 2020, the title of the band's eighth studio album, Omega, along with a release date of February 26, 2021. On October 9, 2020, the first single from the album, "Abyss of Time – Countdown to Singularity," was released with an official music video. The second single from the album, "Freedom – The Wolves Within," was released on November 27, 2020, along with a music video. The third single, "Rivers," was released on January 22, 2021, along with a visualizer video. In support of the album, the band performed a livestream event titled Omega Alive, which took place on June 12, 2021. It was released on several audio and video formats on December 3, 2021.

On September 16, 2022, the band announced their third EP, The Alchemy Project, a collaborative effort with each song featuring at least one guest artist. It was released on November 11, 2022, via Atomic Fire. It was accompanied by official music videos for the songs "The Final Lullaby" and "Sirens – Of Blood and Water". In May 2023, Epica was chosen to open for Metallica with Ice Nine Kills for a short run of shows in Paris and Hamburg on their M72 World Tour, replacing Five Finger Death Punch, who had canceled their appearances due to health issues. On November 7, 2023, the band announced The Symphonic Synergy, a set of four special shows with an orchestra and a choir, set to take place in both Amsterdam on September 19 and 20, 2024, and Mexico City on December 6 and 7, 2024.

Simons stated in an interview in March 2024 that the ninth studio album was in production and estimated that the album would be released in 2025. The album Aspiral was announced on January 30, 2025, coinciding with the release of the new single "Cross the Divide" and following the release of the single "Arcana". The album resumed the "A New Age Dawns" series that was started on Consign to Oblivion and continued on Design Your Universe.

== Musical style ==
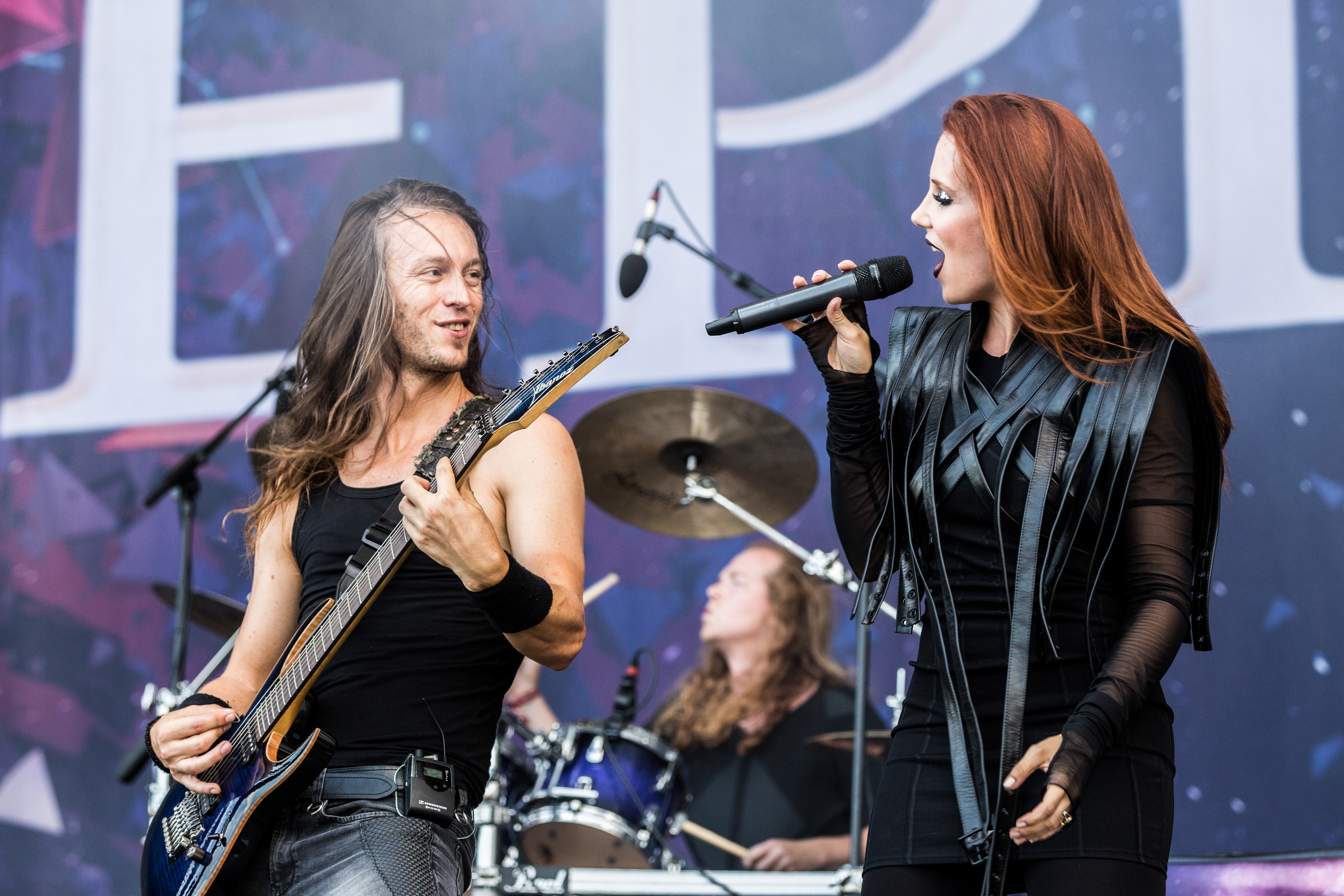
The contrast between Simone Simons' operatic vocals and Mark Jansen's death growls is a feature of Epica's music.

Epica performs a blend of symphonic metal, gothic metal, progressive metal, death metal and, more rarely, thrash metal, power metal and folk metal.

Their former guitarist Ad Sluijter described the band as "a bridge between power metal and gothic metal." Vocalist Simone Simons has expressed a preference for the group to be described as symphonic metal, although the band's founder, Mark Jansen, notes that they do not mind being called gothic metal. Jansen has also described the band as "symphonic death metal" and as a bridge between death metal and symphonic metal.

The music of Epica is described as "epic, grand, and majestic," with some of it being "more subdued and introspective." The band is also known for its progressive metal tendencies. Their music also features a gothic atmosphere and sentimentality.

Epica uses a "trademark of many symphonic and gothic metal bands" by contrasting "two extremes, death grunts and brutality on one side, airy female melodiousness on the other." Eduardo Rivadavia of AllMusic notes that the band's "attraction ultimately hinges on exploring the sonic contrasts of light and dark; the punishing intensity of those elephantine guitar riffs and hyperactive drumming cast against the soaring, layered sweetness of the orchestrated strings and keyboards." Simone Simons delivers classical (operatic) vocals in a mezzo-soprano range, but over time, she has also begun to sing in a more modern style with belted vocals (Rock/Pop, as she described it in an interview about the release of "Consign to Oblivion") and is sometimes known to sing "with a clear alto voice that has a flawless tone and a lot of emotion." However, Simone later admitted that she was mistaken and that she is not a mezzo-soprano, but a soprano. Mark Jansen delivers death growls "that are secondary to Simons' singing, but very important in terms of balance and variety." The group is also known to employ human choirs and orchestras with additional embellishments such as spoken word recitals and lyrics in Latin and Arabic.

== Band members ==
Current

- Mark Jansen – rhythm guitar, unclean vocals (2002–present)
- Coen Janssen – keyboards, synthesizers, piano (2002–present)
- Simone Simons – lead vocals (2002–present)
- Ariën van Weesenbeek – drums (2007–present; session member: 2006–2007)
- Isaac Delahaye – lead guitar, backing vocals (2009–present)
- Rob van der Loo – bass (2012–present)

Former

- Helena Iren Michaelsen – lead vocals (2002)
- Jeroen Simons – drums (2002–2006; guested in 2013)
- Ad Sluijter – lead guitar (2002–2008; guested in 2013)
- Yves Huts – bass (2002–2012; guested in 2013, 2022)

== Discography ==
- The Phantom Agony (2003)
- Consign to Oblivion (2005)
- The Divine Conspiracy (2007)
- Design Your Universe (2009)
- Requiem for the Indifferent (2012)
- The Quantum Enigma (2014)
- The Holographic Principle (2016)
- Omega (2021)
- Aspiral (2025)
