= The Classical Conspiracy =

2009 live album by Epica

Live album by Epica
- Released: 8 May 2009
- Recorded: 14 June 2008
- Venue: Miskolc Opera Festival, Miskolc, Hungary
- Genre: Symphonic metal, neoclassical metal
- Length: 143:56
- Label: Nuclear Blast
- Producer: Epica, Sascha Paeth

Epica chronology
The Divine Conspiracy (2007)	The Classical Conspiracy (2009)	Design Your Universe (2009)

Professional ratings
Review scores
Source	Rating
AllMusic	4/5 stars
About.com	4/5 stars
Live-Metal.net	9/10 stars
Lords Of Metal	9.5/10 stars
Metal Asylum	7.5/10 stars
Rock Sound	6/10 stars

The Classical Conspiracy is the second live album by Dutch symphonic metal band Epica. The recorded live show took part in Miskolc, Hungary on 14 June 2008 in the framework of the Miskolc Opera Festival, where the Swedish symphonic metal band Therion had done a similar show a year before. Epica performed on stage with a 40-piece orchestra and a 30-piece choir, entirely composed of Hungarian musicians conducted by Zsolt Regos. The expanded ensemble played classical music, excerpts from operas and movie soundtracks, as well as Epica's songs. The album was released on 8 May 2009 through Nuclear Blast Records.

This is the first album featuring Ariën van Weesenbeek as the new official drummer of Epica and also the last album with founding member and lead guitarist Ad Sluijter, who had already left the band when the album was released.

== Track listing ==
CD 1 - Classical set
No.	Title	Writer(s)	Length
1.	"Palladium"	Yves Huts	3:46
2.	"Dies Irae" (from "Requiem")	Giuseppe Verdi	2:15
3.	"Ombra mai fu" (from "Xerxes")	George Frideric Handel	3:06
4.	"Adagio" (from "New World Symphony")	Antonín Dvořák	9:02
5.	"Spiderman Medley"	Danny Elfman	4:16
6.	"Presto" (from "The Four Seasons")	Antonio Vivaldi	3:06
7.	"Montagues & Capulets" (from "Romeo and Juliet")	Sergei Prokofiev	2:11
8.	"The Imperial March" (from "The Empire Strikes Back")	John Williams	3:25
9.	"Stabat Mater Dolorosa" (from "Stabat Mater")	Giovanni Battista Pergolesi	4:31
10.	"Unholy Trinity"	Huts	3:11
11.	"In the Hall of the Mountain King" (from Peer Gynt)	Edvard Grieg	3:11
12.	"Pirates of the Caribbean" (European release only)	Hans Zimmer, Klaus Badelt	6:44
13.	"Indigo" (Prologue)	Mark Jansen, Coen Janssen	2:04
14.	"The Last Crusade" (A New Age Dawns, Part I)	Jansen, Huts, Ad Sluijter	4:18
15.	"Sensorium"	Jansen, Sluijter, Janssen, Simone Simons	5:06
16.	"Quietus" (Silent Reverie)	Epica	4:22
17.	"Chasing the Dragon"	Jansen, Huts, Janssen, Simons	8:03
18.	"Feint"	Jansen, Sluijter, Janssen, Simons	4:34

CD 2 - Epica set
No.	Title	Writer(s)	Length
1.	"Never Enough"	Huts	5:37
2.	"Beyond Belief"	Jansen, Sluijter, Simons	5:28
3.	"Cry for the Moon" (The Embrace that Smothers, Part IV)	Jansen, Sluijter, Simons	7:44
4.	"Safeguard to Paradise"	Huts, Jansen, Janssen	3:59
5.	"Blank Infinity"	Jansen, Janssen, Simons	4:45
6.	"Living a Lie" (The Embrace that Smothers, Part VIII - Simone Version)	Jansen, Huts, Sluijter, Simons	5:24
7.	"The Phantom Agony"	Jansen, Huts, Sluijter	10:30
8.	"Sancta Terra"	Jansen, Sluijter, Simons	5:11
9.	"Illusive Consensus"	Jansen, Sluijter, Janssen, Simons	5:45
10.	"Consign to Oblivion" (A New Age Dawns, Part III)	Jansen, Sluijter	12:06

== Personnel ==
Epica

- Simone Simons – lead vocals
- Mark Jansen – lead & rhythm guitar, grunts, screams, band arrangements on tracks 2, 6
- Ad Sluijter – lead & rhythm guitar, editing
- Yves Huts – bass, band arrangements on tracks 5, 7, 8, 11, 12
- Coen Janssen – synthesizer, piano, orchestral and choir arrangements, band arrangements on tracks 2, 4, 7
- Ariën van Weesenbeek – drums

Additional musicians

- Amanda Somerville – choir vocals
- Agnes Liptak – choir vocals

Choir of Miskolc National Theatre

- Boglarka Jambrik, Edina Kecskemeti, Eszter Maria Papp, Eva Orth, Eva Vajda, Ildiko Simon, Zsuzsa Adamy, Zsuzsa Kurucz, Agnes Liptak, Anette Cseh, Angelika Hircsu, Diana Kuttor, Linda Dolhai, Maria Takacs, Mariann Majlath, Oksana Pascsenko, Andras Marton, Erik Molnar, Gergely Boncser, Gergely Irlanda, Laszlo Bodor, Nandor Nandor, Tibor Osvath, Akos Baksy, Balazs Kolozsi, David Dani, Ivan Nagy, Robert Molnar, Sandor Demeter

Extended Reményi Ede Chamber Orchestra

- Beata Lukacs – violin
- Benjamin Almassy – violin
- Boglarka Balog – violin
- Doris Tatai – violin
- Eva Siklosi – violin
- Maria Lazanyi – violin
- Monika Zsekov – violin
- Zoltán Ficsor – violin
- Zoltan Kerenyi – violin
- Zsofia Nagy – violin
- Tamas Kriston – violin
- Janos Feher – viola
- Jozsef Kautzky – viola
- Sandor Szabo – viola
- Tamás Tóth – viola
- Angelika Béres – celli
- Annamaria Bodi – celli
- Kamilla Matakovics – celli
- Arpad Balog – double bass
- Gizella Keresztfalvi – double bass
- Sandor Czimer – clarinet
- Tamas Fogarasi – clarinet
- Csaba Szilagyi – trombone
- Istvan Molnar – trombone
- Zoltan Kakuk – trombone
- Gyorgy Aranyosi – trumpet
- Peter Gál – trumpet
- Beata Tatar – oboe
- Janos Implom – oboe
- János Dobos – tuba
- Tamas Domotor – timpani
- István Halász – bassoon
- Krisztián Járdány – bassoon
- Eniko Frencz – French horn
- Ferenc Tornyai – French horn
- Gergely Opauszky – French horn
- Sándor Horváth – French horn
- Marianna Moori – flute
- Tamas Siklosi – flute
- Mark Virágh – percussion
- Andras Bujtas – keyboards

Production

- Oliver Palotai – orchestral arrangements
- Sascha Paeth – mixing, mastering
- Zsolt Regos – choirmaster
- Tamias Kriston – concertmaster
- Hídvégi Dániel – live sound engineering
- Gresiczki Tamás – live sound engineering
- Olaf Reitmeier – editing
- Miro – editing
- Ad Sluijter – editing
- Simon Oberender – editing, mixing, mastering
- Stefan Heilemann – art direction, design
- Levente Kovács – photography
- Maria Schvab – photography
- Patrakov Alexey – photography
- Oleg Patrakov – photography
- Rita Miklán – photography
- Janos Adam – photography
- László Mocsári – photography
- Jan-Willem Stekelenburg - Epica FOH

== Charts ==
Chart	Peak position
Dutch Album Charts	23
Belgian Albums Chart (Flanders)	82
Belgian Albums Chart (Wallonia)	58
Switzerland Album Charts	81
France Album Charts	23
German Album Charts	87
