= The Divine Conspiracy =

2007 studio album by Epica

Studio album by Epica
- Released: 22 August 2007
- Recorded: November 2006 – February 2007
- Studio: Gate Studio, Wolfsburg, Germany
- Genre: Symphonic metal
- Length: 75:36
- Label: Nuclear Blast
- Producer: Sascha Paeth & Epica

Epica chronology
The Road to Paradiso (2006)	The Divine Conspiracy (2007)	The Classical Conspiracy (2009)

Singles from The Divine Conspiracy
- 1. "Never Enough" Released: 10 August 2007; 2. "Chasing the Dragon" Released: 27 June 2008

Professional ratings
Review scores
Source	Rating
AllMusic	3.5/5 stars
About.com	4/5 stars

The Divine Conspiracy is the third studio album by Dutch symphonic metal band Epica as well as their first concept album. It was released through Nuclear Blast in Japan on 22 August 2007, in the US on 28 August, in Europe on 7 September, and in the UK on 10 September. The concept that guides the songs is that God created many different religions for humanity to figure out and overcome them so as to discover that, in nature and essence, they were all in fact the same one (hence the name, "The Divine Conspiracy"). Aside from the concept of such a conspiracy, The Divine Conspiracy finalizes The Embrace That Smothers, which began in After Forever's Prison of Desire (Prologue and parts I-III) and continued in Epica's The Phantom Agony (parts IV-VI). In short, The Embrace That Smothers is a collection of 10 songs (Prologue and parts I-IX), which talks about the dangers of organized religion.

== Background ==
In The Divine Conspiracy, Mark Jansen gives some room for new themes in the lyrics, moving away from The Embrace That Smothers. For example, "Beyond Belief" centers around the dispute between science and religion, but at the same time it does not attack either side. The following track, "Safeguard to Paradise" deals with the methods of convincing suicide bombers, a sharp contrast to the slow and soft music. During an interview, vocalist Simone Simons commented that many of the major themes inspirations came from what she saw on the news, with predominance of the religious parts as on The Embrace That Smothers songs. Among other themes are the formation of a human being and sentiments towards others, as vanity on "Menace of Vanity" and obsession on "The Obsessive Devotion". "La‘fetach Chatat Rovetz" ("לפתח חטאת רובץ") is an expression in Hebrew. It means that sin lurks and awaits for a chance to strike and affect. About the religions influenced parts, Simons commented:

"You can believe whatever you want to if it gives you strength, but you should not oblige others to believe the same thing and all the suicides commands, the honor killings, all that stuff, it gives me goose bumps even right now."

Later on, she exemplifies with the songs "Living a Lie" and "Death of a Dream":

"I wrote about a Christian couple who were pregnant, who had a baby which died at birth. That's "Living a Lie". "Death of a Dream" is about the position of women in the Islam society, that they are not equal to men. That they are speaking out for themselves. The main character in that song is a young girl, a Muslim who got pregnant by her boyfriend who is not a Muslim and her father killed her. That's how the song title came about, "Death of a Dream"."

The album cover also comes from the depicted concept. On an interview for Sonic Cathedral, Simons commented that it was her idea, as she had no problems in being naked for an artistic purpose. The nudity in the cover manages to illustrate the state of innocence people have before making wrong choices and, as life goes through, marks starts to appear and take hold, as depicted by the marks on her body. Then, Eve's apple illustrates the religious side of the album, where she decides to bite it and become a human being in all its circumstances.

Following the departure of drummer Jeroen Simons in 2006, the album features a session appearance by God Dethroned drummer Ariën van Weesenbeek, who later became a full-time member of the band. The album also features a guest performance of After Forever's guitarist and singer Sander Gommans, who contributed grunt vocals for the song "Death of a Dream." The European digipak version of the album contains a cover of Fear Factory's "Replica".

The album was the first to reach the Top 10 Dutch charts, reaching the No.9.

== Track listing ==
No.	Title	Lyrics	Music	Length
1.	"Indigo (Prologue)"	Mark Jansen	Coen Janssen, Jansen	2:05
2.	"The Obsessive Devotion"	Jansen, Ad Sluijter	Jansen	7:13
3.	"Menace of Vanity"	Jansen	Jansen	4:13
4.	"Chasing the Dragon"	Simone Simons, Jansen	Jansen, Sluijter, Yves Huts, Simons	7:40
5.	"Never Enough"	Simons, Sluijter	Huts	4:47
6.	"La‘petach Chatat Rovetz (The Last Embrace)" (instrumental)		Jansen, Huts	1:46
7.	"Death of a Dream" (The Embrace That Smothers, Part VII)	Simons, Sluijter	Jansen, Huts, Sluijter	6:03
8.	"Living a Lie" (The Embrace That Smothers, Part VIII)	Simons, Jansen	Jansen, Huts, Sluijter	4:56
9.	"Fools of Damnation" (The Embrace That Smothers, Part IX)	Jansen	Jansen, Sluijter, Simons	8:42
10.	"Beyond Belief"	Jansen, Sluijter	Jansen, Sluijter, Simons	5:25
11.	"Safeguard to Paradise"	Jansen	Huts, Jansen, Janssen	3:46
12.	"Sancta Terra"	Simons	Jansen, Sluijter, Simons	4:57
13.	"The Divine Conspiracy"	Jansen	Jansen, Sluijter, Janssen	13:56
Total length:				75:36

Bonus tracks
No.	Title	Lyrics	Music	Length
14.	"Higher High"	Simons	Huts, Jansen, Simons	5:27
15.	"Replica" (Fear Factory cover)	Burton C. Bell	Dino Cazares, Raymond Herrera	4:10
16.	"Safeguard to Paradise (Piano Version)"	Jansen	Huts, Jansen, Janssen	3:50
Total length:				89:03

=== Limited Edition bonus CD ===
- "Higher High" - 5:26
- "Replica" - 4:08 (Fear Factory cover)
- "Never Enough" (Video)
- "Never Enough" (Long Version - Video)
- Making of Never Enough (Video)

== Personnel ==
Credits for The Divine Conspiracy adapted from liner notes.

Epica

- Simone Simons – lead vocals
- Mark Jansen – rhythm guitar, grunts
- Ad Sluijter – lead guitar
- Yves Huts – bass
- Coen Janssen – synths, piano, baritone vocals on "Beyond Belief"

Additional personnel

- Ariën van Weesenbeek – drums
- Sander Gommans – death grunts on "Death of a Dream"
- Olaf Reitmeier – acoustic guitar on "Chasing the Dragon", baritone vocals on "Beyond Belief", engineering, editor
- Amanda Somerville – spoken words in "The Obsessive Devotion", backing vocals, vocal lines arrangements and production, vocal coaching, engineering
- Gjalt Lucassen – priest in "Living a Lie"
- Jaff Wade – spoken words in "Fools of Damnation"

Epica Choir

- Amanda Somerville, Bridget Foggle, Cinzia Rizzo, Linda Janssen-van Summeren, Melvin Edmondsen, Previn Moore

Production

- Sascha Paeth – production, engineering, mixing, mastering, vocal arrangements, backing vocals
- Ad Sluijter – engineering, editor
- Simon Oberender – engineering, editor
- Mark Jansen – orchestral arrangements
- Yves Huts – orchestral arrangements
- Miro Rodenberg – orchestral arrangements
- Coen Janssen – choir arrangements

== Charts ==
Chart (2007)	Peak position
Belgian Albums (Ultratop Flanders)	40
Belgian Albums (Ultratop Wallonia)	57
Dutch Albums (Album Top 100)	9
French Albums (SNEP)	35
German Albums (Offizielle Top 100)	41
Japanese Albums (Oricon)	148
Swiss Albums (Schweizer Hitparade)	29
UK Independent Albums (OCC)	20
UK Rock & Metal Albums (OCC)	19
