= Isaac Delahaye =

Belgian guitarist and composer

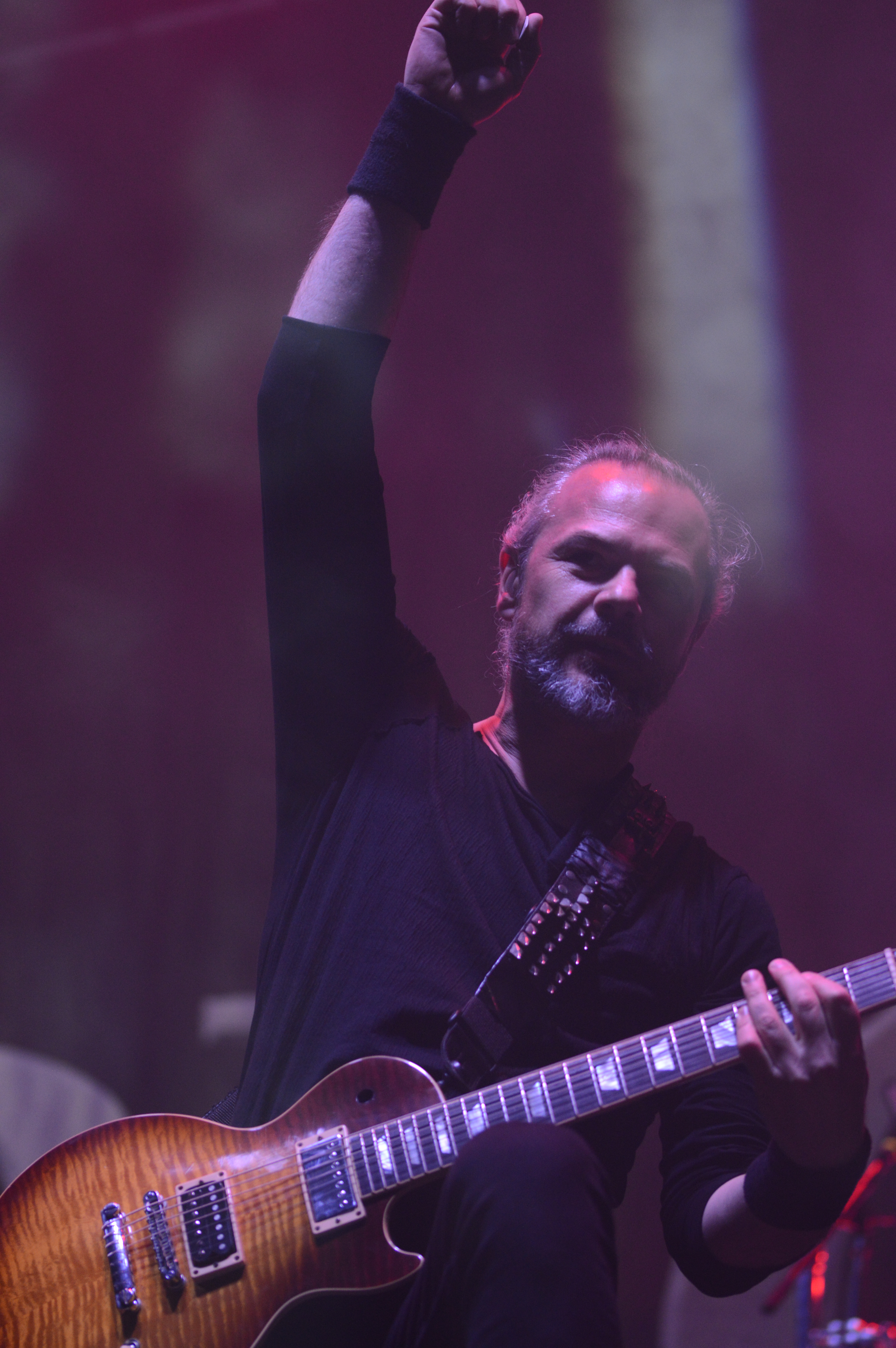
- Isaac Delahaye performing live in 2022

Background information
- Born: 9 January 1982 (age 44); Ypres, West Flanders, Belgium
- Origin: Belgium, Ypres
- Genres: Symphonic metal, melodic death metal, blackened death metal, progressive metal, thrash metal, heavy metal
- Occupations: Musician, songwriter
- Instruments: Guitar, bass, vocals

Isaac Delahaye (born 9 January 1982) is a Belgian guitarist and composer, best known as the lead guitarist of Dutch symphonic metal band Epica since 2009. Prior to that he was lead guitarist in the Dutch death metal band God Dethroned. Delahaye replaced former guitarist Jens van der Valk in God Dethroned after van der Valk left in 2004. He joined the band after a request from drummer and longtime friend Ariën van Weesenbeek and after several meetings with van Weesenbeek and Henri Sattler, Delahaye was welcomed into the band on 29 June 2004. On 15 January 2009, the official announcement came that Isaac was no longer a part of God Dethroned. Soon afterwards, an announcement came from the band Epica that proclaimed Delahaye as their recently hired guitarist.

Delahaye once used exclusively Jackson Guitars, his primary ones being a green Jackson Kelly and a black Jackson Kelly that have Seymour Duncan pickups with a Floyd Rose tremolo. More recently he has been using Ibanez Guitars, primarily his custom seven version of DN500K Darkstone, which he describes as an "Integral part of the sound of Epica". In an interview with Moshville Uk he states that he uses a Les Paul Black Beauty and en Epiphone custom for in the studio for solos, due to their thinner necks than the Darkstone. He also mentions that he uses a Maton 808 custom series TE acoustic. He uses Bogner amplifiers including the Uberschall and Shiva 25th Anniversary edition and in the studio mixes his guitar sound with an Axe FX II and SansAmp. He and also has used Bogner and V-Empire 2x12 Cabinets with V30 speakers.

Delahaye was a member of the symphonic death metal band MaYaN from 2010–2013. He appeared on the album Quarterpast. He was replaced by Merel Bechtold as rhythm guitarist.

== Musical style ==
Delahaye incorporates legato, alternate picking, tremolo picking, tapping, and use of the whammy bar in his solos.

== Education ==
Isaac has a Bachelor of Music degree.

== Extra gear ==
- Gibson Les Paul Standard 7 String Limited 2016 Heritage Cherry Sunburst
- Gibson Les Paul Standard 7 String Limited 2016 Tobacco Burst
- InTune Picks
- Morley + Boss Pedals
- Sennheiser Wireless + In Ear Monitoring
- American Music Products Straps
- Audio Technika Mics
- Ernie Ball Strings

Preceded by Jens Van Der Valk	Guitarist for God Dethroned; 2004–2009	Succeeded by Susan Gerl
Preceded by Ad Sluijter	Guitarist for Epica since 2009	Incumbent
