= List of songs with Latin lyrics =

This is a list of songs having lyrics in Latin.

This list contains songs performed in Latin by the listed performers. Songs that sample other recorded music in Latin do not become eligible only by virtue of that sampling. Songs with only a Latin refrain are also excluded.

== Classical music ==
Almost all Catholic liturgical music composed before the middle of the 20th century, including thousands of settings of the ordinary of the mass (Gloria, Credo, Sanctus, Agnus Dei), the ordinary and proper of the Requiem mass, psalms, canticles (such as the Magnificat), antiphons, and motets. Famous examples include:

- Johann Sebastian Bach – Mass in B Minor, four Missae, Magnificat, cantata BWV 191
- Wolfgang Amadeus Mozart – Ave Verum Corpus, Requiem
- Carl Orff – Carmina Burana, Meum est propositum in taberna mori
- Giovanni Pierluigi da Palestrina – Missa Papae Marcelli
- Antonio Vivaldi – Nulla in mundo pax sincera

The libretto for the opera-oratorio Oedipus rex by Igor Stravinsky is in Latin, as well as the 1963 choral composition Cantata misericordium by Benjamin Britten.

== Hymns and carols ==
- "Adeste Fideles"
- "Boar's Head Carol"
- "Gaudeamus Igitur", also known as De Brevitate Vitae
- "Gaudete"
- "Gloria Tibi Domine"
- "Io Vivat"
- "Tempus Adest Floridum"
- "Veni, Veni, Emmanuel"

== Light classical music ==
- Sarah Brightman – In Paradisum

== Popular music ==
=== Folk ===
- Die Irrlichter – Totus Floreo, Cantum Corvi, Angelus ad Virginem, Orientes Partibus, Puer Nobis Nascitur, Gaudete
- Garmarna – Euchari, O Viridissima Virga, O Frondens Virga
- Ougenweide – Totus Floreo, Terra Sinus Aperit, Gaudete
- Steeleye Span – Gaudete †

=== Metal ===
- After Forever – Mea Culpa, Leaden Legacy
- Avenged Sevenfold – Requiem
- Behemoth – Ora Pro Nobis Lucifer
- Ghost – Infestissumam
- In Extremo – Ave Maria
- Iced Earth – In Sacred Flames
- Helloween – Lavdate Dominvm
- Maudlin of the Well – The Ferryman
- Deathspell Omega – Obombration, First Prayer, Malign Paradigm
- Death SS – Black Mass
- Dimmu Borgir – Abrahadabra: The Invaluable Darkness (choir)
- Epica:
  - The Phantom Agony: Adyta (The Neverending Embrace – Prelude), Facade of Reality, Illusive Consensus, The Phantom Agony
  - Consign to Oblivion: Hunab K’u (A New Age Dawns), Dance of Fate, The Last Crusade (A New Age Dawns Part I), Consign to Oblivion (A New Age Dawns Part III)
  - The Divine Conspiracy: Indigo (Prologue), The Obsessive Devotion, Living a Lie (The Embrace that Smothers Part VIII), Fools of Damnation (The Embrace that Smothers Part IX), The Divine Conspiracy
  - Design Your Universe: Samadhi (Prelude), Resign to Surrender (A New Age Dawns Part IV), Martyr of the Free World, Kingdom of Heaven (A New Age Dawns Part V), Design Your Universe (A New Age Dawns Part IV)
  - Requiem for the Indifferent: Karma, Monopoly on Truth, Internal Warfare, Requiem for the Indifferent, Guilty Demeanor
  - The Quantum Enigma: Originem, The Second Stone, The Quantum Enigma (Kingdom Of Heaven Part II)
  - The Holographic Principle: Eidola, Tear Down Your Walls, The Holographic Principle - A Profound Understanding Of Reality
  - The Solace System: Architect of Light, Decoded Poetry
  - Omega: Alpha - Anteludium, The Skeleton Key, Gaia, Kingdom Of Heaven Part III - The Antediluvian Universe
  - Aspiral: Darkness Dies In Light - A New Age Dawns Part VII, Obsidian Heart, Metanoia - A New Age Dawns Part VIII
- Ex Deo:
  - Romulus: Cruor Nostri Abbas, Cry Havoc, In Her Dark Embrace, Invictus, Storm the Gates of Alesia
  - Caligvla: Once Were Romans, Per Oculos Aquila, Pollice Verso
- Fleshgod Apocalypse - The Deceit, The Egoism, Monnalisa
- Mayhem – De Mysteriis Dom Sathanas
- Nazgûl (Italian 'Symphonic' Black Metal band): All their discography is in Latin.
- Nightwish: Shoemaker
- Powerwolf: Raise Your Fist, Evangelist , Sactus Dominus, Fist by Fist (Sacralize or Strike), Killers with the cross, Stossgebet, Glaubenskraft, Sermon of Swords, Coleus Sanctus. Many of their other songs contain some lines in Latin, have a Latin name and/or are supported by a choir singing in Latin.
- Rhapsody of Fire – Ira Tenax, Reign Of Terror, Vis Divina, In Principio, Winter's Rain, Valley of Shadows
- Rotting Christ:
  - Sanctus Diavolos: Visions of a Blind Order, Sanctimonius, Sanctus Diavolos
  - Theogonia: Gaia Telus, Rege Diabolicus
  - Κατά τον δαίμονα εαυτού: Grandis spiritus diavolos
  - The Heretics: Dies Irae, Fire, God and Fear and The Voice of the Universe (passages only).
- Saltatio Mortis - Factus de materia, Totus Floreo
- Sabaton:
  - Coat of Arms (album): Wehrmacht
  - Carolus Rex (album): Lejonet från Norden
  - Heroes (Sabaton album): Resist and Bite
- Subway to Sally – Ad Mortem Festinamus
- Tristania:
  - Widow's Weeds: Preludium..., ...Postludium
  - Beyond the Veil: Angina
  - World of Glass: The Shining Path, Wormwood, Hatred Grows, Crushed Dreams (choir passages)
- Týr: Causa Latronum Normannorum
- Venom Inc.: Avé
- Xandria – A Prophecy of Worlds to Fall
- Zeal & Ardor - Coagula

=== Various ===
- Alice Cooper – My God
- Alizée- Veni Vedi Vici
- Abonos – Izlaz
- Abruptum – De Profundis Mors Vas Consumet
- Ace of Base – Happy Nation
- Angelo Branduardi – Ille mi par esse deo... Un dio mi pare
- Ataraxia – Maria Ceremoniale, Mundus Est Jocundum, Spiritus Ad Vindictam *
- Bára Basiková – Veni Domine † (Come lord)
- Bauhaus (band) – Stigmata Martyr
- Patrick Cassidy – Vide Cor Meum *
- Corvus Corax – Ante Casu Peccati (album, 1989), Inter Deum et Diabolum Semper Musica Est (album, 1993), Viator (album, 1998), Mille Anni Passi Sunt (album, 2000), Tritonus (album, 2004), Tempi Antiquii (album, 2004), Venus Vina Musica (album, 2006), Cantus Buranus II (album, 2008) *
- Coven – Satanic Mass
- The Cranberries – Electric Blue Eyes
- D.Gray-man – Lala's Lullaby
- Dargaard – Caverna Obscura, Ave Atque Vale, Thy Fleeing Time
- Dark Sanctuary – Miserere
- Die Irrlichter – Totus Floreo
- Dissidia 012 Final Fantasy – Canto Mortis – An Undocumented Battle, Cantata Mortis
- Elfen Lied – Lillium
- Dovetree – multiple song titles...
- E Nomine – Das Testament (album), Schwarze Sonne (album) *
- E Nomine – Das Testament (album), Himmel oder Holle (album) *
- Electric Prunes – Mass in F Minor (album)
- Enigma – Sadeness (Part I), Mea Culpa (Part II)
- Enya – Pax Deorum, Tempus Vernum, Afer Ventus, Cursum perficio *
- Era – The Mass
- Erasure – Gaudete (rejoice (imperative Plural Form))
- David Essex Oh What a Circus (Salve regina mater misericordiae)

“Hail (the) queen, mother of mercy”

- Estampie – Ave generosa, Stella splendens, O Fortuna *
- Eurielle – City of the Dead
- European anthem (unofficial)
- Fabrizio De André – Laudate hominem (glory (to the) man)
- Faith and the Muse – Cantus, Chorus of the Furies
- Finisterra – Totus Floreo
- Franco Battiato – Delenda Carthago (Carthage Destroyed)
- Fullmetal Alchemist: Brotherhood – Lapis Philosophorum
- Fullmetal Alchemist: Brotherhood – Trisha's Lullaby
- Globus – Preliator, Diem Ex Dei, In Memoriam
- Haggard – Pestilencia
- Nobuo Uematsu – Super Smash Bros. Brawl main theme
- Helium Vola – Omnis Mundi Creatura, Omnia Sol Temperat, Nummus, Veni Veni *
- Highland – Bella Stella
- H. P. Lovecraft – Gloria Patria
- I Am Ghost – The Denouement
- Industrial Monk – Magnificat *
- Roland Kadan - Cerebrum demitte, Domine!, Coronae me iam piget, De Panda et Catta et aliis animalibus, Domus est vacua, In tyrannos!, Manus levate!, Neptunus, Non possum te non adamare, Paris et Helena, Pygmalion, Quid somno dulcius?, Roma antiqua stat, Undam secundam
- Itou Kanako – Lamento
- Jacula – Praesentia Domini
- Yuki Kajiura – Salva Nos
- Konstrakta – In corpore sano
- Kronos – Magica Europa, Party's (Partius?) Deorum
- Lacrimas Profundere – Priamus
- Lesiem – Fortitudo, Caritas, Fundamentum, Justitia, Invidia, Una terra, Occultum, Vivere, Liberta, Mater Gloria, Veni Creator Spiritus, Lacrimosa, Floreat, In Taberna Mori, Ave Fortuna, Agnus Dei, Pater Patriae, Navigator, Africa, Roma, Britannia, Coloris, Aureus, Diva, Paradisus, Poeta, Humilitas, Temperantia, Fides, Patientia, Spes, Prudentia, Vanitas, Bonitas *
- Libera – Gaudete, Sacris Solemnis, Sempiterna, Sanctus, Ave Maria, Recordare, Locus Iste, Stabat, Luminosa, Agnus Dei, Sancta, Angelis, Lux Aeterna, Ave Verum
- Little Mix – Lightning
- Luciano Ligabue – Libera nos a malo
- Magic Kingdom – Metallic Tragedy
- Mama Ladilla – Cunnilingus post mortem Fortitudo '
- Mecano – No es Serio este Cementerio
- Mediæval Bæbes – Salva Nos, Gaudete, Ecce Mundi Gaudium, Miseria Nomine, Verbum Caro, Veni, Veni *
- Alan Menken – Hellfire
- The Misfits – Halloween II
- Mocedades - Pange linguam
- My Ruin – Momento Mori
- Kumiko Noma – Lilium (Elfen Lied)
- Rosenstolz – Amo Vitam
- Sinéad O'Connor – Regina caeli, O filii et filiae
- Origa – Inner Universe
- Qntal – Ad mortem festinamus, Flamma, Omnis mundi illuminate, Stella splendens
- Yoko Shimomura – Somnus
- Simon and Garfunkel – Benedictus
- Sopor Aeternus – Modela est
- Cat Stevens – O Caritas
- The Association – Requiem for the Masses
- The Streets – Memento Mori
- Tanzwut – Toccato, Caupona, Fatue
- Theatre of Tragedy – Venus
- This Ascension – Gloria in Excelsis
- Ticklish Brother – Ficos et Olivas
- Tura Satana (band) – Omnia Vinat Amor
- U2 – Gloria
- Nobuo Uematsu – Advent: One-Winged Angel, Divinity, Liberi Fatali, One-Winged Angel, Yakusoku no chi ~The Promised Land~
- Unto Ashes – Quid Vides, Estuans Interius *
- Rufus Wainwright – Agnus Dei
- SIE Sound Team – The First Hunter
- Eric Whitacre – Lux Aurumque
- Akiko Shikata – HOLLOW, Agnus Dei
- Haruka Shimotsuki – Key of Paradise
- Keiki Kobayashi – The Unsung War (Ace Combat 5: The Unsung War)
- Paul Mottram – Tempestus
- Jesper Kyd – Apocalypse
- Murray Gold – Vale Decem, Song of Freedom
- Jacek Kaczmarski – Lekcja historii klasycznej
- Warren Zevon - Life'll Kill Ya from album Life'll Kill Ya
- Over the Garden Wall (feat. Audio Clayton) – Potatus Et Molassus
- Alan Menken, Chorus Of The Hunchback Of Notre Dame - Sanctuary!
- Alan Menken, Stephen Schwartz, The Hunchback of Notre Dame Choir - Entr'acte
- In the Green Original Company - O Virga ac Diadema
- In the Green Original Company - O Viridissima Virga
- Ola Gjeilo - Unicornis Captivatur
- Will Wood - Memento Mori: the most important thing in the world

=== Notes ===
- * These artists have recorded a significant body of work in Latin. Titles given are representative or well known.
- † This symbol indicates a hit single.

== Other music ==
- The early music ensemble Rondellus has performed acoustic renditions of Black Sabbath songs in Latin.
- Dr. Jukka Ammondt has performed a number of songs by Elvis Presley translated into Latin.
