= Catullus 101 =

Classical elegy paying tribute to poet's dead brother

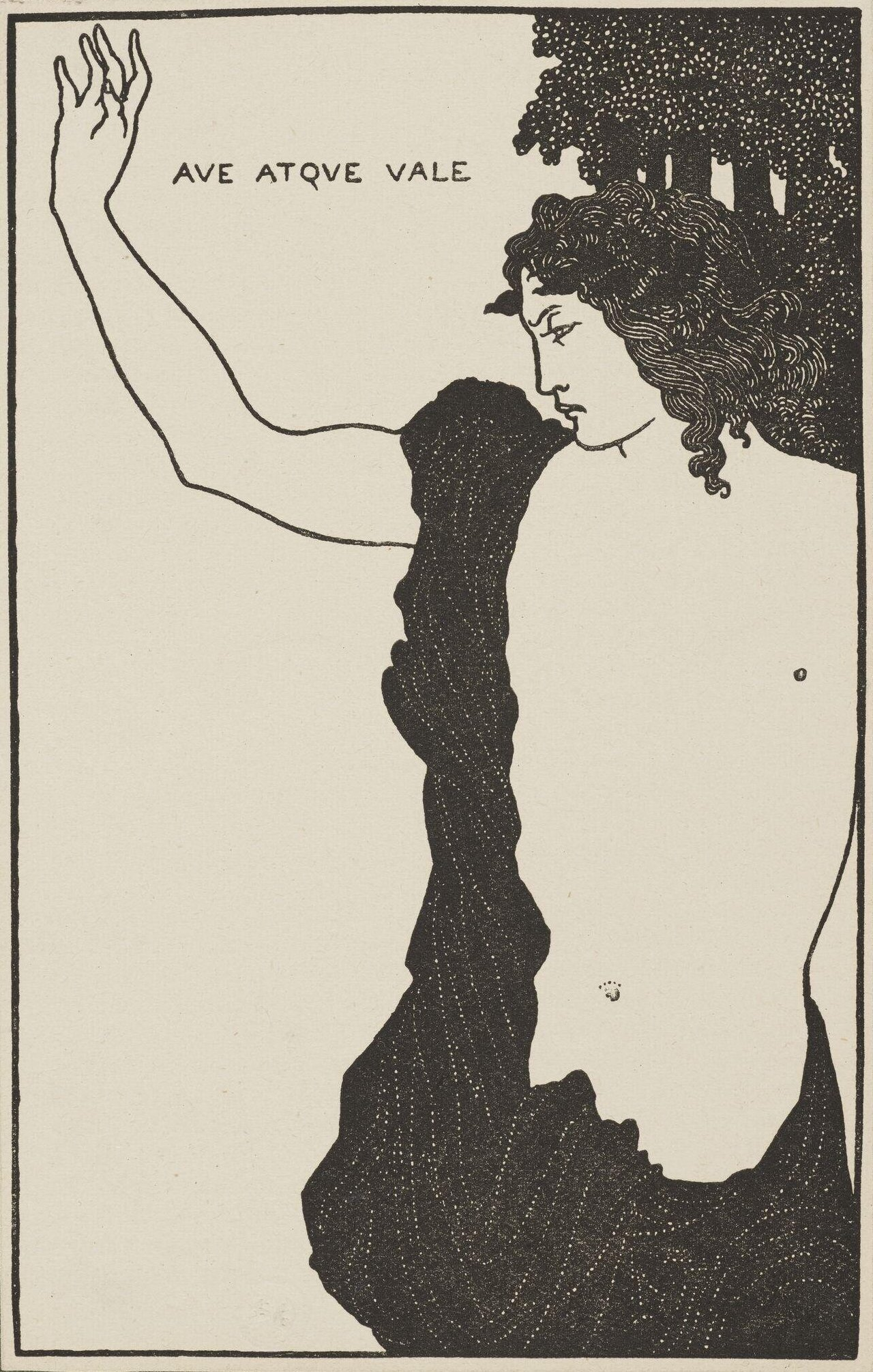
Print by Aubrey Beardsley

Catullus 101 in Latin with meter and notes

Catullus 101 is an elegiac poem written by the Roman poet Gaius Valerius Catullus. It is addressed to Catullus' dead brother or, strictly speaking, to the "mute ashes" which are the only remaining evidence of his brother's body.

== Context ==
The tone is grief-stricken and tender, with Catullus trying to give the best gift he had to bestow (a poem) on his brother, who was taken prematurely. The last words, "Hail and Farewell" (in Latin, ave atque vale), are among Catullus' most famous; an alternative modern translation might be "I salute you...and goodbye".

The meter is elegiac couplet, which was usually employed in love poetry, such as Catullus' addresses to Lesbia. However, the elegiac couplet was originally used by ancient Greek poets to express grief and lamentation, making it an entirely suitable form to express Catullus' mourning.

== Text ==
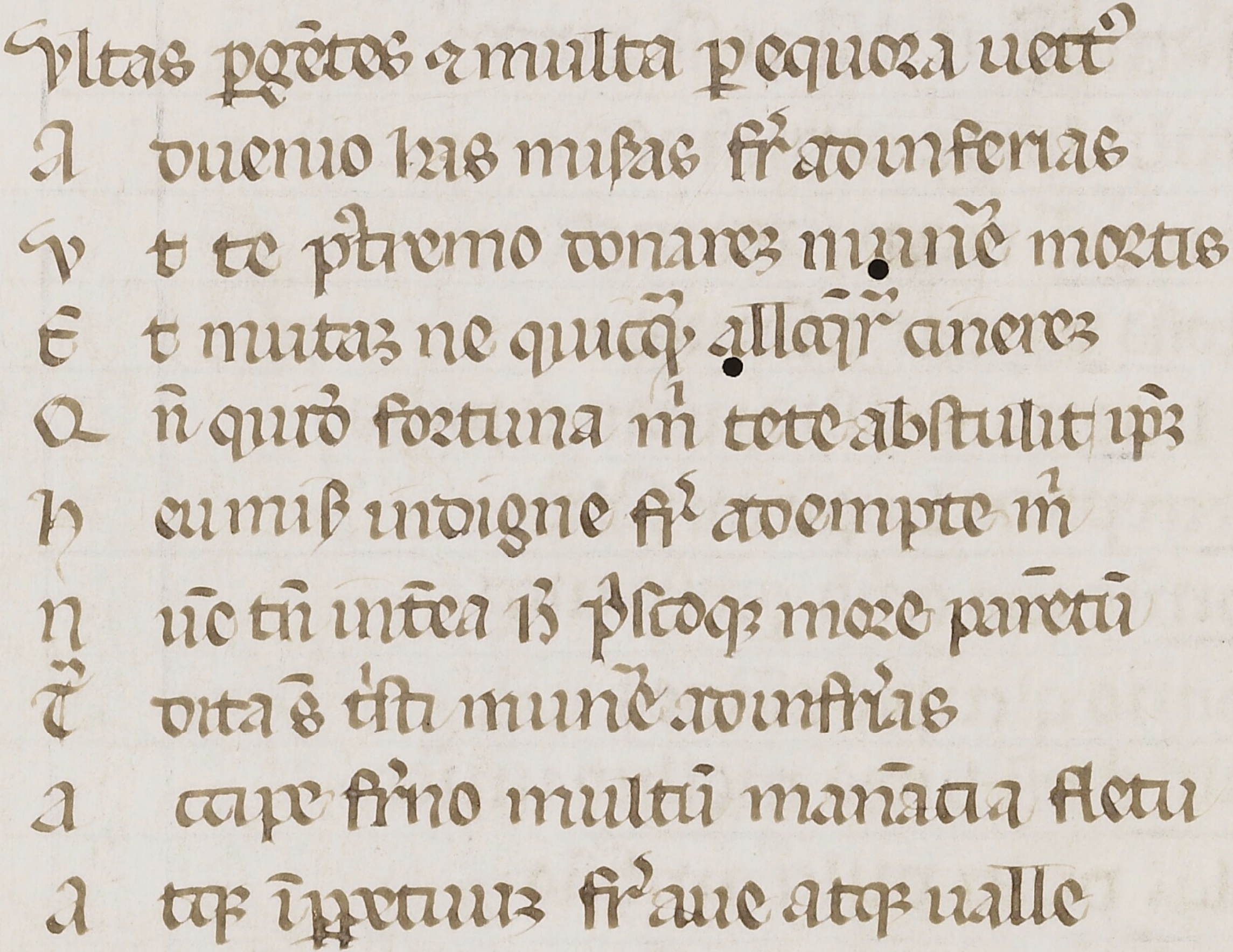
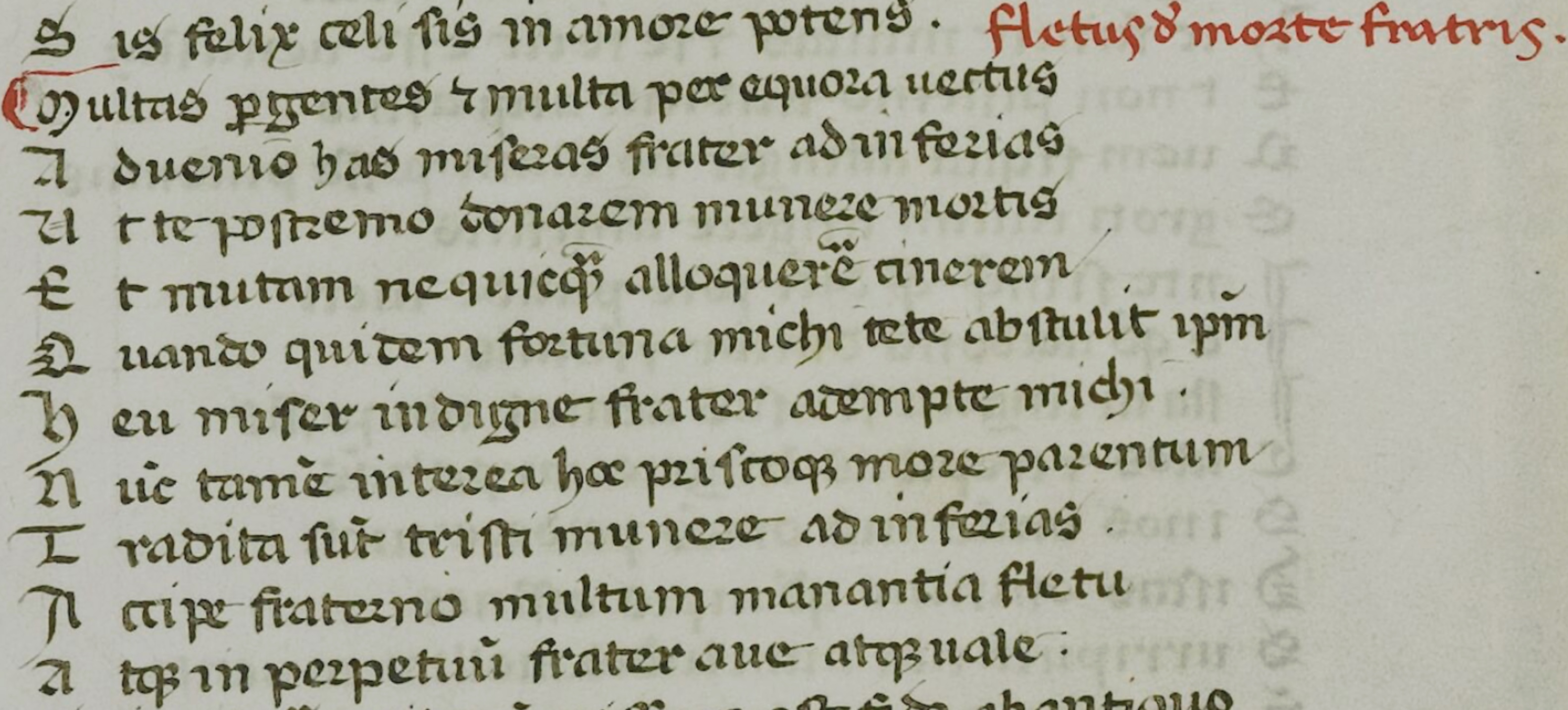

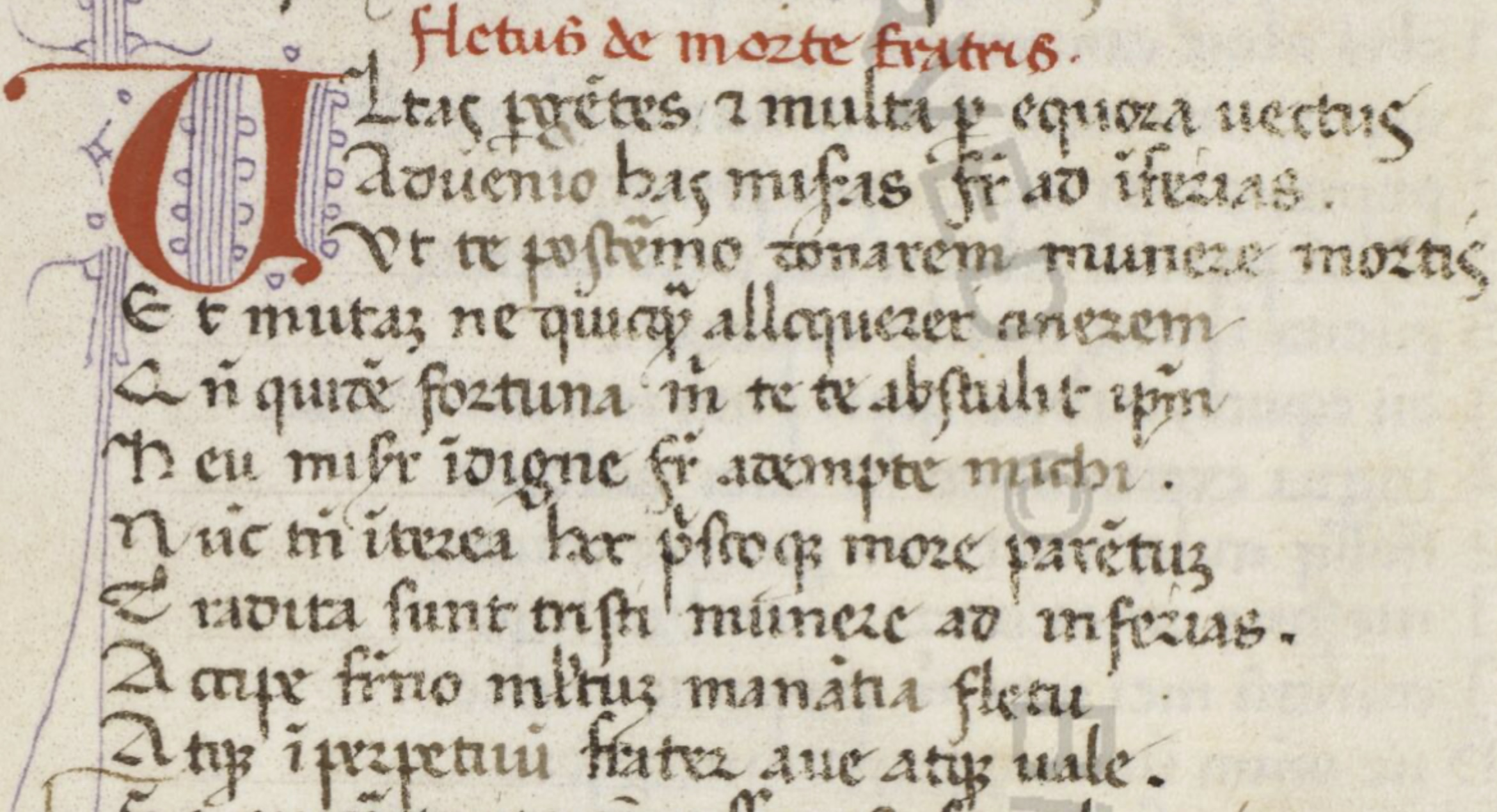
Manuscripts O, G, and R (C14)

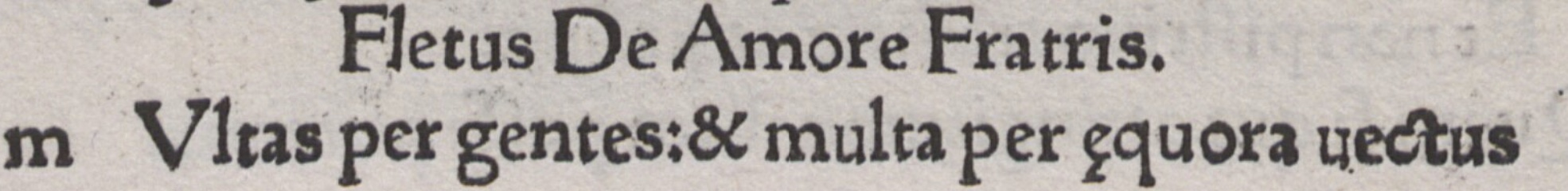

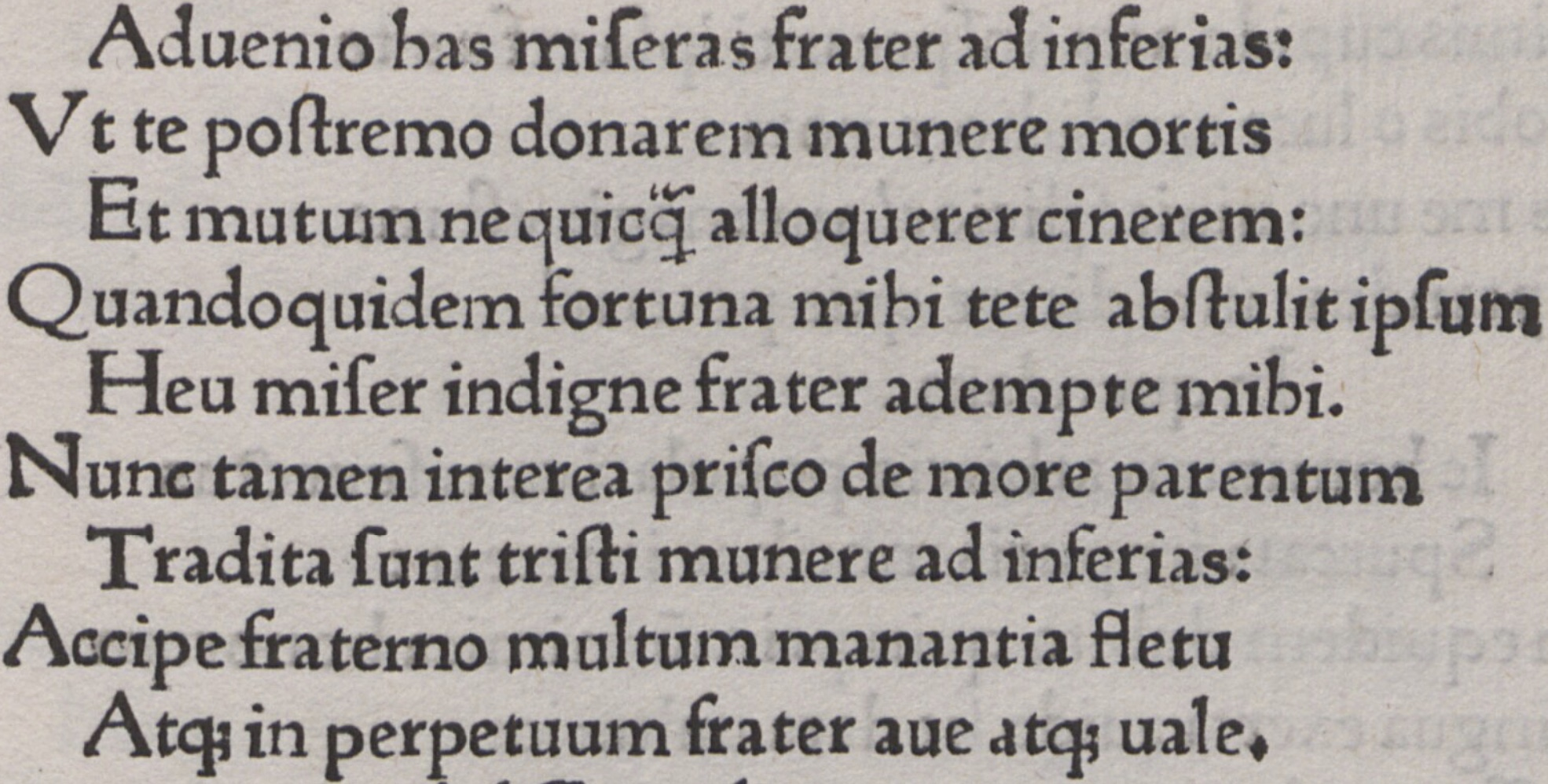
1472 editio princeps

Multās per gentēs et multa per aequora vectus
adveniō hās miserās, frāter, ad īnferiās,
ut tē postrēmō dōnārem mūnere mortis
et mūtam nēquīquam alloquerer cinerem
quandoquidem fortūna mihī tētē abstulit ipsum
heu miser indignē frāter adēmpte mihī
nunc tamen intereā haec, prīscō quae mōre parentum
trādita sunt trīstī mūnere ad īnferiās,
accipe frāternō multum mānantia flētū.
Atque in perpetuum, frāter, avē atque valē.

Translation:

Having been carried through many nations and over many seas,
I arrive, brother, at these wretched funeral rites
so that I might present you with the last tribute of death
and speak in vain to silent ash,
since Fortune has taken you, yourself, away from me.^{1}
Alas, poor brother, unfairly taken away from me,
now in the meantime, nevertheless, these things which in the ancient custom of ancestors
are handed over as a sad tribute to the rites,
receive, dripping much with brotherly weeping.
And forever, brother, hail and farewell.

Oxford Latin Dictionary, (Oxford: Clarendon Press, 1982, reprinted 1985) p. 965, entry on ipse, meaning 5 ("the actual").

== Another elegy ==
This is one of three poems in which Catullus tries to cope with the loss of his brother. The other poems are Catullus 65 and 68B. The cause of his brother's death is unknown; he apparently died before 57 BC in Bithynia, a northwest region of modern-day Turkey, near the ancient city of Troy.

== Modern translations ==
The poem was adapted in 1803 by the Italian poet Ugo Foscolo as the sonnet "In morte del fratello Giovanni" ("Un dì, s'io non andrò sempre fuggendo/di gente in gente..."), which commemorates the death of the poet's brother, Giovanni Foscolo.

Aubrey Beardsley made a translation of the poem, with an accompanying drawing, which he published in volume 7 of the Savoy (November 1896).

It was also used as a shadowhunters farewell in The Shadowhunter Chronicles by Cassandra Clare.

It was also featured in Nox (2010), a book by Canadian poet and classicist Anne Carson that comes in an accordion format within a box. Nox concerns the death of Carson's own brother, to which the poem of Catullus offers a parallel. Carson provides the Latin text, word-by-word annotations, and "a close and almost awkward translation".

== Musical settings ==
This poem, as translated by Aubrey Beardsley, was set by the composer Ned Rorem under the title "Catullus: On the Burial of his Brother". The Austrian music group Dargaard have performed this poem in song on their album Rise and Fall, naming it "Ave Atque Vale". Composer Frank Brickle set it for voice and two guitars in tribute to his mentor, Milton Babbitt. The Norwegian band Tristania used "ut te postremo donarem mortis" in the choir of the song "Angina" from the album Beyond the Veil (1999); the band is famous for using the Latin choirs in their songs.

UK composer Bob Chilcott set the poem, interwoven with a rearrangement of Orlando Gibbons' The Silver Swan, for double choir in Silver swan, published in 2017.

== Notes ==
1. The intensive pronoun ipse (ipsum) in this context contrasts the ash to the actual person who existed.

== Bibliography ==
- Cederstrom, Eleanor (1981). "Catullus' Last Gift to his Brother (c. 101)". Classical World. 75 (2): 117–118. doi:10.2307/4349341. JSTOR 4349341.
- Bright, D. F. (1976). "Non Bona Dicta: Catullus' Poetry of Separation". Quaderni Urbinati di Cultura Classica. 21: 106–119.
- Howe, Nicholas Phillies (1974). "The 'Terce Muse' of Catullus 101". Classical Philology. 69 (4): 274–276. doi:10.1086/366109.
- Robinson, C. E. (1965). "Multas per gentes". Greece & Rome. 12: 62–63. doi:10.1017/S0017383500014819.
