= Die Irrlichter =

German band

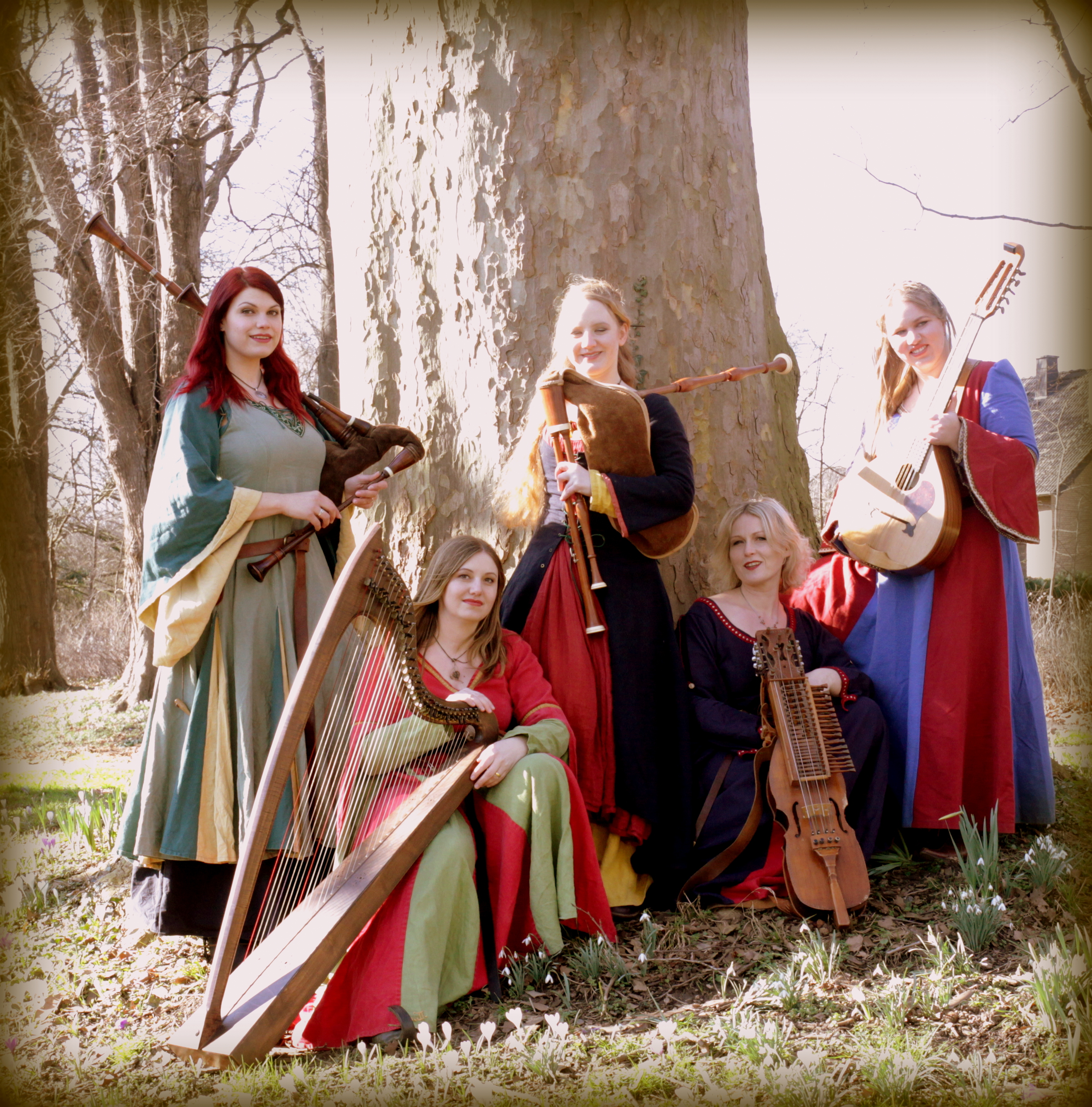
- 2016 lineup Standing (left to right): Annika Thoma, Daniela Heiderich, Anna Karin; sitting (left to right): Brigitta Jaroschek, Stephanie Keup

Background information
- Origin: Bonn, Germany
- Genres: Folk music; Medieval folk rock; Neo-medieval music
- Years active: 2001–present
- Labels: Emmuty Records, Totentanz (Soulfood)
- Members: Daniela Heiderich; Brigitta Jaroschek; Stephanie Keup; Annika Thoma
- Past members: Christoph Danielec, Ulrike Endesfelder, Anna Karin, Jutta Simon-Alt, Jutta Tiedge
- Website: www.die-irrlichter.de

Formed in 2001, Die Irrlichter ("Irrlicht" being a German expression for Will-o'-the-wisp) is a German band performing medieval folk and fantasy music at concerts, festivals, renaissance fairs, medieval banquets, and similar events in Germany and other European countries. They have been an all-female band since 2004.

== History ==
The band was originally formed as troubadours for a live action role-playing game, but quickly expanded beyond that niche. The young band played their first concert as a support band for Saltatio Mortis (then already a well-known up-and-coming act) in Cologne in early 2001. They found a producer in Roland Kempen of Die Streuner, with whom they would produce their first four albums over the next five years. During this time, several members dropped out to pursue or concentrate on academic or professional careers as the band gradually evolved from a mere hobby venture into an increasingly professional music project.

Between 2006 and 2008 the band was reorganized around longtime members Brigitta Jaroschek and Stephanie Keup. They started their own production firm which has been producing the group's albums ever since the fifth.

Typically a quintet, Die Irrlichter have performed with any number of musicians between two and six, and have increasingly been performing as a trio since 2013, with different lineups from a core group of regulars.

== Personnel ==
- Brigitta Jaroschek (née Karin) - Founding member, sings and plays various string instruments including harp, guitar, cister, bass lute, and mandolin. She is a M.A. graduate in Scandinavian Sciences and currently works as a researcher and old Norse teacher at the University of Bonn.
- Stephanie Keup - A core member who joined the band shortly after its inception, she sings and plays several instruments including most notably the nyckelharpa, recorders, and shawm. She originally came to the medieval scene not as a musician but as a participant in jousting tournaments, as she is a riding sports and vaulting trainer and paramedic.
- Daniela Heiderich - Became a full member in 2007 while she studied psychology at the University of Bonn. After graduation she decided to move to France to study traditional harp and bagpipes (Cornemuse du Centre) at the Conservatoire à rayonnement régional de Poitiers. After graduating there she now works as a professional musician and teacher, and is also an accomplished dancer.
- Annika Thoma - Initially a fan, then a guest (including contributions on cello to the 2015 album, Zaubergarten) and finally a full member after 2015. She sings and primarily plays shawm, recorders, and bagpipes. In her day job she is a trained nurse and nurse teacher.

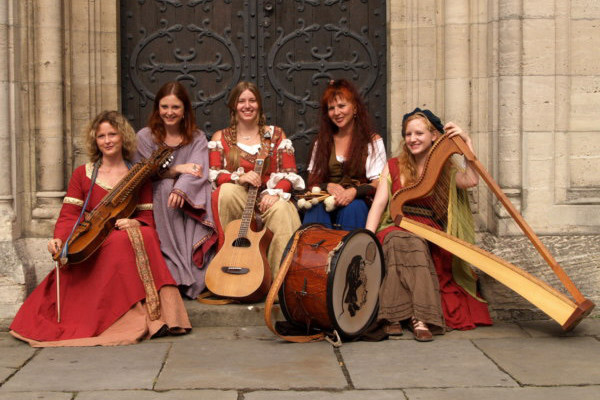
2009 in Braunschweig Left to right: Stephanie Keup-Büser, Jutta Simon-Alt, Brigitta Jaroschek, Jutta Tiedge, Daniela Heiderich

Many former band members still do perform with the band occasionally, including

- Anna Karin - Founding member, full member until 2007. Sings and plays various instruments including lute, guitar and percussion.
- Jutta Simon-Alt - A guest for some time, and a full member from 2007 to 2015. Sings and plays recorders, shawm, bagpipes, and oboe.
- Jutta Tiedge - Member from 2008 to 2013. Percussionist and belly dancer.

== Discography ==
- Koboldtanz, 2002 ("Kobold's Dance")
- Elfenhain, 2004 ("Elven Glade")
- Angelus ad Virginem, 2005 (medieval winter and Christmas tunes, named after the song Angelus ad virginem)
- Aventiure, 2006 (from medieval Âventiure, which roughly translates as Quest, adventure, or tale thereof)
- Goldstück, 2008 ("Gold Coin")
- Rauhnächte, 2010 (another concept album of winter and Christmas tunes, named for the magical Rauhnächte period between Christmas and the new year)
- Zaubergarten, 2015 ("Magic Garden")
