= Latin music (disambiguation) =

Latin music is a genre in the music industry. Conventionally, it encompasses all music with lyrics in Spanish or Portuguese, as well as various styles of music from Ibero-America.

Latin music may also refer to:

- Music of Latin America, often shortened as "Latin music"
- Songs with Latin lyrics:
  - Church music, compositions for churches written in Latin
  - Music of ancient Rome, the musical traditions of ancient Rome
