= Finsternis =

Finsternis (Darkness)

Studio album by E Nomine
- Released: 21 January 2002
- Genre: Electronic music Gregorian vocals
- Label: PolyGram

E Nomine chronology
Das Testament (1999)	Finsternis (Darkness) (2002)	Die Prophezeiung (2003)

Limited Edition
- Alternative cover

Finsternis (Darkness) is the second album of German musical project E Nomine, released in 2002. A limited-edition version of the album, which included a bonus DVD, was also released at the same time.

"Mitternacht", the album's debut single, once again featured the German synchronic speaker Christian Brückner, and helped make Finsternis into a top-ten hit in Germany in March 2002. The next single was the similarly popular "Das Tier in Mir (Wolfen)" followed by "Das Böse".

Finsternis also features the synchronis speakers for Robert De Niro, Gary Oldman, Samuel L. Jackson, Oliver Reed, Anthony Hopkins, Al Pacino, Michael Caine, John Malkovich, Nicolas Cage.

Angst is unique as it references Freddy Krueger from the A Nightmare on Elm Street series of slasher films.

== Track listing ==
1. Am Anfang war die Finsternis...! ("In the Beginning was the Darkness...!")
2. Mitternacht ("Midnight") (ger. synch. Robert De Niro)
3. Die Wandlung (Interlude) ("The Change" or "The Transubstantiation")
4. Wolfen (Das Tier in mir) ("Wolves (The Animal in me)") (ger. synch. Jack Nicholson)
5. Reise nach Transsilvanien (Interlude) ("Travel to Transylvania")
6. Dracul's Bluthochzeit ("Dracul's Blood-wedding") (ger. synch. Gary Oldman)
7. Die Offenbarung (Interlude) ("The Revelation")
8. Séance ("Séance") (ger. synch. Bruce Willis)
9. Die Bedrohung (Interlude) ("The Threat")
10. Das Böse ("The Evil") (ger. synch. Samuel L. Jackson)
11. Die Suche (Interlude) ("The Search")
12. Die Schwarzen Reiter ("The Black Riders") (ger. synch. Anthony Hopkins)
13. Die Verlautbarung (Interlude) ("The Announcement")
14. Zorn – Die 12 verbotenen Töne ("Wrath – The 12 forbidden Tones") (ger. synch. Oliver Reed)
15. Hexenein x Eins (Interlude) ("Witch's One-time-One")
16. Hexenjagd ("Witch-hunt") (ger. synch. Anthony Hopkins)
17. Das Unheil (Interlude) ("The Bale" or "The Disaster")
18. Der Exorzist ("The Exorcist") (ger. synch. Al Pacino)
19. Der Tod (Interlude) ("The Death")
20. Der Herr der Schatten ("The Lord of the Shadows") (ger. synch. Oliver Reed)
21. Der Ahnungsschauer (Interlude) ("The Shower of Premonitions")
22. Angst ("Angst" or "Fear") (ger. synch. Anthony Perkins, Michael Caine)
23. Der Schrei (Interlude) ("The Scream")
24. Exitus ("End" or "Death") (ger. synch. John Malkovich)
25. Das Schweigen (Interlude) ("The Silence")
26. Die Nachtwache ("Vigil" or "Nightwatch") (ger. synch. Anthony Perkins)
27. Die Stimme... (Interlude) ("The Voice...")
28. Aus dem Jenseits ("Out of the Beyond") (ger. synch. Nicolas Cage)
