= Vater Unser Part II (Psalm 23) =

Single by E Nomine

from the album Das Beste aus... Gottes Beitrag und Teufels Werk
- Released: December 6, 2004
- Genre: Electronic music Gregorian music
- Label: Polydor Records

E Nomine singles chronology
"Schwarze Sonne" (2003)	"Vater Unser Part II (Psalm 23)" (2004)	"Das Böse" (2005)

"Vater Unser, Part II (Psalm 23)" (ger. "Father of Ours, Part II (Psalm 23)") is the eighth single released by the German music project E Nomine, and appears on the 2004 album Das Beste aus... Gottes Beitrag und Teufels Werk. This tracks is a mix of 'Vater Unser' and 'Psalm 23' from "Das Testament" (1999).

== Track listing ==
1. Vater Unser, Part II (Psalm 23) - Radio Mix (3:54)
2. Vater Unser, Part II (Psalm 23) - Extended Mix (5:58)
3. Vater Unser - DJ Mellow- D. Remix (6:41)
4. Der Ring der Nibelungen (4:23)
5. Gebet: Psalm 23 (0:59)

== Chart performance ==
Chart (2004)	Peak position
Austria (Ö3 Austria Top 40)	42
Germany (GfK)	53
