= Veni vidi vici (disambiguation) =

Veni, vidi, vici is a Latin phrase popularly attributed to Julius Caesar.

Veni vidi vici may also refer to:

- Veni Vidi Vici (album), by The Forgotten, 1998
- Veni Vidi Vici (TV series), a Swedish comedy web series
- Veni Vidi Vici, a 2021 album by Tri.be
- "Veni Vidi Vici", a song by The Black Lips from Good Bad Not Evil
- "Veni-Vidi-Vici", a song by The Gaylords
- "Veni Vidi Vici", a song by Highland
- "Veni Vidi Vici", a song by Madonna from Rebel Heart
- ”Veni, Vidi, Vici”, a song by Virgin Steele from their 1998 album, Invictus
- "Veni Vidi Vici", a song by Glaive from his album Y'all

== See also ==
- Venni Vetti Vecci, a 1999 album by Ja Rule
- Vini vidivici, an extinct species of parrot
