= Schult =

Schult is a German surname. Notable people with the surname include:

- Art Schult (born June 20, 1928, in Brooklyn, New York, died July 25, 2014, in Ocala, Florida) is a former Major League Baseball player.
- Emil Schult (born 10 October 1946 in Dessau, Germany) is a German painter, poet and musician.
- HA Schult (born 24 June 1939 in Parchim, Mecklenburg) is a German installation, happening and conceptual artist.
- Jürgen Schult (born May 11, 1960, in Amt Neuhaus, Lower Saxony) is a German track and field athlete and the current world record holder.
- Rolf Schult (April 16, 1927 - March 13, 2013) is a German dubbing actor and real-life actor
- Almuth Schult, German goalkeeper

== See also ==
- Josef August Schultes (1773–1831), Austrian botanist whose standard scientific abbreviation is Schult.
- Julius Hermann Schultes (1804–1840), Austrian botanist whose standard scientific abbreviation is Schult.f.
