= The Dissolution of Eternity =

Studio album by Dargaard
- Released: 18 June 2001
- Recorded: 1999–2000
- Genre: Neoclassical dark wave, dark ambient
- Length: 52:32
- Language: English, Latin
- Label: Draenor
- Producer: Tharen

Dargaard chronology
In Nomine Aeternitatis (2000)	The Dissolution of Eternity (2001)	Rise and Fall (2004)

The Dissolution of Eternity is the third studio album by the Austrian neoclassical dark wave band Dargaard. It was recorded, mixed and mastered at Tonstudio Hoernix during 1999-2000. It was released in 2001.

== Track listing ==
No.	Title	Length
1.	"As Old as the Bones of the Earth"	07:13
2.	"Thy Fleeing Time"	04:49
3.	"A Path in the Dust"	05:09
4.	"In the Omnipresence of Death"	07:14
5.	"My Phantasm Supreme"	06:15
6.	"Night Before the Vastland Storms"	03:17
7.	"Fire's Dominion"	05:51
8.	"The Isolated Vale"	04:25
9.	"A Prophecy of Immortality"	05:36
10.	"Wanderer at the End of Time"	02:43
Total length:		52:32

== Personnel ==
- Tharen - all instruments, vocals
- Elisabeth Toriser - vocals
