= Die Prophezeiung =

Die Prophezeiung (The Prophecy)

Studio album by E Nomine
- Released: 14 April 2003
- Genre: Electronic music Gregorian vocals
- Label: Polydor Records

E Nomine chronology
Finsternis (2002)	Die Prophezeiung (The Prophecy) (2003)	Gottes Beitrag und Teufels Werk (2004)

Die Prophezeiung (The Prophecy) is the third album from the German music group E Nomine.

== Track listing ==
=== Normal CD ===
1. "Seit Anbeginn der Zeit...(Intro)" [Since the Beginning of Time]
2. "Die Verheissung (Interlude)" [The Prophecy]
3. "Deine Welt" [Your World]
4. "Schwarzer Traum (Interlude)" [Black Dream]
5. "Mondengel" [Angel of the Moon]
6. "Der Lockruf (Interlude)" [The Call]
7. "Das Omen (im Kreis des Bösen)" [The Omen (in the Circle of Evil)]
8. "Lauf der Zeit (Interlude)" [The Passage of Time]
9. "Das Rad des Schicksals" [The Wheels of Destiny]
10. "Das Orakel (Interlude)" [The Oracle]
11. "Der Blaubeermund" [The Blueberry-Mouth]
12. "Sternensturm (Interlude)" [Storm of Stars]
13. "Im Zeichen des Zodiak" [Under the Sign of Zodiak]
14. "Die Brücke ins Licht (Interlude)" [The Bridge Into Light]
15. "Laetitia" [Happiness]
16. "Das Rätsel (Interlude)" [The Riddle]
17. "Der Prophet" [The Prophet]
18. "Land der Hoffnung (Interlude)" [Land of Hope]
19. "Anderwelt (Laterna magica)" [Otherworld]
20. "In den Fängen von... (Interlude)" [In the Clutches Of...]
21. "Mysteria" [Mysteries]
22. "Friedhof der Engel (Interlude)" [Graveyard of Angels]
23. "Die Runen von Asgard" [The Runes of Asgard]
24. "Das Erwachen (Interlude)" [The Awakening]
25. "Schwarze Sonne" [Black Sun]
26. "Endzeit (Interlude)" [Endtimes]
27. "Jetzt ist es still" [Everything Is Silent Now]

=== Klassik Edition ===
Released on 14 April 2003 from Universal Music Group.

1. "Der Weg des Schicksals… Veni, Vidi, Fatum" [The Path of Destiny… I Came, I Saw, I Spoke]
2. "Die Verheissung (Interlude)" [The Promise (Interlude)]
3. "Deine Welt" [Your World]
4. "Das Orakel (Interlude)" [The Oracle (Interlude)]
5. "Der Blaubeermund" [The Blueberry-Mouth]
6. "Der Lockruf (Interlude)" [The Call (Interlude)]
7. "Das Omen (im Kreis des Bösen)" [The Omen (in the Circle of Evil)]
8. "Schwarze Göttin (Interlude)" [Black Goddess (Interlude)]
9. "Morgane le Fay"
10. "Sternensturm (Interlude)" [Star Storm (Interlude)]
11. "Im Zeichen des Zodiak" [In the Sign of the Zodiac]
12. "Die Brücke ins Licht (Interlude)" [The Bridge into the Light]
13. "Laetitia" [Happiness]
14. "Die Befreiten (Interlude)" [The Freed (Interlude)]
15. "Friedenshymne" [Peace Hymn]
16. "Land der Hoffnung (Interlude)" [Land of Hope (Interlude)]
17. "Anderwelt (Laterna magica)" [Otherworld (Magic Lantern)]
18. "Der Geist der Luft (Interlude)" [The Spirit of the Air (Interlude)]
19. "Espíritu del Aire" [Spirit of the Air]
20. "Lauf der Zeit (Interlude)" [The Passage of Time (Interlude)]
21. "Das Rad des Schicksals" [The Wheel of Fate]
22. "Das Erwachen (Interlude)" [The Awakening (Interlude)]
23. "Schwarze Sonne" [Black Sun]
24. "In den Fängen von… (Interlude)" [In the Clutches of… (Interlude)]
25. "Mysteria" [Mysteries]
26. "Die Rückkehr der Ewigkeit (Interlude)" [The Return of Eternity (Interlude)]
27. "Ein neuer Tag" [A New Day]

=== Re-Release ===
Released on 10 November 2003 from Polydor Records.

1. "Seit Anbeginn der Zeit..."
2. "Das Erwachen" - Interlude
3. "Schwarze Sonne"
4. "Der Lockruf" - Interlude
5. "Das Omen (im Kreis des Bösen)"
6. "Die Verheissung" - Interlude
7. "Deine Welt"
8. "Lauf der Zeit" - Interlude
9. "Das Rad des Schicksals"
10. "Spirale des Todes" - Interlude
11. "Spiegelbilder"
12. "Das Orakel" - Interlude
13. "Der Blaubeermund"
14. "Sternensturm" - Interlude
15. "Im Zeichen des Zodiak"
16. "Die Brücke ins Licht" - Interlude
17. "Laetitia"
18. "Das Rätsel" - Interlude
19. "Der Prophet"
20. "Land der Hoffnung" - Interlude
21. "Anderwelt" (Laterna Magica)
22. "Im Schlafe des Lichts" - Interlude
23. "Carpe Noctem"
24. "In den Fängen von..." - Interlude
25. "Mysteria"
26. "Friedhof der Engel" - Interlude
27. "Die Runen von Asgard"
28. "Schwarzer Traum" - Interlude
29. "Mondengel"
30. "So steht es geschrieben..." - Interlude
31. "Wer den Wind sät..."
32. "Endzeit" - Interlude
33. "Jetzt ist es still"

=== DVD ===
Die Prophezeiung (DVD) (2003)
Nr.	Title
Die Prophezeiung (videos with background-pictures)
01	Seit Anbeginn der Zeit...
02	Die Verheissung (Interlude)
03	Deine Welt
04	Schwarzer Traum (Interlude)
05	Mondengel
06	Der Lockruf (Interlude)
07	Das Omen im Kreis des Bösen
08	Lauf der Zeit (Interlude)
09	Das Rad des Schicksals
10	Das Orakel (Interlude)
11	Der Blaubeermund
12	Sternensturm (Interlude)
13	Im Zeichen des Zodiak
14	Die Brücke ins Licht (Interlude)
15	Laetitia
16	Das Rätsel (Interlude)
17	Der Prophet
18	Land der Hoffnung (Interlude)
19	Anderwelt (Laterna magica)
20	In den Fängen von... (Interlude)
21	Mysteria
22	Friedhof der Engel (Interlude)
23	Die Runen von Asgard
24	Das Erwachen (Interlude)
25	Schwarze Sonne
26	Endzeit (Interlude)
27	Jetzt ist es still
Die Prophezeiung (Klassik Edition) (videos with background-pictures)
28	Der Weg des Schicksals.. veni vidi fatum
29	Die Befreiten (Interlude)
30	Friedenshymne
31	Der Geist der Luft (Interlude)
32	Espiritu del aire
33	Die Rückkehr der Ewigkeit (Interlude)
34	Ein neuer Tag
Musikvideos
01	Vater Unser
02	E Nomine (Denn sie wissen nicht was sie tun)
03	Wolfen (Das Tier in mir)
04	Mitternacht
05	Deine Welt
06	Das Omen im Kreis des Bösen
07	Making Of: Mitternacht
08	Making Of: Deine Welt
09	Making Of: Das Omen im Kreis des Bösen
Live-acts at The Dome
01	Mitternacht
02	Wolfen (Das Tier in mir)
Diskografien
01	Alben
02	Singles
