= Rolf Schult =

German actor (1927–2013)

Rolf Schult (16 April 1927 – 13 March 2013) was a German actor who specializes in dubbing. He provided the German dub for actor Robert Redford, among many others. Until the film Hannibal (2001), he provided the voice for Anthony Hopkins, before he was replaced by Joachim Kerzel, and dubbed Patrick Stewart for much of his career.

He has also collaborated with the German trance/techno-band E Nomine on a number of their albums.

Schult died on Wednesday, March 13, 2013, in Munich at the age of 85. Rolf Schult's last appearance was in 2009, when he dubbed Patrick Stewart in a brief appearance in the film "X-Men Origins: Wolverine".
