= Jean Van Leeuwen =

American author (1937–2025)

Jean Van Leeuwen (December 26, 1937 – March 3, 2025) was an American children's book author, of over forty children's books, including the Oliver Pig series, and Bound for Oregon.

== Background ==
Van Leeuwen was born in Glen Ridge, New Jersey, on December 26, 1937, and raised in Rutherford, New Jersey. She studied journalism at Syracuse University, and worked for TV Guide and as a book editor for several years.

Van Leeuwen and her husband, Bruce Gavril, had two children. She died from cancer at her home in Chappaqua, New York, on March 3, 2025, at the age of 87.

== Career ==
=== The Great Mouse Gang Series ===
Van Leeuwen wrote five children's novels about a gang of three mice in New York City, led by the daredevil Marvin, who prefers to be called "Merciless Marvin the Magnificent". His two cohorts in adventure are the scholarly Raymond ("the Rat") and the sensitive, explosive-loving Fats ("the Fuse", although his birth name is revealed to be Dudley in the most recent story). Originally, the trio lived in the Bijou Theater, but Marvin led them in a semi-successful robbery of a cheese shop down the street, and they temporarily moved in there. At the start of the second story, they move into a dollhouse in the toy section of Macy's Department Store, and all subsequent adventures have either taken place or begun there. All titles of the gang's stories have been titled "The Great something-or-other", and take place in Manhattan(except for the fourth, which begins when the gang is accidentally sent to Vermont in a care package).

- The Great Cheese Conspiracy (1969)
  In 1986, the book was adapted into a Czechoslovak animated film The Great Cheese Robbery (Czech: Velká sýrová loupež) directed by Václav Bedřich.
- The Great Christmas Kidnaping Caper (1975)
- The Great Rescue Operation (1981)
- The Great Summer Camp Catastrophe (1992)
- The Great Googlestein (Guggenheim) Museum Mystery (2003)

=== Oliver and Amanda ===
- Tales of Oliver Pig (1979)
- More Tales of Oliver Pig (1981)
- Amanda Pig and Her Big Brother Oliver (1982)
- Tales of Amanda Pig (1983)
- More Tales of Amanda Pig (1985)
- Oliver, Amanda, and Grandmother Pig (1987)
- Oliver and Amanda's Christmas (1989)
- Oliver Pig at School (1990)
- Amanda Pig on Her Own (1991)
- Oliver and Amanda's Halloween (1992)
- Oliver and Amanda and the Big Snow (1995)
- Amanda Pig, Schoolgirl (1997)
- Amanda Pig and Her Best Friend Lollipop (1998)
- Oliver and Albert, Friends Forever (2000)
- Amanda Pig and The Awful Scary Monster (2003)
- Oliver the Mighty Pig (2004)
- Amanda Pig and the Really Hot Day (2005)
- Oliver Pig and the Best Fort Ever (2006)
- Amanda Pig, First Grader (2007)
- Amanda Pig and the Wiggly Tooth (2008)
