= The Great Cheese Robbery (1986 film) =

Czechoslovak animated film

The Great Cheese Robbery (Czech: Velká sýrová loupež (1986), German: Die große Käseverschwörung (1987)) is a 47-minute Czechoslovak-German feature-length animated film directed by Václav Bedřich. The film is a comedy about three mice living in a cinema. After watching many thriller films they plot a "great cheese robbery". It is a parody of The Great Train Robbery. The film is based on the children's book by Jean Van Leeuwen The Great Cheese Conspiracy, first published in 1969.

Bedřich was both the director and a screenwriter, including character design. It was his longest animation.

In 1991 an English-language version was dubbed by CINAR under the title The Great Cheese Conspiracy, i.e., matching the title of the original book.

== Plot ==
Three mice, the enterprizing Marvin, the wise Rajmond and the good-natured Tlouštík (Fatty) live in a movie theatre and their favorite pastime is to watch crime films. They live off what they can steal from the movie watchers, until Marvin comes up with an idea of a major heist. After all, they have seen plenty of films and know all tricks and stumbling blocks of a robbery, although they are somewhat confused about the human ways: "What's the point of money if you can't eat it?". Marvin sees (but first smells) a "mice paradise", an Italian cheese shop, and it becomes their target. The local cat Giovanni is a minor obstacle, and after careful planning they eventually rob the shop. However upon exit they trigger the security alarm and are stopped by the police. However the sympathetic shop owner Martinelli forgives them and gives them shelter.

== Voice actors ==
In German version the mice names are Marvin, Konrad and Knut.

- Marvin (Velký Tvrdý Marvin, "Big Tough Marvin"): Josef Dvořák, German: Joachim Kerzel, English dubbing: Michael Rudder
- Rajmond: Petr Nárožný, German: Peer Augustinski, English dubbing: Arthur Grosser
- Tlouštík: Luděk Sobota, German: Walter Gontermann, English dubbing: Mark Hellman
- Cheese shop owner Jan Faltýnek German: Jochen Kolenda, English: Dean Hagopian
- Narrator: Vlastimil Hašek, German: Joachim Kerzel

== Crew ==
- Director: Václav Bedřich
- Scenario: Václav Bedřich
- Screenplay: Gert K. Müntefering and Alena Munková
- Composer: Petr Skoumal

== Reception and influence ==
The Chech punk group V.T.Marvin took its name from Velký Tvrdý Marvin ("Big Tough Marvin").
