= In Nomine Aeternitatis =

Studio album by Dargaard
- Released: 14 March 2000
- Recorded: 1999
- Genre: Neoclassical dark wave, dark ambient
- Length: 51:42
- Language: English, German, Latin
- Label: Draenor
- Producer: Tharen, Elisabeth Toriser

Dargaard chronology
Eternity Rites (1998)	In Nomine Aeternitatis (2000)	The Dissolution of Eternity (2001)

Professional ratings
Review scores
Source	Rating
Allmusic	3/5 stars

In Nomine Aeternitatis is the second studio album by the Austrian neoclassical dark wave band Dargaard. It was released on 28 November 2000 on Napalm Records.

The music is performed in melancholic dark mood with romantic elements and symphonized sounds. Unlike the first album in which Tharen had substantial hold on the singing, in this one he mostly left the vocals to Elisabeth. The songs were composed and programmed at Stronghold Dargaard during the years of 1998 and 1999 and recorded, mixed and mastered by Georg Hrauda and Tharen at Tonstudio Hoernix in 1999.

In Nomine Aeternitatis means In the Name of Eternity in Latin.

== Track listing ==
No.	Title	Length
1.	"Εν Χειμωνι - Dark Horizons" ("In Winter - Dark Horizons")	05:50
2.	"Underworld Domain"	05:49
3.	"Pantheon in Flames"	02:20
4.	"The Infinite"	05:40
5.	"Temple of the Morning Star"	01:45
6.	"Caverna Obscura" ("Shadowy Cave")	05:56
7.	"Only the Blind Can See..."	07:12
8.	"In Signo Mortis" ("In a Sign of Death")	05:32
9.	"The March of Shadows"	03:05
10.	"In Nomine Aeternitatis" ("In the Name of Eternity")	04:16
11.	"The Seas of Oblivion"	04:17
Total length:		51:42

== Credits ==
- Tharen – all instruments, vocals
- Elisabeth Toriser – singing|vocals
