= Hail and Farewell =

Traditional military event

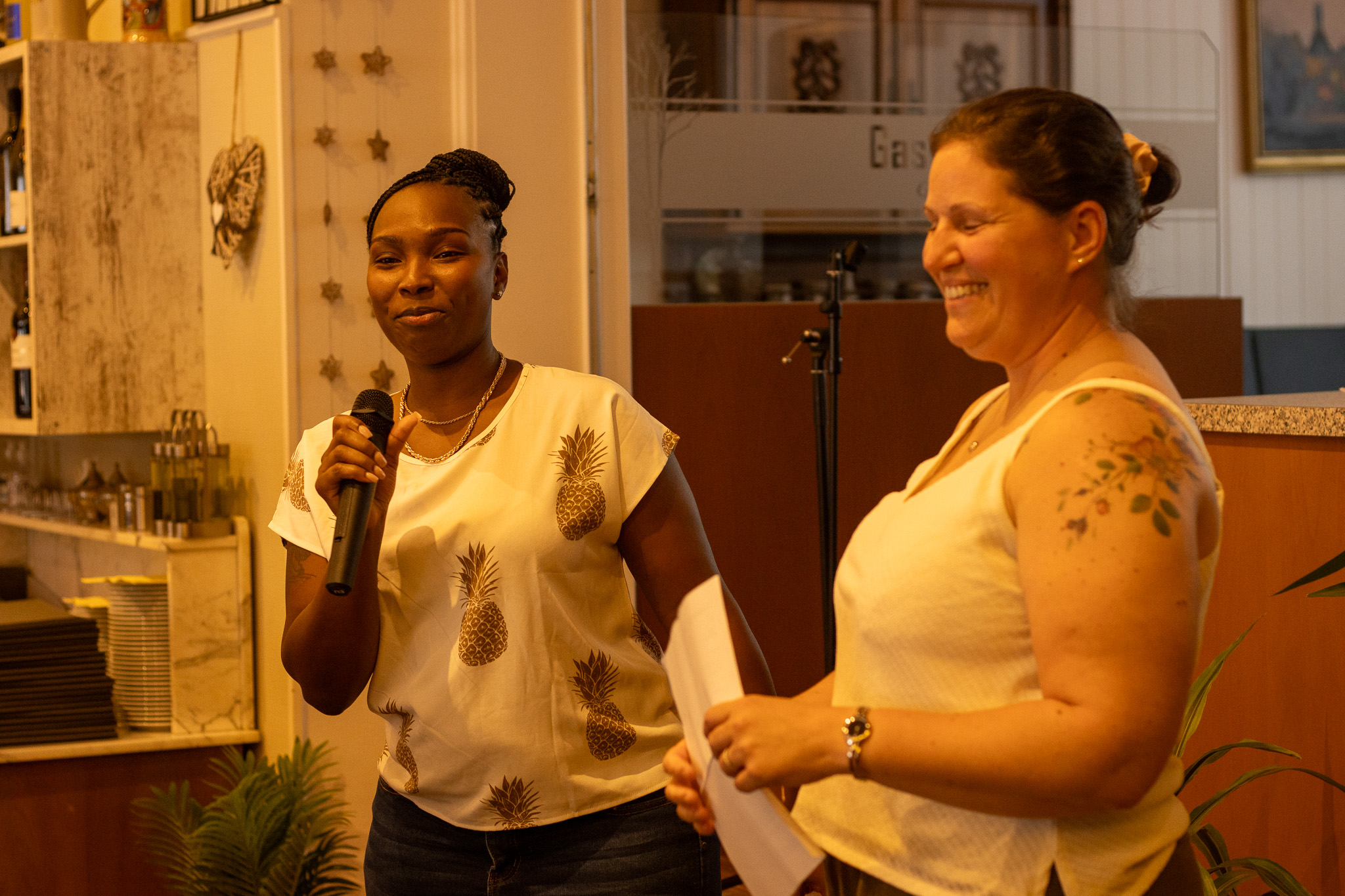
US Army soldiers and family members at a Hail and Farewell event for the 5th Battalion, 7th Air Defense Artillery Regiment in Baumholder, Germany

Hail and Farewell (a translation of ave atque vale, last words of the poem Catullus 101) is a traditional military event whereby those coming to and departing from an organization are celebrated. This may coincide with a change in command, be scheduled on an annual basis, or be prompted by any momentous organizational change. It is a time to honor those who have departed the unit and thank them for their service. At the same time it is a welcome to those who are joining and introduces them to the special history and traditions of their new organization. This celebration builds organizational camaraderie and esprit de corps. It supports a sense of continuity through change.

== United States ==
For the United States Army, a Hail and Farewell is most often celebrated at a formal dining in when there is a change in command. This provides the unit with a formal setting in which to welcome the new commander and honor the old commander. Some units may elect a less formal Dining Out in which family members and other non-military guests are encouraged to take part in the unit change. There are no official requirements outlined by the United States Army to have a Hail and Farewell celebration. It is up to each unit to carry out this tradition as they see fit.

The United States Navy, on the other hand, has specified that by custom the ship's officers must give a formal dinner when their new captain arrives. There may also be a formal dinner for the departing captain and these may be combined into one formal Hail and Farewell dinner.
