= Eternity Rites =

Studio album by Dargaard
- Released: 23 October 1998
- Recorded: 1998 at Hoernix Studios
- Genre: Neoclassical dark wave, dark ambient
- Length: 47:36
- Language: English, Latin
- Label: Draenor
- Producer: Tharen

Dargaard chronology
Eternity Rites (1998)	In Nomine Aeternitatis (2000)

Eternity Rites is the debut studio album by the Austrian neoclassical dark wave band Dargaard, released in 1998 by Napalm Records under the Draenor Productions banner. The album was recorded and mixed at Hoernix Studios by Georg Hranda and Tharen during 1998. It instills a dark rhythm and develops "a climactic fairytale full of medieval/folk themes beautifully composed and perfectly performed".

The album includes eleven tracks, two of which are different parts of the song Eternity Rites. All the tracks are composed in mixture of neo-classical, folk and dark ambient music.

The vocals of Elisabeth Toriser, the soprano with an operatic voice is also highly appreciated through most of reviews, which is "both clear and powerful, yet strangely delicate."

== Track listing ==
No.	Title	Length
1.	"Eternity Rite (Pt. 1: Sight from the Abyss/The Confession and Prophecy)"	5:49
2.	"Demon Eyes"	5:08
3.	"Fuer grissa est drauka" ("The Bringer of Death")	4:10
4.	"Down to the Halls of the Blind"	3:24
5.	"Nightvision"	3:06
6.	"Arcanum Mortis" ("The Mystery of Death")	3:32
7.	"Eternity Rite (Pt. 2: Invocation and Bounding)"	6:43
8.	"Temple of the Moon"	3:43
9.	"...Of Broken Stones"	5:45
10.	"Seelenlos" ("Soulless")	4:09
11.	"Transfer Complete"	2:07
Total length:		47:36

- "Fuer grissa ost drauka" is the title given to Richard Rahl, a character in the epic fantasy book series The Sword of Truth by Terry Goodkind. The title is in High D'Haran language and has several meanings: "the bringer of death", "the bringer of spirits" and "the bringer of the underworld".
- The lyrics to "Arcanum Mortis" are taken from Ovid's Fasti, Book II, 571-582.

== Credits ==
- Tharen - all instruments, vocals
- Elisabeth Toriser - vocals
