= Michael Chevalier =

German voice actor (1933–2011)

Michael Chevalier (born 14 May 1933; died 11 July 2011) was a German voice actor born in Berlin. He provided the German dub voices for Charles Bronson (Once Upon a Time in the West), Robert Shaw (Jaws), Richard Harris (The Wild Geese), Omar Sharif (Doctor Zhivago), Oliver Reed (Gladiator), Steve McQueen (The Cincinnati Kid), Dan Blocker (Bonanza) and William Conrad (Jake and the Fatman). He also provided dubs for Marlon Brando, Paul Newman and Sean Connery. From 2003, he withdrew from dubbing work and the public eye. In 2004, he received the German Prize for Synchronization for his outstanding overall work. Chevalier was the grandson of the painter Friedrich Klein-Chevalier.

He collaborated with the German trance/techno-band E Nomine on a number of their albums.
