= Rise and Fall (Dargaard album) =

Studio album by Dargaard
- Released: 22 March 2004
- Recorded: 2003–2004 at Pure Sound Studio
- Genre: Neoclassical dark wave, dark ambient
- Length: 50:12
- Language: English, Latin
- Label: Draenor

Dargaard chronology
The Dissolution of Eternity (2001)	Rise and Fall (2004)

Rise and Fall is the fourth studio album by the Austrian neoclassical dark wave band Dargaard.

== Track listing ==
No.	Title	Length
1.	"Rise and Fall"	10:47
2.	"Bearer of the Flame"	4:50
3.	"Niobe"	4:39
4.	"Takhisis Dance"	3:58
5.	"Winter"	7:02
6.	"Ave Atque Vale" ("Hail and Farewell")	6:12
7.	"Queen of the Woods"	6:42
8.	"Ancestors of Stone"	6:02
9.	"The Halls of Dargaard" (digipack version bonus track)	6:04
Total length:		56:16

== Credits ==
- Tharen - all instruments, vocals
- Elisabeth Toriser - vocals
