= Highland (band) =

German dance/hip hop project

- Origin: Germany
- Genres: Dance, alternative hip hop, europop
- Years active: 1999–2002; 2008
- Labels: EastWest Records Germany
- Members: Nicole Heiland; Dean Burke
- Past members: Lady Scar

Highland is a German dance/hip hop project.

== History ==
Their music is recognizable for using Italian and sometimes Latin lyrics together with hip hop beats and rapping performed in English. The members of the act were the singer Nicole Heiland and the rappers Dean "Dirty-D" Burke and Patrice "Lady Scar" Gansau. Their music is written and produced by Mike Michaels, Mark "MM" Dollar and Mark Tabak, who are also behind the artists and bands such as Music Instructor, The Boyz and Ayman. Dean Burke has also worked with Music Instructor and Lunatics. Highland as an act; however, existed only for a few years. The lyrics of the tracks were written by Hardy Krech, Mark Nissen and Toni Berardi. The project was produced by Hardy Krech and Mark Nissen (Elephant Music) and co-produced by Triple M. and Andreas Pohle.

Their first single, "Bella Stella", the refrain of which was performed in Italian by Nicole Heiland and the raps performed by Dean Burke and Patrice "Lady Scar" Gansau in English, was released in late 1999, which eventually became a hit entering the top-10 both in Germany and Austria, also reaching number 12 in Switzerland. In 2000, they released the album also entitled Bella Stella, which peaked at number 52 in Germany and number 87 in Switzerland. Three more singles were released: "Se Tu Vuoi", which structure-wise followed the same technique as its predecessor peaking at number 20 on the German single chart and number 12 on the Swiss chart, their third single "Solo Tu" charted moderately reaching number 47 in Germany and 62 in Switzerland, this single; however, differed from the former two singles. It was a pleasant europop dance track with only Nicole Heiland's refrain performed in Italian as usual and the spoken/singing produced in English by Patrice "Lady Scar" Gansau. The fourth single "Veni Vidi Vici" (which sounded very much like the first two singles) consisted (on the album version) out of only female rap produced by Gansau and the refrain performed in Italian by Heiland, while the radio version and extended mix also contained male rap produced by Dean Burke. The track managed to chart only in Germany eventually peaking at 59 position on the single chart.

In 2001, Highland also released the single Magic Fortuna, which was based on "O Fortuna", a movement from Carl Orff's Carmina Burana. The song comprised Eurodance tunes as well as Heiland's vocals (in Latin) performed along with other male-vocals in the background. The single peaked at number 33 in Germany and charted moderately in other German-speaking countries peaking at number 80 in Switzerland and 66 in Austria.

The act released their second album Dimmi Perché in 2008. It featured remastered versions of some of their previous hits, this time without the rap performances, and eight new songs. Dean Burke contributed to new material, but Patrice Gansau was not featured on the album. While somewhat formulaic (Occhi Blue very closely resembles Se Tu Vuoi, as one example), the original songs had plenty of fresh ideas, some of them similar to the works of Highland's fellow German group, Lesiëm.

Nicole Heiland was involved in the short-lived gothic pop rock band Heiland with guitarist and vocalist Martin Otto.

== Discography ==
=== Singles ===
Year	Single	Peak chart positions				Album
Year	Single	GER	AUT	SUI	EUR	Album
1999	"Bella Stella"	8	12	7	19	Bella Stella
2000	"Se Tu Vuoi"	20	—	12	53	Bella Stella
2000	"Solo Tu"	47	—	62	—	Bella Stella
2001	"Veni Vidi Vici"	59	—	—	—	Bella Stella
2001	"Magic Fortuna"	33	66	80	—	Dimmi Perché
"—" denotes items which were not released in that country or failed to chart.

=== Studio albums ===
Year	Album details	Peak chart positions	
Year	Album details	GER	SUI
2000	"Bella Stella": Released: 2000; Label: Triple M, Eastwest Records (Germany); Formats: CD	52	87
2008	Dimmi Perché: Released: 2008; Label: Eastwest Records (Germany); Formats: CD	—	—
"—" denotes items which were not released in that country or failed to chart.
