= Ulrike Endesfelder =

German physicist

- Born: 4 July 1983 (age 43)
- Education: University of Bonn (Diploma), Stony Brook University, Bielefeld University (PhD)
- Known for: Single-Molecule Microbiology
- Scientific career
- Fields: Biophysics, Cell Biology, Single Molecule Techniques, Super-Resolution Microscopy
- Workplaces: University of Würzburg; Goethe University Frankfurt; Max Planck Institute for Terrestrial Microbiology; Carnegie Mellon University; University of Bonn
- Thesis: Quantitative localization-based super-resolution microscopy: Concepts and applications (2012)
- Website: Endesfelder Lab

Ulrike Endesfelder (born 4 July 1983) is a German physicist known for her work in Single-Molecule Microbiology and Super-resolution microscopy. She is the Group Leader of the Research Group Endesfelder and full professor (W3) at the Institute for microbiology and biotechnology at the University of Bonn in Bonn, Germany.

== Early life and education ==
Endesfelder was born on 4 July 1983. From 2002 to 2008, she studied Physics, Astronomy, and Microbiology at the University of Bonn in Bonn, Germany and Stony Brook University, NY, USA. In 2012, she earned her Ph.D. in Physics at the Department of Applied Laser Physics and Laser Spectroscopy at Bielefeld University, Germany.

== Career and research ==
For her postgraduate work, Endesfelder worked as a postdoctoral researcher at the Department of Biotechnology and Biophysics, University of Würzburg (2012/13) and at the Department of Physical and Theoretical Chemistry, Goethe University Frankfurt (2013/14).

Between 2014 and 2020, Endesfelder was a Group Leader at the Department of Systems and Synthetic Microbiology at the Max Planck Institute for Terrestrial Microbiology in Marburg, Germany.

Subsequently, Endesfelder relocated to the United States to work as an Associate Professor (tenure track) at the Department of Physics at the Carnegie Mellon University in Pittsburgh, PA between 2020 and 2021.

Since 2021, Endesfelder has been a Full Professor (W3) at the Institute for Microbiology & Biotechnology at the University of Bonn, Germany.

Endesfelder's group uses tailored quantitative single-molecule tracking and structural super-resolution microscopy methods to understand molecular processes in cells. They are particularly keen on exploring microbial cell biology using fluorescence microscopy and biophysical methods.

Endesfelder has spoken at workshops and conferences microbiology and microscopy.

Since 2021, Endesfelder has been an associate editor of Biophysical Reports, an open-access journal run by the Biophysical Society.

== Awards and honours ==
- 2015–2020 Member of Die Junge Akademie at the Berlin-Brandenburg Academy of Sciences and Humanities and German National Academy of Sciences Leopoldina.
