= Joachim Kerzel =

German actor (1941–2026)

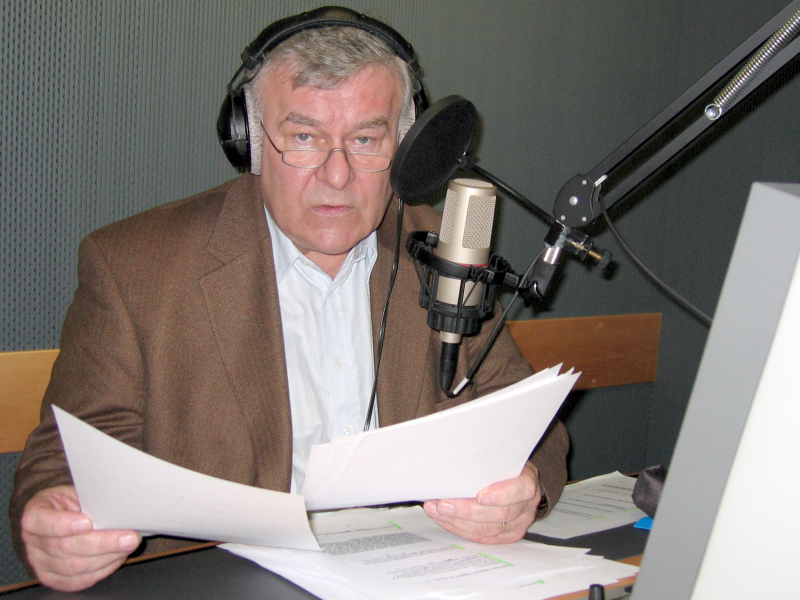
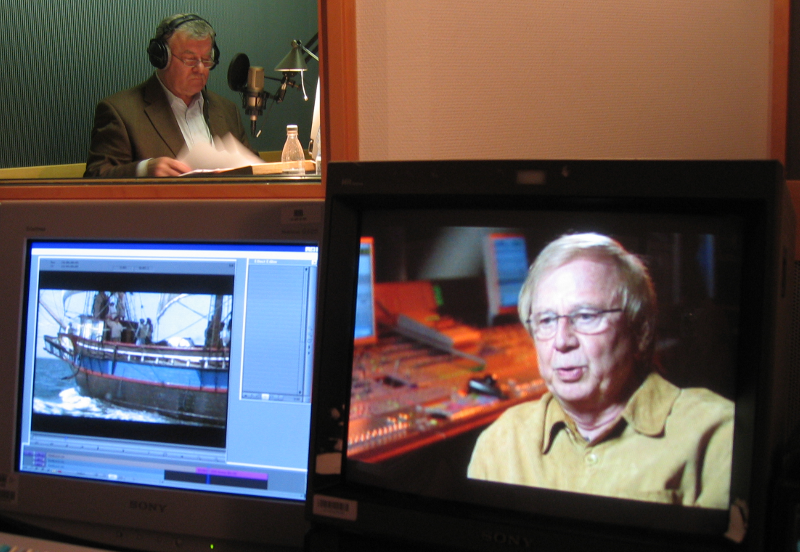
Kerzel in 2007

Joachim Kerzel (10 December 1941 – 20 July 2026) was a German actor who specialised in dubbing.

== Life and career ==
Kerzel was born in Zabrze on 10 December 1941, grew up in post-war Augsburg, and studied acting at the Hochschule für Musik und Theater in Hanover.

Kerzel was best-known for his voice acting and dubbing. He is considered to be one of Germany's most renowned voice actors of his generation, known for dubbing many internationally acclaimed actors in German. For decades, he was the main dubber for Jack Nicholson, Dustin Hoffman, and Anthony Hopkins. Among other actors he voiced multiple times were Dennis Hopper, Harvey Keitel, Robert De Niro, and Jean Reno. On television, Kerzel voiced Robert Wagner on Hart to Hart and It Takes a Thief, among other roles. Overall, the German Database for Synchronization lists over 1400 dubbing and voice roles between the 1960s and 2025 for Kerzel.

For his dubbing of Nicholson in the film About Schmidt, he was awarded the Germany Synchronisation Prize (Deutscher Preis für Synchron) in 2003. Kerzel also occasionally worked as a director of film and television synchronisations, for example on the German dubbing of Twin Peaks, where he also voiced Al Strobel in 16 episodes. Kerzel also served as narrator for audiobooks and had voice roles in radio plays and video games. He collaborated with the German trance/techno-band E Nomine on a number of their albums.

Kerzel also worked as a stage actor, for example for many years at the Theater am Kurfürstendamm in Berlin, and had body roles in a number of German film and television productions.

He was married to actress Maria Körber until her death in 2018. Kerzel died in Berlin on 20 July 2026, at the age of 84.

== Voice roles (selection) ==
- Die große Käseverschwörung
- Shadow Man (Legion)
- Spider-Man film series (J. Jonah Jameson)
- WALL-E (AUTO)
- Yu-Gi-Oh!: Duel Monsters (Narrator)
