= Das Testament (E Nomine album) =

Das Testament (The Testament)

Studio album by E Nomine
- Released: December 11, 1999; November 25, 2002 (Digitally Remastered Version)
- Genre: Electronic music Gregorian vocals
- Label: PolyGram

E Nomine chronology
Das Testament (The Testament) (1999)	Finsternis (2002)

Das Testament (The Testament) is the debut album of German musical project, E Nomine, released in 1999. A digitally remastered version of the album was later released in late 2002, with nearly double the original number of tracks.

Featured on the album is E Nomine's debut single "Vater Unser" which features the German synchronis speaker for Robert De Niro, Christian Brückner, speaking and chanting the Lord's Prayer. He also provides his vocals on the second single "E Nomine (Denn sie wissen nicht was sie tun)" which is featured on the Digitally Remastered Version of the album.

Das Testament also featured the German synchronis speakers for Al Pacino, Jack Nicholson, Nicolas Cage and John Travolta.

== Track listing (normal CD) ==
All tracks are written by Fritz Graner & Chris Tentum except where noted.

No.	Title	Writer(s)	Length
1.	"Am Anfang war... Die Schöpfung" ("In the Beginning was... The Creation")		1:12
2.	"Vater Unser" ("Lord's Prayer"")		3:30
3.	"E Nomine (Pontius Pilatus)" ("E Nomine (Pontius Pilatus)")		4:11
4.	"Die 10 Gebote" ("The 10 Commandments")		5:40
5.	"Das Abendmahl" ("The Communion")	Fritz, Chris, Michael Vanrose	3:35
6.	"Die Sintflut" ("The Deluge")		4:22
7.	"Himmel oder Hölle" ("Heaven or Hell")		3:40
8.	"Der Fürst der Finsternis" ("The Prince of Darkness")		4:39
9.	"Bibelworte des Allmächtigen" ("Biblical Quotations of the Almighty One")	Graner, Tentum, Vanrose	4:37
10.	"Die Posaunen von Jericho" ("The Trombones of Jericho")	Graner, Tentum, Vanrose	3:51
11.	"Ave Maria" ("Hail Maria")	Franz Schubert	3:50
12.	"Psalm 23"		4:47
13.	"Hallelujah" ("Hallelujah")	Graner, Tentum, Vanrose	3:52
14.	"Gott tanzte" ("God danced")	DJ Taylor, Flow	6:02

== Track listing (limited edition) (CD-2) ==
No.	Title	Length
1.	"Die Weihnachtsgeschichte" ("The Christmas Story")

== Track listing (digitally remastered version) ==
No.	Title	Length
1.	"Am Anfang war... Die Schöpfung" ("In the Beginning was... The Creation")
2.	"Vater Unser" ("Lord's Prayer")
3.	"Das Geständnis" ("The Confession")
4.	"E Nomine (Denn sie wissen nicht was sie tun" ("E Nomine (For they know not what they do")
5.	"Die Stimme des Herrn" ("The Voice of the Lord")
6.	"Die 10 Gebote" ("The 10 Commandments")
7.	"Der Verrat" ("The Betrayal")
8.	"Das Abendmahl" ("The Communion")
9.	"Vergeltung" ("Retaliation")
10.	"Die Sintflut" ("The Deluge")
11.	"Die Entscheidung" ("The Decision")
12.	"Himmel & Hölle" ("Heaven & Hell")
13.	"Garten Eden" ("Garden of Eden")
14.	"Der Fürst der Finsternis" ("The Prince of Darkness")
15.	"Die Mahnung" ("The Dunning")
16.	"Bibelworte des Allmächtigen" ("Biblical Quotations of the Almighty One")
17.	"Rückkehr aus Ägypten" ("Return from Egypt")
18.	"Die Posaunen von Jericho" ("The Trombones of Jericho")
19.	"Empfängnis" ("Conception")
20.	"Ave Maria" ("Hail Mary)
21.	"Der Herr ist mein Hirte" ("The Lord is my Shepherd")
22.	"Psalm 23"
23.	"Die Vorsehung" ("The Providence")
24.	"Der Befehl des König Herodes" ("The Command of King Herodes")
25.	"Himmelfahrt" ("Ascension")
26.	"Per l'Eternita" ("For Eternity")
27.	"Lord's Prayer" ("English Version of Vater Unser")

== Track listing (special gold edition) (CD-2) ==
No.	Title	Length
1.	"Die Weihnachtsgeschichte" ("The Christmas Story")
2.	"Der Lobgesang" ("The Praise")
3.	"Quia Respexit aus Magnificat von Johann Sebastian Bach"

== Chart position ==
Chart performance for Das Testament
Chart (1999)	Peak position
Austrian Albums (Ö3 Austria)	17
German Albums (Offizielle Top 100)	23
Swiss Albums (Schweizer Hitparade)	85
