= E Nomine =

German musical project

- Origin: Germany
- Genres: Monumental dance Gregorian vocals Techno / trance New-age
- Years active: 1999–2008
- Labels: PolyGram, Polydor, Universal
- Members: Christian "Chris Tentum" Weller; Senad Fuerzkelper Giccic
- Past members: Friedrich "Fritz" Graner
- Website: enomine-germany.de (archived)

E Nomine (Latin for "Out of the Name", from the In Nomine, "In the Name [of]") is a German musical project formed in 1999 by producers Christian Weller and Friedrich "Fritz" Graner. Their music, which they call monumental vocal style, is a combination of trance, techno, and vocals which closely resemble Gregorian singing and chanting. Other vocals are performed by German voice actors such as long-time collaborators Christian Brückner and Rolf Schult. The primary languages in the songs are German and Latin.

The project released its first album, Das Testament, in 1999. It was followed by Finsternis in 2002, Die Prophezeiung in 2003 and a compilation in 2004 (Das Beste aus... Gottes Beitrag und Teufels Werk), which also included new songs. No further official releases followed, but the project never officially ended. Two unreleased songs, Heilig and Excalibur, became public under various circumstances.

In 2008, the founders of E Nomine Weller and Graner started a new project, Schlafes Bruder. Their first album includes both of the unreleased songs that originated from the E Nomine project.

E Nomine's Christian-themed song "Vater Unser" (Our Father) and album Das Testament were very popular among the German public.

== History ==
E Nomine was founded by German producers Christian Weller ("Chris Tentum") and Friedrich Graner ("Sir Fritz") in 1999 after the huge success of the song "Vater Unser" (Our Father), which was included on their first album released that same year (Das Testament) and their most famous work as well. The project combines electronic sounds with recitations by guest voice actors, operatic chants and choirs, all performed by the Deutsche Oper Berlin, the same from the also German musical project Lesiëm.

Their first album was followed by Finsternis in 2002, which drew influences from horror films and occult themes, and Die Prophezeiung in 2003, which was especially inspired by stories of prophecies about the end of the world, the struggle between light and darkness, death and the afterlife. A special edition of Die Prophezeiung, with a classical rearrangement, was released under the title Die Prophezeiung: Klassik Edition.

In 2004, the project released their final work together, a compilation entitled Das Beste aus... Gottes Beitrag und Teufels Werk, which also presented new songs.

A long period of silence followed. The project's official website stopped receiving updates in early 2005. Eventually, Friedrich "Fritz" Graner left the project. After a few years with no news of the project, e-mail correspondence between a fan and Chris Tentum (Weller) revealed that the group was in the process of producing new material, due for release some time in the near future.

A year after this came to light, a new single entitled Heilig appeared on Amazon.de, due for release on December 28, 2007. The release date was pushed to mid-February 2008. Due to problems with the record company, hard copies were never shipped, and the song was only made available for download.

Sometime in mid 2008, various videos of an E Nomine performance emerged on several video sharing websites which contained a live music and acrobatic performance to select previously released work. It contained an introduction of "Das Beste aus... Gottes Beitrag und Teufels Werk", as well as the new "Heilig" and an unannounced new song "Excalibur" (whose actual name is "Erdenblut (Stahl von Avalon)"). This performance was dated to late 2007.

Fans were left speculating, until the former founders of E Nomine eventually emerged with a new project in 2008, Schlafes Bruder, a Hardrock band which uses Latin chorus. Their first album, released on March 13, 2013, includes both of the unreleased E Nomine songs, Heilig and Excalibur.

In 2023, E Nomine's entire musical libraries on Apple Music and Spotify were removed. Additionally, remastered versions of the three full-length albums Das Testament, Die Prophezeiung and Finsternis, and additionally the Klassik-Edition of Die Prophezeiung, were released. On YouTube, several of the new songs were uploaded to a new channel created in 2022. Several of the songs were released as new mixes, and some were released under new names, e.g. Nigrae legiones, which replaces Das Omen on Die Prophezeiung.

=== Speakers ===
The project had the collaboration of several actors in the narration of their songs.

- Christian Brückner in the songs: "Vater Unser", "E Nomine (Denn sie wissen nicht was sie tun)", "Das Abendmahl", "Vater Unser Part II (Psalm 23)", "Mitternacht", "Dracul's Bluthochzeit", "Deine Welt", "Das Omen (Im Kreis des Bösen)", "Mysteria", "Das Tier in mir".
- Martin Keßler in the songs: "Himmel & Hölle", "Ave Maria", "Aus dem Jenseits", "Carpe Noctem", "Opus Magnum".
- Frank Glaubrecht in the songs: "Der Fürst der Finsternis", "Hallelujah", "Der Exorzist", "Das Rad des Schicksals", "Die Posaunen von Jericho".
- Joachim Kerzel in the songs: "Die 10 Gebote", "Die Sintflut", "Per l'Eternita", "Das Tier in mir (Wolfen)".
- Michael Chevalier in the songs: "Zorn - Die 12 Verbotenen Töne", "Herr der Schatten", "Spiegelbilder".
- Thomas Danneberg in the songs: "Bibelworte des Allmächtigen", "Im Zeichen des Zodiak", "Nebelpfade".
- Eckart Dux in the songs: "Angst", "Die Nachtwache", "Wiegenlied".
- Rolf Schult in the songs: "Die Schwarzen Reiter", "Hexenjagd".
- Helmut Krauss in the songs: "Das Böse", "Schwarze Sonne".
- Otto Mellies in the songs: "Wer den Wind sät...", "Der Ring der Nibelungen".
- Joachim Tennstedt in the songs: "Exitus", "Friedenshymne".
- Jürgen Thormann in the songs: "Seit Anbeginn der Zeit", "Der Prophet".
- Manfred Lehmann in the song: "Séance".
- Wolfgang Pampel in the song: "Anderwelt (Laterna Magica)".
- Elmar Wepper in the song: "Die Runen von Asgard".
- Gerrit Schmidt-Foß in the song: "Laetitia".
- Elisabeth Günther in the song: "Morgane Le Fay".
- Tobias Meister in the song: "Mondengel".

== Discography ==
=== Albums ===
- Das Testament (The Testament; 1999)—PolyGram Records
- Finsternis (Darkness; 2002)—PolyGram Records
- Die Prophezeiung (The Prophecy; 2003)—Polydor Records
- Das Beste aus... Gottes Beitrag und Teufels Werk (The Best of... God's Contribution and the Work of the Devil; 2004)—Universal Records

Year	Title	Chart-Positions		
Year	Title	Germany	Austria	Switzerland
1999	Das Testament	23	17	85
2002	Finsternis	3	6	61
2003	Die Prophezeiung	12	18	76
2004	Das Beste aus… Gottes Beitrag und Teufels Werk ("The best of ... God's contribution and work of Satan")	30	37	-

An album called Das Dunkle Element ("The Dark Element") has appeared on some P2P sites. This is a fake album created with various remixes, interludes, the contents of Das Böse, Heilig, and some of the tracks on Die Prophezeiung Re-release and Klassik edition, as well as some of the Das Testament Digital remastering.

=== Re-issues and re-releases ===
- Finsternis (Limited Edition) (2002)
- Das Testament (Digitally remastered version) (2002)
- Das Testament (Gold Edition) (2003)
- Die Prophezeiung (Klassik Edition) (2003)
- Die Prophezeiung (Re-release) (2003)
- Das Beste aus... Gottes Beitrag und Teufels Werk (Limited Edition) (2004)

=== Singles ===
Year	Title	Album
1999	"Vater Unser"	Das Testament
2000	"E Nomine (Denn sie wissen nicht was sie tun)"	Das Testament
2001	"Mitternacht"	Finsternis
2002	"Das Tier in mir (Wolfen)"	Finsternis
2003	"Deine Welt"	Die Prophezeiung
2003	"Das Omen im Kreis des Bösen"	Die Prophezeiung
2003	"Schwarze Sonne"	Die Prophezeiung
2004	"Vater Unser Part II (Psalm 23)"	Gottes Beitrag und Teufels Werk
2005	"Das Böse"	Finsternis
2008	"Heilig"	Single

Year	Title	Chart-Positions		
Year	Title	Germany	Austria	Switzerland
1999	Vater Unser	4	1	10
2000	E Nomine (Denn Sie Wissen Nicht Was Sie Tun)	29	27	90
2001	Mitternacht	13	12	47
2002	Das Tier in mir (Wolfen) & Die Schwarzen Reiter	29	26	92
2002	Deine Welt	24	29	-
2003	Das Omen (Im Kreis des Bösen)	24	36	-
2003	Schwarze Sonne (feat. Ralf Moeller)	36	41	-
2004	Vater Unser Part II – Psalm 23	53	42	-
2005	Das Böse - EP	44	56	-
2007	Heilig	-	-	-

== See also ==
- Enigma
- Era
- Gregorian
- Lesiëm
