= Die Streuner =

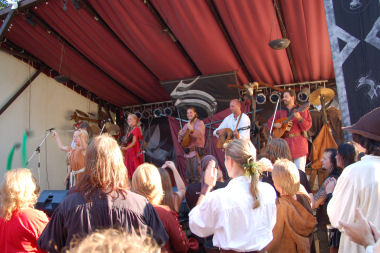
- Die Streuner at Köln-Fühlingen 2007

Background information
- Origin: Germany (Bonn)
- Genre: Medieval tavern music
- Years active: 1994-
- Website: http://www.streuner.de/

Die Streuner (The Strays in English) is a German band focusing in medieval music formed in 1994, which regularly plays at markets and festivals.

== Music style ==
The musical style of Die Streuner is focused in medieval music, and in particular in medieval tavern music. Their repertoire includes medieval drinking songs, old folk tunes and original, medieval- and Renaissance-like compositions. The lyrics of their songs (which include works from authors such as Friedrich Schiller, Heinrich Heine, François Villon and Erich Kaestner) are mostly in German, with some pieces in French and English.

The group was founded in 1994 by Miriam Petzold and Roland Kempen. Shortly after, Martin Seifert and Carsten Hickstein joined, while the arrival of Mathew Rouse gave the band its current quintet formation.

Among other features, they usually perform at both the Mittelalterlich Phantasie Spectaculum and the Kaltenberger Ritterturnier, where aliases are used by all five members.

Their albums have been released by the label Emmuty Records and produced by Roland Kempen. In 2009, an official fan club was created, named Wilden Gesellen.

== Discography ==
- 1998: Wein, Weib und Gesang (Wine, Women and Song) (Label: Emmuty Records/Vertrieb: Soulfood Music)
- 2000: Schnorrer, Penner, schräge Narren (Scroungers, Tramps, Crooked Fools) (Emmuty Records/Soulfood Music)
- 2002: Gebet eines Spielmanns (A Minstrel's Prayer) (Emmuty Records/Soulfood Music)
- 2002: Malleus (EP, Emmuty Records)
- 2004: Fürsten in Lumpen und Loden (Princes in Tatters and Loden) (Emmuty Records/Soulfood Music)
- 2007: Fau (V) (Emmuty Records/Soulfood Music)
- 2009: Süßer die Streuner nie klingen (Die Streuner Have Never Sounded So Sweet) (Emmuty Records)
- 2011: Hurra, na endlich (Hurrah! At Last!) (Emmuty Records)
