= The Holographic Principle =

2016 studio album by Epica

Studio album by Epica
- Released: 30 September 2016
- Recorded: December 2015 – May 2016
- Studio: Sandlane Recording Facilities (Rijen); Music Matrix Studio (Amsterdam); PaulyB Studios (Tampa)
- Genre: Symphonic metal
- Length: 72:03 (standard); 91:28 (digipak); 163:31 (earbook)
- Label: Nuclear Blast
- Producer: Joost van den Broek; Epica

Epica chronology
The Quantum Enigma (2014)	The Holographic Principle (2016)	The Solace System (2017)

Singles from The Holographic Principle
- 1. "Universal Death Squad" Released: 29 July 2016; 2. "Edge of the Blade" Released: 8 September 2016

The Holographic Principle is the seventh studio album by Dutch symphonic metal band Epica, released on 30 September 2016. The album was produced by Joost van den Broek and mixed by Jacob Hansen. The release date along with the album's title and cover was revealed on Epica's website on 3 June 2016, the tracklisting was revealed on 17 June 2016.

The album is notable for being the only release without band leader Mark Jansen as guitarist, as he only provides growled vocals; Isaac Delahaye played all guitars on the album. No reason has been given for this, either from Jansen or Delahaye.

The theme is the idea that the universe might be a digitally-generated hologram.

The tracks "Universal Death Squad" (released on 29 July 2016) and "Edge of the Blade" (released on 8 September 2016)., appeared as singles.

== Background, recording and writing ==
After Epica's 2014 album The Quantum Enigma was well received and the band toured Europe, Asia, Africa and both South and North America, halfway through 2015, Epica started a new journey – writing and recording their seventh studio album The Holographic Principle. "In between touring, we spent our time in the Sandlane Recording Facilities with producer Joost van den Broek" explained guitarist Isaac Delahaye. The songwriting process took a year, and resulted in 27 songs written, but 18 songs recorded; 12 were featured on the album, with the additional six songs recorded for a later release.

Speaking to Spark TV, the lead singer Simone Simons stated: "Since The Quantum Enigma was received so well, we set the bar so high, but we accepted the challenge to make an even better record. And we've done everything bigger than before – we had more orchestra, a bigger choir. We had so many different instruments – real, live instruments. Vocally, I put everything in the record that I can possibly do, and I'm very pleased with it." According to Simone, she has once again experimented a bit with her vocal approach on the new album. "With each record, I try to get the best out," she said. "And Joost (van den Broek), our producer, he's also very good at getting everything out of me. And the songs themselves, they just ask for a lot of variation in the vocal style. And I do opera, rock, pop, and in the ballads you hear the really soft voice. And, yeah, I can belt out some high notes as well." Even though "The Holographic Principle" is one of Epica's most ambitious offerings to date, the album doesn't sacrifice any of its instant appeal, something which Simone says was intentional. "I think it needs to be all in balance," she said. "We are, in heart, a metal band going in the symphonic direction. The orchestration, the choir is a little bit like the seventh and eighth bandmember of Epica, and that's something we'll always keep in there. And the choir parts are often very catchy, the choruses are very catchy. But on this record, besides having catchy melodies, we also wanted to have really groovy vocal lines. And that's something that we worked on as well; we changed up some things to make it less predictable." One of the aspects of Epica's sound which has been enhanced on "The Holographic Principle" is the growling vocal style of Epica guitarist and main songwriter Mark Jansen. "Well, it's Mark and it's actually our drummer as well," Simone said. "Mark is the main grunter, and our drummer, Ariën (van Weesenbeek), has a really nice, thick sound. So I don't know if he sang all the grunt parts as well, if he doubled them with Mark, but them together makes a totally new grunt sound, and I like it. Also, it changes it up a bit. Mark can do also really low grunts, he can do screams, and Ariën really has that deep sound to it." Simone also praised the contributions of Isaac Delahaye, who came into the band in 2009. "The guitars are definitely more brutal," she said. "Also in the mix, the melodies, the grooves, and I think that ever since Isaac joined the band, not only as a songwriter but also the guitars have been lifted to a different level, and have become more interesting to listen to, I find myself. So I'm a big fan of his guitar work and also his songwriting."

Before album's release, Epica release a three part in-studio documentary about their journey with the album recording. The videos were uploaded to Epica's YouTube channel and revealed on their website on 18 July 2016, 25 July 2016 and 24 August 2016 respectively.

== Concept ==
Mark Jansen commented on the concept of the album: "'The Holographic Principle' deals with the near future wherein virtual reality has taken off and allows people to create their own virtual worlds which can't be distinguished from 'reality as we know it.' This raises the question whether our current reality is a kind of virtual reality in itself, a hologram. This implies the existence of a higher reality which we currently do not have access to. The lyrics challenge you to think out of the box, to reconsider everything you thought you know for sure and to be open-minded towards recent revolutions in science. Fasten your seat belts and get ready for a ride as nothing appears to be what it seems in our holographic universe."

== Songs ==
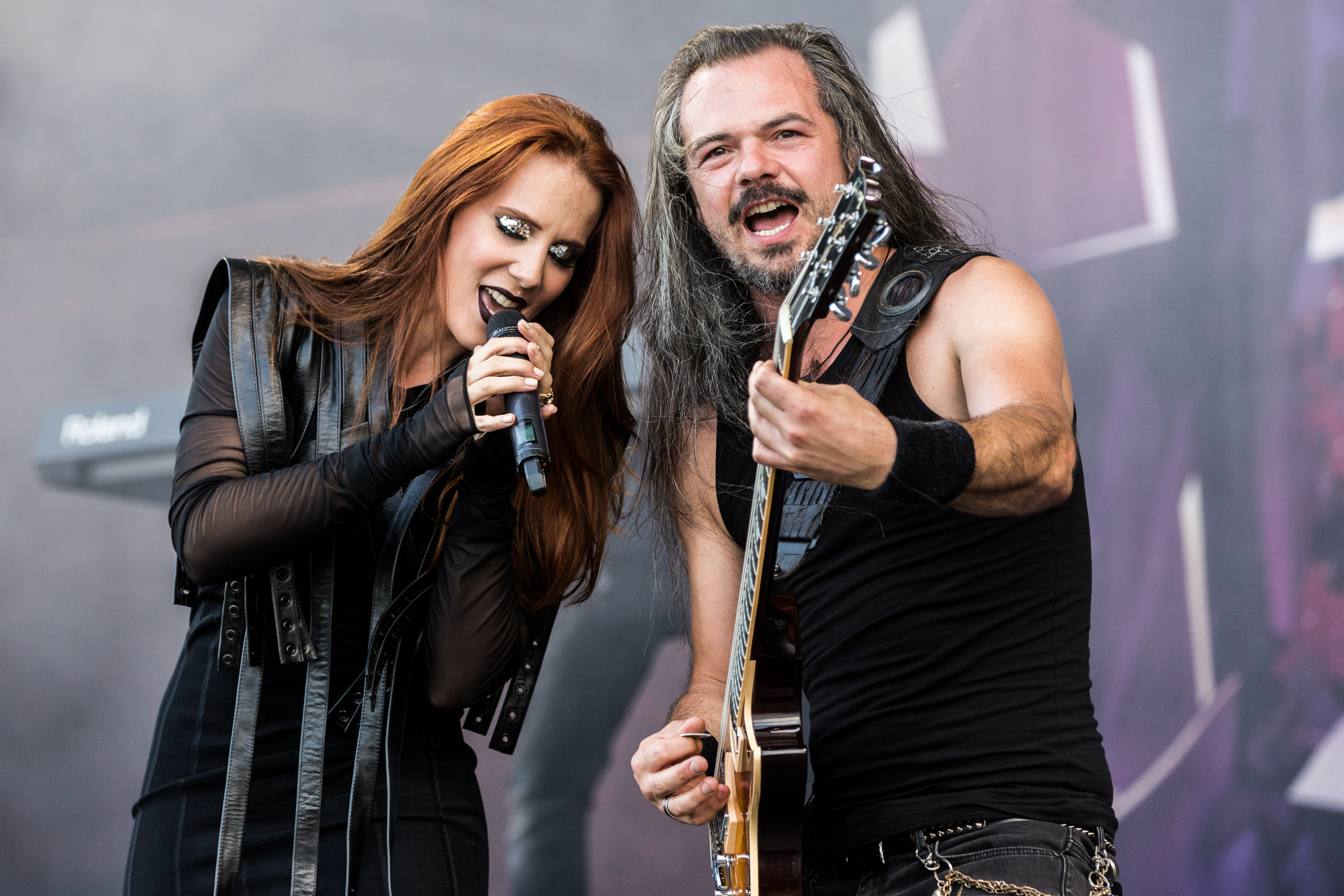
Simone Simons, Epica's lead singer and frontwoman, and guitarist Isaac Delahaye promoting the album on tour.

"Eidola" is the first track that appears on the album. Mark Jansen and Simone Simons said about the track: “The title comes from the ancient Greek for phantom or image, and it’s where the word ‘idol’ comes from. The idea is that after death, it's all that remains of the body. After I had written the music for Eidola, I felt there was something missing so our keyboard player Coen (Janssen) rebuilt it with many new parts and it became massive. He added an orchestra which gives a cinematic feel and we have all these metal riffs going on. It's like a wild roller coaster ride.” The child vocals were provided by Coen Janssen's daughter Cato.

The second track on the album is entitled "Edge of the Blade" and Simone has stated: “The music for this one was written by our guitarist Isaac Delahaye, but the lyrics are mine. I’m singing about self-acceptance and about not concentrating too much on the unimportant things in life. You have to nurture your soul and not focus on being perfect because who defines perfection anyway? A lot of people are obsessed with looks these days but if someone has a good heart, that will always come through. Edge of the blade is another way of saying 'the tip of the iceberg'; it’s very dangerous to get too wrapped up in unimportant things.”

"A Phantasmic Parade" was inspired by the movies Inception and The Matrix. The song is basically about The Matrix and the idea of manipulating your dreams to create new realities.

The lyrics of "Universal Death Squad" are about robots who decide they want to kill; that is, artificial intelligence that's programmed to fight in wars without anyone having to push a button. Mark Jansen said in an interview: "There have been many science fiction movies about robots who can think for themselves, but now it’s really happening. If you can put emotions into robots and create sentient artificial intelligence, what’s the difference between a robot and a human? And what if we’re all robots but just don’t know it?"

The fifth track isn't actually part of the concept, but musically, it turned out to be one of the stronger songs so it was included on the album. "Divide and Conquer" talks about media only giving us one side of the story of what is going on in the Middle East, but when you dig deeper, you find layers of truth about natural resources, like oil, that are influencing the region. The media report on how the new political regime has brought democracy to the region but maybe the inhabitants were better off before. What the West are really delivering is mainly destruction. They're making people fight each other and when the West conquers, the big companies come in and make money.

Despite the title, "Beyond the Matrix" isn't about the movie. It's basically about being able to see that you're in a matrix, to see that you're in a cage. It's hard to be able to see beyond your immediate surroundings when you're trapped so you have to project yourself outside the matrix to understand. Musically, the song has quite a simple structure and the catchiest chorus, but the middle is completely wild.

The ballad "Once Upon a Nightmare" takes the seventh spot on the album and it's melancholic and has more of a themed vocal going through it than a chorus. “I’m a big fan of classic fairy tales and the lyrics were inspired by a dark German tale about the Alder King, or Erlking, who steals children’s souls. A lot of times, parents don’t take their children seriously, especially when it comes to seeing monsters in the closet so it’s a dark twist on fairy tales. It’s symbolic of being stuck in a life without a happy ending and how our innocence is taken away from us as soon as we’re born,” explained Simone Simons when asked about the song.

Mark Jansen said that he is most proud of the lyrics to "The Cosmic Algorithm" and explained the meaning behind the song: “It's about the man beneath the hologram. Machines operate in numbers and code, and you can find similar algorithms in nature, so literally the whole universe as we know it is built on mathematical calculations. When you start seeing the algorithms beneath everything, you start to question: why are we here? What does it all mean? And these questions come up in the lyrics. People have always searched for the meaning of life, but the answers are always the same: love, family, friends and helping each other.”

The lyrics of "Ascension – Dream State Armageddon" deal with waking up and realising that everything is a hologram, but there is a danger that if you truly did find the key to unlock the mystery of the universe, everything would implode. The message is that we shouldn't know everything.

"Dancing in a Hurricane" breaks away from the concept as well. The title comes from a line in Spectre (the James Bond film) and the lyrics were inspired by the refugee crisis. It's the idea of children trying to enjoy their childhood in an unsafe environment; they're literally dancing in a hurricane. The song's inspiration came from Simone Simons' concern about the well-being of her son and all the children around the world.

"Tear Down Your Walls" strays from the concept as well and it's the heaviest song on the album with some brutal parts. Mark Jansen explained: “Everybody has walls around them but if you never break them down, you’ll never make progress or grow. It starts with the sound of crows and they’re really important to the lyrics as well. In Shamanism, they’re the keepers of the sacred law and nothing escapes their sight. When we meditate on the crow, we are instilled with the wisdom to know ourselves beyond the limitations of one-dimensional thinking and laws. We're taught to appreciate the many dimensions of both reality and ourselves, and to learn to trust our intuition and personal integrity.”

The last track "The Holographic Principle – A Profound Understanding of Reality" sums up the concept of the whole album.

=== Unreleased songs ===
The band's singer Simone Simons said in an interview in August 2016: "We had 27 songs to choose from. Then we had to narrow it down to 18 songs which we recorded and mixed. Twelve went to the CD and the remaining six are in the corner waiting patiently to be released." In February 2017 Metal Rules reported the six unreleased songs to be Fight Your Demons, Wheel of Destiny, Architect of Light, Immortal Melancholy, Decoded Poetry, and The Solace System. The single Fight Your Demons was given out as part of the VIP package on Epica's Canadian tour in November 2016 on a CD. The CD single replaced the 7" vinyl due to pressing delays.

On June 23, 2017, the band announced that all six tracks would be released as "The Solace System".

== Release and artwork ==
'The Holographic Principle' was released digitally via iTunes and Spotify and both on CD and vinyl on 30 September 2016. To celebrate the release of The Holographic Principle, Epica played two release shows at their own Epic Metal Fest (Netherlands) at 013 in Tilburg on 1 October 2016 and also at the 1st edition of Brazil Epic Metal Fest at Audio in São Paulo 15 October 2016. There are 3 versions of the album - the standard edition, digipak and earbook. The earbook edition features two additional discs: The Acoustic Principle, which consists of 5 acoustic versions of songs from the main album with different names, and The Instrumental Principle, which features the instrumental versions of all tracks in the album. The digipak edition includes additional disc The Acoustic Principle.

The cover art for the album was revealed on Epica's website on 3 June 2016 and was created by Stefan Heilemann, who has also created the cover art for Epica's previous albums The Quantum Enigma and Requiem for the Indifferent. The back cover was unveiled 17 June 2016 together with tracklisting on Epica's website.

== Singles and music videos ==
On July 27, 2016, Epica announced through their Facebook website that the lead single "Universal Death Squad" would be released two days later. The song was released 29 July 2016 via iTunes along with its lyric video, that was uploaded to Epica's YouTube account. The video was shot and directed by Jens De Vos (who is also the guitarist for the Belgian metal band Off the Cross). The guitarist Mark Jansen said of the track: “This cool track is both heavy and melodic. Representative of the whole album, it has all the Epica elements you’re used to, but takes it to a new level. The lyrics of the song deal with advanced robotic legions with a self-determination to kill.” The song was then given two additional videos, both uploaded to Epica's YouTube channel. The first video was launched with the help of Slagwerkkrant at their website and it Is a drum playthrough by Epica's drummer Ariën van Weesenbeek. The second video was launched at Gear Gods and is a guitar playthrough by Epica's guitarist Isaac Delahaye.

"Edge of the Blade" was released as the second single via iTunes on 8 September 2016, accompanied by a video. The video was directed by De Vos and produced by Panda Productions. Coen Janssen said of the video: “We’re very happy with the way it turned out! This music video gives a glimpse into what to expect from our upcoming live shows."

On November 16, 2016, Epica released a lyric video for the track "Ascension – Dream State Armageddon". The video is compiled of footage shot at band's release show during Epic Metal Fest in Netherlands and was edited by Panda Productions.

"Beyond the Matrix" official music video was released on 11 January 2017 and was again directed and shot by De Vos from Panda Productions. Simone Simons commented: “The energy that lives within ‘Beyond the Matrix’ is extremely contagious. It will sweep you off your feet when the melodies enter your mind. The video embodies the spirit and liveliness of Epica. Transcend together with us and shine past the sky.”

== Critical reception ==
Professional ratings
Review scores
Source	Rating
Hardrock Haven	8/10 stars
Metal Hammer	4/5 stars
Metal Injection	9/10 stars
Metal Temple	4.5/5 stars
Ultimate Guitar Archive	8/10 stars

The Holographic Principle received positive reviews from critics, including an 8 out of 10 from Ultimate Guitar Archive and a 9 out of 10 from Metal Injection. In 2021, it was elected by Metal Hammer as the 10th best symphonic metal album of all time.

== Track listing ==
No.	Title	Lyrics	Music	Length
1.	"Eidola"	Mark Jansen	Coen Janssen, Jansen	2:39
2.	"Edge of the Blade"	Simone Simons	Isaac Delahaye, Epica	4:34
3.	"A Phantasmic Parade"	Simons	Ariën van Weesenbeek, Epica	4:36
4.	"Universal Death Squad"	Jansen	Delahaye, Epica	6:38
5.	"Divide and Conquer"	Jansen	Jansen, Epica	7:48
6.	"Beyond the Matrix"	Jansen	Delahaye, Epica	6:26
7.	"Once Upon a Nightmare"	Simons	Janssen, Epica	7:08
8.	"The Cosmic Algorithm"	Jansen	Delahaye, Epica	4:54
9.	"Ascension - Dream State Armageddon"	Jansen	Rob van der Loo, Epica	5:16
10.	"Dancing in a Hurricane"	Simons	Janssen, Epica	5:26
11.	"Tear Down Your Walls"	Jansen	Jansen, Epica	5:03
12.	"The Holographic Principle - A Profound Understanding of Reality"	Jansen	Jansen, Epica	11:35
Total length:				72:03

Disc 2: The Acoustic Principle
No.	Title	Lyrics	Music	Length
13.	"Beyond the Good, The Bad and the Ugly"	Jansen	Delahaye, Epica	4:29
14.	"Dancing in a Gypsy Camp"	Simons	Janssen, Epica	4:28
15.	"Immortal Melancholy"	Simons	Jansen, Van den Broek, Epica	3:13
16.	"The Funky Algorithm"	Jansen, Delahaye, Simons	Delahaye, Epica	3:30
17.	"Universal Love Squad"	Jansen	Delahaye, Epica	3:45
Total length:				91:28

=== Notes ===
- The earbook edition of the album includes a third disc with the instrumental versions of disc one.

== Personnel ==
Credits for The Holographic Principle adapted from liner notes.

Epica

- Simone Simons – lead and backing vocals
- Mark Jansen – growled vocals
- Isaac Delahaye – guitars, acoustic guitar, mandolin, balalaika, bouzouki, ukulele, orchestral toms, djembe, congas, bar chimes, tambourine, triangle, backing vocals, percussion, additional vocals
- Rob van der Loo – bass
- Coen Janssen – keyboards, grand piano, synthesizer, glockenspiel, xylophone, tubular bells, orchestral toms, gran casa, djembe, congas, finger cymbals, tambourine, accordion, wurlitzer, percussion, additional samples and effects
- Ariën van Weesenbeek – drums, timpani, spoken vocals on "Ascension – Dream State Armageddon", congas, djembe, beer can

Additional musicians

- Marcela Bovio – backing vocals (all tracks)
- Linda Janssen-van Summeren – backing vocals (all tracks)
- Cato Janssen – child's voice (track 1)
- Paul Babikian – elven king's voice (track 7)
- Maarten de Peijper – snare drum

Choir – Kamerkoor Pa'Dam

- Maria van Nieukerken – choir director
- Alfrun Schmid, Annemieke Klinkenberg-Nuijten, Dagmara Siuty, Martha Bosch, Ruth Becker, Silvia da Silva Martinho, Annette Stallinga, Annette Vermeulen, Cecile Roovers, Natascha Morsink, Guido Groenland, Joost van Velzen, Koert Braches, Matthijs Frankema, Previn Moore, Rene Veen, Allard Veldman, Andreas Goetze, Angus van Grevenbroek, Jan Douwes

Production

- Joost van den Broek – snare drum, percussion, backing vocals, additional vocals, recording, editing, engineering, mixing, orchestral arrangements, additional samples and effects
- Jacob Hansen – mixing, mastering
- Darius Van Helfteren – mixing, mastering
- Stefan Heilemann – artwork, cover art, cover design, illustration
- Gjalt Lucassen – Latin translation
- Jaap Toorenaar – Latin translation
- Ben Mathot – strings scoring
- Robin Assen – brass scoring, woodwinds scoring
- Jos Driessen – editing, engineering

Epica Orchestra

- Ben Mathot – violin
- Ian De Jong – violin
- Sabine Poiesz – violin
- Floortje Beljon – violin
- Loes Dooren – violin
- Vera Van Der Bie – violin
- Marieke De Bruijn – violin
- Mark Mulder – viola
- Frank Goossens – viola
- René Van Munster – celli
- Geneviève Verhage – celli
- Eilidh Martin – celli
- Jurgen Van Nijnatten – trumpet
- Marnix Coster – trumpet
- Henk Veldt – French horn
- Alex Thyssen – French horn
- Paul Langerman – trombone
- Lennart De Winter – trombone
- Thijs Dapper – oboe, oboe d'amore

Additional orchestra

- Jeroen Goossens – flute, piccolo, bassoon, clarinet, sampona, kaval
- Jack Pisters – sitar
- Igor Hobus – orchestral snare drum, orchestral toms, congas, djembe, darbuka, gong, suspended cymbal, tambourine

== Charts ==
The Holographic Principle became Epica's third album (after The Quantum Enigma and Requiem for the Indifferent) to chart on the Billboard 200 chart in the US, peaking at number 139. It also peaked at number 4 in Netherlands, making it together with Epica's 2014 The Quantum Enigma the band's highest charting album in their homeland.

Chart (2016)	Peak position
Australian Albums (ARIA)	46
Austrian Albums (Ö3 Austria)	21
Belgian Albums (Ultratop Flanders)	12
Belgian Albums (Ultratop Wallonia)	24
Dutch Albums (Album Top 100)	4
Finnish Albums (Suomen virallinen lista)	26
French Albums (SNEP)	26
German Albums (Offizielle Top 100)	9
Hungarian Albums (MAHASZ)	21
Italian Albums (FIMI)	26
Portuguese Albums (AFP)	25
Scottish Albums (OCC)	27
Spanish Albums (PROMUSICAE)	32
Swiss Albums (Schweizer Hitparade)	8
UK Albums (OCC)	46
US Billboard 200	139
