= The Solace System =

2017 EP by Epica

EP by Epica
- Released: 1 September 2017
- Recorded: 2016
- Studio: Sandlane Recording Facilities, Rijen, Netherlands
- Genre: Symphonic metal
- Length: 29:54
- Label: Nuclear Blast
- Producer: Joost van den Broek; Epica

Epica chronology
The Holographic Principle (2016)	The Solace System (2017)	Epica vs Attack on Titan Songs (2017)

Singles from The Solace System
- 1. "The Solace System" Released: 23 June 2017

The Solace System is the first EP by Dutch symphonic metal band Epica. It features tracks originally supposed to be featured on the band's seventh album The Holographic Principle, released the previous year.

== Track listing ==
No.	Title	Lyrics	Music	Length
1.	"The Solace System"	Simone Simons	Isaac Delahaye & Epica	4:39
2.	"Fight Your Demons"	Mark Jansen	Ariën van Weesenbeek & Epica	4:29
3.	"Architect of Light"	Simone Simons	Ariën van Weesenbeek & Epica	5:21
4.	"Wheel of Destiny"	Mark Jansen	Isaac Delahaye & Epica	5:51
5.	"Immortal Melancholy"	Simone Simons	Mark Jansen, Joost van den Broek & Epica	3:09
6.	"Decoded Poetry"	Simone Simons	Isaac Delahaye, Joost van den Broek & Epica	6:25
Total length:				29:54

== Personnel ==
Credits for The Solace System adapted from liner notes.

Epica

- Simone Simons – lead vocals, backing vocals
- Mark Jansen – rhythm guitar, growled vocals
- Isaac Delahaye – lead guitar, mandolin, balalaika, bouzouki, ukulele, orchestral toms, djembé, congas, bar chimes, tambourine, triangle
- Coen Janssen – keyboards, synthesizer, piano, glockenspiel, xylophone, tubular bells, orchestral toms, gran casa, djembé, congas, finger cymbals, tambourine, additional samples and effects
- Rob van der Loo – bass
- Ariën van Weesenbeek – drums, additional grunts, orchestral snare drum, orchestral toms, timbales, congas, bongos (solo), cymbal a deux

Additional personnel

- Marcela Bovio – backing vocals
- Linda Janssen-van Summeren – backing vocals

Choir – Kamerkoor PA'dam

- Maria van Nieukerken – choir director
- Martha Bosch, Ruth Becker, Silvia da Silva Martinho, Annemieke Klinkenberg-Nuijten, Alfrun Schmid, Dagmara Siuty, Guido Groenland, Joost van Velzen, Koert Braches, Matthijs Frankema, René Veen, Previn Moore, Annette Stallinga, Annette Vermeulen, Cécile Roovers, Natascha Morsink, Allard Veldman, Andreas Goetze, Angus van Grevenbroek, Jan Douwes

Production

- Joost van den Broek – recording, mixing, mastering, orchestral arrangements, samples
- Jacob Hansen – mixing, mastering
- Stefan Heilemann – artwork
- Jos Driessen – engineering, editing
- Gjalt Lucassen – Latin translation
- Jaap Toorenaar – Latin translation
- Ben Mathot – scoring
- Robin Assen – scoring

Epica Orchestra

- Sabine Poiesz – violin
- Ian de Jong – violin
- Ben Mathot – violin
- Floortje Beljon – violin
- Loes Dooren – violin
- Marieke de Bruijn – violin
- Vera van der Bie – violin
- Frank Goossens – viola
- Mark Mulder – viola
- Geneviève Verhage – celli
- Eilidh Martin – celli
- René van Munster – celli
- Henk Veldt – French horn
- Alex Thyssen – French horn
- Paul Langerman – trombone
- Lennart de Winter – trombone
- Marnix Coster – trumpet
- Jurgen van Nijnatten – trumpet
- Thijs Dapper – oboe

Additional orchestra

- Jeroen Goossens – flutes, bassoon
- Igor Hobus – congas, djembe, goblet drum, gong, cymbal, tambourine
- Jack Pisters – sitar
- Maarten de Peijper – snare drum

== Charts ==
Chart (2017)	Peak position
Hungarian Albums (MAHASZ)	37
German Albums (Offizielle Top 100)	60
