= Lesiëm =

German new age musical project

- Origin: Germany
- Genres: New age
- Years active: 1999–2005
- Labels: Epic/Sony; Monopol; Koch; Intentcity
- Past members: Sven Meisel; Alex Wende

Lesiëm was a German musical project created in 1999 by producers Sven Meisel and Alex Wende. Their music combined elements of rock, pop, electronic, new age, ambient, as well as Gregorian chant and other choral music. It was compared to Enigma, Era, Shinnobu, and Amethystium. They released three studio albums and several singles before going inactive in 2005.

== History ==
Lesiëm was created in Germany by producers Sven Meisel and Alex Wende in 1999 as an eclectic combination of Gregorian chants and choral music, combined with modern genres, especially rock, pop, and electronic music. The Latin lyrics were written by Thomas Pflanz and sung by the all-male Carl Maria von Weber choir on the first two albums and the Deutsche Oper Berlin on the third.

The project's first album, Mystic Spirit Voices, was released in January 2000 in Germany and 2002 in the United States, where it reached No. 10 on the Billboard New Age Albums chart.

Lesiëm's second album, Chapter 2, came out in 2001 in Germany and 2003 in the United States, under the title Illumination, ranking at No. 7 on the Billboard New Age albums chart. It included a collaboration with South African singer Lawrence Sihlabeni, on the track "Africa". Sihlabeni had also sung on "Indalo", from the first album.

Times, Lesiëm's third record (released as Auracle in the United States), came out in 2004. It included the single "Caritas", which featured the Scottish singer Maggie Reilly. In 2005, Lesiëm released the songs "Morgain" and "Morgause" for a new version of Times, both also collaborations with Reilly.

== Discography ==
=== Albums ===
- Mystic Spirit Voices (2000) (US, 2002)
- Chapter 2 (2001) (US: Illumination, 2003)
- Times (2003) (US: Auracle, 2004)
- Aeternum (2026)

=== Singles ===
- "Fundamentum" (2000)
- "Indalo" (2000)
- "Liberta" (2000)
- "Africa" (2000)
- "Navigator" (2001)
- "Caritas" (2002)

=== Audiobooks ===
- Der steinige Weg, Monopol Records, 21 October 2005

== See also ==
- E Nomine
- Gregorian
