= Dargaard =

Austrian neoclassical dark wave band

- Origin: Austria
- Genres: Neoclassical dark wave, dark ambient
- Years active: 1997–present
- Label: Napalm
- Members: Tharen; Elisabeth Toriser
- Website: dargaard.at/mainpage.htm

Dargaard is an Austrian neoclassical dark wave band formed in 1997. Typically in dark and somber moods, the music of Dargaard presents medieval and folk-like melodies, often orchestrated through the use of various instrument patches from a keyboard. The band has four releases at this time.

== Band history ==
Dargaard was founded by Alexander "Tharen" Opitz in 1997. Tharen had already played a prominent role in several underground bands by this time, including Abigor and Amestigon, both black metal bands and Dominion III, an industrial music act. Tharen was the keyboard player in Abigor, but Amestigon, Dominion III and Dargaard are entirely his projects. Dargaard was born out of Tharen's desire to move away from black metal and express himself through more ambient and classical music.

Also joining the band was Elisabeth Toriser as vocalist. Elisabeth was the vocalist in Dominion III and was also involved in the band Antichrisis; she supplied backing vocals for Abigor's 1995 album Nachthymnen (From the Twilight Kingdom). She claimed in an interview to have split with this band because it interrupted her studies, and she felt their musical conception was different. Tharen has also commented that Elisabeth is working on another project based around acoustic guitars, but as of writing this no recordings or releases have been made.

Dargaard, taken from the fantasy book series Dragonlance, is the name of a cursed stronghold that stands in everlasting darkness after a tragic failure of its owner. The name of the stronghold is in full Dargaard Keep and it belongs to the death knight Lord Soth - "Knight of the Black Rose".

== Music ==
With Tharen composing the music and Elisabeth writing the vocal melodies, the band recorded their debut album Eternity Rites in October 1998 at Hoernix Studios. It was released through Napalm Records, who Tharen was already involved with due to his previous bands. This is the reason the band released no demo as the record deal was already signed with Tharen. The release was highly acclaimed by fans of metal and dark wave alike. As one reviewer put it - "Dargaard's 'Eternity Rites' is a climactic fairytale full of medieval/folk themes beautifully composed and perfectly performed. Majestic, frequently aggressively dark, but more often melancholic atmosphere makes for a thought-provoking listening experience." The band would return to the studio in August to create their second album.

In Nomine Aeternitatis was the band's next record. Continuing the Dargaard formula, the band created another work of dark melody, the release was considered by fans to be a true milestone of innovate dark wave music. Released on 3 June 2000 through Napalm Records, it again received great praise. The band continued on their musical journey, releasing The Dissolution of Eternity in June 2001, and their latest work Rise and Fall in March 2004.

Tharen himself describes the music as "songs [that] radiate a kind of beauty, but on the other side we always tried to make our music dark and mighty, the same goes to the lyrics. It's about my very own realm, and this realm consists of dark forces, magic and mysticism and even darkness itself that has its own kind of beauty." Tharen names his influences as many, mainly from feelings gathered from reading. Terry Goodkind's Sword of Truth is a named influence along with the Mysterious Realms series of books. Tharen also said that his music wasn't directly influenced by any other dark wave bands. The lyrics, a mixture of ancient cultures, myths and mysticism and an important part in Dargaard style, are generally inspired from Tharen's "dreams and "visions" of other realms and dimensions".

== Band members ==
Current members

- Elisabeth Toriser – vocals (1997–present)
- Alexander "Tharen" Opitz – keyboards, vocals (1997–present)

== Discography ==
- Eternity Rites (1998)
- In Nomine Aeternitatis (2000)
- The Dissolution of Eternity (2001)
- Rise and Fall (2004)
