= Christian Brückner =

German voice actor

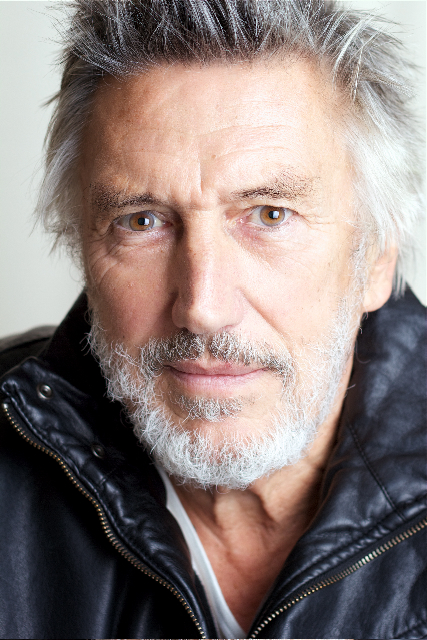
- Brückner in 2011
- Born: Waldenburg, Silesia
- Occupation: Voice actor
- Known for: German voice of Robert De Niro

Christian Brückner is a German voice actor and actor. He has provided German voice dubbing for such actors as Robert De Niro, Gary Oldman, Robert Redford, Martin Sheen, Harvey Keitel, Burt Reynolds, Dennis Hopper, Gérard Depardieu, Donald Sutherland, and Jon Voight. In 2009, he had a small German-speaking part in the Quentin Tarantino film Inglourious Basterds.

Brückner has also collaborated with the German trance/techno band E Nomine on a number of their albums.
