= Two Tragedy Poets (...and a Caravan of Weird Figures) =

Two Tragedy Poets (...And a Caravan of Weird Figures)

Studio album by Elvenking
- Released: 14 November 2008
- Genre: Folk rock; hard rock; acoustic folk
- Length: 43:09
- Label: AFM
- Producer: Damnagoras and Aydan

Elvenking chronology
| The Scythe (2007) | Two Tragedy Poets (...And a Caravan of Weird Figures) (2008) | Red Silent Tides (2010) |

Professional ratings
Review scores
| Source | Rating |
|---|---|
| AllMusic | 3.5/5 stars |
| Sputnikmusic | 4.0/5 stars |
| Metal Review | 5.1/10 stars |
| Metal Storm | 8.9/10 stars |

Two Tragedy Poets (...And a Caravan of Weird Figures) is the fifth studio album by Italian folk metal band Elvenking. It was released through AFM Records on 14 November 2008. The album is mostly acoustic; it includes acoustic versions of two older tracks, "The Winter Wake" and "The Wanderer", both from The Winter Wake. The Japanese edition also includes a remake of "Skywards", originally released on the album Heathenreel. Although Elvenking's website says otherwise, instead of "The Wanderer (acoustic version)" being a digipack bonus track, it's "My Little Moon".

The album was preceded by an online single, which included another acoustic version of the band's older song, "The Perpetual Knot".

== Track listing ==
All lyrics are written by Aydan and Damnagoras except where noted; all music is composed by Aydan and Damnagoras except where noted.

| No. | Title | Lyrics | Music | Length |
|---|---|---|---|---|
| 1. | "The Caravan of Weird Figures" | | | 1:16 |
| 2. | "Another Awful Hobs Tale" | | | 3:09 |
| 3. | "From Blood to Stone" | | | 4:11 |
| 4. | "Ask a Silly Question" | | | 3:30 |
| 5. | "She Lives at Dawn" | | | 1:24 |
| 6. | "The Winter Wake" (acoustic version) | | | 4:11 |
| 7. | "Heaven Is a Place on Earth" (Belinda Carlisle cover) | Rick Nowels; Ellen Shipley | Nowels; Shipley | 4:11 |
| 8. | "My Own Spider's Web" | | | 4:21 |
| 9. | "Not My Final Song" | | | 4:44 |
| 10. | "The Blackest of My Hearts" | | | 3:30 |
| 11. | "The Wanderer" (acoustic version) | | | 4:50 |
| 12. | "Miss Conception" | | | 3:49 |
| Total length: | | | | 43:09 |

Bonus tracks
| No. | Title | Length |
|---|---|---|
| 12. | "My Little Moon" (digipack bonus track) |
| 13. | "Skywards 2008" (Japanese bonus track) |
