= My Song for You =

My Song for You may refer to:

== Film ==
- My Song for You (film), a 1934 film, or its title song released as an EP in 1957

== Music ==
=== Albums ===
- My Song For You, a 1969 album by the Mercey Brothers, or its title track
- My Song For You, a 2009 album by Mai Fukui
- My Song for You, a 1974 album by Vicky Leandros

=== Songs ===
- "My Song for You", a 1982 song by Amii Ozaki
- "My Song For You", a 2005 song by Keith Martin from the album I'm Not Alone
- "My Song For You", a 2008 song by Amanda Sommerville from the album Windows
- "My Song for You" (Demi Lovato and Joe Jonas song), 2010
