= Amanda Somerville =

American singer-songwriter (born 1979)

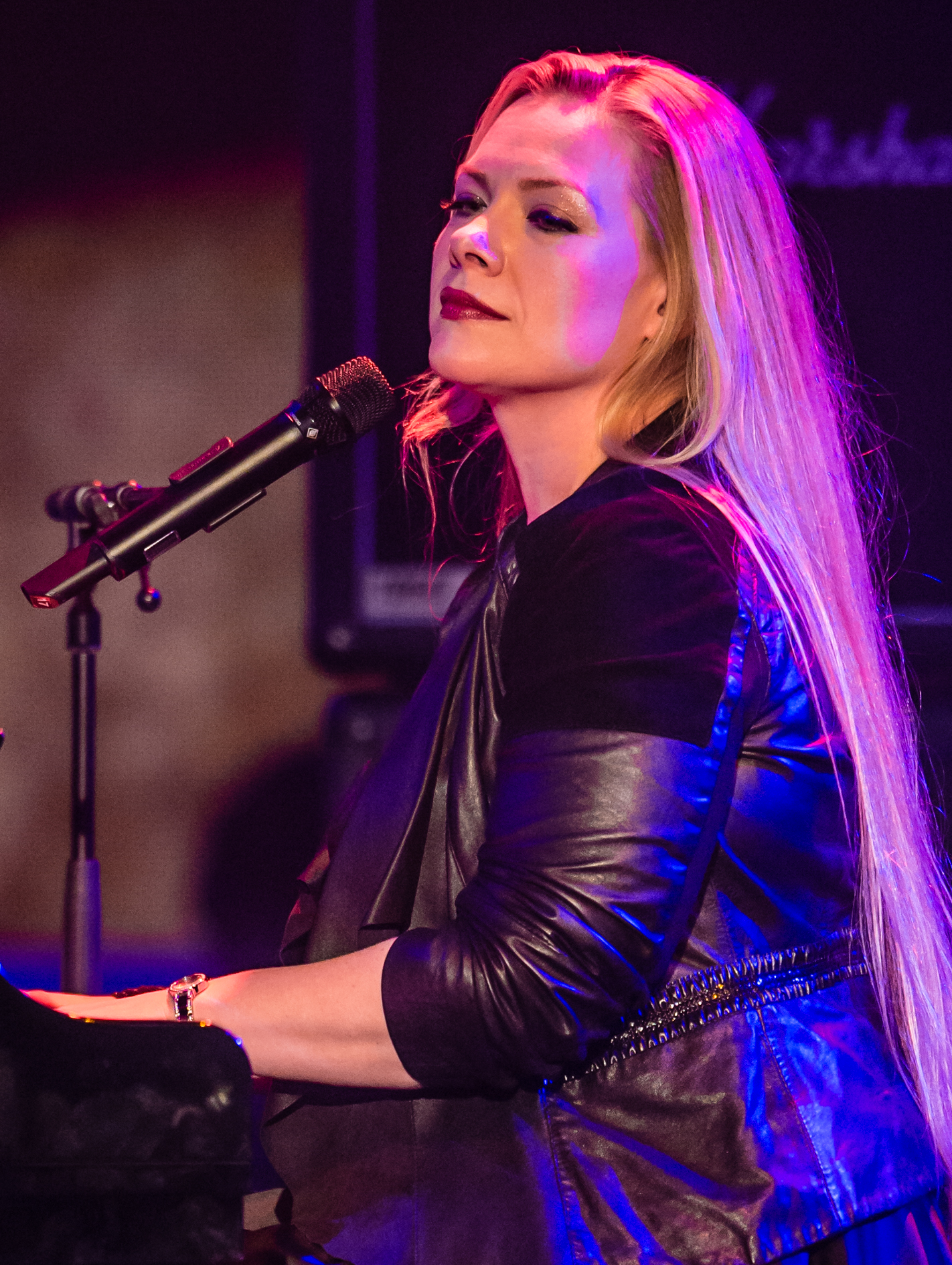
- Somerville performing with Avantasia in 2016

Background information
- Born: March 7, 1979 (age 47)
- Genres: Pop rock; heavy metal; hard rock; symphonic rock; progressive rock; symphonic metal
- Occupation: Singer-songwriter
- Instruments: Vocals, piano
- Years active: 1997–present

Amanda Somerville (born March 7, 1979) is an American singer-songwriter and vocal coach who resides in Wolfsburg, Germany. She is known primarily for her work with many European symphonic metal bands.

== Biography ==
=== Personal life ===
Somerville was raised in Flushing, Michigan. She attended Flushing Senior High School, original graduating class of 1997, however graduating a full year early in 1996 and winning a scholarship for graduating with high honors to the University of Michigan–Flint, where she majored in psychology. Somerville moved to Wolfsburg, Germany in 1999, where she resided for several years, working mainly in Germany and the Netherlands.

On August 19, 2013, she announced that she was engaged to be married to After Forever's former guitarist Sander Gommans, and the pair were married on July 26, 2014.

On January 8, 2015, she announced that she and Gommans were expecting their first child.

On July 17, 2015, their daughter, Lana Elise Gommans, was born.

In 2018, their identical twin daughters Anya and Juliet were born.

On September 19, 2026, it was announced that Somerville was diagnosed with "a malignant and aggressive brain tumor" resulting in diffuse midline glioma (DMG), a brain tumor that is not operable.

== Music career ==
Somerville has written and recorded with bands such as After Forever, Edguy, Kamelot, Epica, Avantasia, and Docker's Guild, and has produced two solo albums. Her solo releases to date are primarily soft and elegant pop rock with some hard rock, folk and soul music influences. Somerville herself wrote and contributed instrumentally to all of the songs on her solo albums, with only one exception, "Out" from the album Windows (written by Sascha Paeth).

She collaborated with several of these metal bands alongside producers Sascha Paeth and Michael Rodenberg, which led her to collaborate with multi-instrumentalist Robert Hunecke-Rizzo, co-writing the rock opera Aina. Later she made a similar collaboration with guitarist Sander Gommans (After Forever), providing vocals and lyrical concept for the project HDK. In 2008, she toured America with Dutch symphonic metal band Epica, while regular vocalist Simone Simons recovered from a staph infection.

=== Kiske/Somerville ===
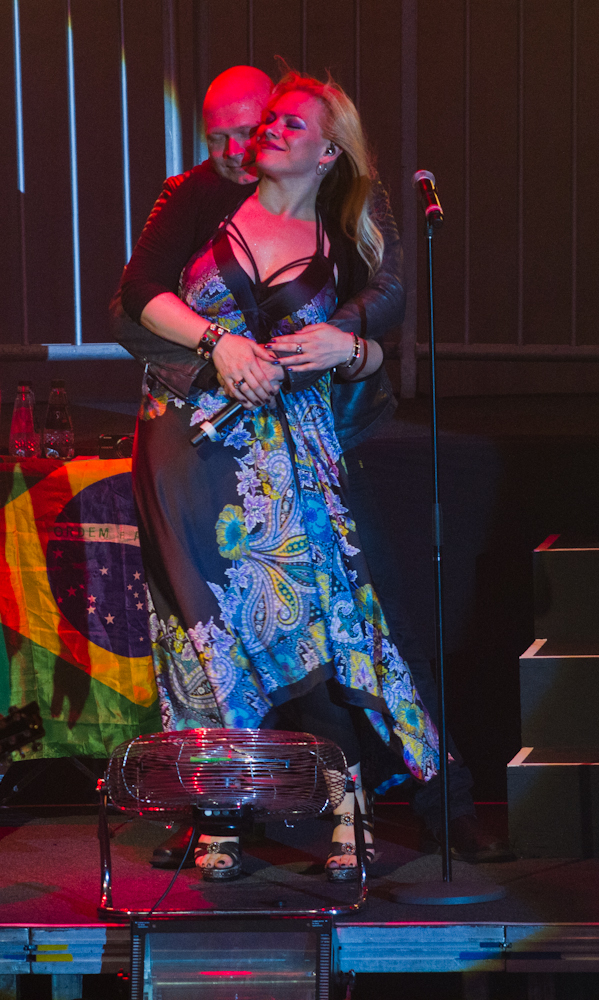
Somerville performing with Michael Kiske in 2013

In 2010, she collaborated with Michael Kiske (Helloween singer) on a musical project entitled Kiske/Somerville. The band is a melodic metal act put together by Frontiers Records, a similar project as Allen/Lande. Songwriting and producing was done by Primal Fear bassist Mat Sinner with collaboration by guitarist Magnus Karlsson (Allen/Lande, also from Primal Fear), Sander Gommans, Jimmy Kresic and Somerville herself. Their first single, "Silence", was released on August 20. Their self-titled album was released on 24 September 2010 by Frontiers Records, after the single accompanied by a music video for "Silence". A music video was also made for the song "If I Had One Wish." Somerville contributed creatively to the album by writing three of its songs: "A Thousand Suns," "Arise" and "Set Afire," all co-written with Sander Gommans.

=== Avantasia ===
Somerville was also one of the live guest vocalists for Tobias Sammet's metal opera Avantasia world tours in 2008, 2010, 2013 and 2016. Her role onstage included singing backing vocals during the whole setlist and performing lead vocals for the songs "Farewell," "The Wicked Symphony," "Lost in Space" and "Sign of the Cross." She parted ways with Avantasia in 2019, citing personal reasons.

=== Trillium ===
In 2011, Somerville finally released her first heavy metal-oriented project, called Trillium, the album entitled Alloy, with the record company Frontiers Records. The project has contributions by Sascha Paeth, Michael Rodenberg, Sander Gommans and a guest appearance of Jørn Lande on a duet vocal track with Somerville.

==== Trillium live band members ====
- Amanda Somerville - vocals (2011–present)
- Paul Owsinski - guitar (2011–present)
- Marc Burnash - bass, vocals (2011–present)
- Simon Oberender (†) - keyboard (2011–2012)
- Philip Krause - drums (2011–2012)
- Tom Pluijmaekers - drums (2013)

In 2018, the name of the project was updated to "Amanda Somerville's Trillium" and the 2nd album was released, entitled Tectonic. A video was filmed and released for the song "Time To Shine" and lyric videos were released for the tracks "Shards" and "Full Speed Ahead."

=== Docker's Guild ===
Somerville was featured on Douglas R. Docker's space metal opera Docker's Guild. In 2012, she appeared on the song "Black Swan", a duet with Göran Edman on the debut album The Mystic Technocracy - Season 1: The Age of Ignorance. In 2016, she was featured again in the "Flash Gordon Suite", from Queen's soundtrack of the same name, on the album The Heisenberg Diaries - Book A: Sounds of Future past.

=== New HDK, Kiske/Somerville albums and beyond ===
In 2014, a new HDK album called Serenades of the Netherworld was released, featuring Somerville and Geert Kroes on vocals, and once again produced and composed by Sander Gommans. This was also the year Somerville and Gommans were married. Somerville was also part of a metal opera project from the Middle East, produced by Lebanese guitarist Amadeus Awad, with an album called The Book of Gates. She played the part of the Queen of the Nile.

In 2015, the second Kiske/Somerville album, entitled City of Heroes, was announced and released, once again featuring bassist Mat Sinner as producer and in a songwriting partnership with guitarist Magnus Karlsson, who was also in charge of the keyboards, while Veronika Lukesova was the drummer. The song "Breaking Neptune" was written by Somerville and Gommans, and two music videos were filmed for the songs "City of Heroes" and "Walk on Water".

=== Exit Eden ===
In 2017, another new project was announced. Called Exit Eden, it features Somerville and three other female singers from the rock/metal scene: Clémentine Delauney (Visions of Atlantis, Serenity, Melted Space, Kai Hansen & Friends), Marina La Torraca (who replaced Somerville in a few festival shows of the Avantasia 2016 world tour) and newcomer Anna Brunner. The band was conceived with the plan "to show the world that almost every classic song can be transformed into a solid Metal-Rock song", a concept similar to Finland's Northern Kings. The tracklist of their debut album, Rhapsodies In Black, features some pop hits such as Madonna's "Frozen", Adele's "Skyfall" and Lady Gaga's "Paparazzi". The album was released on August 4, 2017 via Napalm Records worldwide and via Starwatch in Germany, Switzerland and Austria. Simone Simons (Epica) appears on two tracks of the album.

== Discography ==
=== Solo ===
- In the Beginning There Was... (2000)
- Blue Nothing (EP, 2000)
- Never Alone (EP, 2003)
- Windows (2008)
- Conformity Challenged (TBA)

=== Aina ===
- Days of Rising Doom (2003)

=== HDK ===
- System Overload (2008)
- Serenades of the Netherworld (2014)

=== Kiske/Somerville ===
- Kiske/Somerville (2010)
- City of Heroes (2015)

=== Trillium ===
- Alloy (2011)
- Tectonic (2018)

=== Exit Eden ===
- Rhapsodies in Black (2017)

== Collaborations ==
Somerville's contributions include vocals, coaching, production, engineering and choir conductor:

=== Featured vocals ===
Year	Song(s)	Artist	Album
2007	"Lost in Space" & "The Story Ain't Over"	Avantasia	Lost in Space (Part I)
2007	"Lost in Space" & "Lost in Space (Alive at Gatestudio)"	Avantasia	Lost in Space (Part II)
2007	"Ghost Opera", "Love You to Death", "Mourning Star" & "Season's End"	Kamelot	Ghost Opera
2008	"What Kind of Love" & "Lost in Space"	Avantasia	The Scarecrow
2010	"Femme Fatale" & "Black Rose, Pt.II"	Sebastien	Tears of White Roses
2010	"The Zodiac"	Kamelot	Poetry for the Poisoned
2011	"Changing Fate"	Serenity	Death & Legacy
2011	"Farewell" & "Sign of the Cross/The Seven Angels (Medley) / All songs (backing vocals)"	Avantasia	The Flying Opera
2011	"Into Shadow"	DesDemon	Through the Gates
2011	"Symphony of Aggression"	MaYaN	Quarterpast
2011	"The Hunger", "Secrets", "Smoke and Mirrors" & "The Infinite Overture Pt. I"	Infinity Overture	The Infinite Overture Pt. I
2011	"Blood Red Rose"	The Boyscout	Blood Red Rose – A Rock Fantasy
2012	"To Crawl or to Fly" & "Whispers Inside You"	Soulspell Metal Opera	Hollow's Gathering
2012	"Send My Message Home"	PelleK	Bag of Tricks
2012	"Black Swans"	Docker's Guild	The Mystic Technocracy - Season 1: The Age of Ignorance
2013	"Time Bomb"	Siber Sky	Time Bomb
2013	"Cold Winter"	Wolfpakk	Cry Wolf
2014	All songs (as The Queen of the Nile)	Amadeus Awad's EON	The Book of Gates
2014	"King of the Elves"	Elvenking	Pagan Manifesto
2014	"End Of All Days"	Mob Rules	Timekeeper: 20th Anniversary Box
2015	"What Are You Waiting For"	Aeverium	Breakout
2016	All songs	Magni Animi Viri	Heroes Temporis (World Edition)
2016	"Codex Atlanticus" & "The Perfect Woman"	Serenity	Codex Atlanticus
2016	"Flash Gordon Suite"	Docker's Guild	The Heisenberg Diaries - Book A: Sounds of Future Past
2016	All songs (backing vocals)	Avantasia	Ghostlights (The Digibook edition bonus disc – Avantasia Live)
2020	"Daniel's funeral", "Henry's plot", "Message from beyond", "She's innocent", "Lavinia's confession" & "Your story is over!" (character Lavinia)	Ayreon	Transitus
2020	"Tears of the Earth"	Crimson Cry	Playing Gods
2022	"Urbs Aeterna", "Pornocracy (Saeculum Obscurum)" & "The Head" (from the "into the Dahr Cages" suite, character The Narrator)	Docker's Guild	The Mystic Technocracy - Season 2: The Age of Entropy
2023	"Tears of Blood"	Angra	Cycles of Pain

=== Coaching, production, engineering and choir conductor ===
- Aeverium – The Harvest EP (2014), Break Out (2015), Time (2017), The Secret Door (2024); vocal coach, producer, backing vocals, guest vocals
- After Forever – Invisible Circles (2004), Remagine (2005), After Forever (2007); vocal coach, backing/choir vocals, producer
- Andre Matos – Time to Be Free (2007), Mentalize (2009); choir/backing vocals and lyrical editor
- Asrai – Touch in the Dark (2004): lyrical editor
- Ebony Ark – Decoder 2.0 (2007); backing vocals, vocal coach
- Edguy – Hellfire Club (2004), Rocket Ride (2006); backing vocals, lyrical editor
- Epica – The Phantom Agony (2003), We Will Take You with Us (2004), Consign to Oblivion (2005), The Road to Paradiso (2006), The Divine Conspiracy (2007), live session singer for USA Canada tour (2008), Design Your Universe (2009); vocal coach, backing/choir vocals, co-writer, producer, Requiem for the Indifferent (2012)
- Kambrium - Dark Reveries (2013); vocalist on the song "Lake Gloom"
- Kamelot – The Black Halo (2005), Ghost Opera (2007), Poetry For The Poisoned (2010), Silverthorn (2012); choir / backing vocals and story author based on Silverthorn's concept
- Luca Turilli – Prophet of the Last Eclipse (2002); choir vocals
- Mob Rules – Ethnolution A.D. (2002); choir vocals
- Shaman – Ritual (2002), Reason (2005); backing vocals, lyrical editor
- Virgo – Virgo (2001); vocalist, lyrical editor
- Xandria - Sacrificium (2014); spoken words on the song "Betrayer"

== Notes ==
- "Signierstunde von Amanda Somerville. Ball mit allen Unterschriften der VfL-Profis zu gewinnen. Amanda Somerville: "Ich trete gern in den Dialog mit den Menschen."". VfL Wolfsburg-Presseservice (in German). 2003-12-12. Archived from the original on 2009-03-02.
