= Era (Elvenking album) =

Studio album by Elvenking
- Released: 14 September 2012
- Genres: Folk metal; power metal
- Length: 45:57
- Label: AFM Records
- Producers: Nino Laurenne, Aydan

Elvenking chronology
| Red Silent Tides (2010) | Era (2012) | The Pagan Manifesto (2014) |

Era is the seventh studio album by Italian folk metal band Elvenking. The album continues the band's traditional sound of folk metal and power metal with the folk elements shining more than in their heavier previous albums such as The Scythe and Red Silent Tides. Guest appearances on vocals by Jon Oliva (Savatage, Trans-Siberian Orchestra, Jon Oliva's Pain) and Netta Dahlberg as well as a guitar solo performed by Teemu Mäntysaari of Wintersun can be heard on the album. Prior to the album's release, Damna and Aydan did a sit down via YouTube going through the album track-by-track describing to fans where each song is coming from and what went into writing and recording the songs.

== Track listing ==
| No. | Title | Length |
|---|---|---|
| 1. | "The Loser" | 4:58 |
| 2. | "I Am the Monster" (featuring Jon Oliva) | 5:12 |
| 3. | "Midnight Skies, Winter Sighs" | 4:33 |
| 4. | "A Song for the People" (featuring Netta Dahlberg) | 1:46 |
| 5. | "We, Animals" | 4:07 |
| 6. | "Through Wolf's Eyes" | 3:19 |
| 7. | "Walking Dead" (featuring Teemu Mäntysaari) | 3:44 |
| 8. | "Forget-Me-Not" (featuring Jon Oliva and Netta Dahlberg) | 5:39 |
| 9. | "Poor Little Baroness" | 5:19 |
| 10. | "The Time of Your Life" | 4:20 |
| 11. | "Chronicle of a Frozen Era" | 6:40 |
| 12. | "Ophale" | 2:44 |
| Total length: | | 45:57 |

Digipack bonus tracks
| No. | Title | Length |
|---|---|---|
| 13. | "Grey Inside" | 4:16 |
| 14. | "Khanjar" (instrumental) | 4:26 |
| 15. | "I Am the Monster" (only Damnagoras's vocals) | 5:13 |

== Personnel ==
- Damnagoras – vocals
- Aydan – guitars
- Rafahel – guitars
- Jakob – bass
- Symohn – drums
- Lethien – violin
