= Serenades of the Netherworld =

Studio album by HDK
- Released: March 2014
- Studio: The Rock Station Studios, Reuver, Netherlands
- Genre: Heavy metal, death metal, thrash metal, melodic death metal
- Length: 50:51
- Label: Revolutionary Records
- Producer: Sander Gommans, Amanda Somerville

HDK chronology
| System Overload (2009) | Serenades of the Netherworld (2014) |

Serenades of the Netherworld is the second album released by Dutch guitarist Sander Gommans's project HDK (Hate, Death, Kill). "Revelation" and "Return from Tomorrow" were released as single tracks, while the entire album itself entered stores on 1 September 2014.

== Track listing ==
All tracks are written by Amanda Somerville, Sander Gommans & Geert Kroes, except where noted

| No. | Title | Length |
|---|---|---|
| 1. | "Revelation" | 4:52 |
| 2. | "Electric Soul" | 6:33 |
| 3. | "Mortal Zombie" | 3:50 |
| 4. | "Serenade of the Netherworld" | 4:16 |
| 5. | "Return from Tomorrow" | 6:04 |
| 6. | "Let Life Be Done" | 3:59 |
| 7. | "Eternal Journey" | 4:26 |
| 8. | "Witness" (Somerville, Gommans, Kroes, Erik van Ittersum) | 4:27 |
| 9. | "Book of Lies" (Somerville, Gommans, Kroes, van Ittersum) | 4:50 |
| 10. | "Omega" | 7:38 |

== Personnel ==
HDK

- Sander Gommans (ex–After Forever, Trillium, Kiske/Somerville) – guitars, bass, recording, producing
- Amanda Somerville (Trillium, Avantasia, Kiske/Somerville) – female vocals
- Geert Kroes (Dead Man's Curse, BlindSight) – clean male vocals, growls, cover artwork
- Koen Herfst (Bagga Bownz, I Chaos, Dew–Scented, Armin van Buuren) – drums
- Uri Dijk (Textures) – keyboards

Guests musicians

- Mark Burnash – bass on tracks 2–4
- Paul Owsinski – lead guitar on track 8
- Stephen Pursey – guitar solos on track 2
- Erik van Ittersum (Insomnia, Ethereal) – keyboards on tracks 8 and 9

Production

- Joost van den Broek (Sun Caged, ex–After Forever) – mixing
- Jos Driessen – mastering
