= The Pagan Manifesto =

Studio album by Elvenking
- Released: May 9, 2014
- Genres: Folk metal; power metal
- Length: 64:03
- Label: AFM Records
- Producer: Aydan

Elvenking chronology
Era (2012)	The Pagan Manifesto (2014)	Secrets of the Magick Grimoire (2017)

Professional ratings
Review scores
Source	Rating
Dangerdog	3.5/5
Dead Rhetoric	8.5/10
Hard Rock Haven	8.75/10
Metal Covenant	7/10
Metal Reviews	85/100
Metal Storm	8/10
Metal Temple	10/10
My Global Mind	10/10

The Pagan Manifesto is the eighth studio album by Italian folk metal band Elvenking.

== Track listing ==
No.	Title	Length
1.	"The Manifesto"	1:32
2.	"King of the Elves"	12:55
3.	"Elvenlegions"	3:52
4.	"The Druid Ritual of Oak"	4:03
5.	"Moonbeam Stone Circle"	5:35
6.	"The Solitaire"	4:37
7.	"Towards the Shores"	4:09
8.	"Pagan Revolution"	3:39
9.	"Grandier's Funeral Pyre"	4:34
10.	"Twilight of Magic"	5:37
11.	"Black Roses for the Wicked One"	4:48
12.	"Witches Gather"	8:42
Total length:		64:03

Japanese edition bonus tracks
No.	Title	Length
13.	"Amethyst"	2:17
14.	"Cyfarwydd"	3:12
15.	"Kanjhar"	4:23
16.	"Rouse Your Dream" (Little Black Dress version)	4:33
Total length:		78:28

== Personnel ==
- Damnagoras – vocals
- Aydan – guitars
- Rafahel – guitars
- Jakob – bass
- Symohn – drums
- Lethien – violin

Additional musicians

- Amanda Somerville (Kiske/Somerville) – guest vocals on "King of the Elves"
- Jarpen – guest vocals on "Witches Gather"
- Maurizio (Folkstone) – bagpipes, tin and low whistles
- Whisperwind (Isabella Tuni – guest vocals on "Witches Gather"
