= City of Heroes (album) =

Studio album by Kiske/Somerville
- Released: 17 April 2015
- Genres: Heavy metal; hard rock; symphonic metal; power metal
- Length: 55:28
- Label: Frontiers
- Producers: Mat Sinner; Jacob Hansen

Kiske/Somerville chronology
Kiske/Somerville (2010)	City of Heroes (2015)

City of Heroes is the second studio album by the melodic rock / heavy metal duet project Kiske/Somerville. The album features the collaboration between vocalist Michael Kiske (Helloween, Unisonic, Place Vendome) and American singer Amanda Somerville (Aina, HDK, Trillium). It was released on 17 April 2015 in Europe and on 21 April 2015 in North America.

The album features Mat Sinner (Primal Fear, Sinner) and Magnus Karlsson (Primal Fear) handling most of the songwriting, with one contribution from Sander Gommans (ex-After Forever) and Amanda Somerville. Veronika Lukesova is in charge of the drumming and Mat Sinner handle the production. Jacob Hansen mixed and mastered the album. City of Heroes charted at No. 41 in the official German album charts.

Two music videos were filmed for the songs "City Of Heroes" and "Walk On Water" in Nuremberg, Germany. Joining Kiske and Somerville for the shoot were bassist and composer Mat Sinner, guitarist, keyboardist and composer Magnus Karlsson and drummer Veronika Lukesova. The clips were directed by Martin Mueller.

== Track listing ==
All tracks are written by Mat Sinner and Magnus Karlsson, except "Breaking Neptune" by Amanda Somerville and Sander Gommans.

Standard, Deluxe and Vinyl Edition
No.	Title	Length
1.	"City of Heroes"	4:02
2.	"Walk on Water"	4:16
3.	"Rising Up"	4:44
4.	"Salvation"	5:59
5.	"Lights Out"	4:50
6.	"Breaking Neptune"	4:09
7.	"Ocean of Tears"	4:28
8.	"Open Your Eyes"	4:17
9.	"Last Goodbye"	3:47
10.	"After the Night Is Over"	4:58
11.	"Run with a Dream"	4:39
12.	"Right Now"	5:18
Total length:		60:25

Japanese edition bonus track
No.	Title	Length
13.	"Salvation" (Special Orchestra Mix)	4:58

=== DVD ===
- City of Heroes (official music video)
- Walk on Water (official music video)
- Making of "City of Heroes" (documentary)

== Musicians ==
- Michael Kiske – male lead and backing vocals
- Amanda Somerville – female lead and backing vocals
- Magnus Karlsson – guitars, keyboards
- Mat Sinner – bass, backing vocals
- Veronika Lukesova – drums

== Videoclips ==
- City of Heroes on YouTube (2015)
- Walk on Water on YouTube (2015)
