= HDK =

HDK may refer to:

- HDK (band), Dutch death metal band
- H. D. Kumaraswamy (born 1959), Indian politician
- School of Design and Crafts, (Swedish: Högskolan för design och konsthantverk), in Gothenburg, Sweden
- Peoples' Democratic Congress, political movement in Turkey
