= Kiske/Somerville (album) =

Studio album by Kiske/Somerville
- Released: 24 September 2010
- Studios: Stuntguitar Studios, Höör, Sweden; Audiospezialist Studios, Bittenfeld; Indiscreet Studios, Stuttgart; Level 10, Liquid Home Studio, Germany; HDK Studios, Reuver, Netherlands
- Genres: Hard rock, Heavy metal
- Length: 53:20
- Label: Frontiers
- Producer: Mat Sinner

Kiske/Somerville chronology
Kiske/Somerville (2010)	City of Heroes (2015)

Professional ratings
Review scores
Source	Rating
Metal Hammer (GER)	(5/7)
Lords of Metal	(87/100)
Revelationz Magazine	(8/10)

Kiske/Somerville is the debut album of the melodic rock / heavy metal duet project Kiske/Somerville. The album features the collaboration of vocalist Michael Kiske (ex-Helloween, Unisonic, Place Vendome) with American singer Amanda Somerville (Aina, HDK, Trillium). The album was released on 24 September 2010 with cover art credited to Stanis W. Decker.

The album sees Mat Sinner (Primal Fear, Sinner) and Magnus Karlsson (Starbreaker, Primal Fear) handling most of the songwriting, with more contributions from the former After Forever guitarist Sander Gommans and Amanda Somerville herself. Mat Sinner oversaw the production and mixing of the songs at various recording studios in Europe.

Two videoclips were filmed for the songs "Silence" on YouTube and "If I Had a Wish" on YouTube in Nuremberg, Germany. Joining Kiske and Somerville for the shoot were bassist and main composer Mat Sinner, guitarist Sander Gommans, drummer Ramy Ali and keyboardist Jimmy Kresic (Voodoo Circle). The clips were directed by Martin Mueller of RCN TV.

The digital only release of the single, "Silence", on 20 August 2010, preceded the release of the full-length CD.

The bonus DVD includes videoclips of "Silence" and "If I Had a Wish", plus a 'Making of' documentary.

== Track listing ==
Standard Edition
No.	Title	Writer(s)	Length
1.	"Nothing Left to Say"	Mat Sinner, Magnus Karlsson	4:37
2.	"Silence"	Sinner, Karlsson	6:21
3.	"If I Had a Wish"	Sinner, Karlsson	4:20
4.	"Arise"	Sander Gommans, Amanda Somerville	3:14
5.	"End of the Road"	Sinner, Jimmy Kresic	5:10
6.	"Don't Walk Away"	Sinner, Karlsson	4:31
7.	"A Thousand Suns"	Gommans, Somerville	3:58
8.	"Rain"	Sinner, Karlsson	3:47
9.	"One Night Burning"	Sinner, Karlsson	4:04
10.	"Devil in Her Heart"	Sinner, Kresic	4:25
11.	"Second Chance"	Sinner, Karlsson	4:55

Italian, Mexican, Argentinian, Russian, European, Taiwanese and Brazilian Edition
No.	Title	Writer(s)	Length
12.	"Set a Fire" (bonus track)	Gommans, Somerville	3:58

Japanese Edition
No.	Title	Writer(s)	Length
12.	"One Night Burning" (acoustic version)	Sinner, Karlsson	3:24

DVD
No.	Title	Length
1.	"Silence" (video clip)	4:02
2.	"If I Had a Wish" (video clip)	4:25
3.	"Making Of" (documentary)	9:34

== Credits ==
Musicians

- Michael Kiske - vocals
- Amanda Somerville - vocals
- Magnus Karlsson - lead and rhythm guitar, keyboards, additional production
- Sander Gommans - lead guitar
- Jimmy Kresic - keyboards
- Mat Sinner - bass, backing vocals, producer
- Martin Schmidt - drums
- Ramy Ali - drums
- Recorded at Stuntguitar Studios, Audiospezialist Studios, Level 10, Liquid Home Studio and HDK Studios
- Achim Kohler - mixing and mastering at Indiscreet Studios.
- Serafino Perugino - executive producer
- Martin Mueller - videoclip director

== Videoclips ==
- Silence on YouTube (2010)
- If I Had a Wish on YouTube (2010)

== Charts ==
Chart (2010)	Peak position
Czech Republic Albums Chart	47
