= Red Silent Tides =

Studio album by Elvenking
- Released: September 17, 2010
- Recorded: Piranha Studio, Karsdolf, Germany
- Genre: Power metal; folk metal
- Length: 49:59
- Label: AFM
- Producer: Dennis Ward

Elvenking chronology
Two Tragedy Poets (...And a Caravan of Weird Figures) (2008)	Red Silent Tides (2010)	Era (2012)

Singles from Red Silent Tides
- 1. "The Cabal" Released: 6 September 2010; 2. "Your Heroes Are Dead" Released: 14 January 2011

Professional ratings
Review scores
Source	Rating
AllMusic	3.5/5 stars
metal.de	7/10

Red Silent Tides is the sixth studio album by Italian folk metal band Elvenking. It was released on 17 September 2010 through AFM Records in both standard and deluxe editions. The deluxe edition included a second disc which contained the band's first demo album To Oak Woods Bestowed as a bonus disc.

The album features Raffaello "Rafahel" Indri on guitars alongside Aydan. It does not feature Elyghen on violins due to his trip out of Italy; he was replaced by session player Fabio "Lethien" Polo for the remainder until Elyghen's return.

Two singles from the album were released: "The Cabal" and "Your Heroes Are Dead".

== Reception ==
Eduardo Rivadavia of AllMusic called Red Silent Tides "an extremely well-crafted collection of melodic power metal with prog/folk/gothic benefits." Metal.de gave it a score of 7/10, saying it was an improvement over the band's previous releases.

David E. Gehlke of Dead Rhetoric gave the album a mostly positive review, but criticized the band's "untapped potential". Trevor Portz of Hard Rock Haven called it "well-written, fun heavy metal."

== Track listing ==
No.	Title	Length
1.	"Dawnmelting"	4:09
2.	"The Last Hour"	4:38
3.	"Silence de Mort"	4:27
4.	"The Cabal"	4:20
5.	"Runereader"	5:23
6.	"Possession"	4:07
7.	"Your Heroes Are Dead"	3:54
8.	"Those Days"	4:06
9.	"This Nightmare Will Never End"	4:46
10.	"What's Left of Me"	4:39
11.	"The Play of the Leaves"	5:30

Japanese bonus tracks
No.	Title	Length
12.	"Jigsaw Puzzle (2010)"	3:47
13.	"Another Awful Hobs Tale"	3:11
14.	"From Blood to Stone"	4:11
15.	"Heaven Is a Place on Earth" (Belinda Carlisle cover)	4:01

Digipak special edition
No.	Title	Length
1.	"To Oak Woods Bestowed"	1:33
2.	"White Willow"	6:23
3.	"Banquet of Bards"	4:51
4.	"Oakenshield"	6:36
5.	"Under the Tree of Us'dum"	6:41

== Personnel ==
- Damnagoras – vocals
- Aydan – guitars
- Rafahel – guitars
- Gorlan – bass
- Zender – drums
- Lethien – violin
