= Reader of the Runes =

- Reader of the Runes - Divination album cover

Studio album by Elvenking
- Released: 30 August 2019 (Divination); 28 April 2023 (Rapture); 11 April 2025 (Luna)
- Genres: Pagan metal, folk metal, heavy metal, power metal
- Length: 52:20 (Divination); 54:45 (Rapture); 54:50 (Luna)
- Labels: AFM Records (Divination and Rapture); Reaper Entertainment (Luna)
- Producers: Aydan; Damna

Elvenking chronology
| Secrets of the Magick Grimoire (2017) | Reader of the Runes (2019) | Rites of Disclosure (EP) (2026) |

Singles from Reader of the Runes - Luna
- 1. "Throes of Atonement" Released: 29 November 2024; 2. "Luna" Released: 11 January 2025; 3. "Gone Epoch" Released: 2 March 2025

Professional ratings
Review scores
| Source | Rating |
|---|---|
| Metal Reviews | 80/100 (Divination) |
| Metal Storm | 8.5/10 (Rapture); 7.5/10 (Luna) |
| Metal Temple | 10/10 (Divination); 9/10 (Rapture); 8/10 (Luna) |
| My Global Mind | 10/10 (Divination); 9/10 (Rapture); 9/10 (Luna) |
| Sonic Perspectives | 8.8/10 (Divination); 8.5/10 (Rapture); 9/10 (Luna) |

Reader of the Runes is a trilogy of studio albums by Italian folk/power metal band Elvenking, consisting of the band's tenth, eleventh, and twelfth albums. The albums, subtitled Divination, Rapture, and Luna, were released on 30 August 2019, 28 April 2023, and 11 April 2025, respectively. Divination and Rapture were released via AFM Records, while Luna was released via Reaper Entertainment.

The Reader of the Runes albums mark the band's first concept albums, and vocalist Damna has stated his fondness over concept albums by bands such as King Diamond. Damna was diagonosed with Crohn's disease and had to undergo surgery, which postponed their Divination tour, originally scheduled for April 2020, to November and December of that year.

== Track listing ==
Reader of the Runes - Divination track listing
| No. | Title | Length |
|---|---|---|
| 1. | "Perthro" | 1:23 |
| 2. | "Heathen Divine" | 4:57 |
| 3. | "Divination" | 3:10 |
| 4. | "Silverseal" | 3:35 |
| 5. | "The Misfortune of Virtue" | 5:16 |
| 6. | "Eternal Eleanor" | 4:06 |
| 7. | "Diamonds in the Night" | 1:21 |
| 8. | "Under the Sign of a Black Star" | 4:13 |
| 9. | "Malefica Doctrine" | 4:58 |
| 10. | "Sic Semper Tyrannis" | 3:58 |
| 11. | "Warden of the Bane" | 4:40 |
| 12. | "Reader of the Runes - Book I" | 10:43 |
| Total length: | | 52:20 |

Reader of the Runes - Rapture track listing
| No. | Title | Length |
|---|---|---|
| 1. | "Rapture" | 6:23 |
| 2. | "The Hanging Tree" | 4:27 |
| 3. | "Bride of Night" | 3:50 |
| 4. | "Herdchant" | 5:16 |
| 5. | "The Cursed Cavalier" | 3:51 |
| 6. | "To the North" | 5:38 |
| 7. | "Covenant" | 4:49 |
| 8. | "Red Mist" | 5:07 |
| 9. | "Incantations" | 5:38 |
| 10. | "An Autumn Reverie" | 4:11 |
| 11. | "The Repentant" | 5:35 |
| Total length: | | 54:45 |

Reader of the Runes - Luna track listing
| No. | Title | Length |
|---|---|---|
| 1. | "Season of the Owl" | 5:23 |
| 2. | "Luna" | 3:07 |
| 3. | "Gone Epoch" | 4:57 |
| 4. | "Stormcarrier" | 4:51 |
| 5. | "Starbath" | 4:38 |
| 6. | "On These Haunted Shores" | 5:04 |
| 7. | "The Ghosting" | 4:32 |
| 8. | "Throes of Atonement" | 5:08 |
| 9. | "The Weeping" | 6:11 |
| 10. | "Reader of the Runes - Book II" | 10:59 |
| Total length: | | 54:50 |

== Personnel ==
- Damnagoras - Vocals
- Aydan - Guitars
- Rafahel - Guitars (Divination)
- HeadMatt - Guitars (Rapture and Luna)
- Jakob - Bass
- Lethien - Violin
- Lancs - Drums (Divination)
- Symohn - Drums (Rapture and Luna)
