= System Overload (album) =

Studio album by HDK
- Released: 23 February 2009
- Studio: Excess Studio, Rotterdam, The Netherlands; Eternia Studios, Reuver, The Netherlands; Gate Studios, Wolfsburg, Germany
- Genre: Heavy metal, melodic death metal, thrash metal
- Length: 47:38
- Label: Season of Mist
- Producer: Sander Gommans, Joost van den Broek, Hans Pieters, Arjen Lucassen, Amanda Somerville

HDK chronology
System Overload (2009)	Serenades of the Netherworld (2014)

Professional ratings
Review scores
Source	Rating
AllMusic	3.5/5 stars

System Overload is the first album released by Dutch After Forever guitarist Sander Gommans's side project HDK (Hate, Death, Kill). The music of this album is heavier and more extreme than the usual style of After Forever and Gommans created HDK in order to release the album by himself. The album was released on 23 February 2009 on the Label Season of Mist. The many guest musicians involved in the making of this album produced and recorded their parts separately in various recording studios, following basic tracks provided by Gommans.

== Track listing ==
All music by Sander Gommans, all lyrics by Amanda Somerville.

1. "System Overload" – 3:02
2. "Request" – 4:33
3. "Let Go" – 3:33
4. "Terrorist" – 4:19
5. "Pedestal" – 5:23
6. "On Hold" – 3:23
7. "Breakdown" – 5:06
8. "March" – 4:04
9. "Perfect" – 5:14
10. "Fight or Flight" – 4:06
11. "Fine Lines" – 4:55

== Personnel ==
HDK

- Sander Gommans - rhythm/solo/acoustic guitars, grunts/screams/whispers on tracks 2, 3, 5, 7, 8, 9 and 11
- Peter Vink – bass
- Ariën van Weesenbeek – drums

Guests musicians

- Amanda Somerville – female vocals/whispers on tracks 1, 2, 3, 4, 5, 7, 8, 9 and 10
- Joost van den Broek – additional keyboards on tracks 7 and 9, lead keyboards on tracks 5 and 11
- Arjen Lucassen - guitar solo on track 9
- Marcel Coenen - guitar solo on track 10
- Bastiaan Kuiper - guitar solo on track 5
- Andre Matos - clean vocals on tracks 2 and 11
- Jos Severens - additional clean vocals on tracks 1, 4, 9, 10 and 11
- Patrick Savelkoul - grunts/screams on tracks 1, 6 and 10
- Mike Scheijen - screams on tracks 4, 8 and 11
- Paul Niessen - rap vocals on tracks 5, 7 and 11, artwork

Production

- Sander Gommans - producer, engineer, mixing
- Amanda Somerville - vocal producer
- Joost van den Broek - producer and engineer for keyboards and drums recordings, mixing
- Hans Pieters – producer and engineer for drums recording
- Arjen Lucassen – producer and engineer for bass recording and guitar solo on track 9
- Marcel Coenen – engineer for guitar solo on track 10
- Darius van Helfterenn – mastering at Wisseloord Studios, Hilversum
- Jérôme Cros – artwork at Season of Mist Graphic Desk
- Andrea Beckers, Felix Scharf – photography
