= Wyrd (album) =

Studio album by Elvenking
- Released: 19 April 2004
- Recorded: 2003
- Studios: Martin Buchwalter, Gernhart Studios, Germany
- Genres: Power metal Folk metal Celtic metal
- Length: 57:38
- Label: AFM

Elvenking chronology
Heathenreel (2001)	Wyrd (2004)	The Winter Wake (2006)

Professional ratings
Review scores
Source	Rating
Metal Covenant	6/10
Metal Reviews	90/100
Metal Temple	9/10
Metalcry.com	7/10

Wyrd is the second full-length album by Italian folk/power metal band Elvenking. This is their only album without vocalist Damnagoras with lead vocals being performed by Kleid.

== Track listing ==
1. "The Losers' Ball" – 1:49
2. "Pathfinders" – 5:22
3. "Jigsaw Puzzle" – 4:17
4. "The Silk Dilemma" – 4:19
5. "Disappearing Sands" – 4:41
6. "Moonchariot" – 6:49
7. "The Perpetual Knot" – 3:03
8. "Another Haven" – 5:06
9. "A Fiery Stride" – 4:59
10. "Midnight Circus" – 5:04
11. "A Poem for the Firmament" – 12:09

Note

- "Disappearing Sands" and "A Fiery Stride" are bonus tracks on the limited edition of Wyrd.

== Personnel ==
- Kleid - vocals
- Jarpen - guitar, growls and backing vocals
- Aydan - guitars, backing vocals
- Gorlan - bass
- Elyghen - violin, keyboards
- Zender - drums

=== Guest musicians ===
- Pauline Tacey - choirs, female vocals on tracks 1, 3
- Laura De Luca - choirs, female vocals on track 11
- Giada Etro - choirs, female vocals on tracks 4, 5
- Metti Zimmer - vocals on track 7
- Umberto Corazza - flutes

=== String Quartet ===
- Eleonora Steffan
- Massimo Gattel
- Marco Balbinot
- Elyghen
