= Secrets of the Magick Grimoire =

Studio album by Elvenking
- Released: November 10, 2017
- Genres: Folk metal, symphonic metal, power metal
- Length: 61:16
- Label: AFM Records

Elvenking chronology
| The Pagan Manifesto (2014) | Secrets of the Magick Grimoire (2017) | Reader of the Runes (2019) |

Professional ratings
Review scores
| Source | Rating |
|---|---|
| Metal Reviews | 81/100 |
| Metal Storm | 8.6/10 |
| Metal Temple | 9/10 |
| My Global Mind | 9/10 |

Secrets of the Magick Grimoire is the ninth studio album by Italian folk/power metal band, Elvenking, released on November 10, 2017. This is the band's first album with new drummer Marco "Lancs" Lanciotti.

== Track listing ==
| No. | Title | Length |
|---|---|---|
| 1. | "Invoking the Woodland Spirit" | 6:02 |
| 2. | "Draugen’s Maelstrom" | 4:25 |
| 3. | "The One We Shall Follow" | 4:25 |
| 4. | "The Horned Ghost and the Sorcerer" | 4:35 |
| 5. | "A Grain of Truth" | 5:16 |
| 6. | "The Wolves Will Be Howling Your Name" | 5:55 |
| 7. | "3 Ways to Magick" | 4:35 |
| 8. | "Straight Inside Your Winter" | 4:43 |
| 9. | "The Voynich Manuscript" | 6:19 |
| 10. | "Summon the Dawn Light" | 4:57 |
| 11. | "At the Court of the Wild Hunt" | 7:40 |
| 12. | "A Cloak of Dusk" | 2:24 |
| Total length: | | 61:16 |

Limited edition bonus tracks
| No. | Title | Length |
|---|---|---|
| 13. | "Petalstorm" | 4:48 |
| 14. | "The Open Breach" | 4:56 |
| 15. | "Jigsaw Puzzle (2010 version)" | 4:21 |
| 16. | "Skywards (2008 version)" | 4:17 |
| Total length: | | 79:38 |

== Personnel ==
- Damnagoras - Vocals
- Aydan - Guitars
- Rafahel - Guitars
- Jakob - Bass
- Lethien - Violin
- Lancs - Drums

=== Guest musicians ===
- Snowy Shaw (King Diamond, Sabaton, Therion, Dimmu Borgir, among others) – Vocals on "At the Court of the Wild Hunt"
- Angus Norder (Witchery) – Harsh vocals/growls
