= Heathenreel =

Studio album by Elvenking
- Released: 23 July 2001
- Recorded: March 2001
- Studios: New Sin Studios, Italy
- Genres: Folk metal, power metal, progressive metal
- Length: 55:00
- Label: AFM

Elvenking chronology
To Oak Woods Bestowed (demo) (2000)	Heathenreel (2001)	Wyrd (2004)

Professional ratings
Review scores
Source	Rating
Metal Covenant	8/10
Metal Reviews	89/100
Metal Storm	8.5/10

Heathenreel is the debut album of Italian folk/power metal band Elvenking, released on 23 July 2001. It was re-released on vinyl together with The Winter Wake on 11 March 2022.

== Track listing ==
1. "To Oak Woods Bestowed" – 0:46
2. "Pagan Purity" – 4:35
3. "The Dweller of Rhymes" – 4:48
4. "The Regality Dance" – 5:46
5. "White Willow" – 5:59
6. "Skywards" – 5:32
7. "Oakenshield" – 6:37
8. "Hobs an' Feathers" – 2:27
9. "Conjuring of the 14th" – 6:37
10. "A Dreadful Strain" – 4:14
11. "Seasonspeech" – 7:39

Bonus Tracks

1. "Penny Dreadful" – 3:11 (Skyclad cover) (Japanese Bonus)

== Personnel ==
- Damnagoras - vocals
- Jarpen - guitar, death and backing vocals
- Aydan - guitars, backing vocals
- Gorlan - bass
- Zender - drums

=== Guest musicians ===
- Pauline Tacey - soprano female vocals
- Laura De Luca - backing vocals, "Spring" vocals on track 11
- Christiano Bergamo - keyboard arrangements on tracks 4, 6, 7, 9, 10
- Paolo Torresani - keyboard arrangements on tracks 2, 3, 5
- Umberto Corazza - flutes
- Paolo Polesel - fiddles
