= Kiske/Somerville =

Heavy metal music project

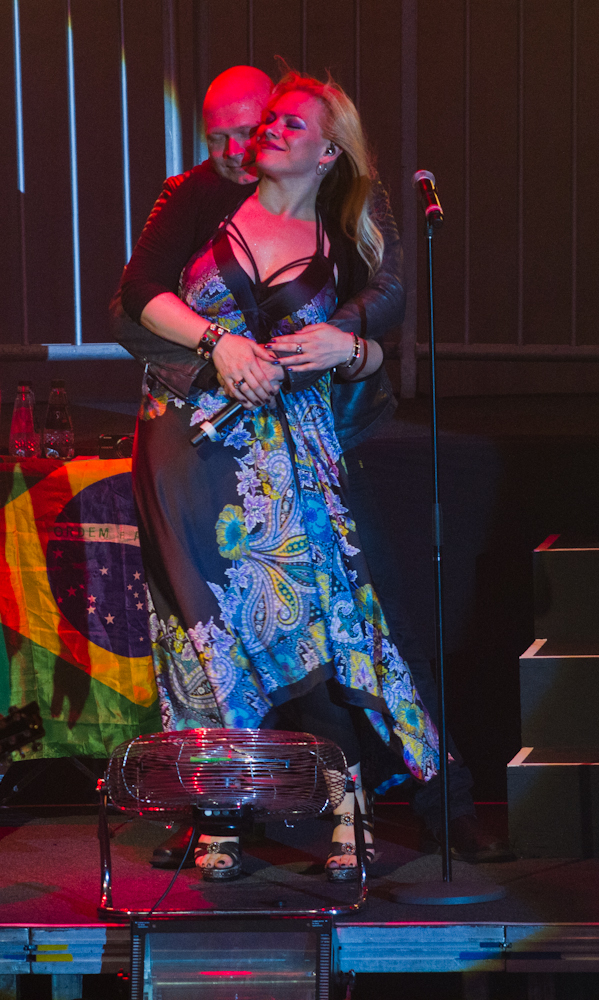
- Michael Kiske and Amanda Somerville performing live in 2013

Background information
- Origin: Flint, Michigan, U.S.
- Genres: Heavy metal; symphonic metal; pop rock; hard rock
- Years active: 2010–present
- Label: Frontiers Records
- Members: Michael Kiske; Amanda Somerville; Mat Sinner; Magnus Karlsson; Veronika Lukesova
- Past members: Sander Gommans; Martin Schmidt; Jimmy Kresic; Ramy Ali

Kiske/Somerville is a melodic heavy metal duet project, put together in late 2009 by Frontiers Records. The project features German singer Michael Kiske (Helloween, Unisonic, Place Vendome) collaborating with American singer Amanda Somerville (Aina, HDK, Trillium, Epica).

The project released the debut album Kiske/Somerville in September 2010, and the second album City of Heroes in April 2015.

== Biography ==
Michael Kiske is a German singer best known for his early work with the German power metal band Helloween. He is the vocalist of the hard rock/heavy metal band Unisonic and has released several solo albums. Kiske has participated on various projects such as Place Vendome and Avantasia and has also recorded guest vocals for numerous rock and metal bands.

Amanda Somerville is an American singer-songwriter and vocal coach who works mostly in Germany and was involved in many productions of German producers Sascha Paeth and Miro. Amanda is the vocalist of the band Trillium and provides vocals for the project HDK. She is featured on the symphonic metal project Aina and has also recorded guest vocals for the band Kamelot.

In late 2009, Serafino Perugino (president of the Italian record label Frontiers Records) hired Mat Sinner (Sinner, Primal Fear) and Magnus Karlsson (Primal Fear) to provide the songwriting for a duet project between Michael Kiske and Amanda Somerville.

The majority of the songwriting for the debut album of the Kiske/Somerville project was supplied by Sinner and Karlsson, with further input from Sander Gommans (After Forever) and Amanda Somerville. The aforementioned musicians together with Jimmy Kresic (Voodoo Circle), Martin Schmidt and Ramy Ali also provided the instrumentation for the album. The self-titled debut album was released on September 24, 2010. Two music videos were filmed for the songs "Silence" and "If I Had A Wish", enabling most of the participants to actually meet in person.

"I did a duet with a female singer on "Breathe in Water" by Indigo Dying. It was so nice that he offered me a chance to make an album of all duet songs with a famous female singer", explains Kiske. "When Mat Sinner asked me if I wanted to be the 'other half' of the face of the album, I was very honored and quite looking forward to working more closely with Michael Kiske" tells Amanda. "We'd both been involved in various projects over the years together, such as Aina and Avantasia, but it was always through third parties and we didn't sing together like we do here. It's not for nothing that Michael's a legend in the scene. He's got a very unique voice, a special delivery of his performance and is a wonderful person on top of it all. This has been a great experience all across the board!". Kiske adds "To sing together with the gifted and beautiful Amanda was another genius idea of Serafino! And it was a most pleasant experience to meet her. Amanda has by far the best female voice I have heard for ages. And the album is a killer."

The second Kiske/Somerville album entitled City of Heroes was released on April 17, 2015. The album once again features bassist Mat Sinner in a songwriting partnership with guitarist Magnus Karlsson, with one song written by Amanda Somerville and Sander Gommans. Karlsson is also in charge of the keyboards, while Veronika Lukesova is the drummer on the album. Two music videos were filmed for the songs "City Of Heroes" and "Walk On Water".

== Members ==
=== Current ===
- Michael Kiske – vocals
- Amanda Somerville – vocals
- Mat Sinner – bass guitar
- Magnus Karlsson – guitar, keyboards
- Veronika Lukesova – drums

=== Former ===
- Sander Gommans – additional lead guitar
- Martin Schmidt – drums
- Jimmy Kresic – keyboards
- Ramy Ali – additional drums

=== Videoclips ===
- Silence on YouTube (2010)
- If I Had a Wish on YouTube (2010)
- City of Heroes on YouTube (2015)
- Walk on Water on YouTube (2015)

== Discography ==
- 2010: Kiske/Somerville
- 2015: City of Heroes
