= Vicky Leandros discography =

- Studio albums: 71
- Compilation albums: 10+
- Singles: 175
- Video albums: 3

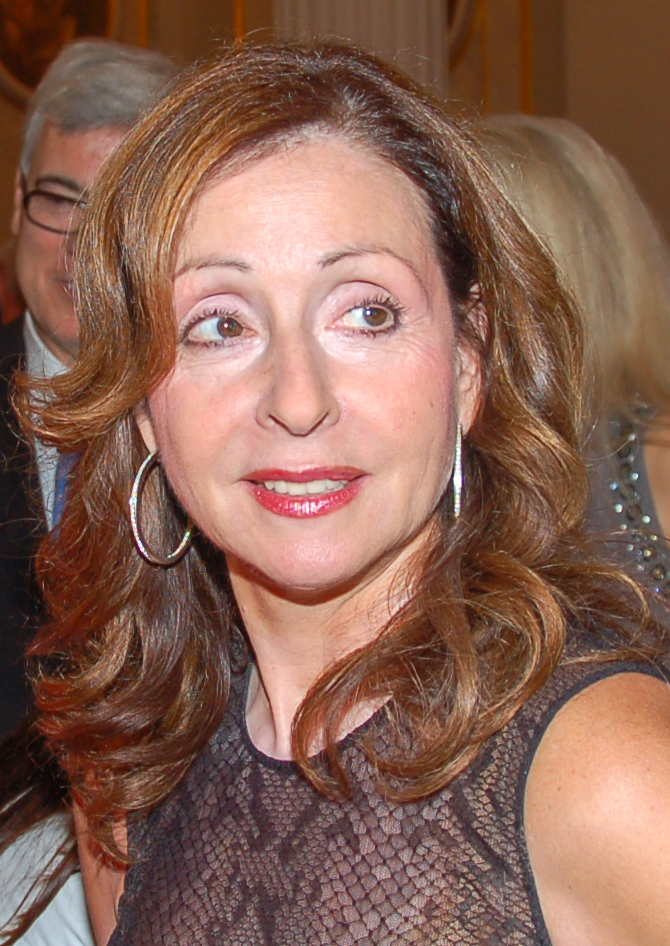
Vicky Leandros in 2010

The following is the discography of Greek singer Vicky Leandros.

== Albums ==
Many variations of Leandros's albums were released around the world and a huge number of compilations still continue to be released on a regular basis. The following is a list of original studio albums she recorded. In Japan, a few albums also contain some songs mainly in Japanese or English which were not released elsewhere though the majority of tracks were recorded in Europe and featured in various languages on albums already listed here. Despite well over a hundred compilation albums having been released, only a handful have been included below.

=== Studio albums ===
Year	Title	Language	Peak chart positions					
Year	Title	Language	AUT	CAN	GER	NL	NOR	QUE
October 1966	Songs und Folklore	German/English/French/Greek	—	—	—	—	—	—
July 1967	A Taste of Vicky	German/French/English/Greek	—	—	—	—	—	—
October 1967	A Taste of Vicky International	English/French/Greek	—	—	—	—	—	—
October 1967	Love Is Blue	English	—	—	—	—	—	—
October 1967	L'amour est bleu	French	—	—	—	—	—	1
July 1968	A Taste of Vicky (First US release)	English/French	—	—	—	—	—	—
August 1968	Summertime Forever	German/French/English	—	—	—	—	—	—
August 1968	Vicky (To Mystiko Sou)	Greek/French/English	—	—	—	—	—	—
December 1968	Le temps des fleurs	French	—	—	—	—	—	1
August 1969	Ich glaub' an dich	German	—	—	—	—	—	—
October 1969	I Mikri Mas Istoria	Greek	—	—	—	—	—	—
October 1969	Zoom sur Vicky	French	—	—	—	—	—	9
September 1970	Vicky (Je suis)	French/Greek	—	—	—	—	—	—
January 1971	Ich bin	German/French/Greek	—	—	33	—	—	—
February 1971	Vicky (Pes Mou Pos Boreis)	Greek/French	—	—	—	—	—	—
March 1971	I Am (First UK release)	English	—	—	—	—	—	—
April 1972	Vicky Leandros	German/English	—	—	7	2	—	—
May 1972	Apres toi	French	—	—	—	—	30	—
May 1972	Mono Esy	Greek/French/English	—	—	—	—	—	—
May 1972	Vicky Leandros	English/French	—	—	—	—	—	—
May 1973	Meine Freunde sind die Träume	German	10	—	13	—	—	—
August 1973	Itan Mia Vrathia	Greek/English	—	—	—	—	—	—
September 1973	Dreams Are Good Friends	English/French/Greek	—	—	—	—	—	—
September 1973	Ceux que j'aime	French/Greek	—	—	—	—	—	—
March 1974	The Love in Your Eyes / When Bouzoukis Played	English/French/Greek	—	80	—	—	—	—
July 1974	Mein Lied für dich	German/English/Greek	—	—	4	—	—	—
August 1974	My Song for You	English/Greek	—	—	—	—	—	—
October 1974	Ma chanson pour toi	French/English/Greek	—	—	—	—	—	—
December 1974	Your World – My World	English/Greek	—	—	—	—	—	—
August 1975	Ich liebe das Leben	German/English	—	—	22	—	—	—
September 1975	Across the Water	English	—	—	—	30	—	—
September 1975	J'aime la Vie	French	—	—	—	—	—	—
January 1976	I Zoi Einai Oraia	Greek/French	—	—	—	—	—	—
February 1977	V.L.	German/English	—	—	16	10	—	—
April 1977	V.L.	Greek/English	—	—	—	—	—	—
April 1977	Vicky Leandros	French/English	—	—	—	—	—	—
September 1977	Omorfa Xronia	Greek/English	—	—	—	—	—	—
October 1977	Du, du liegst mir im Herzen	German	—	—	—	—	—	—
October 1977	Suesser die Glocken nie klingen	German	—	—	—	—	—	—
February 1978	Vicky Leandros	English	—	—	—	—	—	—
March 1978	Ich bin ein Mädchen	German/English	—	—	—	—	—	—
April 1978	Poso S'agapo	Greek/French/English	—	—	—	—	—	—
October 1978	Oh Mi Mama	Spanish/English/Greek/German	—	—	—	—	—	—
October 1979	Singt die schönsten Deutschen Volkslieder	German	—	—	—	—	—	—
April 1981	Ich gehe neue Wege	German/English	—	—	—	—	—	—
October 1981	Love Is Alive	English	—	—	—	—	—	—
January 1982	Irtha Gia Sena	Greek/English	—	—	—	—	—	—
October 1982	Verlorenes Paradies	German	—	—	—	—	—	—
December 1982	Verloren zijn we niet	Dutch/German	—	—	—	34	—	—
October 1983	Vicky	German	—	—	—	—	—	—
May 1984	Vicky	French	—	—	—	—	—	21
October 1985	Eine Nacht in Griechenland	German/Greek	—	—	—	29	—	—
February 1988	Ich Bin Ich	German	—	—	—	—	—	—
October 1989	Pyretos tou Erota	Greek	—	—	—	—	—	—
September 1990	Starkes Gefuehl	German/French	—	—	—	—	—	—
September 1991	Nur einen Augenblick	German	—	—	—	—	—	—
November 1991	Prósexe!	Greek	—	—	—	—	—	—
February 1993	Andres	Greek	—	—	—	—	—	—
October 1995	Lieben und Leben	German/English	—	—	81	—	—	—
April 1997	Gefühle	German	—	—	42	—	—	—
August 1998	Weil mein Herz dich nie mehr vergisst	German	—	—	59	—	—	—
February 2000	Jetzt!	German/English	43	—	52	—	—	—
May 2001	Now!	Greek/French/English/German	—	—	—	—	—	—
October 2001	Mit offenen Armen	German/Greek/English	—	—	—	—	—	—
November 2002	Weihnachten mit Vicky Leandros (CD+DVD)	German/Greek/French/English/Spanish	—	—	—	—	—	—
September 2003	...Singt Mikis Theodorakis	German/Greek	—	—	78	—	—	—
December 2003	Tragouthi Alliotiko	Greek/English	—	—	—	—	—	—
March 2006	Ich bin wie ich bin	German/French/English	—	—	65	—	—	—
March 2009	Möge der Himmel	German/English/French	55	—	26	—	—	—
September 2010	Zeitlos	German	—	—	—	—	—	—
October 2015	Ich weiß, dass ich nichts weiß	German	—	—	66	—	—	—
"—" denotes releases that did not chart or were not released in that territory.

=== Compilation albums ===
Year	Title	Peak chart positions			
Year	Title	BE (FLA)	GER	JPN	QUE
1969	Vicky und ihre Hits	—	—	—	—
1969	Vicky Custom Deluxe	—	—	67	—
1970	Les grands succès de Vicky	—	—	—	1
1973	Greatest Hits	—	—	—	—
1977	Lieder die ich liebe	—	20	—	—
1995	Back to Back – The Best of Vicky Leandros & Demis Roussos	19	—	—	—
1997	Meine großen Erfolge	—	86	—	—
2000	Einfach das Beste	—	—	—	—
2002	L'amour est bleu. Succès – volume 1	—	—	—	7
2012	Best Of	—	—	—	—
"—" denotes releases that did not chart or were not released

=== Video albums ===
Year	Title
2002	Weihnachten mit Vicky Leandros – Live aus der St. Michaeliskirche
2005	Après toi
2006	Ich bin wie in bin

== Singles ==
=== 1960s ===
Year	Single	Peak chart positions						
Year	Single	AUT	BE (WA)	GER	IRE	JPN	NL	QUE
1965	"Messer, Gabel, Schere, Licht" (Germany and Switzerland-only release)	—	—	16	—	—	—	—
1965	"Deine Rosen vom ersten Rendezvouz" (Germany and Netherlands-only release)	—	—	31	—	—	—	—
1966	"Wenn du gehn willst" (Germany and Netherlands-only release)	—	—	22	—	—	—	—
1966	"Dich mit andern teilen kann ich nicht" (Germany-only release)	—	—	—	—	—	—	—
1967	"L'amour est bleu"	18	45	27	—	25	—	3
1967	"Colours of Love" (UK-only release) (Note: "Colours of Love" is a re-recorded version of the English-language version of "L'amour est bleu" ("Love Is Blue") with a different musical arrangement.)	—	—	—	—	—	—	—
1967	"Grünes Licht" (Austria and Germany-only release)	—	—	36	—	—	—	—
1967	"Sunshine Boy" (UK-only release)	—	—	—	—	—	—	—
1967	"Les amoureux" (Note: "Les amoureux" was released as the flip side to "L'amour est bleu" in Canada, France and Greece.)	—	—	—	—	—	—	16
1967	"Morgen sehen wir uns wieder" (Austria, Germany and Netherlands-only release)	—	—	20	—	—	—	—
1967	"Sunday for Waiting in Vain" b/w "Massachusetts" (Japan-only release)	—	—	—	—	29; 95	—	—
1968	"Un jour mon rêve" (Canada-only release)	—	—	—	—	—	—	4
1968	"Dance with Me Until Tomorrow" (UK, USA and Japan-only release)	—	—	—	—	64	—	—
1968	"Love Is Blue" (Canada and Germany-only release) (Note: "Love Is Blue" is the English-language version of "L'amour est bleu".)	—	—	—	—	—	—	1
1968	"Quand j'entends la pluie" (Canada-only release)	—	—	—	—	—	—	24
1968	"Heut war Premiere" (Austria and Germany-only release)	—	—	18	—	—	—	—
1968	"Casa Bianca" (Japan-only release)	—	—	—	—	32	—	—
1968	"Watashi No Suki Na Chocolate (I Like Chocolate)" (Japan-only release)	—	—	—	—	84	—	—
1968	"Bunter Luftballon" (Austria, Germany and Netherlands-only release)	—	—	15	—	—	—	—
1968	"C'est la première" b/w "Un Deux Trois" (Canada and France-only release) (Note: "C'est la première" is the French-language version of "Heut war Premiere". An English version, "The Curtains Falling", was also released in Canada.)	—	—	—	—	—	—	2; 35
1968	"Τώρα Γυρίζω" (Greece-only release)	—	—	—	—	—	—	—
1968	"Le temps des fleurs" (Canada, Greece and Japan-only release)	—	—	—	—	21	—	1
1968	"Le soleil a quitté ma maison"	—	—	—	—	—	—	—
1968	"Μια Φορά Κι' Έναν Καιρό" (Greece-only release)	—	—	—	—	—	—	—
1969	"Karussell d'amour" (Austria, Germany and Netherlands-only release)	—	—	18	—	—	—	—
1969	"Kleiner Prinz" (Japan-only release)	—	—	—	—	95	—	—
1969	"Carrrousel d'amour" (Canada-only release) (Note: "Carrousel d'amour" is the French-language version of "Karussell d'amour".)	—	—	—	—	—	—	5
1969	"L'enfant au ballon" (Canada-only release) (Note: "L'enfant au ballon" is the French-language version of "Bunter Luftballon".)	—	—	—	—	—	—	30
1969	"Halt die Welt an" (Austria and Germany-only release)	15	—	29	—	—	—	—
1969	"Sieh die Welt mit meinen Augen" (Netherlands-only release)	—	—	—	—	—	—	—
1969	"Les moulins de mon coeur" b/w "Mon coeur sous les drapeaux" (US and Canada-only release)	—	—	—	—	—	—	17; 30
1969	"Όταν Φτάσης Στην Αθήνα" (Greece-only release)	—	—	—	—	—	—	—
1969	"A bord d'un apollo" (Canada-only release)	—	—	—	—	—	—	17
1969	"Ouvre les yeux sur le monde" (Japan-only release)	—	—	—	—	—	—	—
1969	"Klipp und klar" (Germany-only release)	—	—	23	—	—	—	—
"—" denotes releases that did not chart or were not released in that territory.

=== 1970s ===
Year	Single	Peak chart positions										
Year	Single	AUS	AUT	BE (FLA)	BE (WA)	GER	IRE	JPN	NL	QUE	SWI	UK
1970	"As Time Goes By" (Japan-only release)	—	—	—	—	—	—	49	—	—	—	—
1970	"Eri un gioco" (Italy and Japan-only release)	—	—	—	—	—	—	—	—	—	—	—
1970	"Mon cœur ne chante pas" b/w "Je t'ai dit au revoir" (Canada-only release) (Note: "Mon cœur ne chante pas" b/w "Je t'ai dit au revoir" is the French-language version of "Klipp und klar" b/w "Medizin für's Herz" with the sides flipped.)	—	—	—	—	—	—	—	—	7; 21	—	—
1970	"St. Tropez – Gitarren bei Nacht" (Austria, Germany and Netherlands-only release)	—	—	—	—	25	—	—	—	—	—	—
1970	"Κακομαθημένο Παιδί" (Greece-only release) (Note: "Κακομαθημένο Παιδί" is the Greek-language version of "St. Tropez")	—	—	—	—	—	—	—	—	—	—	—
1970	"Foggy Night" (Japan-only release)	—	—	—	—	—	—	—	—	—	—	—
1970	"Ich bin" (Austria and Germany-only release)	—	—	—	—	13	—	—	—	—	—	—
1971	"Wo ist er?" (as Vicky Leandros Singers; Germany-only release)	—	—	—	—	19	—	—	—	—	—	—
1971	"L'or" (Canada and France-only release)	—	—	—	—	—	—	—	—	30	—	—
1971	"Που Νάναι Αυτός" (Greece-only release) (Note: "Που Νάναι Αυτός" is the Greek version of "Wo ist er", a cover of George Harrison's "My Sweet Lord".)	—	—	—	—	—	—	—	—	—	—	—
1971	"I Am" (UK, South Africa, Japan and the Netherlands-only release) (Note: "I Am" is the English-language version of "Ich bin".)	—	—	—	—	—	—	—	—	—	—	—
1971	"Wenn die Sehnsucht nicht wär'" (Germany-only release)	—	—	—	—	—	—	—	—	—	—	—
1971	"Όταν Είμαι Κοντά Σου" (Greece-only release)	—	—	—	—	—	—	—	—	—	—	—
1971	"Ne me quitte pas" (Canada-only release)	—	—	—	—	—	—	—	—	10	—	—
1971	"Φωτιά στα μάτια" (Greece-only release)	—	—	—	—	—	—	—	—	—	—	—
1971	"Donne moi le temps" b/w "Hey, Joe Mckenzie" (Canada-only release)^{A}	—	—	—	—	—	—	—	—	— 30	—	—
1972	"Le temps d'être une femme" (France-only release)	—	—	—	—	—	—	—	—	—	—	—
1972	"Après toi"	—	—	1	1	11	3	—	1	11	1	—
1972	"Come What May" (Note: "Come What May" is the English-language version of "Après toi".)	23	—	—	—	—	2	—	—	—	—	2
1972	"Dann kamst du" (Germany and Austria-only release) (Note: "Dann kamst du" is the German-language version of "Après toi".)	—	—	—	—	11	—	—	—	—	—	—
1972	"Mono Eσυ" (Greece-only release) (Note: "Mono Eσυ" is the Greek-language version of "Après toi".)	—	—	—	—	—	—	—	—	—	—	—
1972	"Ich hab' die Liebe geseh'n"	—	1	4	—	2	—	—	1	—	2	—
1972	"Country Freedom" (UK, Ireland and Portugal-only release)	—	—	—	—	—	—	—	—	—	—	—
1972	"Comme je suis"	—	—	—	42	—	—	—	12	—	—	—
1972	"L'amour brilliant dans tes yeux"	—	—	—	—	—	—	—	—	—	—	—
1972	"Auntie" (Various artists; Germany, Netherlands and Greece-only release) (Note: With Hildegard Knef, Enrico Macias, Alice Babs, Sandra & Andres and Demis Roussos.)	—	—	—	—	—	—	—	4	—	—	—
1972	"The Love in Your Eyes" b/w "You Answered My Prayer"	—	—	—	—	—	6	—	—	— 50	—	40
1972	"Laissez les enfants croire" (Canada-only release)	—	—	—	—	—	—	—	—	10	—	—
1973	"Die Bouzouki klang durch die Sommernacht"	—	9	12	—	4	—	—	5	—	2	—
1973	"When Bouzoukis Played" (Note: "When Bouzoukis Played" is the English-language version of "Die Bouzouki klang durch die Sommernacht".)	45	—	—	—	—	—	—	—	—	—	44
1973	"Chante bouzouki" (Note: "Chante bouzoukis" is the French-language version of "Die Bouzouki klang durch die Sommernacht".)	—	—	—	46	—	—	—	—	4	—	—
1973	"Ήταν Μια Βραδυά" (Greece-only release) (Note: "Ήταν Μια Βραδυά" is the Greek-language version of "Die Bouzouki klang durch die Sommernacht".)	—	—	—	—	—	—	—	—	—	—	—
1973	"St. Tropez – Gitarren bei Nacht" (Netherlands and Belgium-only reissue)	—	—	24	—	—	—	—	7	—	—	—
1973	"Des amoureux comme toi" (France-only release)	—	—	—	—	—	—	—	—	—	—	—
1973	"Auf Wiedersehn, ihr Freunde mein"	—	—	—	—	12	—	—	—	—	—	—
1973	"Meine Freunde sind die Träume" (Netherlands-only release)	—	—	—	—	—	—	—	22	—	—	—
1973	"Ένας Ξένος" (Greece-only release)	—	—	—	—	—	—	—	—	—	—	—
1973	"Ceux que j'aime" (Canada-only release)	—	—	—	—	—	—	—	—	10	—	—
1974	"Dreams Are Good Friends" (UK, Ireland and South Africa-only release) (Note: "Dreams Are Good Friends" is the English-language version of "Meine Freunde sind die Träume".)	—	—	—	—	—	—	—	—	—	—	—
1974	"Liebe" (Portugal-only release)	—	—	—	—	—	—	—	—	—	—	—
1974	"Theo, wir fahr‘n nach Lodz"	—	15	—	—	1	—	—	12	—	5	—
1974	"Theo, on va au bal" (Note: "Theo, on va au bal" is the French-language version of "Theo, wir fahr‘n nach Lodz".)	—	—	—	—	—	—	—	—	—	—	—
1974	"Henry, Let's Go to Town" (Canada, South Africa and Portugal-only release) (Note: "Henry, Let's Go to Town" is the English-language version of "Theo, wir fahr‘n nach Lodz".)	—	—	—	—	—	—	—	—	—	—	—
1974	"Du läßt mir meine Welt"	—	—	—	—	9	—	—	—	—	—	—
1974	"Ο Καϋμός" (Greece-only release)	—	—	—	—	—	—	—	—	—	—	—
1974	"Je t'ai rêvé comme ça" (France-only release)	—	—	—	—	—	—	—	—	—	—	—
1974	"Danny, Teach Me to Dance" (UK, South Africa, Ireland and Australia-only release)	—	—	—	—	—	—	—	—	—	—	—
1975	"Rot ist die Liebe" (Austria and Germany-only release)	—	—	—	—	15	—	—	—	—	—	—
1975	"More Than That (I'm Losing You)" (USA, UK, Ireland, South Africa - release)	—	—	—	—	—	—	—	—	—	—	—
1975	"Ja, ja der Peter der ist schlau"	—	15	—	—	13	—	—	—	—	—	—
1975	"J'aime la vie" (France and Belgium-only release)	—	—	—	28	—	—	—	—	—	—	—
1976	"Ich liebe das Leben" (Austria, Germany and Netherlands-only release)	—	—	—	—	10	—	—	18	—	—	—
1976	"C'est la vie, Papa"	—	—	—	50	—	—	—	—	—	—	—
1976	"Across the Water" (Spain-only release)	—	—	—	—	—	—	—	—	—	—	—
1976	"Ce matin là" (Canada-only release)	—	—	—	—	—	—	—	—	—	—	—
1976	"Tango d'amor"	—	—	4	—	19	—	—	3	—	7	—
1976	"Notre tango d'amour" (Note: "Notre tango d'amour" is the French-language version of "Tango d'amor".)	—	—	—	15	—	—	—	—	—	—	—
1976	"Un été" (Canada-only release)	—	—	—	—	—	—	—	—	17	—	—
1976	"Weißt Du woraus die Träume sind" (Germany-only release)	—	—	—	—	32	—	—	—	—	—	—
1976	"Drehorgelmann" (Germany-only release)	—	—	—	—	—	—	—	—	—	—	—
1977	"Der Wein der Liebe" (Austria and Germany-only release)	—	—	—	—	—	—	—	—	—	—	—
1977	"Comme tu aimes, comme tu veux" (France-only release)	—	—	—	—	—	—	—	—	—	—	—
1977	"Auf dem Mond da blühen keine Rosen"	—	20	24	49	9	—	—	9	—	5	—
1977	"Sur la lune il n'y a pas de roses" (Belgium, Canada, France and Portugal-only release) (Note: "Sur la lune il n'y a pas de roses" is the French-language version of "Auf dem Mond da blühen keine Rosen".)	—	—	—	49	—	—	—	—	1	—	—
1977	"Aba Heidschi" (Germany-only release)	—	—	—	—	—	—	—	—	—	—	—
1977	"Kali Nichta (Gute Nacht" (Germany and Netherlands-only release)	—	—	—	—	17	—	—	22	—	—	—
1977	"Muss i denn" (Germany-only release)	—	—	—	—	—	—	—	—	—	—	—
1977	"Το Τελευταίο Ταγκό" (Greece-only release) (Note: "Το Τελευταίο Ταγκό" is the Greek-language version of "Tango d'amor".)	—	—	—	—	—	—	—	—	—	—	—
1977	"Die letzte Rose" (Germany-only release)	—	—	—	—	—	—	—	—	—	—	—
1977	"Εσύ" (Greece-only release)	—	—	—	—	—	—	—	—	—	—	—
1977	"Ποιός Είσαι Συ" (Greece-only release)	—	—	—	—	—	—	—	—	—	—	—
1978	"Et je l'aime encore" (Canada-only release)	—	—	—	—	—	—	—	—	27	—	—
1978	"Bye Bye My Love" (Germany and Netherlands-only release)	—	—	—	—	44	—	—	—	—	—	—
1978	"Wer weint denn schon um einen Mann" (Germany-only release)	—	—	—	—	—	—	—	—	—	—	—
1978	"Τι Κάθεσαι Και Κλαις" (Greece-only release)	—	—	—	—	—	—	—	—	—	—	—
1978	"Oh Mi Mama" (Spain-only release)	—	—	—	—	—	—	—	—	—	—	—
1979	"Ich bin für dich da" (Germany-only release)	—	—	—	—	46	—	—	—	—	—	—
1979	"Katharina die kleine" (Germany-only release)	—	—	—	—	—	—	—	—	—	—	—
"—" denotes releases that did not chart or were not released in that territory.

- ^{A}"Hey, Joe McKenzie" reached No. 1 on Canada's RPM AC chart, September 14, 1974.

=== 1980s ===
Year	Single	Peak chart positions			
Year	Single	BE (FLA)	GER	NL	QUE
1980	"Gute Reise Mon Amour" (Germany-only release)	—	—	—	—
1981	"Kinder der Sonne" (Austria, Germany and Netherlands-only release)	—	—	—	—
1981	"Du bist gut" (Germany-only release)	—	—	—	—
1981	"Love's Alive"	—	—	—	—
1981	"Ich weiß, daß Liebe lebt" (Germany-only release) (Note: "Ich weiß, daß Liebe lebt" is the German-language version of "Love's Alive".)	—	—	—	—
1981	"Je t'aime mon amour" (with Demis Roussos; Netherlands-only release)	—	—	41	—
1982	"Maria mit dem gelben Kleid" (Germany-only release)	—	—	—	—
1982	"Verlorenes Paradies" (Germany-only release)	—	22	—	—
1982	"Verloren zijn we niet" (Belgium and Netherlands-only release) (Note: "Verloren zijn we niet" is the Dutch-language version of "Verlorenes Paradies".)	15	—	10	—
1983	"Grüße an Sarah" (Germany-only release)	—	—	—	—
1983	"Ver van het leven" (Netherlands-only release)	—	—	—	—
1984	"Ich hab' noch ein paar Tränen bei dir gut" (Germany-only release)	—	—	—	—
1984	"Mein schweigender Freund" (Germany-only release)	—	—	—	—
1984	"À l'est d'eden" (Canada and France-only release)	—	—	—	1
1984	"Tu as sept ponts à traverser" (Canada and France-only release)	—	—	—	—
1985	"Die nacht ist noch jung" (Netherlands-only release)	—	—	—	—
1985	"Wunderbar" (Germany and Netherlands-only release)	—	—	—	—
1985	"Salut bien Sarah" (Canada-only release)	—	—	—	7
1988	"Du hast schon längst Goodbye gesagt" (Germany-only release)	—	—	—	—
1988	"Oh, oh, oh" (Germany-only release)	—	—	—	—
1989	"Something's Gotten Hold of My Heart (Το Μυστικό Σου)" (Remixes '89; Greece-only release)	—	—	—	—
"—" denotes releases that did not chart or were not released in that territory.

=== 1990s–present ===
Year	Single	Peak chart positions
Year	Single	GER
1990	"Süchtig nach Geborgenheit" (Germany-only release)	—
1990	"Die Welt vor deinem Fenster" (Germany-only release)	—
1991	"S'agapo" (Germany-only release)	—
1991	"Nur mit dir" (Germany-only release)	—
1994	"Du bist mein schönster Gedanke" (Germany-only release)	72
1995	"We're Gonna Stay Together" (with Tony Christie; Germany and Netherlands-only release)	—
1995	"Es ist so schön, daß es dich gibt" (Germany-only release)	—
1995	"Heute will ich lieben und leben" (Germany and Netherlands-only release)	—
1997	"Günther gestehe" (Germany-only release)	90
1997	"Manolito" (Germany-only release)	—
1997	"Liebe" (Germany-only release)	—
1997	"Ich fange ohne dich neu an" (Germany-only release)	—
1998	"So stark hab' ich noch nie gefühlt" (Germany-only release)	—
1998	"Weil mein Herz dich nie mehr vergisst" (Germany-only release)	25
1998	"Du" (Germany-only release)	—
1998	"Durch deine Liebe" (Germany promo-only release)	—
1999	"Du gehst mir unter die Haut" (Germany promo-only release)	—
1999	"Zu Hause in Griechenland" (Germany promo-only release)	—
1999	"Eine große Liebe" (Germany promo-only release)	—
1999	"Du und ich – ein Leben lang" (Germany promo-only release)	—
2000	"Ich liebe meinen Mann so sehr" (Germany promo-only release)	—
2000	"Und ich fliege zu dir" (Germany-only release)	—
2000	"Es geht mir wieder gut" (Germany-only release)	—
2000	"Me quedaré – Ich bleib bei dir" (with Roland Cabezas; Germany-only release)	—
2000	"Separate Tables" (with Chris de Burgh; Germany and Greece promo-only release)	—
2001	"Tanz mit mir" (Germany promo-only release)	—
2001	"Sieh das Licht in der Nacht" (Germany-only release)	—
2002	"Eleni" (Germany promo-only release)	—
2002	"Goodbye My Love Goodbye" (Germany promo-only release)	—
2003	"Erinner' dich an die Träume" (Germany promo-only release)	—
2004	"Das Lied von Zorba" (Germany promo-only release)	—
2004	"Zauber einer Nacht" (Germany promo-only release)	—
2005	"Felix" (Germany-only release)	—
2005	"Fremd in einer großen Stadt" (Germany promo-only release)	—
2006	"Don't Break My Heart" (Germany-only release)	69
2009	"Möge der Himmel" (Austria, Germany and Switzerland-only release)	78
2010	"Ich sage dir Adieu" (Germany promo-only release)	—
2010	"Doch ich seh all die Rosen" (Germany promo-only release)	—
2011	"C'est Bleu" (as Scooter feat. Vicky Leandros; Denmark and Germany-only release)	77
2015	"Das Leben und ich" (Germany promo-only release)	—
2016	"Ich weiss, dass ich nichts weiss" (Germany promo-only release)	—
"—" denotes releases that did not chart or were not released in that territory.
