= Windows (Amanda Somerville album) =

Studio album by Amanda Somerville
- Released: Dec 30, 2008; May 05, 2009
- Recorded: 2003–2008
- Studio: Gate Studios and Pathway Studios, Wolfsburg, Germany
- Genre: Pop, rock, jazz
- Length: 50:44
- Label: Hya! Records self-release
- Producer: Sascha Paeth and Miro

Windows is a solo studio album by American singer Amanda Somerville.

== Track listing ==
All tracks are written by Amanda Somerville, except where indicated

No.	Title	Writer(s)	Length
1.	"Mayday"		4:41
2.	"Point of Safe Return"		4:08
3.	"Moth"		3:51
4.	"My Song for You"		3:54
5.	"Get Me"		4:40
6.	"Inner Whore"		3:42
7.	"Out" (Lunatica cover)	Sascha Paeth	3:46
8.	"Carnival"		4:10
9.	"Clean"	Somerville, Paeth	3:28
10.	"Sometimes"	Somerville, Ashley Peacock	4:23
11.	"All That I Am"		5:10
12.	"Windows"		4:51

== Personnel ==
- Amanda Somerville - lead & backing vocals, keyboards
- Sascha Paeth - guitars, backing vocals, producer, engineer, mixing and mastering
- Miro - keyboards, backing vocals, producer, engineer, mixing and mastering
- Olaf Reitmeier - bass
- Robert Hunecke-Rizzo - drums
