= Elvenking (band) =

Italian folk metal band

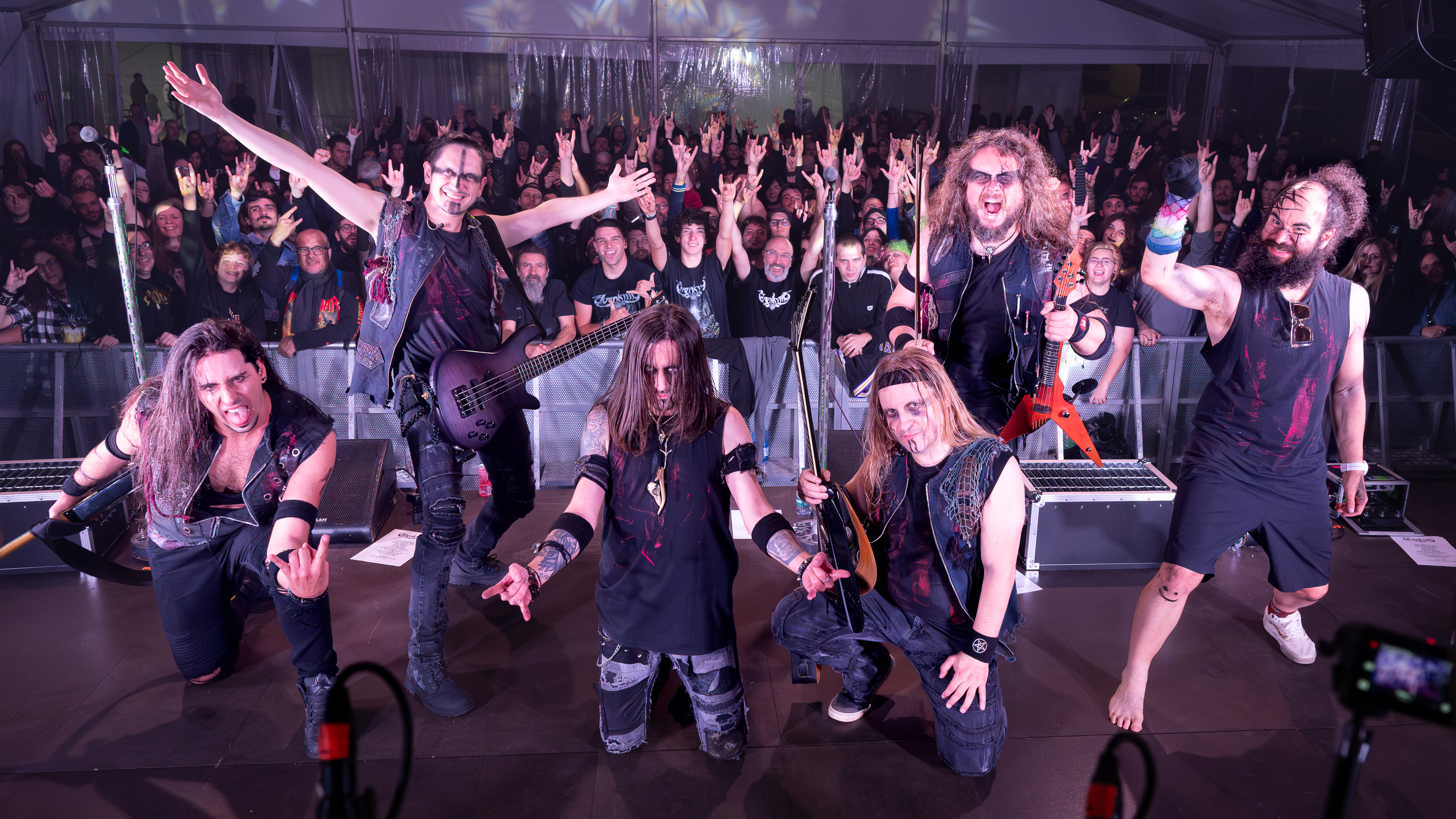
- Elvenking in 2025

Background information
- Origin: Sacile, Italy
- Genres: Power metal; folk metal
- Years active: 1997–present
- Label: AFM
- Members: Aydan; Damnagoras; Headmatt; Lethien; Jakob; Symohn
- Website: elvenking.net

Elvenking is an Italian power metal/folk metal band from Sacile. They have released twelve full-length studio albums.

== History ==
=== Origins (1997–2000) ===
Elvenking was formed in late October 1997 by two guitarist friends, Aydan and Jarpen, both sharing a passion for heavy metal music and folklore. They were soon joined by Sargon as bassist. In March 1998, Damnagoras joined the band as a lead singer, and was followed by the arrival of the drummer Zender in September.

The members of Elvenking intended to create a fusion of power metal and folk music. After gaining experience through many shows, the band decided to record a promotional album, To Oak Woods Bestowed, in 2000. Damnagoras performed both lead vocals and bass for the recording and subsequent concerts as Sargon had previously left the band. The demo was successful enough to allow Elvenking to sign a contract with German label AFM Records.

Soon after, Gorlan, a friend of Aydan and Jarpen, fully joined as a bassist. He had appeared previously as a session player.

=== First six albums (2001–2010) ===
The band's first full-length album, Heathenreel, was recorded at New Sin Audio Design by Luigi Stefanini and mixed at Fredman Studios by Fredrik Nordstrom. The cover artwork was created by Travis Smith and the band's logo was designed by J.P. Fournier, who also designed covers for Avantasia and Immortal. The album was released on 23 July 2001. Elvenking then toured around Europe at festivals with power metal acts including Blind Guardian, Gamma Ray, Edguy and Virgin Steele.

In August 2002, singer Damnagoras took leave from the band due to health concerns. Elvenking then recruited a new vocalist, Kleid. Elyghen, a violinist and keyboard player, joined soon after. The shift in the line-up led to their second album, Wyrd, recorded at Gernhart studios in Siegburg with Martin Buchwalter, and mixed & mastered at House of music studios with Achim Kolher and released on 19 April 2004.

In late 2004 Damnagoras returned, taking the place of Kleid, and Elvenking began working on their third album, The Winter Wake.

On 4 February 2005, founding guitarist Jarpen left Elvenking. Aydan commented:

"Jarpen didn't feel comfortable playing Elvenking's music anymore having lost passion in this kind of stuff. It was a long time he was talking with us about and when Damna was back in, knowing the direction we wanted to go, he told us his willing to leave. We have tried to convince him to give it a try, but it did not work out.

It's a really sad thing because Jarpen was one of the founding members and we have created all this from the beginning together, but on the other hand being friends before musicians we know that this is what Jarpen wanted and we totally respect his decision.

We will miss you, friend!"

The Winter Wake was released and premiered live on 11 March 2006 in Pordenone, Italy.

On 3 November 2006, a new album was announced to be in the works according to the official website; The Scythe was released on 14 September 2007.

On 9 February 2010 it was announced that Dennis Ward would be producing Elvenking's new album, with Mat Sinner taking the role of executive producer. The recordings started on 20 March. The album, called Red Silent Tides, was released on 17 September in Europe, and 9 November in North America.

After the release of Red Silent Tides, the band started a full European tour to support the album. Part of this tour was spent supporting German power metal band Primal Fear.

=== Era, The Pagan Manifesto and Secrets of the Magick Grimoire (2011–2017) ===
Era, Elvenking's seventh studio album, was released in September 2012. The band released their eighth studio album, Pagan Manifesto, on 9 May 2014 in the U.K. and on 27 May 2014 in the U.S., with the same line-up intact from their previous effort. The first single, Elvenlegions, was released on SoundCloud. An accompanying music video for the song was released in late April. The album marked a return to the folk/power metal sound of the band's first two albums. The song "King of the Elves" contains a medley of "White Willow", a song from their first album, Heathenreel, as well as revisiting some familiar lyrical lines of the song. The track is roughly 13 minutes long, the longest in the Elvenking catalog.

The official lyric video for "Draugen's Maelstrom" on their upcoming album was released on 5 October 2017. On 10 November 2017, Elvenking released their ninth studio album titled Secrets of the Magick Grimoire with Symohn being replaced by Lancs on drums.

=== Reader of the Runes Trilogy (2019–present) ===
On 30 August 2019, the band published their tenth studio album, Reader of the Runes – Divination, intended to kick off a new trilogy of concept albums. A follow-up album, Reader of the Runes – Rapture, saw release on 28 April 2023. The third installment of the trilogy, Reader of the Runes – Luna, was released on 11 April 2025.

An EP titled Rites of Disclosure will be released on 22 May 2026. The release consists of standalone singles from the Reader of the Runes era, two new tracks, and several cover songs. The physical edition includes four additional tracks that were only released digitally.

== Musical style and influences ==
Guitarist Aydan was quoted in an interview in 2001 as stating, "Well, our influences come from all the metal scene and obviously from a lot of folk music and dances from all over the world. For what about the metal part, from power to thrash or death metal, we listen all! To name you a few bands Skyclad, Blind Guardian, In Flames, Soilwork, Helloween, Mercyful Fate/King Diamond, Annihilator, Cradle Of Filth, Dark Tranquillity..."

The vocal style is usually clean singing, though harsh vocals were provided by former guitarist Jarpen who left the band in 2005.

== Band members ==
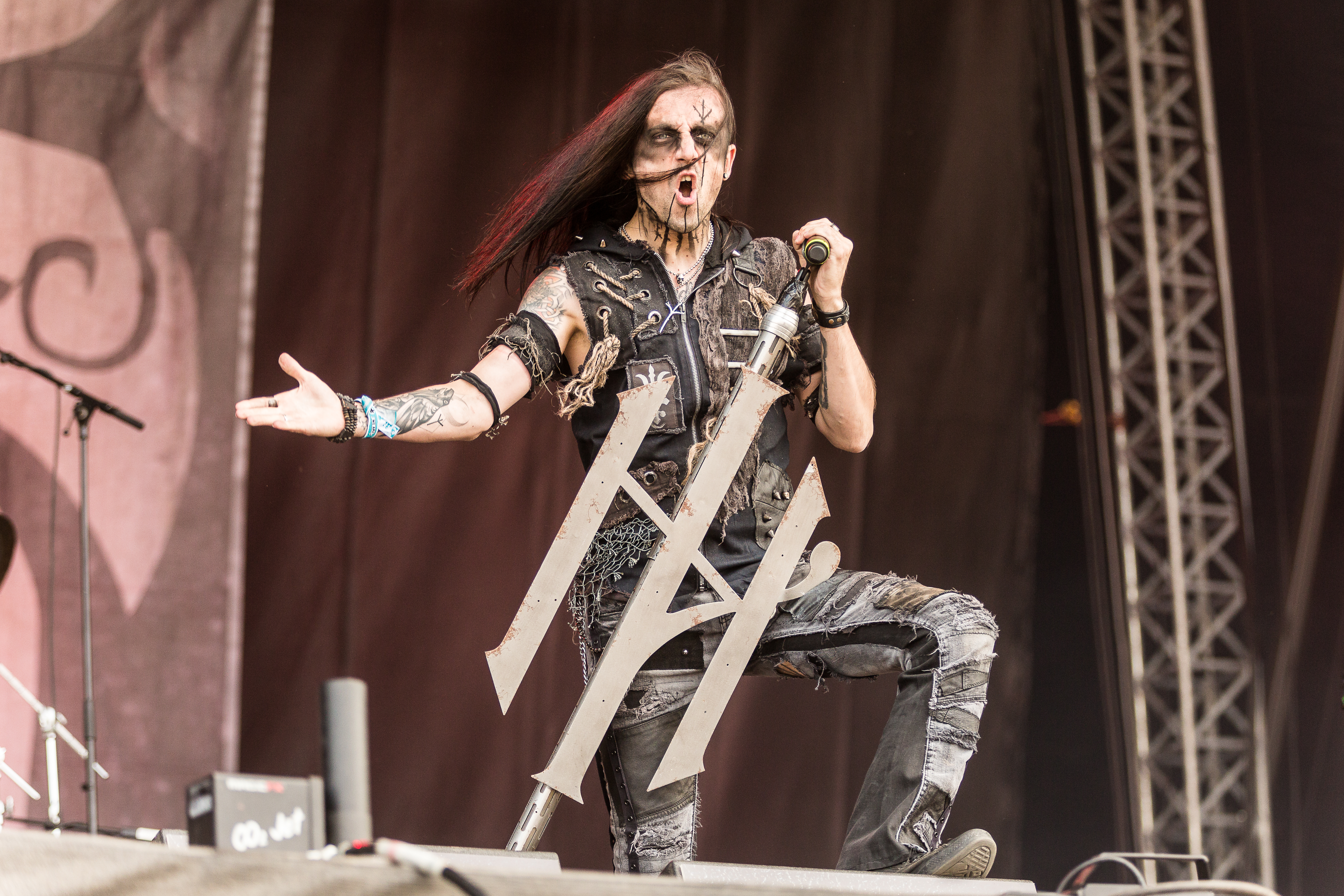
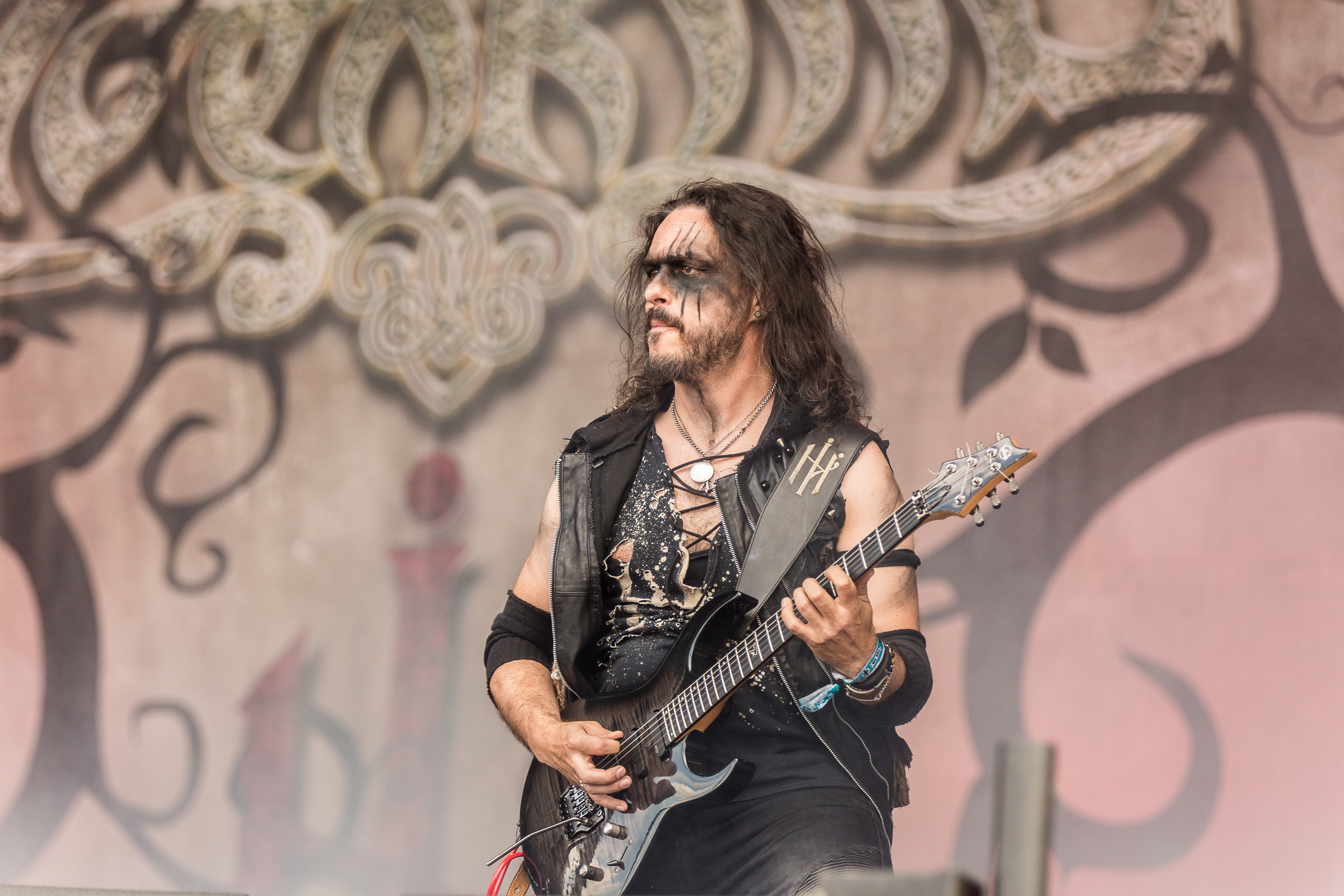
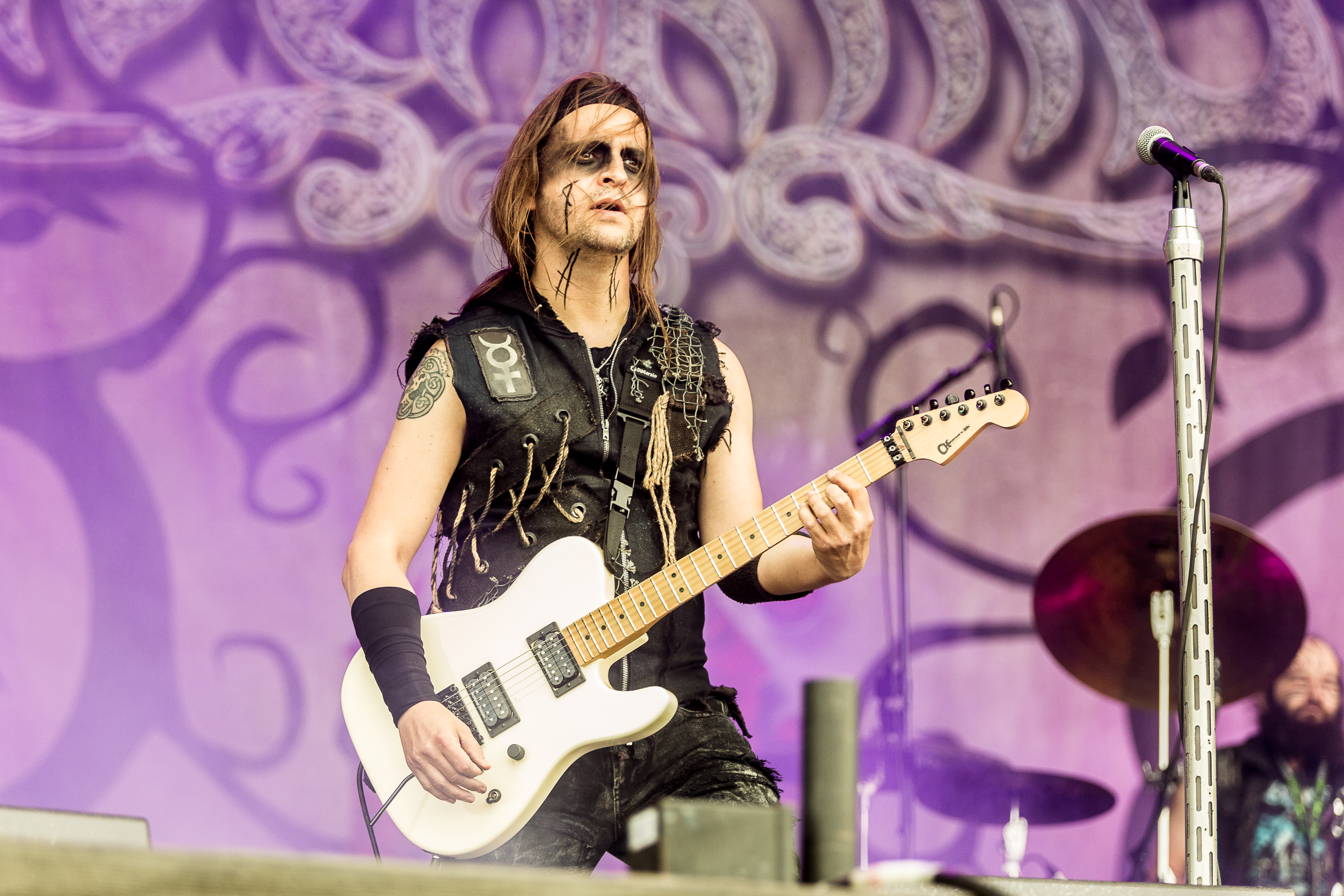
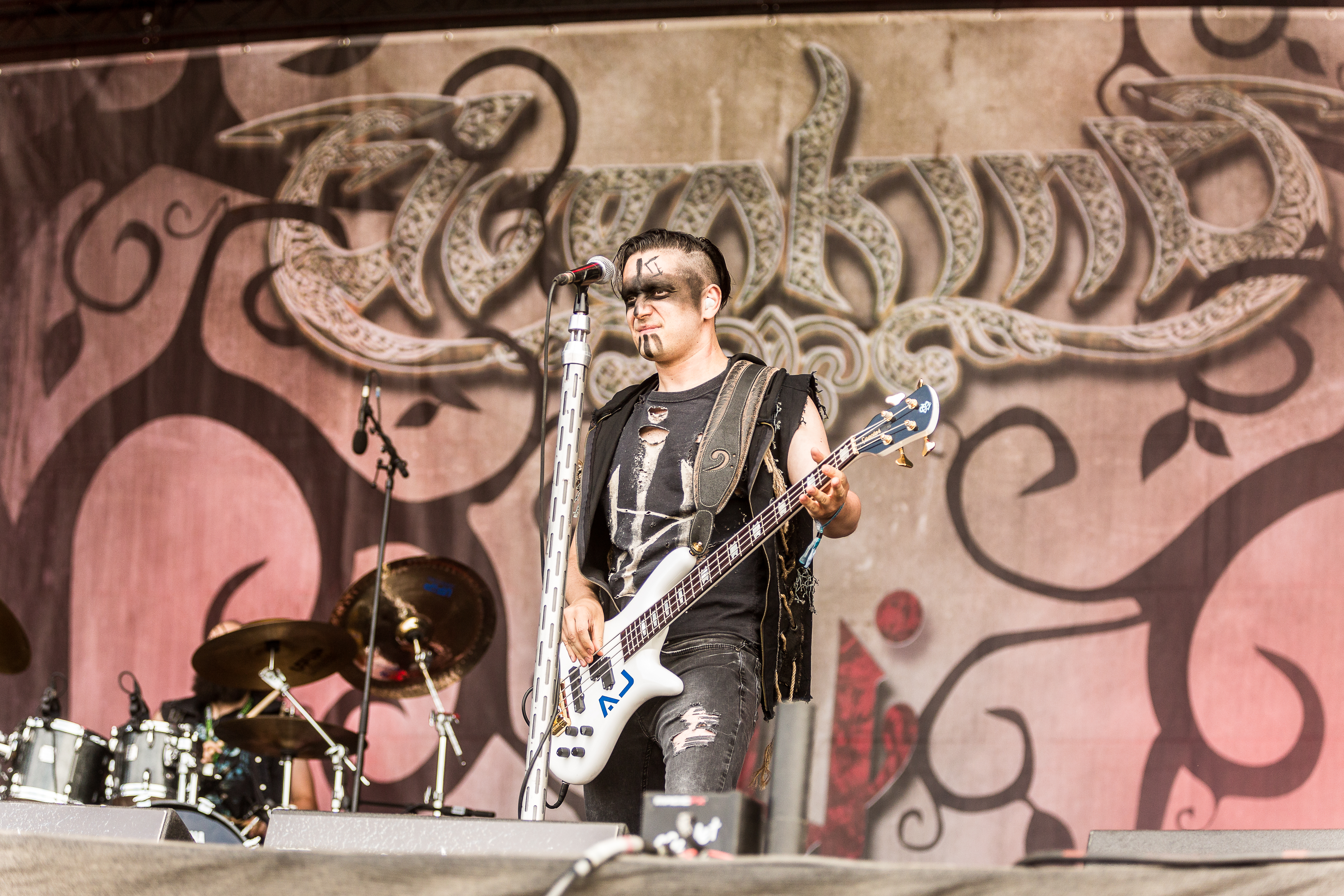
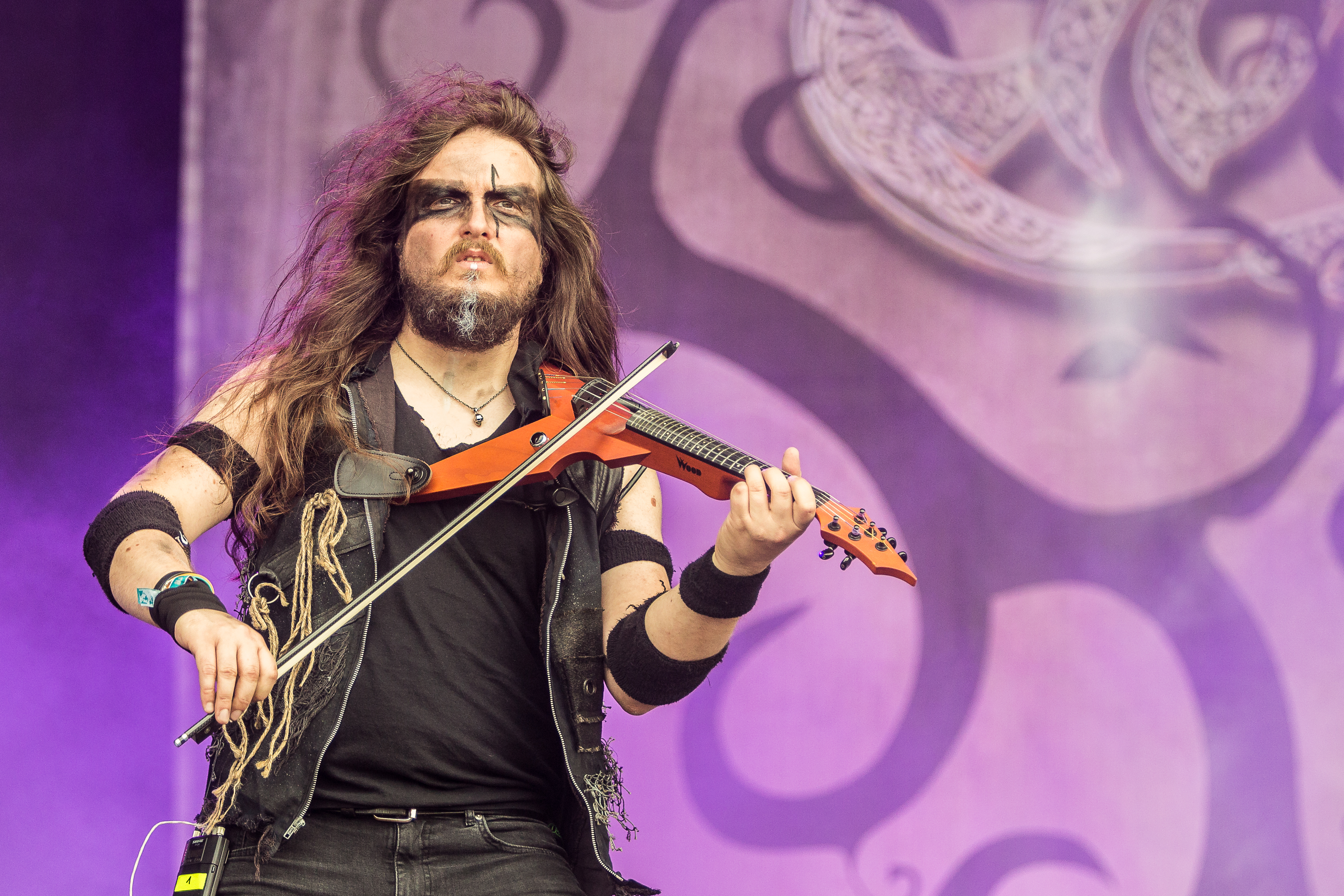
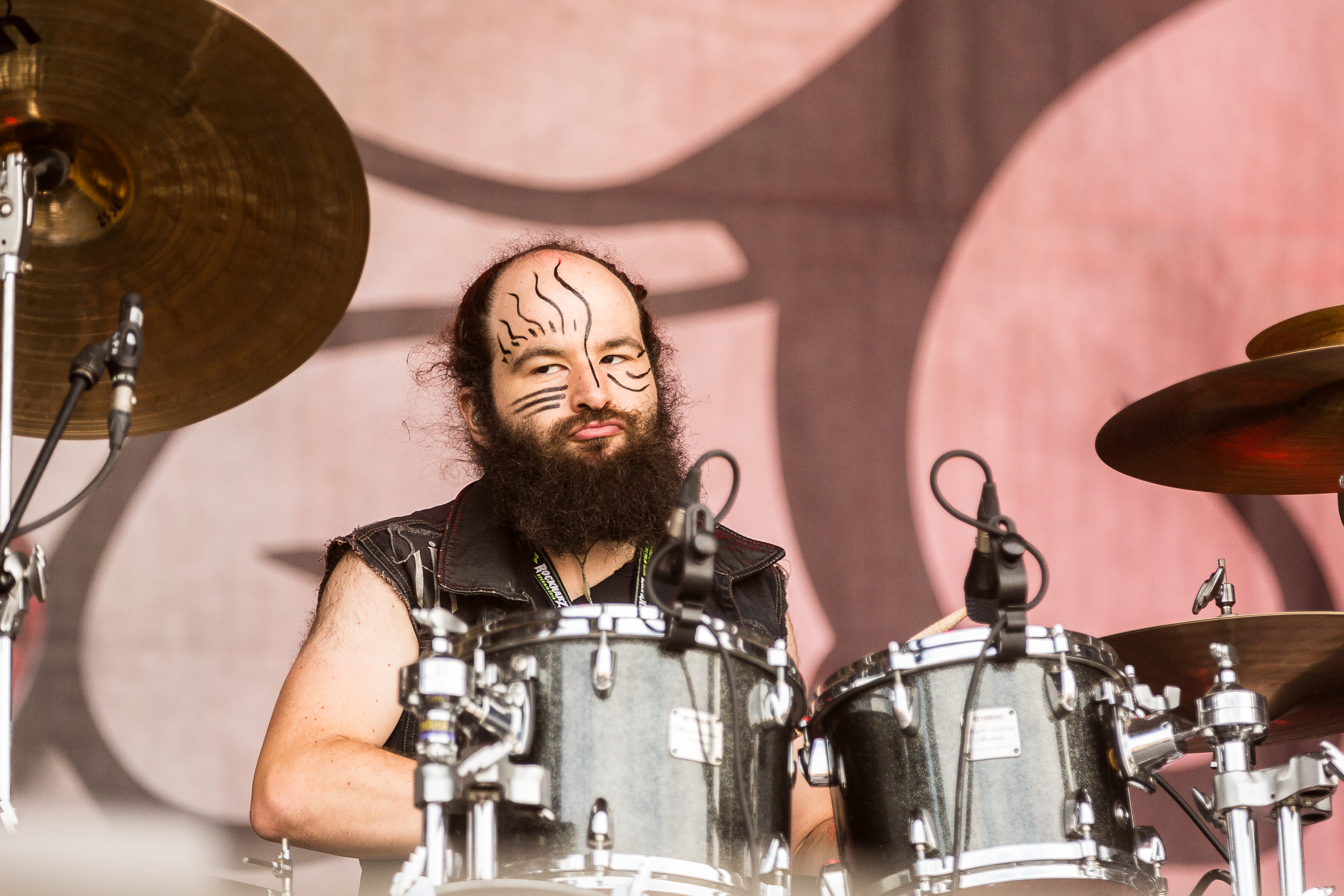
Current lineup, from left to right: singer Damnagoras, guitarists Rafahel and Aydan, bassist Jakob, violinist Lethien, and drummer Symohn

=== Current ===
- Federico "Aydan" Baston – guitars (1997–present)
- Davide "Damnagoras" Moras – vocals (1997–2002, 2004–present)
- Fabio "Lethien" Polo – violin (2009–present)
- Alessandro "Jakob" Jacobi – bass (2012–present)
- Simone "Symohn" Morettin – drums (2011–2017, 2022–present)
- Mattia "Headmatt" Carli – guitars (2022–present)

=== Former ===
- Massimo "Kleid" Bottiglieri – vocals (2002–2004)
- Jarpen – guitars, unclean vocals (1997–2005)
- Luca Luison – guitars (2005–2007)
- Raffaello "Rafahel" Indri – guitars (2007–2022)
- Sargon – bass (1997–1999)
- Gorlan – bass (2000–2011)
- Zender – drums (1997–2011)
- Marco "Lancs" Lanciotti – drums (2017–2022)
- Elyghen – violin (2002–2010)

Timeline

== Discography ==
=== Studio albums ===
- Heathenreel (2001)
- Wyrd (2004)
- The Winter Wake (2006)
- The Scythe (2007)
- Two Tragedy Poets (...and a Caravan of Weird Figures) (2008)
- Red Silent Tides (2010)
- Era (2012)
- The Pagan Manifesto (2014)
- Secrets of the Magick Grimoire (2017)
- Reader of the Runes
  - Divination (2019)
  - Rapture (2023)
  - Luna (2025)

=== EPs ===
- To Oak Woods Bestowed (demo) (2000)
- Rites of Disclosure (2026)

=== Singles/music videos ===
- The Divided Heart – 2007
- The Cabal – 2010
- Your Heroes Are Dead – 2011
- Poor Little Baroness (Lyric Video) – 2012
- The Loser – 2012
- Elvenlegions – 2014
- The Solitare (Lyric Video) – 2015
- Draugen's Maelstrom (Lyric Video) – 2017
- Invoking the Woodland Spirit – 2017
- The One We Shall Follow – 2018
- Under the Sign of a Black Star (Lyric Video) – 2019
- Silverseal – 2019
- Divination – 2019
- No Prayer for the Dying (Iron Maiden cover) – 2020
- The Moon and Magic – 2021
- Rapture – 2022
- The Hanging Tree (Lyric Video) – 2023
- Bride of Night – 2023
- Ethel (Lyric Video) – 2024
- Throes of Atonement (Visualizer Video) – 2024
- Luna – 2025
- Gone Epoch – 2025
- The Ghosting (Lyric Video) – 2025
