= The Road to Paradiso =

2006 compilation album by Epica

Compilation album by Epica
- Released: 4 May 2006
- Recorded: 2002–2006
- Genre: Symphonic metal
- Length: 56:20
- Label: Transmission

Epica chronology
Consign to Oblivion (2005)	The Road to Paradiso (2006)	The Divine Conspiracy (2007)

The Road to Paradiso is a book about the Dutch symphonic metal band Epica (written in both Dutch and English) which was accompanied by a compilation album of the same name. It was released on 4 May 2006, on the same night they performed at the venue Paradiso in Amsterdam. The title The Road to Paradiso was given to the project because the book contained the story of how Epica developed from their beginning days in 2002, until what they had become in 2006. The album also includes demo versions of three of their previous released songs, effectively giving insight into how their songs developed. The album includes four previously unreleased tracks: "The Fallacy", "Linger" (Piano version) (a different version of which appeared on the "Quietus" single), "Crystal Mountain" (orchestral version) (from the "Quietus" single) and "Purushayita" (a very different version of "Vengeance is Mine" from The Score – An Epic Journey album).

The release of the album and book was announced on 16 January 2006 on the official website of Epica. The band stated that they wanted this album and book "to be made for the fans, but also by the fans".

The album reached #46 on the Dutch album charts.

== Track listing ==
1. "Welcome to the Road of Paradiso (Caught in a Web)" – 4:37
2. "Making of Adyta" – 1:34
3. "Adyta" (demo version) – 1:23
4. "Making of Cry for the Moon" – 1:29
5. "Cry for the Moon" (demo version) – 6:43
6. "Making of Quietus" – 1:14
7. "Quietus" (demo version) – 3:41
8. "Quietus (Silent Reverie)" – 3:54
9. "The Fallacy" – 3:23
10. "Interview with Ad (on the live tracks)" – 0:32
11. "Solitary Ground" (live) – 4:05
12. "Blank Infinity" (live) – 4:04
13. "Mother of Light" (live) – 6:01
14. "Linger" (piano version) – 4:15
15. "Crystal Mountain" (orchestral version) – 5:01 (Death cover)
16. "Purushayita" – 6:20
