= The Scythe (album) =

Studio album by Elvenking
- Released: 14 September 2007 (Europe); 7 November 2007 (US)
- Genres: Folk metal; power metal; progressive metal
- Length: 55:19
- Labels: AFM (Europe); Candlelight (US)
- Producers: Damnagoras and Aydan

Elvenking chronology
The Winter Wake (2006)	The Scythe (2007)	Two Tragedy Poets (...And a Caravan of Weird Figures) (2008)

Professional ratings
Review scores
Source	Rating
AllMusic	3.0/5 stars
Metalreview.com	7/10
Metalstorm.net	6.8/10
Metalitalia.com	7.5/10

The Scythe is the fourth studio album by Italian folk metal band Elvenking. It was released on 14 September 2007 through AFM Records in all European countries and 7 November in the US by Candlelight Records.

This is the first concept album by Elvenking, with lyrics centered on the death of a beautiful woman along with themes of revenge and deceit. This is also illustrated in the video to "The Divided Heart".

== Track listing ==
All lyrics are written by Aydan and Damnagoras; all music is composed by Aydan and Damnagoras except "The Open Breach" by Jarpen.

No.	Title	Length
1.	"The Scythe"	5:36
2.	"Lost Hill of Memories"	4:58
3.	"Infection"	5:05
4.	"Poison Tears"	4:30
5.	"A Riddle of Stars"	5:22
6.	"Romance & Wrath"	8:14
7.	"The Divided Heart"	4:39
8.	"Horns Ablaze" (Digipak version bonus track)	4:21
9.	"Totentanz"	2:28
10.	"Death and the Suffering"	5:11
11.	"Dominhate"	8:57
12.	"The Open Breach" (Japanese bonus track)	4:55

Notes

- The digipak version also includes the video for the song "The Divided Heart"

== Personnel ==
- Damnagoras – vocals
- Aydan – guitars
- Gorlan – bass
- Zender – drums
- Elyghen – violin, keyboards

Additional musicians

- Mike Wead – 1st solo on "The Scythe", 2nd solo on "A Riddle of Stars"
- Laura De Luca – female vocals on "Romance & Wrath" and "Dominhate"
- Jared Shackleford – narration
- Mauro Bortolani – piano
- Isabella Tuni – female voice on "Romance & Wrath"
- Laura De Luca, Pauline Tacey, Claudio Coassin, Aydan – backing vocals
- Claudio Coassin, Damna, Aydan and Jarpen – shouts
- Elyghen – arrangement
- Eleonora Steffan – violin
- Valentina Mosca – violin
- Elyghen – viola
- Marco Balbinot – cello
