= The Winter Wake =

Studio album by Elvenking
- Released: 27 January 2006
- Recorded: Mauro Bortolani, Aydan and Damnagoras at Sherpa Studios, Italy
- Genre: Folk metal; power metal; symphonic metal
- Length: 51:46
- Label: AFM
- Producer: Damnagoras and Aydan

Elvenking chronology
| Wyrd (2004) | The Winter Wake (2006) | The Scythe (2007) |

Professional ratings
Review scores
| Source | Rating |
|---|---|
| AllMusic | 3.5/5 stars |
| Sputnikmusic | 5/5 stars |
| Metalreview | 7.7/10 stars |
| Metalstorm | 7.5/10 stars |

The Winter Wake is the third studio album by Italian folk metal band Elvenking. It features the return of original vocalist Damnagoras and the departure of guitarist Jarpen. The lyrical content of the album centers around fantasy, folklore, fairy tales, and feeling alone and being an outsider or an outcast as well as hints at the music industry with songs such as the Skyclad cover "Penny Dreadful".

== Track listing ==
All lyrics are written by Aydan, except where noted.

| No. | Title | Lyrics | Length |
|---|---|---|---|
| 1. | "Trows Kind" | | 5:57 |
| 2. | "Swallowtail" | Damnagoras | 4:26 |
| 3. | "The Winter Wake" (featuring Marcel Schirmer) | | 4:19 |
| 4. | "The Wanderer" | | 4:54 |
| 5. | "March of Fools" | | 5:46 |
| 6. | "On the Morning Dew" | | 3:30 |
| 7. | "Devil's Carriage" | Damnagoras | 4:04 |
| 8. | "Rats Are Following" | Aydan, Damnagoras | 4:37 |
| 9. | "Rouse Your Dream" | | 4:48 |
| 10. | "Neverending Nights" | Damnagoras | 7:01 |
| 11. | "Disillusion's Reel" | Damnagoras | 2:19 |
| Total length: | | | 51:46 |

Bonus tracks
| No. | Title | Lyrics | Length |
|---|---|---|---|
| 12. | "Penny Dreadful" (Skyclad cover; European bonus track) | | 3:11 |
| 13. | "Petalstorm" (Japanese bonus track) | Aydan, Damnagoras | 4:49 |

== Personnel ==
- Damnagoras – vocals, additional lead guitars on "Neverending Nights"
- Aydan – guitars, backing vocals
- Gorlan – bass guitar
- Elyghen – violin, keyboards
- Zender – drums

Additional musicians

- Marcel Schirmer (Destruction) – vocals on "The Winter Wake"
- Nino Laurenne (Thunderstone) – 2nd solo on "Trows Kind"
- Jarpen (after leaving) – 2nd solo on "The Winter Wake"
- Pauline Tacey – soprano vocals on "March of Fools" and "Disillusion's Reel"
- Laura De Luca – vocals on "On the Morning Dew"
- Isabella "Whisperwind" Tuni – fairy voice on "Trows Kind"
- Umberto Corazza – flutes
- Pauline Tacey, Laura De Luca, Giada Etro, Isabella Tuni, Claudio Coassin, Damnagoras, Aydan, Elyghen
- Arranged by Elyghen
- Eleonora Steffan – violin
- Attilio Zardini – violin
- Elyghen – viola
- Marco Balbinot – cello
