= HDK (band) =

Dutch metal music project

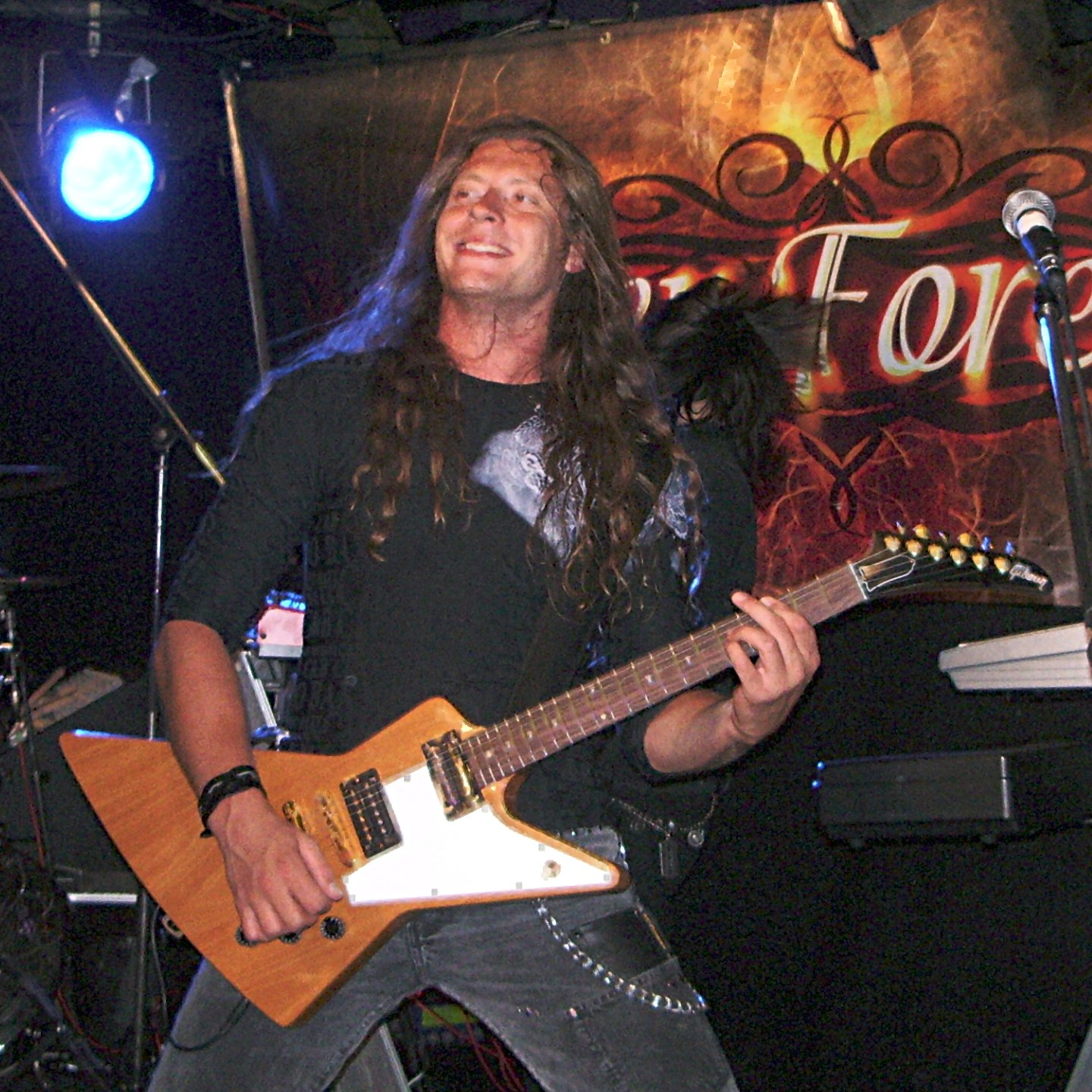

Background information
- Origin: Reuver, Netherlands
- Genres: Heavy metal; melodic death metal; thrash metal; progressive metal
- Years active: 2005–present
- Label: Season of Mist
- Members: Sander Gommans

HDK (Hate, Death, Kill) is a musical project of Dutch guitarist Sander Gommans, best known as a member, vocalist and one of the main composers of the now dissolved symphonic metal band After Forever.

== History ==
Sander Gommans founded the band as a side project of his career as guitarist and vocalist in the Dutch band After Forever in 2005, along with bass player Peter Vink and drummer Arien van Weesenbeek, who is now the drummer for Epica. Gommans' purpose was to produce music more extreme than After Forever's usual symphonic metal, which needed a different output. Gommans' activities as art teacher and member of After Forever and his poor health condition slowed down the creative process of the band, until 2008. With the interruption of After Forever activities, HDK was able to finally produce its first full-length album System Overload, which was released on 23 February 2009 on the label Season of Mist. The album featured many guest singers and instrumentalists.

In 2014, HDK released their second album called Serenades of the Netherworld, with a fixed line-up composed of Gommans on guitar and bass, Amanda Somerville and Geert Kroes on vocals, Koen Herfst on drums and Uri Dijk and Erik van Ittersum on keyboards, along with some guest instrumentalists.

On 21 September 2022, Geert Kroes died at the age of 42.

== Style ==
The music style is aggressive and amalgamates elements of classic metal, melodic death metal, and modern thrash metal, as well as other stylistic influences given by female vocals and progressive rock elements.

== Members ==
Current members

- Sander Gommans – growls, guitars, bass guitar

Guests

Vocalists

- Amanda Somerville – female vocals
- Andre Matos – clean male vocals
- Jos Severens – clean male vocals
- Patrick Savelkoul – screams, grunts
- Paul Niessen – raps
- Mike Scheijen – screams
- Geert Kroes – clean male vocals, growls

Instrumentalists

- Joost van den Broek – keyboards
- Arjen Anthony Lucassen – guitar solo
- Marcel Coenen – guitar solo
- Bastiaan Kuiper – guitar solo
- Ariën van Weesenbeek – drums
- Koen Herfst – drums
- Peter Vink – bass guitar
- Uri Dijk – keyboards
- Erik van Ittersum – keyboards

== Discography ==
=== Studio albums ===
- System Overload (2009)
- Serenades of the Netherworld (2014)

=== Singles & EP's ===
- Borderland (in collaboration with Magic-O-Metal) (2022)
- Human Error (in collaboration with Magic-O-Metal) (2023)
