= List of Avantasia band members =

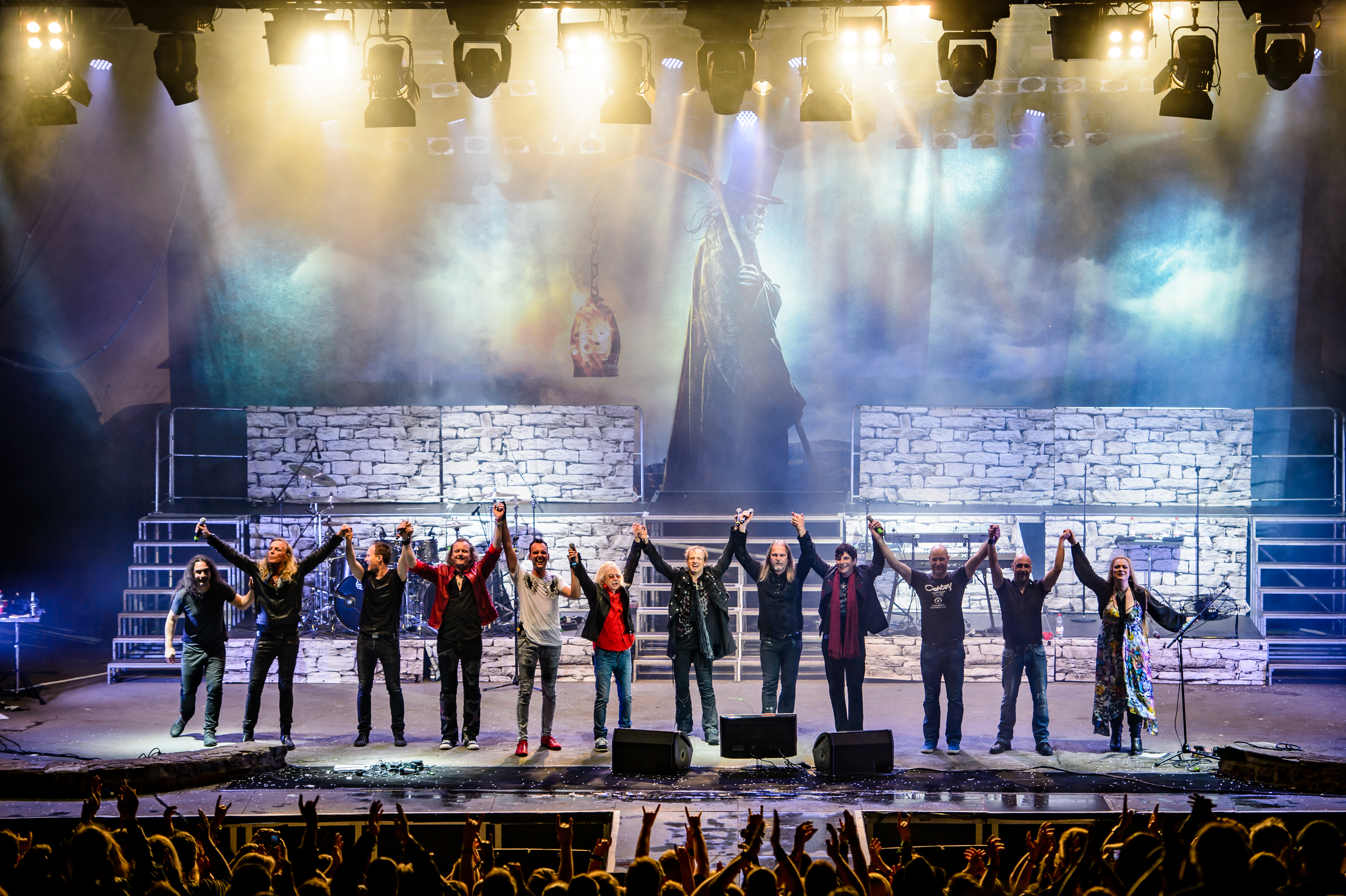
Avantasia; RockFels 2016 – Loreley

This is a list of the members of German supergroup rock opera project Avantasia.

== Ghostlights members ==
- Tobias Sammet
  - Lead vocals (2001–present)
  - Bass guitar (2007–present)
  - Keyboards (2001–2002)
- Sascha Paeth
  - Guitars (2007–present)
  - Producer (2007–present)
- Felix Bohnke
  - Drums (2010, 2015–present)
- Miro
  - Keyboards (2007–present)
  - Orchestration (2007–present)

== The Mystery of Time members ==
- Tobias Sammet
  - Lead vocals (2001–present)
  - Bass guitar (2007–present)
  - Keyboards (2001–2002)
- Sascha Paeth
  - Guitars (2007–present)
  - Producer (2007–present)
- Russell Gilbrook
  - Drums (2013–present)
- Miro
  - Keyboards (2007–present)
  - Orchestration (2007–present)

== The Wicked Trilogy members ==
- Tobias Sammet
  - Lead vocals (2001–present)
  - Bass guitar (2007–present)
  - Keyboards (2001–2002)
- Sascha Paeth
  - Guitars (2007–present)
  - Producer (2007–present)
- Eric Singer
  - Drums (2002, 2007–2010)
  - Vocals (2007)
- Miro
  - Keyboards (2007–present)
  - Orchestration (2007–present)

== The Metal Opera members ==
- Tobias Sammet
  - Lead vocals (2001–present)
  - Keyboards (2001–2002)
- Henjo Richter
  - Guitars (2001–2002, 2007–2010)
- Markus Grosskopf
  - Bass guitar (2001–2002)
- Alex Holzwarth
  - Drums (2001–2002, 2010)

== The Scarecrow World Tour (2008) ==
- Tobias Sammet – vocals
- Andre Matos – vocals
- Jørn Lande – vocals
- Kai Hansen – vocals (only shows in Europe)
- Bob Catley – vocals (only shows in Europe and Asia)
- Oliver Hartmann – vocals & guitars
- Amanda Somerville – vocals & backing vocals
- Cloudy Yang – backing vocals
- Sascha Paeth – guitars
- Robert Hunecke-Rizzo – bass
- Miro – keyboards
- Felix Bohnke – drums

== The Metal Opera Comes to Town Tour (2010) ==
- Tobias Sammet – vocals
- Michael Kiske – vocals
- Jørn Lande – vocals
- Bob Catley – vocals
- Kai Hansen – vocals & guitars
- Oliver Hartmann – vocals & guitars
- Amanda Somerville – vocals
- Sascha Paeth – guitars
- Miro – keyboards
- Robert Hunecke-Rizzo – bass
- Felix Bohnke – drums

== The Mystery World Tour (2013) ==
- Tobias Sammet – vocals
- Michael Kiske – vocals
- Bob Catley – vocals
- Ronnie Atkins – vocals (only shows in Europe and Japan)
- Eric Martin – vocals
- Thomas Rettke – vocals, backing vocals
- Oliver Hartmann – vocals, backing vocals, guitars
- Amanda Somerville – vocals, backing vocals
- Sascha Paeth – guitars, backing vocals
- Miro – keyboards, backing vocals
- Andre Neygenfind – bass, backing vocals
- Felix Bohnke – drums

== Ghostlights World Tour (2016) ==
- Tobias Sammet – vocals
- Michael Kiske – vocals
- Jørn Lande – vocals
- Bob Catley – vocals (only shows in Europe and Asia)
- Ronnie Atkins – vocals
- Eric Martin – vocals
- Herbie Langhans – vocals, backing vocals
- Oliver Hartmann – vocals, backing vocals, guitars
- Amanda Somerville – vocals, backing vocals
- Sascha Paeth – guitars, backing vocals
- Miro – keyboards, backing vocals
- Andre Neygenfind – bass, backing vocals
- Felix Bohnke – drums

== Moonglow World Tour (2019) ==
- Tobias Sammet – vocals
- Jørn Lande – vocals
- Bob Catley – vocals
- Ronnie Atkins – vocals
- Eric Martin – vocals
- Geoff Tate – vocals
- Herbie Langhans – vocals, backing vocals
- Adrienne Cowan – vocals, backing vocals
- Ina Morgan – backing vocals
- Oliver Hartmann – vocals, backing vocals, guitars
- Sascha Paeth – guitars, backing vocals
- Miro – keyboards, backing vocals
- Andre Neygenfind – bass, backing vocals
- Felix Bohnke – drums

== Moonflower World Tour (2022) ==
- Tobias Sammet – vocals
- Jørn Lande – vocals
- Bob Catley – vocals
- Ronnie Atkins – vocals
- Eric Martin – vocals
- Ralf Scheepers – vocals
- Herbie Langhans – vocals, backing vocals
- Adrienne Cowan – vocals, backing vocals
- Ina Morgan – backing vocals
- Oliver Hartmann – vocals, backing vocals, guitars
- Sascha Paeth – guitars, backing vocals
- Miro – keyboards, backing vocals
- Andre Neygenfind – bass, backing vocals
- Felix Bohnke – drums

== Here be Dragons Tour (2025) ==
- Tobias Sammet – vocals
- Tommy Karevik – vocals
- Ronnie Atkins – vocals
- Kenny Leckremo – vocals
- Eric Martin – vocals
- Herbie Langhans – vocals, backing vocals
- Adrienne Cowan – vocals, backing vocals
- Chiara Tricarico – vocals, backing vocals

== Vocalists ==
Vocalist	Associated bands	Avantasia	The Metal Opera	The Metal Opera Part II	Lost in Space Part I	Lost in Space Part II	The Scarecrow	The Wicked Symphony	Angel of Babylon	The Mystery of Time	Ghostlights	Moonglow	A Paranormal Evening with the Moonflower Society
Tobias Sammet	Edguy	all tracks	all tracks, except track 4 (Malleus Maleficarum)	all tracks	all tracks	all tracks	all tracks	all tracks	all tracks, except track 8 (Symphony of Life)	all tracks	all tracks	all tracks	all tracks
Michael Kiske	Helloween, Place Vendome, Kiske/Somerville, Unisonic	Reach Out for the Light	Reach Out for the Light, Breaking Away, Farewell, Avantasia, The Tower	The Seven Angels, No Return		Promised Land	The Scarecrow, Shelter from the Rain, What Kind of Love	Wastelands, Runaway Train	Stargazers	Where Clock Hands Freeze, Savior in the Clockwork, Dweller in a Dream	Ghostlights, Unchain the Light, Wake up to the Moon	Requiem for a Dream	The Inmost Light, Arabesque
David DeFeis	Virgin Steele	Final Sacrifice	Serpents in Paradise, The Tower	The Seven Angels, The Final Sacrifice									
Andre Matos	ex-Shaman, ex-Angra, ex-Viper, ex-Symfonia		Inside, Sign of the Cross, The Tower	The Seven Angels, No Return, Chalice of Agony					Blizzard On a Broken Mirror				
Ralf Zdiarstek			Malleus Maleficarum, The Glory of Rome	Memory				Black Wings					
Oliver Hartmann	ex-At Vance		The Glory of Rome, Sign of the Cross, The Tower	The Seven Angels			I Don't Believe in Your Love		Stargazers				
Kai Hansen	Helloween, Gamma Ray, Unisonic		Inside, Sign of the Cross	The Seven Angels, Chalice of Agony									
Rob Rock	ex-Axel Rudi Pell, ex-Warrior, Driver, Impellitteri		The Glory of Rome	The Seven Angels, Neverland									
Sharon den Adel	Within Temptation		Farewell	Into the Unknown							Isle of Evermore		
Timo Tolkki	ex-Stratovarius, ex-Revolution Renaissance, ex-Symfonia		The Tower										
Bob Catley	Magnum, ex-Hard Rain			The Looking Glass, In Quest for	The Story Ain't Over		Shelter from the Rain, Cry Just a Little	Runaway Train	Journey to Arcadia	The Great Mystery	A Restless Heart and Obsidian Skies, Wake up to the Moon	Lavender	The Moonflower Society
Jørn Lande	ex-Ark, ex-Masterplan, lead singer of Jorn				Another Angel Down	Promised Land	The Scarecrow, Another Angel Down, Devil in the Belfry	The Wicked Symphony, Runaway Train, Crestfallen, Forever is a Long Time	Stargazers, Angel of Babylon, Rat Race, Down in the Dark, Alone I Remember, Promised Land		Let the Storm Descend Upon You, Ghostlights, Lucifer, Wake up to the Moon	Book of Shallows, The Raven Child, The Piper at the Gates of Dawn	I Tame the Storm, Arabesque
Amanda Somerville	Aina, Kiske/Somerville, Trillium				Lost in Space, The Story Ain't Over	Lost in Space, Lost in Space	What Kind of Love, Lost in Space						
Eric Singer	Kiss, ex-Black Sabbath, ex-Alice Cooper				Ride the Sky								
Roy Khan	ex-Conception, ex-Kamelot						Twisted Mind						
Alice Cooper							The Toy Master						
Russell Allen	Symphony X, Adrenaline Mob							The Wicked Symphony, States of Matter	Stargazers, Journey to Arcadia				
Tim "Ripper" Owens	ex-Judas Priest, ex-Yngwie Malmsteen, ex-Iced Earth							Scales of Justice					
Klaus Meine	Scorpions							Dying for an Angel					
Cloudy Yang									Symphony of Life	Sleepwalking			
Jon Oliva	Savatage, Jon Oliva's Pain								Death is Just a Feeling				
Joe Lynn Turner	ex-Rainbow, ex-Deep Purple, ex-Yngwie Malmsteen									Spectres, The Watchmakers' Dream, Savior in the Clockwork, The Great Mystery			
Biff Byford	Saxon									Black Orchid, Savior in the Clockwork, The Great Mystery			
Ronnie Atkins	Pretty Maids									Invoke The Machine	Let the Storm Descend Upon You, Unchain the Light, Wake up to the Moon	Book of Shallows, Starlight, The Piper at the Gates of Dawn	Paper Plane
Eric Martin	Mr. Big									What's Left Of Me		The Piper at the Gates of Dawn, Maniac	Rhyme and Reason
Robert Mason	Warrant, Lynch Mob										Let the Storm Descend Upon You, Babylon Vampyres, Wake up to the Moon		
Dee Snider	Twisted Sister										The Haunting		
Herbie Langhans	Seventh Avenue										Draconian Love		
Marko Hietala	Nightwish, Tarot, Northern Kings, Raskasta Joulua, Sapattivuosi, Sinergy										Master of the Pendulum		
Geoff Tate	Operation: Mindcrime, ex-Queensrÿche										Seduction of Decay	Invincible, Alchemy, The Piper at the Gates of Dawn	Scars
Candice Night	Blackmore's Night											Moonglow	
Hansi Kürsch	Blind Guardian, Demons & Wizards											Book of Shallows, The Raven Child	
Mille Petrozza	Kreator, ex-Voodoocult											Book of Shallows	
Floor Jansen	Nightwish, Northward, Star One, ex-After Forever, ex-ReVamp												Kill the Pain Away, Misplaced Among the Angels
Ralf Scheepers	Primal Fear												The Wicked Rule the Night

== Musicians ==
Musician	Associated bands	Avantasia	The Metal Opera	The Metal Opera Part II	Lost in Space Part I	Lost in Space Part II	The Scarecrow	The Wicked Symphony	Angel of Babylon	The Mystery of Time	Ghostlights	Moonglow	A Paranormal Evening with the Moonflower Society
Tobias Sammet	Edguy	Keyboards (all)	Keyboards (all)	Keyboards (all); Bass (10)	Bass (all)	Bass (all)	Bass (all)	Bass (all)	Bass (all)	Bass (all)	Bass (all)	Bass (all)	Keyboards, bass (all)
Henjo Richter	Gamma Ray	Guitars (all)	Guitars (all)	Guitars (all)	Lead guitar (3)	Lead guitar (2, 3, 4)	Lead guitar (2, 3, 6, 7, 8)		Lead guitar (10)				
Markus Grosskopf	Helloween	Bass (all)	Bass (all)	Bass (all)									
Alex Holzwarth	Rhapsody of Fire, ex-Angra	Drums (all)	Drums (all)	Drums (all)				Drums (3, 7, 8, 10)	Drums (1, 2, 3, 11)				
Jens Ludwig	Edguy		Lead guitar (12, 13)	Lead guitar (5, 9)									
Timo Tolkki	ex-Stratovarius, ex-Revolution Renaissance, ex-Symfonia			Lead guitar (1, 10)									
Norman Meiritz			Acoustic guitar (6)	Rhythm guitar (10)									
Frank Tischer			Piano (11)	Piano (1, 4, 7)									
Sascha Paeth	ex-Heavens Gate, Aina				Guitars (all)	Guitars (all)	Guitars (all)	Guitars (all)	Guitars (all)	Guitars (all)	Guitars (all)	Guitars (all)	Guitars, bass (all)
Eric Singer	Kiss, ex-Black Sabbath, ex-Alice Cooper			Drums (10)	Drums (all)	Drums (all)	Drums (all)	Drums (2, 4, 6)	Drums (5, 7, 9, 10)				
Michael "Miro" Rodenberg	Aina, Kamelot				Keyboards (all)	Keyboards (all)	Keyboards (all)	Keyboards (all)	Keyboards (all except track 2)	Keyboards (all)	Keyboards (all)	Keyboards (all)	Keyboards (5, 11)
Kai Hansen	Helloween, Gamma Ray, Unisonic, ex-Iron Savior						Lead guitar (3)						
Rudolf Schenker	Scorpions						Lead guitar (10)						
Bruce Kulick	ex-Kiss, Grand Funk Railroad							Lead guitar (6, 11)	Lead guitar (5, 9, 11)	Lead guitar (3, 6, 10)	Lead guitar (9, 10, 12)		
Oliver Hartmann	ex-At Vance							Lead guitar (2, 8)	Lead guitar (1, 2, 3)	Lead guitar (4, 7)	Lead guitar (2, 5, 9, 11)	Lead guitar (4)	Lead guitar (4)
Felix Bohnke	Edguy							Drums (1, 5, 9, 11)	Drums (4, 6, 8)		Drums (all)	Drums (all)	Drums (all)
Jens Johansson	Stratovarius, ex-Yngwie Malmsteen								Keyboards (2)				
Eddy Wrapiprou	Edguy								Keyboards (all)				
Simon Oberender								Organ (11)	Organ (9)				
Russell Gilbrook	Uriah Heep									Drums (all)			
Arjen Anthony Lucassen	Ayreon, Star One, Guilt Machine, Ambeon, ex-Stream of Passion, ex-Vengeance, ex-Bodine									Lead guitar (2)			
Ferdy Doernberg	Axel Rudi Pell									Hammond Organ (2)			
