= Avantasia discography =

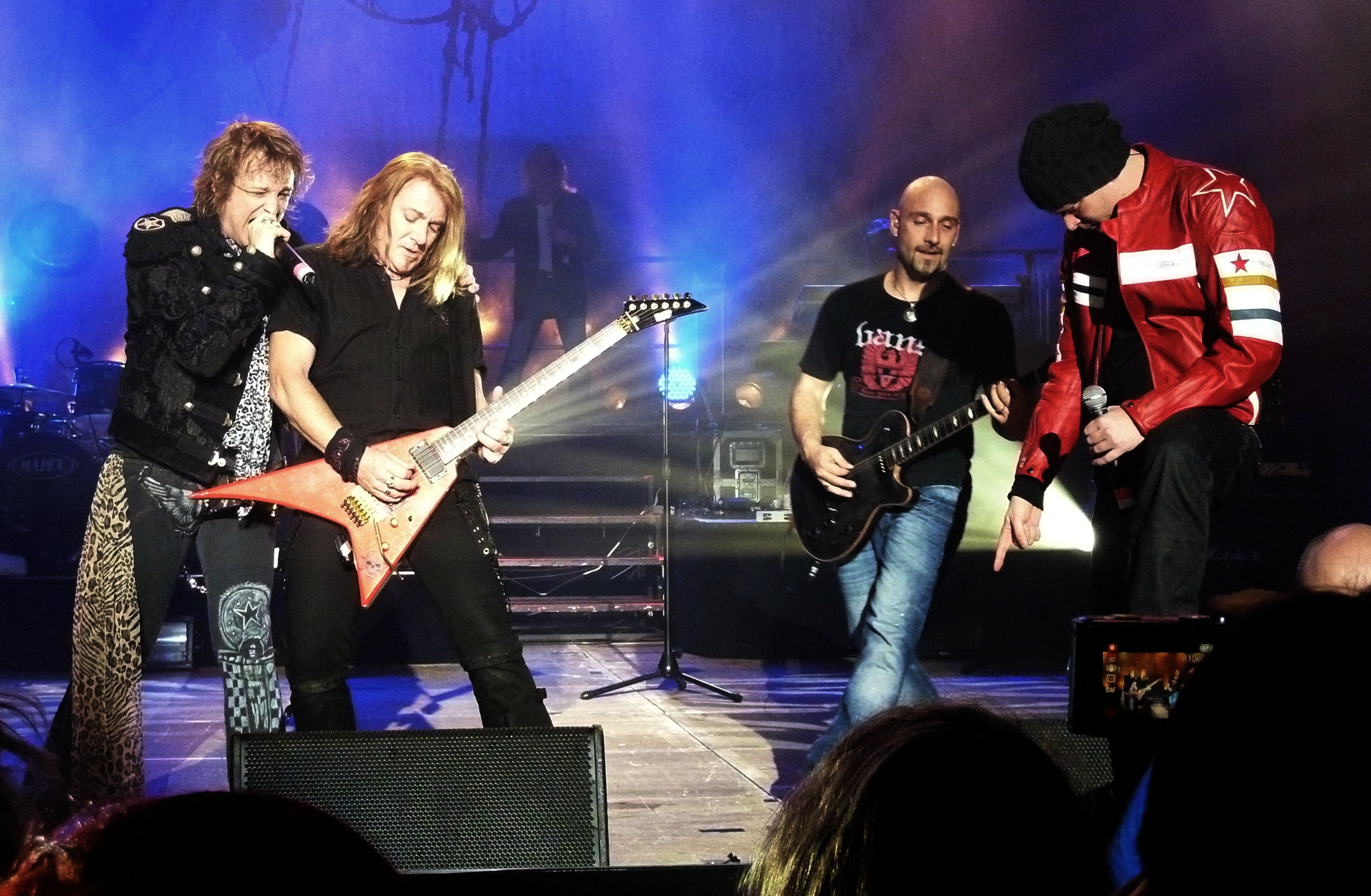
- Avantasia in concert in 2010
- Studio albums: 10
- EPs: 2
- Live albums: 1
- Compilation albums: 2
- Singles: 9
- Video albums: 1

This is the discography for German heavy metal band Avantasia.

== Albums ==
=== Studio albums ===
Title	Album details	Peak chart positions											Certificates
Title	Album details	GER	AUT	BEL (Fl)	BEL (Wa)	ESP	FIN	FRA	NL	NOR	SWE	SWI	Certificates
The Metal Opera	Released: 10 July 2001; Label: AFM Records; Formats: CD, LP, digital download	35	—	—	—	—	36	118	—	—	48	—	
The Metal Opera Part II	Released: 29 October 2002; Label: AFM Records; Formats: CD, LP, digital download	17	—	—	—	46	26	64	—	55	17	94	
The Scarecrow	Released: 5 February 2008; Label: Nuclear Blast; Formats: CD, LP, digital download	8	16	—	—	27	18	26	57	36	10	17	
The Wicked Symphony / Angel of Babylon	Released: 4 May 2010; Label: Nuclear Blast; Formats: CD, LP, digital download	2	9	—	—	32	18	74	—	22	14	7	
The Mystery of Time	Released: 30 April 2013; Label: Nuclear Blast; Formats: CD, LP, digital download	2	11	97	70	29	9	61	85	19	9	5	
Ghostlights	Released: 29 January 2016; Label: Nuclear Blast; Formats: CD, LP, digital download	2	10	44	70	19	11	68	48	17	7	8	CZ: Gold
Moonglow	Released: 15 February 2019; Label: Nuclear Blast; Formats: CD, LP, digital download	1	4	38	121	5	13	43	83	—	6	3	
A Paranormal Evening with the Moonflower Society	Released: 21 October 2022; Label: Nuclear Blast; Formats: CD, LP, digital download	3	7	68	87	16	13	103	52	48	10	4	
Here Be Dragons	Released: 28 February 2025; Label: Napalm Records; Formats: CD, LP, digital download	1	1	48	86	29	45	—	73	—	46	3	
"—" denotes a recording that did not chart or was not released in that territory.

=== Live albums ===
Title	Album details	Peak chart positions	Sales
Title	Album details	GER	Sales
The Flying Opera	Released: 18 March 2011; Label: Nuclear Blast; Formats: CD, LP, digital download	18	US: 430+

=== Video albums ===
Title	Album details	Peak chart positions		
Title	Album details	SWE	SWI	NL
The Flying Opera	Released: 18 March 2011; Label: Nuclear Blast; Formats: DVD, BD	1	3	30

== EPs ==
Title	Album details	Peak chart positions	
Title	Album details	GER	FR
Lost in Space Part I	Released: 19 November 2007; Label: Nuclear Blast; Formats: CD	9	66
Lost in Space Part II	Released: 19 November 2007; Label: Nuclear Blast; Formats: CD	—	69
"—" denotes a recording that did not chart or was not released in that territory.

== Singles ==
Title	Year	Peak chart positions
Title	Year	AUT
"Avantasia"	2000	—
"Lost in Space"	2007	48
"Carry Me Over"	2007	—
"Dying for an Angel"	2010	—
"Sleepwalking"	2013	—
"Mystery of a Blood Red Rose"	2016	—
"The Raven Child"	2018	—
"Moonglow"	2019	—
"The Inmost Light"	2022	—
"Creepshow"	2024	—
"Against the Wind"	2025	—
"The Witch"	2025	—
"—" denotes a recording that did not chart or was not released in that territory.

== Compilation albums ==
Title	Album details
Lost in Space Part I & II	Released: 2008
The Metal Opera: Pt 1 & 2 – Gold Edition	Released: 2008
