= The Metal Opera: Pt 1 & 2 – Gold Edition =

Box set by Avantasia
- Released: March 6, 2008
- Recorded: 2000–2001
- Genres: Symphonic metal, power metal
- Length: 1:58:25 (each album lasts 59:12)
- Label: AFM Records
- Producers: Tobias Sammet; Norman Meiritz

Avantasia chronology
| The Scarecrow (2008) | The Metal Opera: Pt 1 & 2 – Gold Edition (2008) | The Wicked Symphony (2010) |

The Metal Opera: Pt 1 & 2 – Gold Edition is a box set by German band Avantasia, released through the band's former label AFM Records on March 6, 2008. The set contains Avantasia's first two albums (The Metal Opera and The Metal Opera Part II) on two gold CDs, a 44-page booklet with the storyline, rare photos, liner notes, and an interview with project mastermind Tobias Sammet; all inside a luxury leather box.

== Track listing ==
=== CD 1 ===
1. Prelude
2. Reach Out for the Light
3. Serpents in Paradise
4. Malleus Maleficarum
5. Breaking Away
6. Farewell
7. The Glory of Rome
8. In Nomine Patris
9. Avantasia
10. A New Dimension
11. Inside
12. Sign of the Cross
13. The Tower
14. Avantasia (bonus radio single)

=== CD 2 ===
1. The Seven Angels
2. No Return
3. The Looking Glass
4. In Quest for
5. The Final Sacrifice
6. Neverland
7. Anywhere
8. Chalice of Agony
9. Memory
10. Into the Unknown
11. Sign of the Cross (Live bonus track) – Audio
12. Sign of the Cross (Live bonus track) – Video

== Personnel (The Avantasians) ==
- Tobias Sammet – (bass, keyboards, vocals)
- Henjo Richter – (guitar)
- Markus Grosskopf – (bass)
- Alex Holzwarth – (drums)
- Michael Kiske – (vocals)
- Andre Matos – (vocals)
- Bob Catley – (vocals)
- Kai Hansen – (vocals)
- David DeFeis – (vocals)
- Rob Rock – (vocals)
- Oliver Hartmann – (vocals)
- Sharon den Adel – (vocals)
- Ralf Zdiarstek – (vocals)
- Timo Tolkki – (guitar, vocals)
- Jens Ludwig – (guitar)
- Norman Meiritz – (guitar)
- Frank Tischer – (keyboards)
