= Lost in Space (disambiguation) =

Lost in Space is a science fiction/fantasy TV series that ran on CBS from 1965 to 1968.

Lost in Space may also refer to:

== Film and television ==
- Lost in Space (film), a 1998 film based on the 1965 TV series
- Lost in Space (1972 TV film), an animated television cartoon based on the 1965 TV series
- Lost in Space (2018 TV series), a remake of the 1965 TV series

=== Television episodes ===
- "Gets Lost in Space", The Magic School Bus season 1, episode 1, 1994
- "Izzy Lost in Space", Popples (2015) season 2, episode 4a, 2016
- "Lost in Space", American Dad! season 9, episode 18, 2013
- "Lost in Space, Part 1" and "Lost in Space, Part 2", Family Matters season 9, episodes 21–22, 1998
- "Lost in Space", Lavender Castle episode 17, 1999
- "Lost in Space", PJ Masks season 4, episode 18b, 2021
- "Lost in Space", Pocoyo series 2, episode 21, 2006
- "Lost in Space", Space Island One season 2, episode 11, 1998
- "Lost in Space", The Apprentice (American) season 4, episode 5, 2005
- "Lost in Space", The Cape (1996) episode 7, 1996
- "Lost in Space", The Eggs series 4, episode 5, 2005
- "Lost in Space", The Raggy Dolls series 5, episode 4, 1990
- "Lost in Space", Z.O.E. Dolores, I episode 9, 2021

== Literature ==
- Lost in Space (comics), a 1991 comic book series based on the TV series
- Lost in Space (1967 novelization), by Ted White (as "Ron Archer") and Dave Van Arnam, a novelization of the 1960s TV show
- Lost in Space, a 1959 science fiction novel by George O. Smith
- Lost in Space, a 1998 novel by Joan D. Vinge

== Music ==
=== Albums ===
- Black Elvis/Lost in Space, a 1999 album by Kool Keith
- Lost in Space (Jonzun Crew album), 1983
- Lost in Space (Aimee Mann album), 2002, or its title track
- Lost in Space Part I, a 2007 EP by Avantasia
- Lost in Space Part II, a 2007 EP by Avantasia
- Lost in Space Part I & II, a 2008 album by Avantasia
- Lost in Space (OuterSpace album), 2016
- Lost in Space, a 2006 boxed set by Radio Massacre International

=== Songs ===
- "Lost in Space" (Lighthouse Family song), 1997
- "Lost in Space" (Apollo 440 song), 1998
- "Lost in Space" (Electrasy song), 1998
- "Lost in Space", a 1980 song by Atomic Rooster from Atomic Rooster
- "Lost in Space", a 1980 song by Neil Young from Hawks & Doves
- "Lost in Space", a 1998 song by Apollo 440 from the Lost in Space soundtrack
- "Lost in Space", a 1999 song by Fountains of Wayne from Utopia Parkway
- "Lost in Space", a 1999 song by the Misfits from Famous Monsters
- "Lost in Space", a 2008 song by Avantasia from The Scarecrow
- "Lost in Space", a 2017 song by Tuna from TunaPark
- “Lost in Space”, a 2024 song by Foster the People

== See also ==
- Lost in the Stars (disambiguation)
