= Avantasia (disambiguation) =

Avantasia is a symphonic metal project by Tobias Sammet.

Avantasia may also refer to:

- Avantasia (song), a single by the band
- Avantasia (story), a story composed as metal album by Tobias Sammet's Avantasia
