= Lost in Space Part I & II =

Lost in Space Part 1 & 2

Compilation album by Avantasia
- Released: 2008
- Recorded: 2006–2007
- Genres: Hard rock, symphonic metal
- Length: 47:53
- Label: Nuclear Blast
- Producers: Sascha Paeth & Tobias Sammet

Avantasia chronology
The Metal Opera: Pt 1 & 2 - Gold Edition (2008)	Lost in Space Part 1 & 2 (2008)	The Wicked Symphony (2010)

Lost in Space Part 1 & 2 is a compilation album by German band Avantasia, released in 2008. The album contains tracks from Avantasia's EPs Lost in Space Part I and Lost in Space Part II and an expanded version of the title-song, featuring Michael Kiske.

== Track listing ==
No.	Title	Length
1.	"Lost In Space"	3:52
2.	"Lay All Your Love on Me" (ABBA cover)	4:23
3.	"Another Angel Down"	5:42
4.	"The Story Ain't Over"	4:59
5.	"Return To Avantasia"	0:47
6.	"Ride The Sky" (Lucifer's Friend cover)	2:55
7.	"Promised Land"	4:52
8.	"Dancing with Tears in My Eyes" (Ultravox cover)	3:53
9.	"Scary Eyes"	3:32
10.	"In My Defence" (Freddie Mercury cover)	3:58
11.	"Lost In Space" (Alive at Gatestudio)	4:36
12.	"Lost In Space" (Extended Version)	5:08

== Notes ==
- Track 1 originally from Lost in Space Part I and Lost in Space Part II
- Tracks 2 through 6 originally from Lost in Space Part I
- Tracks 7 through 11 originally from Lost in Space Part II
- Track 12 originally exclusive for iTunes

== Personnel ==
- Tobias Sammet - Lead vocals, bass
- Sascha Paeth - Rhythm guitars, lead guitars (Tracks 1−2, 4−6, 10−12)
- Eric Singer - Drums, vocals (Track 6)
- Michael "Miro" Rodenberg - Keyboards, orchestration

=== Guest vocalists ===
- Jørn Lande (Tracks 3, 7)
- Bob Catley (Track 4)
- Amanda Somerville (Tracks 1, 4, 10)
- Michael Kiske (Track 7, 12)

=== Guest musicians ===
- Henjo Richter - Lead guitars (Tracks 3, 7−9)
