= Moonglow (Avantasia album) =

Studio album by Avantasia
- Released: 15 February 2019
- Studios: Pathway Studio and GateStudio, Wolfsburg, Germany; Madhat2, Birmingham, UK; Chefrock-Studio, Hamburg, Germany; Klangetage, Frankfurt, Germany; Cove City Sound Studios, New York, New York, US; Studio 69, San Francisco, California, US; Twilight Hall Studio, Grefrath, Germany; Hansen Studios, Ribe, Denmark
- Genre: Symphonic power metal
- Length: 66:45 (standard edition); 70:30 (limited edition)
- Labels: Nuclear Blast (International edition); Chaos Reigns (Japanese edition)
- Producers: Sascha Paeth; Tobias Sammet

Avantasia chronology
Ghostlights (2016)	Moonglow (2019)	A Paranormal Evening with the Moonflower Society (2022)

Singles from Moonglow
- 1. "The Raven Child" Released: 14 December 2018; 2. "Moonglow" Released: 25 January 2019

Moonglow is the eighth full-length album by Tobias Sammet's German metal opera project Avantasia. It was released on 15 February 2019 through Nuclear Blast. As with previous Avantasia projects, the album features extensive collaborations with returning and new guest vocalists. It features 11 tracks (12 including its bonus track) and was supported by a world tour.

== Background and composition ==
Following the Ghostlights World Tour, Tobias Sammet felt exhausted and decided to take a break. He started to write songs for what would maybe become a solo album, but he realized the songs sounded like Avantasia and decided to write a follow-up to the 2016 album. Unlike previous releases, he did not have a deadline for Moonglow.

Sammet commented that he believes Moonglow is the most "adorned and detailed album we've ever produced", including "Celtic elements, world music elements, big choirs, atmospheric stuff, [and] amazing guest vocal performances". In another interview, he added that the record would contain "great vocal performances, great songs, epic stuff, fantastic stuff, diverse stuff... world music, power metal, pop... everything." Part of the album was written and recorded in England, a country Sammet considers to be highly inspiring for him.

The album marks Hansi Kürsch's and Candice Night's first guest performances on an Avantasia album. Sammet first wanted to have Kürsch sing in The Metal Opera, but wasn't able to do so due to scheduling conflicts. When he wrote "Moonglow", he didn't initially have Night in mind, but when he tried to think of someone to sing on the track, she seemed the ideal name.

=== Title and theme ===
Inspiration for the album title came from Sammet's fascination for the Moon. The story follows a nocturnal creature struggling to cope with the reality of boldness and beauty and ends up resorting to the darkness of the moonglow to hide itself from the world.

Lyrics deal with themes such as adjustment and non-adjustment, expectations, convictions and feeling out of place and fall within the Victorian gothic and dark romanticism genres.

=== Artwork ===
The album cover is influenced by Tim Burton; it was created by Swedish painter Alexander Jansson based on what Sammet told him about the character's story.

== Critical reception ==
Professional ratings
Review scores
Source	Rating
laut.de	4/5 stars
Metal.de	10/10
Metal Hammer	6/7
Metal Storm	8.1/10
sputnikmusic	3.7/5
Ultimate Guitar Archive	9/10

The album received highly positive reviews. Metal.de gave it a perfect score (10/10), calling the album "Opulent, aber nicht überzeichnet" ("opulent, but not over the top") and praising "The Raven Child" as "a track that will still be celebrated in 100 years".

The German edition of Metal Hammer was also highly praising of the album, calling it "another masterpiece after Ghostlights".

== Track listing ==
All songs are written by Tobias Sammet, except "Maniac" by Dennis Matkosky and Michael Sembello.

No.	Title	Guest vocalist(s)	Length
1.	"Ghost in the Moon"		9:51
2.	"Book of Shallows"	Hansi Kürsch, Ronnie Atkins, Jørn Lande, Mille Petrozza	5:00
3.	"Moonglow"	Candice Night	3:56
4.	"The Raven Child"	Kürsch, Lande	11:16
5.	"Starlight"	Atkins	3:38
6.	"Invincible"	Geoff Tate	3:07
7.	"Alchemy"	Tate	7:28
8.	"The Piper at the Gates of Dawn"	Atkins, Lande, Eric Martin, Bob Catley, Tate	7:20
9.	"Lavender"	Catley	4:30
10.	"Requiem for a Dream"	Michael Kiske	6:08
11.	"Maniac" (Michael Sembello cover)	Martin	4:31
Total length:			66:45

Limited edition bonus track
No.	Title	Length
12.	"Heart" (bonus track)	3:45
Total length:		70:30

== Personnel ==
Adapted from the album's booklet, Nuclear Blast and Blabbermouth.net.

Avantasia

- Tobias Sammet – lead vocals, additional keyboard, bass guitar
- Sascha Paeth – guitar, bass guitar, mixing
- Michael Rodenberg – keyboard, piano, orchestration, mastering
- Felix Bohnke – drums

Guest vocalists

- Ronnie Atkins
- Jørn Lande
- Eric Martin
- Geoff Tate
- Michael Kiske
- Bob Catley
- Candice Night
- Hansi Kürsch
- Mille Petrozza

Additional musicians

- Nadia Birkenstock – Celtic Harp
- Oliver Hartmann – additional lead guitar on track 4 & backing vocals
- Herbie Langhans, Billy King, Bridget Fogle, Lerato Sebele, Alvin Le-Bass, Stokely Van Daal – backing vocals

== Charts ==
=== Weekly charts ===
Chart (2019)	Peak position
Austrian Albums (Ö3 Austria)	4
Belgian Albums (Ultratop Flanders)	38
Belgian Albums (Ultratop Wallonia)	121
Czech Albums (ČNS IFPI)	8
Dutch Albums (Album Top 100)	83
Finnish Albums (Suomen virallinen lista)	13
French Albums (SNEP)	43
German Albums (Offizielle Top 100)	1
Italian Albums (FIMI)	31
Japanese Albums (Oricon)	48
Scottish Albums (Official Charts)	9
Spanish Albums (Promusicae)	5
Swedish Albums (Sverigetopplistan)	6
Swiss Albums (Schweizer Hitparade)	3
UK Albums (Official Charts)	38
UK Independent Albums (Official Charts)	2
UK Rock & Metal Albums (Official Charts)	1

=== Year-end charts ===
Chart (2019)	Position
German Albums (Offizielle Top 100)	68
