= Ghostlights =

Studio album by Avantasia
- Released: 29 January 2016
- Recorded: October 2014 – November 2015
- Studios: Gatestudio, Wolfsburg, Germany
- Genre: Symphonic power metal
- Length: 70:03
- Labels: Nuclear Blast (International release); Avalon (Japanese release)
- Producers: Sascha Paeth; Tobias Sammet

Avantasia chronology
| The Mystery of Time (2013) | Ghostlights (2016) | Moonglow (2019) |

Singles from Ghostlights
- 1. "Mystery of a Blood Red Rose" Released: 11 December 2015; 2. "Draconian Love" Released: 12 May 2016

Ghostlights is the seventh full-length album by Tobias Sammet's German metal opera project Avantasia. It was released on 29 January 2016. The opening track and first single "Mystery of a Blood Red Rose" was a candidate for the German representative at the Eurovision Song Contest 2016, along with nine other songs. The Digibook edition of the album included a bonus track and a bonus CD entitled Avantasia Live, which featured songs recorded mainly during Avantasia's 2014 performance at Wacken Open Air Festival.

Ghostlights scored the highest positions of any Avantasia release in several international music charts and marks the second time Avantasia has entered the US Billboard 200 albums chart.

The plot of the album concludes the story started on The Mystery of Time. Musically, it shows a darker and more theatrical tone than its predecessor, which Sammet claims to have been spontaneous, not planned.

== Background and concept ==
In 2014, Tobias Sammet stated that The Mystery of Time hinted at a sequel and the details to that sequel were announced in November 2015.

Unlike The Wicked Trilogy, which spawned three different albums, Ghostlights concludes the plot started on the previous album. The story follows the protagonist as he continues his journey with a group of scientists willing to find a way to align everybody's personality so they can understand each other and make the world a better place. Soon, the protagonist realizes aligning people is also a way of having control over them. Each song of the album represents a different station of the protagonist's journey. As Sammet explains, "It's a journey where he is looking for answers for some questions about his own existence and that leaves its mark on his philosophical worldview as well. Those twelve songs represent key moments on this journey and then it's done." He left an open ending "so that people can think about the things that happen in the story. You should be able to interpret it for yourself in the end."

Regarding the album's title, Sammet commented:

[...] the whole concept of this album deals with questionable ideals you have in life. It depends on which philosophy of life you have. Such ideals can be very different from each other. And it's about distractions to find cross-fires on the way to find out what you really want from life.

== Song information ==
The opening track and single "Mystery of a Blood Red Rose" was intended to have Meat Loaf as a lead singer, and his management was initially positive about having him perform on the album, but for unknown reasons they ultimately declined.

Describing the second and longest track "Let the Storm Descend Upon You", one of the last to be written for the album, Sammet commented:

[...] it's a big sounding arrangement with a lot of things that do not make sense according to the book of rules on how to compose a song. It's not very reasonable to start a song with a one minute intro, and then do a second overture, and have the first chorus after three-and-a-half minutes, but I don't think you perceive it as something that doesn't make sense. The whole song just developed.

After "The Haunting" had been written, Sammet was thinking of who could be the guest singer for it, and it had to be someone "who would be both theatrical actor, but at the same time dramatic vocalist and the song was very very eery [sic]. And I imagined somebody who should sound like a crossing between something very flamboyant and the Child Catcher in Chitty Chitty Bang Bang". He thought of Dee Snider after exploring his record collection, though he considered him a non-obvious choice due to the song being very different from "We're Not Gonna Take It" and "I Wanna Rock".

Sammet describes the early version of "Seduction of Decay" as "an epic heavy metal version of 'Black Dog'" meant for a singer like the young Robert Plant. The song also reminded him of Rage for Order-era Queensrÿche, so he decided to invite Geoff Tate, who accepted.

Sammet compares the track "Draconian Love" to The Metal Opera's "Avantasia" and The Wicked Symphony's "Dying for an Angel". Herbie Langhans, who guest performs as co-lead singer, sung his parts an octave lower than Sammet at Sascha Paeth's suggestion, so that their voices sound more different from each other. Sammet acknowledges that the result has been labeled "gothic" by some.

== Critical reception ==
Professional ratings
Review scores
| Source | Rating |
|---|---|
| AntiHero Magazine | 9/10 stars |
| Metal Hammer (de) | 6/7 stars |
| Metal Storm | 8.2/10 |
| Myglobalmind Online Magazine | 10/10 stars |

The reviewer for the Myglobalmind Online Magazine wrote that Ghostlights was heavier, more mysterious and darker than the previous album The Mystery of Time. He also lauded the sound production and arrangements by Sasha Paeth which underlined singer Tobias Sammet's vocals. A review by the AntiHero Magazine found that the album was one of Avantasia's "strongest releases to date" and that it featured the darkest atmosphere Sammet had created so far. The German edition of Metal Hammer lauded the homogenous songwriting and wrote that Ghostlights came partially close to Avantasia's early releases like The Metal Opera Part I and II as well as early Edguy albums. The Sonic Seducer's reviewer wrote that the album had "no musical limits" and that all guest singers harmonized well with Sammet's vocals.

== Track listing ==
All tracks are written by Tobias Sammet.

| No. | Title | Guest vocalist(s) | Length |
|---|---|---|---|
| 1. | "Mystery of a Blood Red Rose" | | 3:51 |
| 2. | "Let the Storm Descend Upon You" | Jørn Lande ("Temptation"), Ronnie Atkins ("Magician"), Robert Mason ("Scientist I") | 12:09 |
| 3. | "The Haunting" | Dee Snider ("Nightmare") | 4:42 |
| 4. | "Seduction of Decay" | Geoff Tate ("Scientist II") | 7:18 |
| 5. | "Ghostlights" | Michael Kiske ("Mystic"), Lande | 5:43 |
| 6. | "Draconian Love" | Herbie Langhans ("Eclipse") | 4:58 |
| 7. | "Master of the Pendulum" | Marko Hietala ("The Watchmaker") | 5:01 |
| 8. | "Isle of Evermore" | Sharon den Adel ("Muse") | 4:28 |
| 9. | "Babylon Vampyres" | Mason | 7:09 |
| 10. | "Lucifer" | Lande | 3:48 |
| 11. | "Unchain the Light" | Atkins, Kiske | 5:03 |
| 12. | "A Restless Heart and Obsidian Skies" | Bob Catley ("Spirit"), den Adel | 5:53 |
| Total length: | | | 70:03 |

Digibook edition bonus track

| No. | Title | Guest vocalist(s) | Length |
|---|---|---|---|
| 13. | "Wake up to the Moon" | Atkins, Kiske, Lande, Catley, Mason | 4:43 |
| Total length: | | | 74:46 |

- Sammet sings the part of "Aaron" throughout.

The Digibook edition bonus disc – Avantasia Live

All tracks are written by Tobias Sammet.

| No. | Title | Guest vocalist(s) | Length |
|---|---|---|---|
| 1. | "Spectres" | | 6:04 |
| 2. | "Invoke the Machine" | Atkins | 5:35 |
| 3. | "The Story Ain't Over" | Catley | 4:45 |
| 4. | "Prelude" | | 1:24 |
| 5. | "Reach Out for the Light" | Kiske | 8:04 |
| 6. | "Avantasia" | Kiske | 5:16 |
| 7. | "What's Left of Me" | Eric Martin | 5:55 |
| 8. | "Dying for an Angel" | Martin | 4:58 |
| 9. | "Twisted Mind" | Atkins, Martin | 6:29 |
| 10. | "The Watchmakers' Dream" | Oliver Hartmann | 4:47 |
| 11. | "Another Angel Down" | Lande | 5:30 |
| Total length: | | | 58:47 |

- Tracks 1–9 recorded at Wacken Open Air 2014, track 10 recorded at Masters Of Rock 2013, track 11 recorded at Wacken Open Air 2008.
- The Deluxe Edition Book of the album includes the two CDs of the Digibook edition, a third CD with instrumental versions of all the tracks (except the bonus one) and a 68-page photo book.

== Personnel ==
Adapted from the album credits.

- Tobias Sammet – lead vocals on all tracks, additional keyboards and bass
- Sascha Paeth – lead guitar (on tracks 1, 3–4, 6–8, 13), rhythm guitar, bass, additional keyboards, engineering and mixing
- Michael Rodenberg – orchestration, keyboards, mastering
- Felix Bohnke – drums
- Cloudy Yang – backing vocals

Guest instrumentalists

- Bruce Kulick – lead guitar on tracks 9–10, 12
- Oliver Hartmann – lead guitar on tracks 2, 5, 9, 11

Guest vocalists

- Jørn Lande
- Michael Kiske
- Dee Snider
- Geoff Tate
- Marko Hietala
- Sharon den Adel
- Bob Catley
- Ronnie Atkins
- Robert Mason
- Herbie Langhans

== Charts ==
=== Weekly charts ===
| Chart (2016) | Peak position |
|---|---|
| Austrian Albums (Ö3 Austria) | 10 |
| Belgian Albums (Ultratop Flanders) | 44 |
| Belgian Albums (Ultratop Wallonia) | 70 |
| Canadian Albums (Billboard) | 6 |
| Czech Albums (ČNS IFPI) | 2 |
| Dutch Albums (Album Top 100) | 48 |
| Finnish Albums (Suomen virallinen lista) | 11 |
| French Albums (SNEP) | 68 |
| German Albums (Offizielle Top 100) | 2 |
| Greek Albums (IFPI) | 32 |
| Hungarian Albums (MAHASZ) | 18 |
| Italian Albums (FIMI) | 33 |
| Norwegian Albums (VG-lista) | 17 |
| Scottish Albums (Official Charts) | 37 |
| Spanish Albums (Promusicae) | 19 |
| Swedish Albums (Sverigetopplistan) | 7 |
| Swiss Albums (Schweizer Hitparade) | 8 |
| UK Albums (Official Charts) | 53 |
| UK Independent Albums (Official Charts) | 7 |
| UK Rock & Metal Albums (Official Charts) | 3 |
| US Billboard 200 | 101 |
| US Heatseekers Albums (Billboard) | 2 |

=== Year-end charts ===
| Chart (2016) | Position |
|---|---|
| German Albums (Offizielle Top 100) | 69 |
