= Seventh Avenue (band) =

German Christian metal band

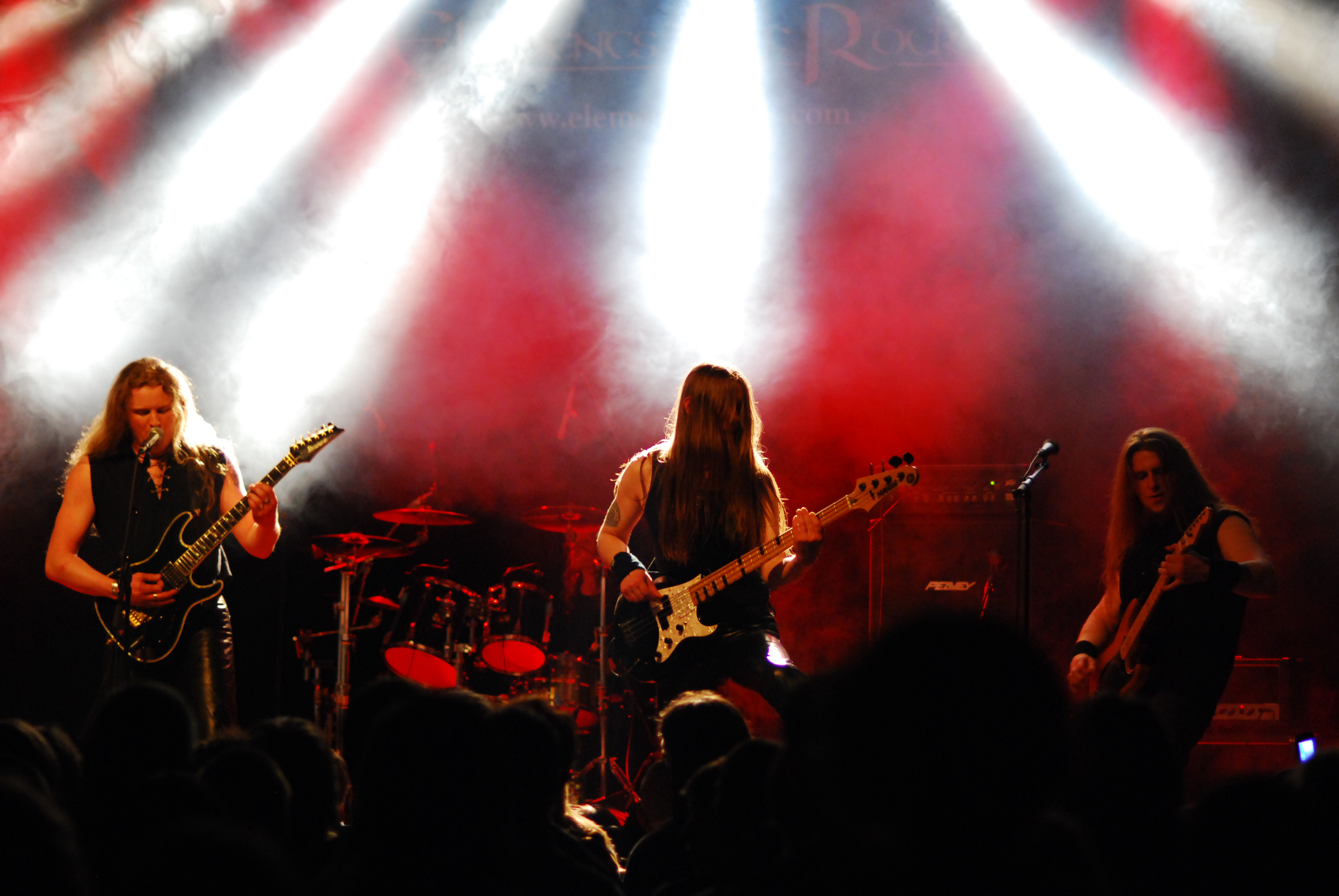
- Seventh Avenue at Elements of Rock, Switzerland, 2008

Background information
- Also known as: The Preachers (1989-1992)
- Origin: Wolfsburg, Germany
- Genres: Christian metal, heavy metal, power metal, speed metal, progressive metal
- Years active: 1989–2012
- Labels: Megahard, Treasure Hunt, Massacre
- Past members: Herbie Langhans; Mike Pflüger; Florian Gottsleben; Markus Beck; Louis Schock; Andi Gutjahr; Wiliam Hieb; Geronimo Stade

Seventh Avenue was a Christian metal band from Wolfsburg, Germany, formed in 1989. Consisting of guitarist/vocalist Herbie Langhans, guitarist Florian Gottsleben, bassist Markus Beck, and drummer Mike Pflüger, Seventh Avenue played a hybrid style of speed and power metal with a focus on melodies. They released six albums and two EPs.

The band launched a demo titled First Strike in 1993, but the loss of their guitarist delayed their first album, Rainbowland, until 1995. They then signed with Treasure Hunt Records. Their first release on this label, Tales of Tales, topped at No. 18 on the Japanese heavy metal charts. The 1998 release Southgate was licensed to Megahard Records for release in Brazil, where the band subsequently toured.

== History ==
In 1989, a few teenagers, inspired by heavy metal bands, began to make music themselves. A CD was released on a small label. Two years later, the singer left the band and, at only 17 years of age, then-guitarist Herbie Langhans took the place as the new leading vocalist. Because of the change, the band began to think about a new name. In 1992, "Seventh Avenue" was chosen in a mutual agreement.

In 1993, they released their first demo, First Strike, which was far more successful than expected. Therefore, a number of live concerts followed.

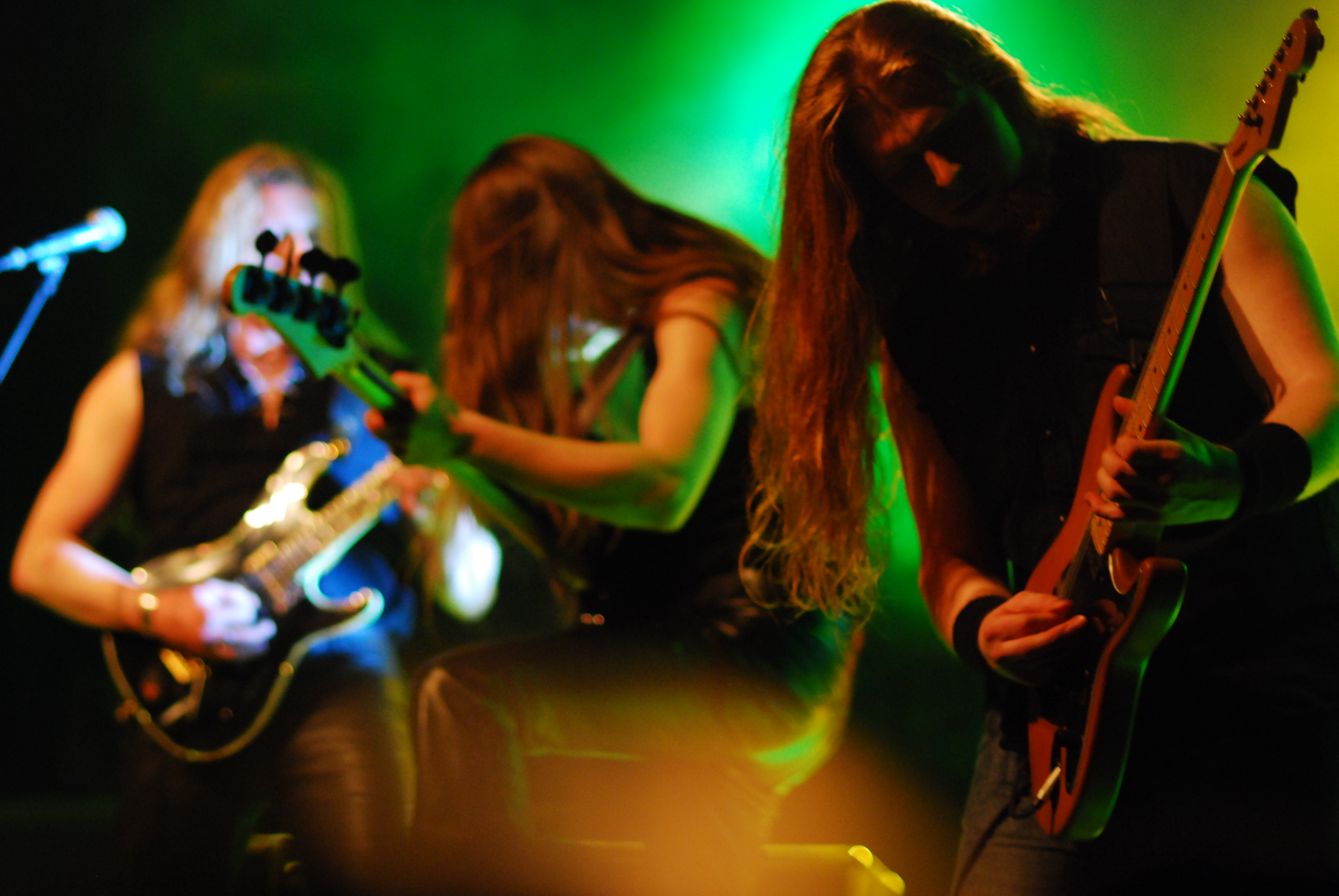
Guitarist Florian Gottsleben (right)

A year later, they were planning their new album Rainbowland. However, because of inner problems in the band, the release was delayed. The second guitarist suddenly left the band. Therefore, Herbie started to also play guitar. After a few months the album was nonetheless released, again with great success.

In 1996, the band signed a contract for two albums with Treasure Hunt Records. They immediately started recording their next album, Tales of Tales. The album subsequently reached the 18th position on the Japanese heavy metal charts.

In 1997, drummer Louis Schock left the band and Mike Pflüger took his place. Andi Gutjahr was hired as a guest musician for the album Southgate which was published in 1998.

In 1999, William Hieb also left the band, leaving only Herbie Langhans and Mike Pflüger. A short time later, they found another bassist and second guitarist in Geronimo Stade and Florian Gottsleben. After a short time, the recording was followed by several concerts. In Brazil, the band achieved remarkable popularity which bought Megahard Records the licensing rights for South America.

In late 2001, Seventh Avenue began the recordings for the album Between the Worlds. In September 2002, the band broke into a tour to Brazil where they played so-called "WMetal Concerts", which was organized by Megahard Records. Back in Germany Seventh Avenue signed a contract with Massacre Records. In 2003, the album Between the Worlds, and in 2004, its follow-up Eternals were published. Bassist Geronimo left the band and Markus Beck took his place.

The album Terium, their first concept album, was released on 28 March 2008 on Massacre Records and emphasizes the groups penchant for catchy choruses and memorable melodies while delivering an even heavier sound than previous releases.

The band announced their dissolution on 4 September 2012, through their website.

== Musical style ==
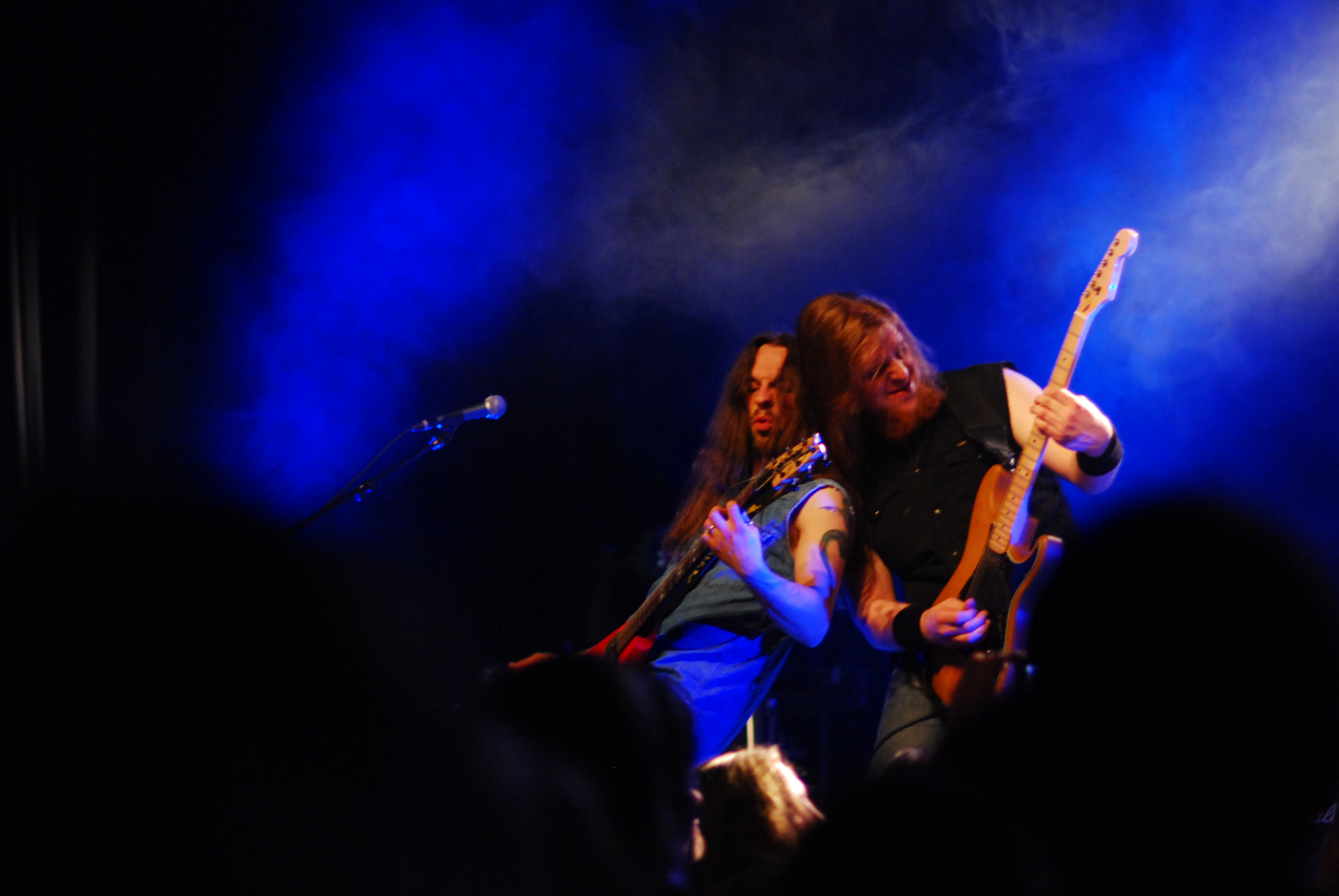
Bassist Markus Beckk (left) and guitarist Florian Gottsleben (right) in 2008

Seventh Avenue's music emphasizes classic heavy metal styles, playing a hybrid of speed and power metal. Their music typically consists of fast double bass drums, melodic and epic lead guitar melodies and double guitar harmonies, and rousing, catchy vocals. Their music seldom contains keyboards currently, the instrument was more apparent in their past works. Their music can be considered Christian metal, as it often draws its themes from the Bible.

== Related projects ==
Herbie Langhans and Andi Gutjahr, along with other members, produced a tribute album in 1998 titled A Tribute to the Past under the name Treasure Seeker. The album highlighted the bands' influences including Bloodgood, Stryper, and Bride.

As of 2010, Herbie Langhans was included in the project Sinbreed with members of Blind Guardian and Redkey.

== Discography ==
- Rainbowland (1995)
- Children (1995) EP
- Tales of Tales (1996)
- Southgate (1998)
- Goodbye (1999) EP
- Between the Worlds (2003)
- Eternals (2004)
- Terium (2008)
