= The Mystery of Time =

Studio album by Avantasia
- Released: 27 March 2013
- Recorded: June 2012 – January 2013
- Genre: Symphonic power metal
- Length: 62:00
- Label: Nuclear Blast
- Producers: Sascha Paeth and Tobias Sammet

Avantasia chronology
The Flying Opera (2011)	The Mystery of Time (2013)	Ghostlights (2016)

Professional ratings
Review scores
Source	Rating
Metal Blast	4/5 stars
Metal Storm	8.2/10
Time For Metal	9.5/10 stars

The Mystery of Time is the sixth full-length album by Tobias Sammet's German metal opera project Avantasia. The album was released on 27 March 2013. This is the first Avantasia release to feature the German Film Orchestra Babelsberg (the same orchestra that performed on Edguy's album Hellfire Club). The cover artwork was painted by Rodney Matthews.

The Mystery Of Time scored high positions in several international music charts and even enabled Avantasia to enter the US Billboard charts for the first time.

When asked to compare the album to Avantasia's previous efforts, guitarist and producer Sascha Paeth described it as follows:

It is a more 'fantastic' production, based a little bit more on orchestra work and keyboards. It's more like a film score, to underline the whole story, the rock opera aspect, which was a choice on this one and I think it works out fine. Also, this gives the album a face of its own.

== Track listing ==
Limited editions of the album include a second CD with instrumental versions of all the tracks on the album, with the exception of the two limited edition bonus tracks.

All tracks are written by Tobias Sammet.

No.	Title	Guest Vocalist	Length
1.	"Spectres"	Joe Lynn Turner	6:09
2.	"The Watchmakers' Dream"	Turner	4:14
3.	"Black Orchid"	Biff Byford	6:52
4.	"Where Clock Hands Freeze"	Michael Kiske	4:35
5.	"Sleepwalking"	Cloudy Yang	3:52
6.	"Savior in the Clockwork"	Turner, Byford, Kiske	10:40
7.	"Invoke the Machine"	Ronnie Atkins	5:30
8.	"What's Left of Me"	Eric Martin	5:07
9.	"Dweller in a Dream"	Kiske	4:45
10.	"The Great Mystery"	Bob Catley, Turner, Byford	10:03
Total length:			62:00

Limited & Japanese edition bonus tracks
No.	Title	Length
11.	"The Cross and You"	4:14
12.	"Death Is Just a Feeling (Alternative Version/Tobias Sammet)"	5:24
Total length:		71:38

== Story ==
The album booklet describes the story "So take the time to follow me into a small old English town during the Victorian era and join a young agnostic scientist by the name Aaron Blackwell as he is forced to explore the coherencies of time, God and science; torn between belief in his professional conviction, his spiritual intuition, love and a lodge of scientific occultists."

Characters: Each singer represents a character in the story, appealing to Avantasia's albums' "metal opera" signature theme.

- Tobias Sammet: Aaron Blackwell, young scientist
- Michael Kiske: Antiquarian
- Bob Catley: Epiphany
- Joe Lynn Turner: Science
- Biff Byford: Reason
- Ronnie Atkins: Nobleman
- Eric Martin: Beggar
- Cloudy Yang: Apparition

== Personnel ==
- Tobias Sammet - lead vocals, bass
- Sascha Paeth - lead & rhythm guitars, guitar solos on tracks 1, 4 to 9; additional bass; additional keyboards
- Miro - keyboards, piano
- Russell Gilbrook - drums

=== Special guests ===
==== Musicians ====
- Guitars
  - Bruce Kulick - solo on tracks 3, 6, 10
  - Oliver Hartmann - solo on tracks 4, 7
  - Arjen Anthony Lucassen - solo on track 2
- Organ
  - Ferdy Doernberg - hammond organ solo on track 2

==== Vocalists ====
- Joe Lynn Turner - co-lead vocals on tracks 1, 2, 6, 10
- Michael Kiske - co-lead vocals on tracks 4, 6, 9
- Biff Byford - co-lead vocals on tracks 3, 6, 10
- Ronnie Atkins - co-lead vocals on track 7
- Eric Martin - co-lead vocals on track 8
- Bob Catley - co-lead vocals on track 10
- Cloudy Yang - co-lead vocals on track 5

== Charts ==
Chart (2013)	Peak position
Austrian Albums (Ö3 Austria)	11
Belgian Albums (Ultratop Flanders)	97
Belgian Albums (Ultratop Wallonia)	70
Dutch Albums (Album Top 100)	85
Finnish Albums (Suomen virallinen lista)	9
French Albums (SNEP)	61
German Albums (Offizielle Top 100)	2
Hungarian Albums (MAHASZ)	15
Norwegian Albums (VG-lista)	19
Scottish Albums (Official Charts)	85
Spanish Albums (Promusicae)	29
Swedish Albums (Sverigetopplistan)	9
Swiss Albums (Schweizer Hitparade)	5
UK Albums (Official Charts)	97
UK Independent Albums (Official Charts)	20
UK Rock & Metal Albums (Official Charts)	6
US Heatseekers Albums (Billboard)	9
US Top Hard Rock Albums (Billboard)	33
