= Eric Singer =

American drummer (born 1958)

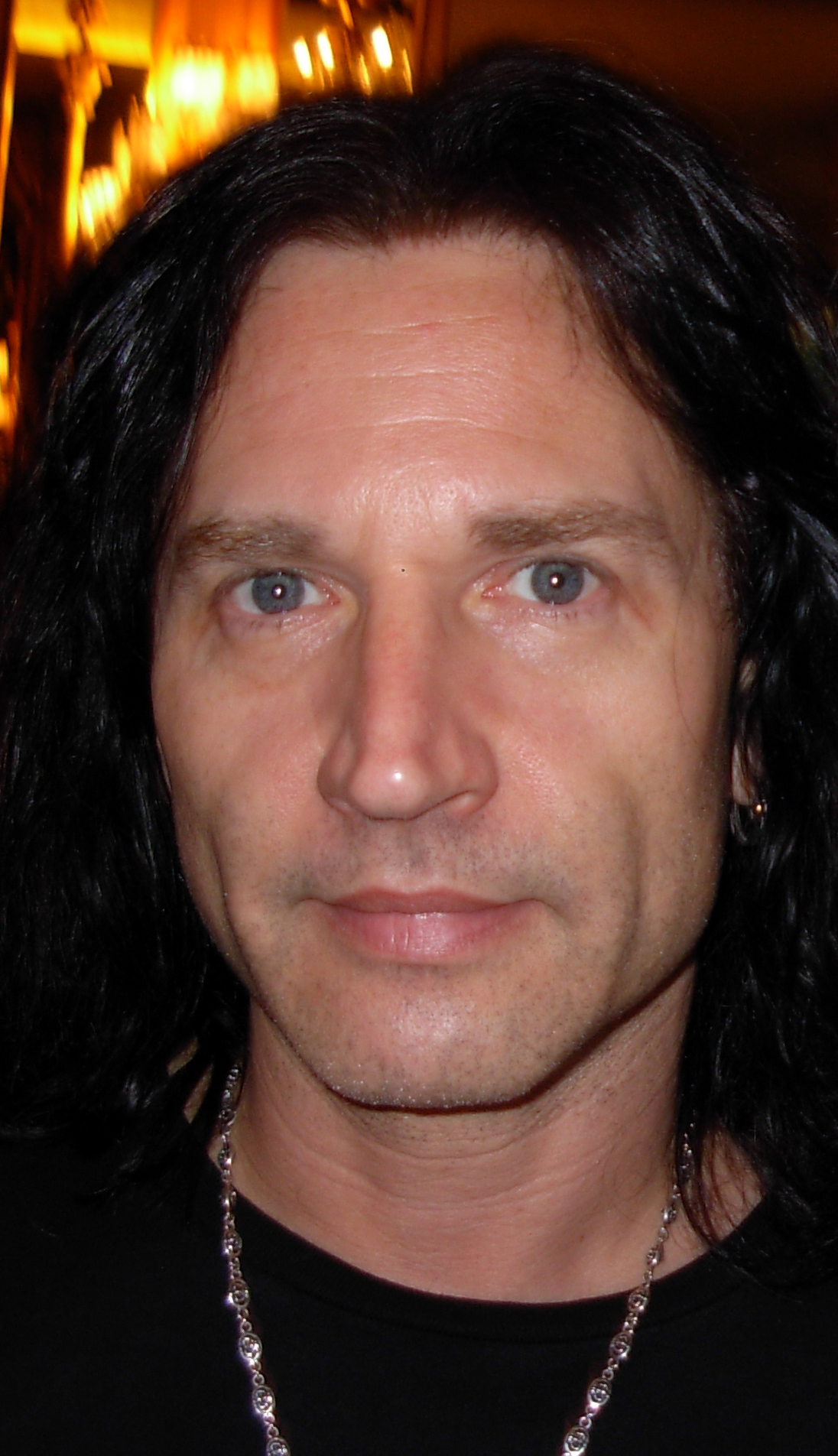
- Singer in 2008

Background information
- Born: Eric Doyle Mensinger; May 12, 1958 (age 68); Cleveland, Ohio, U.S.
- Genres: Hard rock; heavy metal; glam metal
- Occupation: Musician
- Instruments: Drums; vocals
- Years active: 1984–present
- Member of: ESP, Paul Stanley's Soul Station
- Formerly of: Black Sabbath; Badlands; The Brian May Band; Kiss

Eric Singer (born Eric Doyle Mensinger; May 12, 1958) is an American drummer. Known as a drummer and vocalist in the hard rock band Kiss across three stints (1991–1996, 2001–2002, 2004–2023), he has also performed with artists such as Black Sabbath, Alice Cooper, Lita Ford, Badlands, Brian May and Gary Moore as well as his own band ESP. In his career, Singer has appeared on over 75 albums and 11 EPs.

== Early life ==
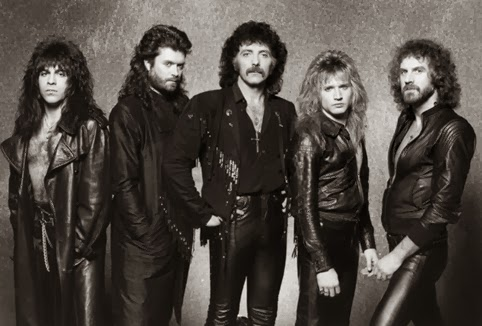
Singer (second from the right) with Black Sabbath, 1986

Singer was born May 12, 1958, Eric Doyle Mensinger in Cleveland, Ohio. He grew up in Euclid, Ohio. He graduated from Euclid High School in 1976. His father, Johnny Mensinger, was of Jewish German descent and was a local big band leader who played around the area as well as on cruise ships from the United States to Europe and back. Eric's brother Jon Mensinger was a principal dancer for the Mark Morris Dance Group in New York. Young Eric began playing drums from an early age, and was inspired by bands such as Humble Pie, the Who, Led Zeppelin, Black Sabbath, the Beatles and Queen and drummers such as John Bonham, Keith Moon, Cozy Powell, Roger Taylor, Bill Ward, and Buddy Rich.

Singer worked at King Musical instruments before becoming a professional drummer.

== Career ==
Singer's first professional drumming job was in the Cleveland band Beau Coup. He then became Lita Ford's touring drummer in 1984. In 1985 he joined Black Sabbath and recorded and toured to support the Seventh Star album. In 1987, during the recordings of The Eternal Idol he left the band to tour with Gary Moore band in support of his album Wild Frontier. After the tour, he was invited by his Black Sabbath colleague Ray Gillen to join Badlands. Singer accepted and played on the band's self-titled debut album. Singer left the group in 1989 as he would join Paul Stanley as his touring drummer on his solo tour of the United States and Canada. Singer played with Olivia Newton-John in the music video for "Culture Shock". He later revealed in an interview that he obtained that gig because he was working for Lita Ford at the time.

=== Kiss ===
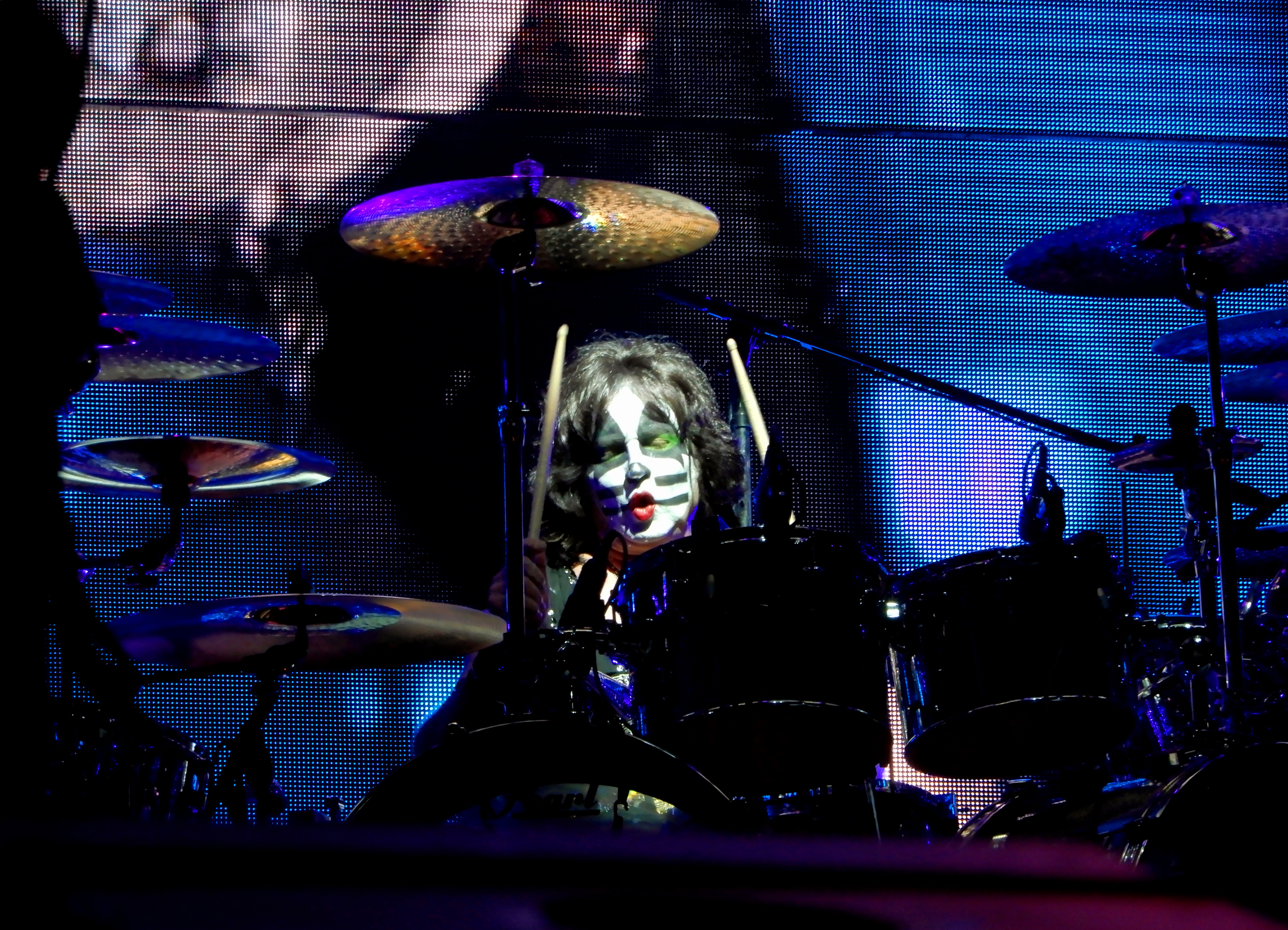
Singer performing with Kiss in 2019

In December 1991, Singer officially became the drummer for Kiss after the death of Eric Carr. Singer, who had performed with Paul Stanley on his club tour along with Bob Kulick two years earlier, was hired and debuted with the band on the album Revenge, on which he was originally slated to fill in on some tracks while Eric Carr recuperated from heart cancer. Singer played on Carnival of Souls: The Final Sessions and toured with Kiss until 1996, when the band reunited with original drummer Peter Criss and guitarist Ace Frehley for the Alive/Worldwide Tour.

After five relatively quiet years, during which Singer toured with Queen guitarist Brian May, Singer was asked to rejoin Kiss in 2001 after Criss' departure shortly before the Australian and Japanese leg of Kiss' Farewell tour. Singer debuted in full "Catman" makeup and costume for the first time on the tour, which caused some controversy as the persona had previously been used only by Criss. Singer was replaced again by Criss in late 2002 but returned to the band in early 2004 after Gene Simmons and Paul Stanley opted not to renew Criss' contract. Since then, Singer has been playing drums in Kiss as their permanent drummer.

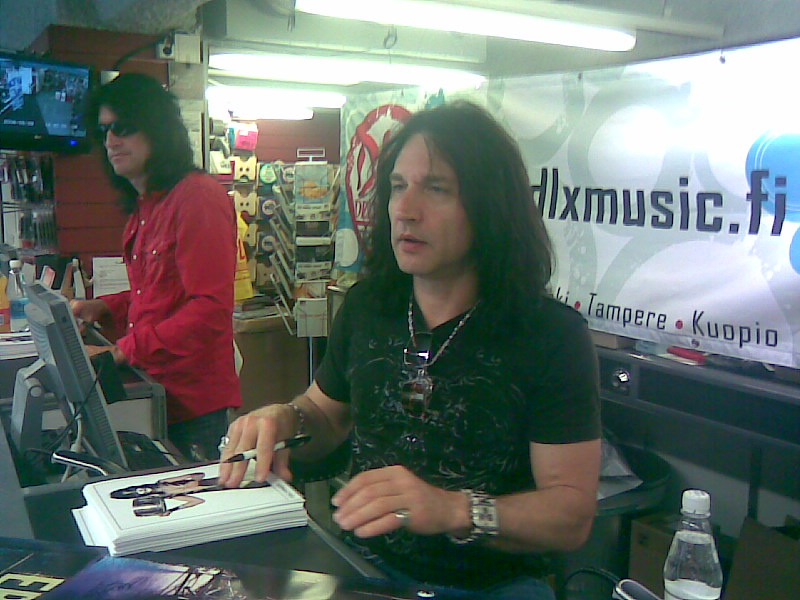
Eric Singer (right) with Tommy Thayer in 2008

In 2009, Singer, along with lead guitarist Tommy Thayer, played and sang on the Kiss album Sonic Boom, the first studio album to feature the new line-up. It included the track "All for the Glory" (written by Stanley and Simmons) with vocals by Singer. In October 2012, Kiss released their 20th studio album Monster which includes a track called "All for the Love of Rock & Roll" sung by Singer (written by Stanley).

In a 2008 interview, Peter Criss stated that he thought Singer was a great drummer, despite being upset about Singer using his image.

=== Eric Singer Project, Alice Cooper and other projects ===
When not touring with Kiss, Singer performed with Alice Cooper. Singer had been a member of Cooper's band since the release of the album Brutal Planet in 2000. Singer had already performed with Cooper years earlier, during the tours for the album Trash and Hey Stoopid. Singer has been featured on three Alice Cooper albums to date, namely, Brutal Planet, The Eyes of Alice Cooper, and Along Came a Spider. In 2008, Eric Singer left Cooper's band on Cooper's suggestion that he (Eric) instead focus on his growing commitments with Kiss as well as with the Eric Singer Project (ESP).

He performed and recorded with his band ESP, featuring, among others, his former Kiss bandmate Bruce Kulick and former Mötley Crüe lead singer John Corabi. Three releases have resulted from this collaboration: the studio album Lost and Spaced (1998), consisting completely of covers from classic rock songs; the live album Live in Japan (2006); and the DVD Live at the Marquee (2006).

Singer has also played in the band Avantasia, replacing drummer Alex Holzwarth after a guest performance in the song "Into the Unknown" from the album The Metal Opera Part II. Two EPs and one full album have been released with Singer's performance on the drums: Lost in Space Part I, Lost in Space Part II, and The Scarecrow, and on several songs from The Wicked Symphony and Angel of Babylon.

In 1989, he made a brief appearance in the Wes Craven film Shocker, as a member of a fictional rock band.

In 1998, he toured with Queen guitarist, Brian May, in a solo tour as part of The Brian May Band. He was brought in as a replacement for Cozy Powell who had died earlier that year.

In 2004 Singer was featured on Italian rock singer Chris Catena's debut album, Freak Out. He recorded drums for two tracks, "Sweet Talker" (a Whitesnake cover) and "The Stronger You Are, The Harder You Fall".

Singer is the drummer for Paul Stanley's side project Soul Station, which performs soul cover songs.

== Equipment ==
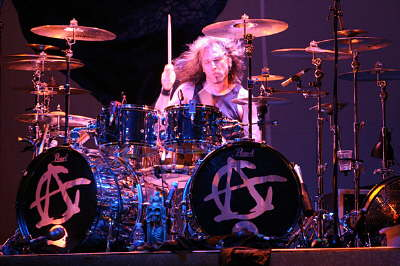
Eric Singer performing with Alice Cooper

Throughout his career, Singer has used Pearl drums, hardware and pedals; Remo and Terry Bozzio Attack signature drumheads; Zildjian cymbals and drumsticks; and ddrum acoustic drum triggers. Singer has his own signature series snare drum and artist series drumsticks by Pearl, and Zildjian also makes its own "Eric Singer Artist Series" drumsticks. Singer also uses Zildjian wax for his drumsticks.

== Discography ==
=== Black Sabbath ===
- Seventh Star (1986)
- The Eternal Idol (1987)

=== Gary Moore ===
- Wild Frontier Tour - Live at Isstadion Stockholm (VHS) (1987)

=== Drive ===
- Characters In Time (1988)

=== Badlands ===
- Badlands (1989)

=== Bill Ward ===
- Ward One: Along the Way (1990)

=== Kiss ===
- Revenge (1992)
- Alive III (1993)
- KISS Unplugged (1996)
- Carnival of Souls: The Final Sessions (1997)
- Kiss Instant Live (2004)
- Kiss Alive 35 (2008)
- Sonic Boom (2009)
- Kiss Sonic Boom Over Europe (2010)
- Monster (2012)
- KISS Rocks Vegas (2016)
- Off The Soundboard Tokyo 2001 (2021)
- Off The Soundboard Virginia Beach 2004 (2022)

=== Greg Chaisson ===
- It's About Time (1994)

=== Stream ===
- Nothing Is Sacred (1998)

=== Solo – Eric Singer Project ===
- Lost and Spaced (1998)
- ESP (1999)
- Live in Japan (2006)
- Live at the Marquee (DVD) (2006)

=== Gilby Clarke ===
- 99 Live (1999)

=== 28IF ===
- 28IF (1999)

=== Alice Cooper ===
- Brutal Planet (2000)
- Brutally Live (DVD) (2001)
- The Eyes of Alice Cooper (2003)
- Live at Montreux (DVD) (2006)
- Along Came a Spider (2008)

=== Chris Catena ===
- Freak Out! (2003)

=== Gene Simmons ===
- Asshole (2004)

=== Avantasia ===
- Lost in Space (Part 1) (2007)
- Lost in Space (Part 2) (2007)
- The Scarecrow (2008)
- The Wicked Symphony (2010) (Only 3 tracks)
- Angel of Babylon (2010) (Only 4 tracks)

=== Bruce Kulick ===
- BK3 (2010)

=== Ronnie Montrose ===
- 10x10 (2017)

=== Paul Stanley's Soul Station ===
- Now & Then (2021)

Preceded by Eric Carr	Drummer for Kiss; 1991–1996	Succeeded by Peter Criss
Preceded by Peter Criss	Drummer for Kiss; 2001–2002	Succeeded by Peter Criss
Preceded by Peter Criss	Drummer for Kiss; 2004–current	Succeeded by Incumbent
