= A Paranormal Evening with the Moonflower Society =

Studio album by Avantasia
- Released: 21 October 2022
- Genres: Symphonic power metal, progressive metal
- Length: 53:58
- Label: Nuclear Blast
- Producers: Sascha Paeth; Tobias Sammet

Avantasia chronology
Moonglow (2019)	A Paranormal Evening with the Moonflower Society (2022)	Here Be Dragons (2025)

Singles from A Paranormal Evening with the Moonflower Society
- 1. "The Wicked Rule the Night" Released: 19 May 2022; 2. "The Moonflower Society" Released: 13 July 2022; 3. "Misplaced Among the Angels" Released: 2 August 2022; 4. "The Inmost Light" Released: 23 September 2022

Professional ratings
Review scores
Source	Rating
laut.de	4/5 stars
Metal.de	8/10
Metal Hammer	6/7
Metal Storm	7.2/10
Rock Hard	8.5/10
Sputnikmusic	3.5/5

A Paranormal Evening with the Moonflower Society is the ninth studio album by Tobias Sammet's German metal opera project Avantasia. It was released on 21 October 2022, through Nuclear Blast.

== Background ==
According to Avantasia founder Tobias Sammet, song ideas go back as far as 2018 but were not finalized until a few months before the album release. On 19 May 2022, he announced the album for release in Fall 2022. Sammet expressed his content with the album, saying that any song could classify as a first single. The song "The Wicked Rule the Night", along with a lyric video were released the same day. The album title and release date were revealed on 29 June 2022. In a press statement, Sammet explained how his active involvement in arranging, orchestrating and producing the album has made the record feel "extremely personal" to him. In support of the album, the band held six concerts in Germany and Switzerland in Summer 2022.

== Track listing ==
All tracks are written by Tobias Sammet.

No.	Title	Guest vocalist(s)	Length
1.	"Welcome to the Shadows"		5:05
2.	"The Wicked Rule the Night"	Ralf Scheepers	4:25
3.	"Kill the Pain Away"	Floor Jansen	3:44
4.	"The Inmost Light"	Michael Kiske	3:27
5.	"Misplaced Among the Angels"	Jansen	5:17
6.	"I Tame the Storm"	Jørn Lande	3:53
7.	"Paper Plane"	Ronnie Atkins	3:54
8.	"The Moonflower Society"	Bob Catley	5:14
9.	"Rhyme and Reason"	Eric Martin	4:42
10.	"Scars"	Geoff Tate	4:13
11.	"Arabesque"	Lande; Kiske	10:10
Total length:			53:58

== Personnel ==
Adapted from the album's booklet, Nuclear Blast

Avantasia

- Tobias Sammet – lead vocals, keyboard, bass guitar
- Sascha Paeth – guitar, bass guitar, mixing
- Michael Rodenberg – keyboard, orchestration on tracks 5, 11
- Felix Bohnke – drums

Guest vocalists

- Floor Jansen
- Jørn Lande
- Michael Kiske
- Bob Catley
- Ralf Scheepers
- Geoff Tate
- Ronnie Atkins
- Eric Martin

Additional musicians

- Oliver Hartmann – additional lead guitar on track 4
- Herbie Langhans, Ina Morgan – backing vocals on tracks 1, 3, 6, 7

== Charts ==
=== Weekly charts ===
Weekly chart performance for A Paranormal Evening with the Moonflower Society
Chart (2022)	Peak position
Australian Hitseekers Albums (ARIA)	17
Austrian Albums (Ö3 Austria)	7
Belgian Albums (Ultratop Flanders)	68
Belgian Albums (Ultratop Wallonia)	87
Dutch Albums (Album Top 100)	52
Finnish Albums (Suomen virallinen lista)	13
German Albums (Offizielle Top 100)	3
Italian Albums (FIMI)	76
Japanese Albums (Oricon)	42
Polish Albums (ZPAV)	31
Scottish Albums (Official Charts)	15
Spanish Albums (Promusicae)	16
Swedish Albums (Sverigetopplistan)	10
Swiss Albums (Schweizer Hitparade)	4
UK Album Downloads (Official Charts)	20
UK Independent Albums (Official Charts)	10
UK Rock & Metal Albums (Official Charts)	3

=== Year-end charts ===
Year-end chart performance for A Paranormal Evening with the Moonflower Society
Chart (2022)	Position
German Albums (Offizielle Top 100)	98
