= Oliver Hartmann =

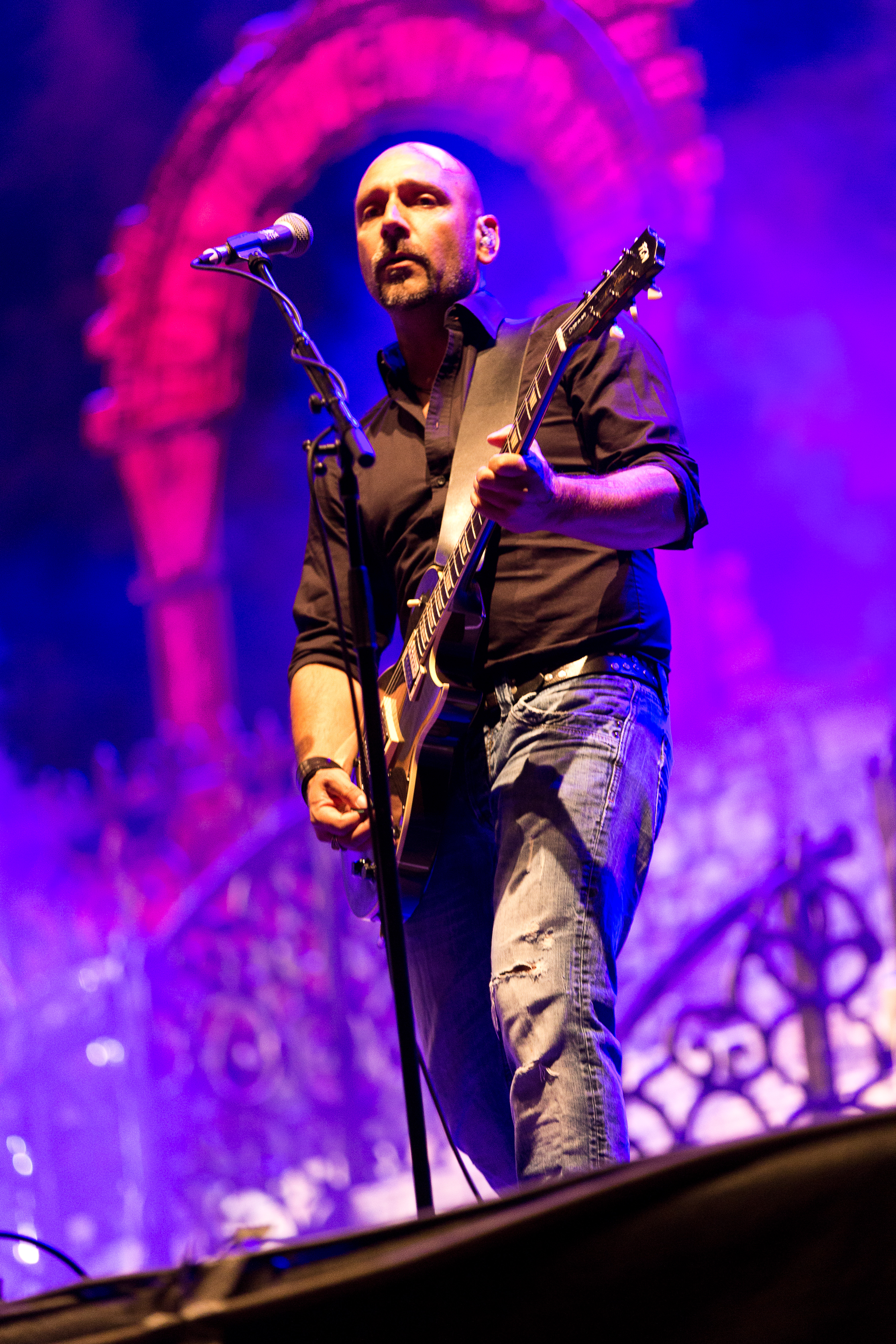
- Hartmann in 2016

Background information
- Born: 28 June 1970 (age 56); Rüsselsheim, West Germany
- Genres: Heavy metal, hard rock
- Occupations: Singer-songwriter, musician
- Instruments: Vocals, guitar, keyboards
- Years active: 1997–present
- Labels: Frontiers, Avenue of the Allies
- Website: http://www.oliverhartmann.com

Oliver Hartmann (born 28 June 1970 in Rüsselsheim, West Germany) is a German heavy metal vocalist, guitarist, songwriter, and producer who performed in various acts, either as guitarist, solo or choir singer. He is best known for his role as vocalist and one of the founders of the band At Vance, his own band Hartmann and his guest appearances on albums of several prominent metal bands, including Freedom Call, Edguy, Rhapsody, Genius rock opera, Iron Mask, Aina's metal opera Days of Rising Doom and the metal opera Avantasia where he participated as a vocalist in 4 albums and also as a guitarist of the live and studio line up. He is also guitarist and vocalist with the Pink-Floyd tribute band Echoes.

Hartmann began his career as guitarist in several local bands but since the age of 18 concentrated more on his singing. Among others he played in bands as Hanz Damf, Tuned, and Centers, the latter with which he made his first international appearances. He reached his first success with At Vance, in which he sang from 1999 to 2002. Since leaving At Vance on personal reasons, he concentrated mostly on his solo career and on studio recording. So far he has recorded eight solo studio albums, Out in the Cold, which was released in 2005 on the Italian Frontiers Records label, on which he also plays guitars, Home, which was released in early 2007, the live acoustic DVD/CD Handmade and the following release 3 in late 2009. Hartmann also sang in Italian band Empty Tremor, which was a support act for Dream Theater during a 2004 tour in Italy. With his band, Hartmann also supported Toto during their European tour 2006, House of Lords and The Hooters in 2007. During the past two years, the band Hartmann played numerous festivals and shows as support of bands such as Mother's Finest, Uriah Heep and Y&T.

After the release of Avantasia's 2010 double album "The Wicked Symphony/Angel of Babylon" and a second world tour in December 2010 the live DVD The Flying Opera – Around the world in 20 days, recorded during the first tour in 2008, was released in early 2011 and climbed up many European charts to No 1.

In January 2012, Oliver Hartmann also joined Rock Meets Classic (feat. Ian Gillan, Jimi Jamison, Steve Lukather, Chris Thompson and Robin Beck) on vocals and guitars.

The recordings for the Hartmann album "Balance" were completed in April 2012 and released on the label Avenue of the Allies.

In 2016, Hartmann played guitar on some tracks of Avantasia album Ghostlights and went in the world tour supporting the album. The same year, Hartmann band also released a new studio album called "Shadows & Silhouettes".

May 2018 saw the release of an eight studio album Hands on the Wheel. The album included a duet with Eric Martin lead vocalist of Mr.Big

== Discography ==
=== Hartmann ===
2005–present

- Out in the Cold (2005)
- Home (2007)
- Handmade / Live in Concert (2008)
- 3 (2009)
- Balance (2012)
- The Best is yet to Come (Best-of, 2013)
- Shadows & Silhouettes (2016)
- Hands on the Wheel (2018)
- 15 Pearls and Gems (Compilation, 2020)
- Get Over It (2022)
- Twenty Times Colder (2025)

=== Centers ===
- Centers – Fortuneteller (1997)

=== At Vance ===
- No Escape (1999)
- Heart of Steel (2000)
- Early Works / Centers (2001)
- Dragonchaser (2001)
- Only Human (2002)

=== Empty Tremor ===
- The Alien Inside (2004)

=== Guest appearances ===
==== Vocal on song ====
- Die legende Lebt - 1. FCN Party Project (1998)
- Avantasia – The Metal Opera (2001)
- Avantasia – The Metal Opera Part II (2002)
- Genius – Episode I (2002)
- Magic Kingdom – Metallic Tragedy (2004)
- Iron Mask – Hordes of the Brave (2005)
- Lunatica – The Edge of Infinity (2006)
- Avantasia – The Scarecrow (2008)
- Heavenly – Carpe Diem (2009)
- Vindictiv – Ground Zero (2009)
- Iron Mask – Shadow of the Red Baron (2010)
- Avantasia – The Wicked Symphony (2010)
- Soul Seller – Back to Life (2011)
- Avantasia – The Flying Opera (2011)
- Dreamscape – Everlight (2012)
- PelleK – Bag of Tricks (2012)
- Beyond the Black – Songs of Love and Death (2015)
- Soulspell – The Second Big Bang (2017)
- Serenity – Souls and Sins (Acoustic) (2020)

==== Backing / Choir / Guitar ====
- Edguy – Mandrake (2001)
- Rhapsody – Rain of a Thousand Flames (2001)
- Freedom Call – Eternity (2002)
- Rhapsody – Power of the Dragonflame (2002)
- Squealer – Under the Cross (2002)
- Aina – Days of Rising Doom (2003)
- Edguy – Hellfire Club (2004)
- Genius – Episode II: In Search Of The Little Prince (2004)
- Freedom Call – The Circle of Life (2005)
- Helloween – Keeper of the Seven Keys - The Legacy (2005)
- Edguy – Rocket Ride (2006)
- HammerFall – Threshold (2006)
- Freedom Call – Dimensions (2007)
- Genius – Episode III: The Final Surprise (2007)
- Edguy – Tinnitus Sanctus (2008)
- Avantasia – The Wicked Symphony (2010)
- Avantasia – Angel of Babylon (2010)
- Magic Kingdom – Symphony of War (2010)
- Avantasia – The Flying Opera (2011)
- Iron Mask – Black as Death (2011)
- Edguy – Age of the Joker (2011)
- Primal Fear – Unbreakable (2012)
- Avantasia – The Mystery of Time (2013)
- Avantasia – Ghostlights (2016)
- Avantasia – Moonglow (2019)
- Avantasia – A Paranormal Evening with the Moonflower Society (2022)
