= Avantasia (song) =

2001 song by Avantasia

Single by Avantasia
- Released: 2000 (demo); 8 May 2001 (single)
- Genre: Symphonic power metal
- Songwriter: Tobias Sammet

Avantasia singles chronology
| "Avantasia" (2000) | "'The Metal Opera'" (2001) |

Avantasia is the debut single by German supergroup rock opera project Avantasia. It's a re-recorded version of Avantasia's original demo EP.

== Track listing ==
1. "Avantasia" - 05:30
2. "Reach Out for the Light" - 06:34
3. "Final Sacrifice" - 05:03
4. "Avantasia" (Edit Version) - 04:10

=== Demo track listing ===
1. "Avantasia (demo)"
2. "Reach Out for the Light (demo)"
3. "Final Sacrifice (demo)"

== Personnel ==
- Tobias Sammet (Edguy) - Lead vocals, keyboards
- Henjo Richter (Gamma Ray) - Guitars
- Markus Grosskopf (Helloween) - Bass
- Alex Holzwarth (Rhapsody of Fire) - Drums
- Michael Kiske (Helloween, Unisonic) - Additional lead vocals on tracks 1, 2, 4
- David DeFeis (Virgin Steele) - Additional lead vocals on track 3
