= The Metal Opera Part II =

The Metal Opera Part. II

Studio album by Avantasia
- Released: 26 August 2002
- Recorded: October 1999 – June 2000
- Studios: Rhoen Studio, Germany
- Genre: Symphonic power metal
- Length: 59:12
- Label: AFM Records
- Producers: Tobias Sammet, Norman Meiritz

Avantasia chronology
| The Metal Opera (2001) | The Metal Opera Part. II (2002) | Lost in Space Part I (2007) |

Professional ratings
Review scores
| Source | Rating |
|---|---|
| AllMusic | 4/5 stars |

The Metal Opera Part. II is the second full-length album by Tobias Sammet's German supergroup project, Avantasia. It is a concept album and a metal opera. The songs carry on the story begun in The Metal Opera, with the same characters. Both albums were written over the course of a year, starting in the last quarter of 1998, and both were produced from October 1999 to June 2000, with the works being interrupted for some weeks so Sammet could produce The Savage Poetry with his other band Edguy.

== Track listing ==
All tracks are written by Tobias Sammet.

| No. | Title | Guest Vocalist | Length |
|---|---|---|---|
| 1. | "The Seven Angels" | Michael Kiske, Oliver Hartmann, Kai Hansen, David DeFeis, Rob Rock, Andre Matos, Timo Tolkki | 14:17 |
| 2. | "No Return" | Michael Kiske, Andre Matos | 4:28 |
| 3. | "The Looking Glass" | Bob Catley | 4:53 |
| 4. | "In Quest For" | Bob Catley | 3:53 |
| 5. | "The Final Sacrifice" | David DeFeis | 5:01 |
| 6. | "Neverland" | Rob Rock | 5:00 |
| 7. | "Anywhere" | Tobias Sammet | 5:28 |
| 8. | "Chalice of Agony" | Andre Matos, Kai Hansen | 6:00 |
| 9. | "Memory" | Ralf Zdiarstek | 5:43 |
| 10. | "Into the Unknown" | Sharon den Adel | 4:29 |
| Total length: | | | 59:12 |

== Credits ==
- Tobias Sammet - Keyboards, Bass guitar (on track 10), Vocals (see "Singers")
- Henjo Richter - Guitars
- Markus Grosskopf - Bass guitar
- Alex Holzwarth - Drums

=== Guests ===
==== Musicians ====
- Guitar
  - Jens Ludwig (lead on tracks 5 and 9)
  - Norman Meiritz (rhythm on track 10)
  - Timo Tolkki (lead on tracks 1 and 10)
- Drums
  - Eric Singer (on track 10)
- Keyboard
  - Frank Tischer (Piano on tracks 1, 4 and 7)

==== Singers ====
- Gabriel Laymann - Tobias Sammet - tracks 1–10
- Lugaid Vandroiy - Michael Kiske - tracks 1 and 2
- Brother Jakob - David DeFeis - tracks 1 and 5
- Bailiff Falk von Kronberg - Ralf Zdiarstek - track 9
- Anna Held - Sharon den Adel - track 10
- Bishop Johann von Bicken - Rob Rock - tracks 1 and 6
- Pope Clement VIII - Oliver Hartmann - track 1
- Elderane the Elf - Andre Matos - tracks 1, 2 and 8
- Regrin the Dwarf - Kai Hansen - tracks 1 and 8
- Mysterious Voice of the Tower - Timo Tolkki - track 1
- Tree of Knowledge - Bob Catley - tracks 3 and 4

== Charts ==
| Chart (2002) | Peak position |
|---|---|
| Finnish Albums (Suomen virallinen lista) | 26 |
| French Albums (SNEP) | 64 |
| German Albums (Offizielle Top 100) | 17 |
| Swedish Albums (Sverigetopplistan) | 17 |
| Swiss Albums (Schweizer Hitparade) | 94 |
