= Lost in Space Part I =

Lost in Space (Part 1)

EP by Avantasia
- Released: 16 November 2007
- Recorded: March 2007
- Genre: Symphonic power metal
- Length: 17:53
- Label: Nuclear Blast Records
- Producer: Sascha Paeth & Tobias Sammet

Avantasia chronology
The Metal Opera Part II (2002)	Lost in Space (Part 1) (2007)	Lost in Space (Part II) (2007)

Lost in Space (Part 1) is an EP to the German Avantasia album The Scarecrow.

== Track listing ==
No.	Title	Guest vocalist	Length
1.	"Lost in Space"	Amanda Somerville	3:52
2.	"Lay All Your Love on Me" (ABBA cover)		4:23
3.	"Another Angel Down"	Jørn Lande	5:42
4.	"The Story Ain't Over"	Amanda Somerville, Bob Catley	4:59
5.	"Return to Avantasia" (instrumental)		0:47
6.	"Ride the Sky" (Lucifer's Friend cover)	Eric Singer	2:55

== Bonus features ==
1. Lost in Space (Video Clip)
2. Lost in Space (Making of Video Clip)
3. Photo Gallery + Poster

== Personnel ==
- Tobias Sammet - Lead vocals, bass
- Sascha Paeth - Rhythm & lead guitars
- Eric Singer - Drums, vocals (Track 6)
- Michael "Miro" Rodenberg - Keyboards/Orchestration

=== Guest vocalists ===
- Jørn Lande
- Bob Catley
- Amanda Somerville

=== Guest musicians ===
- Henjo Richter - Additional lead guitars (Track 3)
