= Avantasia =

German heavy metal supergroup

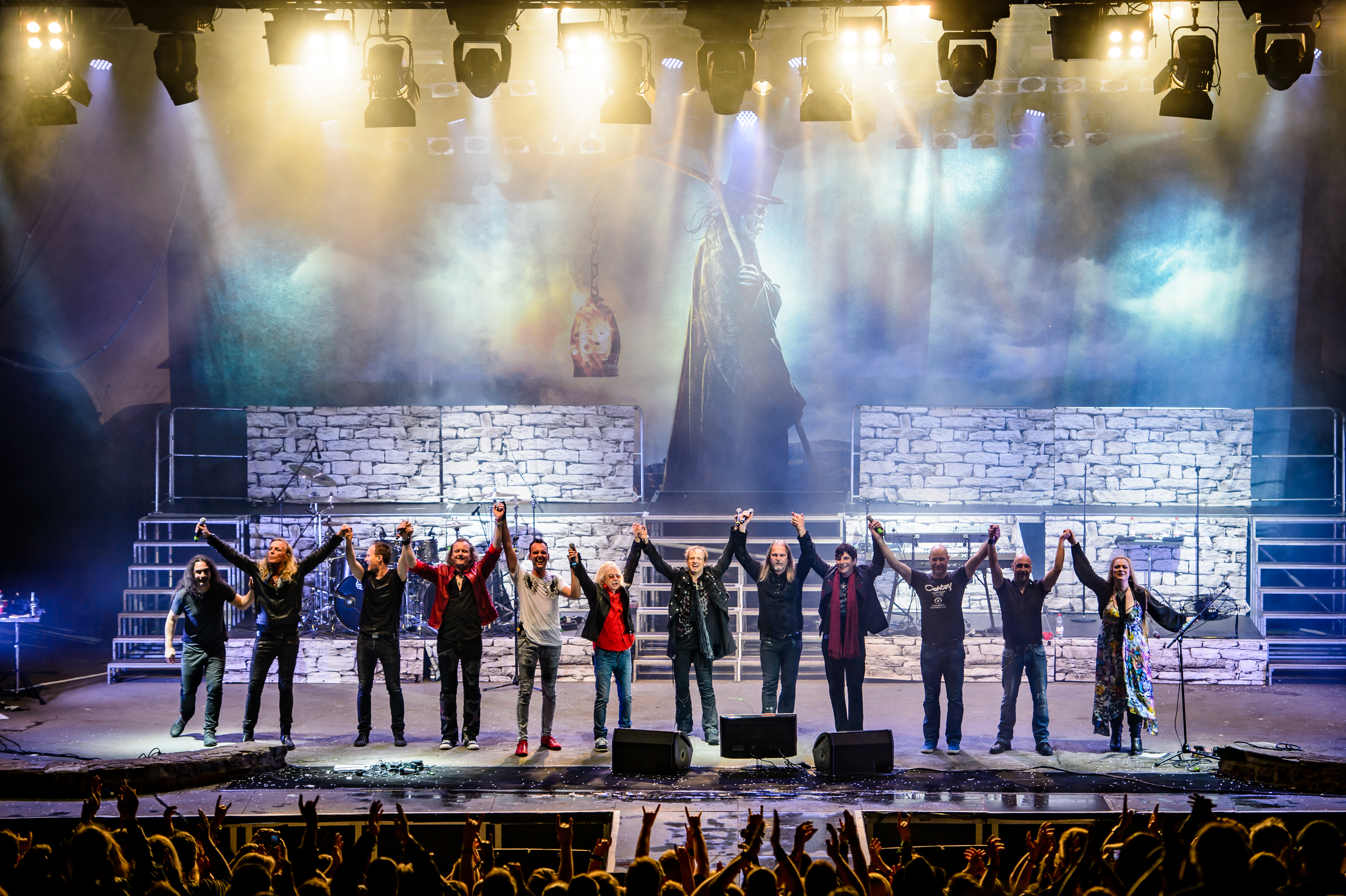
- Avantasia performing in Lorelei, Germany, in 2016

Background information
- Origin: Germany
- Genres: Power metal; Heavy metal; Symphonic metal; Hard rock
- Years active: 1999–2002; 2006–present
- Labels: Napalm Records; AFM; Nuclear Blast
- Spinoff of: Edguy
- Members: Tobias Sammet; Sascha Paeth; Miro; Felix Bohnke
- Past members: See: Members
- Website: www.tobiassammet.com

Avantasia is a German power metal supergroup with influences of opera and hard rock created by Tobias Sammet, vocalist of the band Edguy. It has been characterized as a rock opera, as it features the contributions of various vocalists and musicians and it consists of concept albums. The name is a blend of the words Avalon and fantasia ('fantasy') and describes "a world beyond human imagination" (a quotation from the booklet of the debut album).

Conceived in 1999 as studio-only, two-album project, Avantasia has since released seven other studio albums and has toured the world multiple times. It can be divided into five periods of activity. The first, 1999–2002, saw the release of a self-titled single and the full-length albums The Metal Opera and The Metal Opera Part II. The second, 2006–2011, consists of the EPs Lost in Space Part 1 & 2 and The Wicked Trilogy, composed of the albums The Scarecrow, The Wicked Symphony and Angel of Babylon. The third, 2013–2016, includes the albums The Mystery of Time and Ghostlights. The fourth period, 2019–2022, comprises the albums Moonglow and A Paranormal Evening with the Moonflower Society. Here be Dragons, Avantasia's latest album, represents the fifth and current era.

Some of the guest vocalists and musicians that have been featured on Avantasia are Michael Kiske, Jørn Lande, Alice Cooper, Klaus Meine, Dee Snider, Hansi Kürsch, Jon Oliva, Biff Byford, Joe Lynn Turner, Tim "Ripper" Owens, Geoff Tate, Kai Hansen, Rudolf Schenker, Bruce Kulick, Sascha Paeth, Eric Singer, Bob Catley, Roy Khan, Russell Allen, Timo Tolkki, Rob Rock, David DeFeis, Andre Matos, Sharon den Adel, Floor Jansen, Ralf Scheepers, Marko Hietala, Arjen Anthony Lucassen, Henjo Richter, Markus Grosskopf, Jens Johansson, Eric Martin, Ronnie Atkins, Oliver Hartmann, Mille Petrozza, Candice Night and Amanda Somerville.

== History ==
=== The Metal Operas (1999–2002) ===
In Spring 1999, during Edguy's 'Theater of Salvation' tour, Tobias Sammet began to outline his ideas for a metal opera concept album featuring a number of guest musicians. When the tour finished, he began collaborating with metal vocalists like Michael Kiske, Andre Matos, Kai Hansen, Rob Rock, David Defeis, Sharon den Adel, Bob Catley and Oliver Hartmann to record the project. At this stage the core band consisted of four members, Sammet on keyboards, Henjo Richter on guitar, Markus Grosskopf on bass and Alex Holzwarth on drums. In 2001, a self-titled single and the first full-length album, The Metal Opera, were released. The project went on hiatus after the release of The Metal Opera Part II in September 2002.

=== The Wicked Trilogy (2006–2011) ===
At the end of 2006, Sammet confirmed the rumours of a third Avantasia album, due for release in 2008. Two EPs named Lost in Space Part 1 and Part 2 were released on 19 November 2007, while the full-length album, The Scarecrow, was released on 25 January 2008. The Scarecrow marked the first chapter of "The Wicked Trilogy" concept and was also the first of many Avantasia releases to feature Sascha Paeth on the role of main guitarist and producer. The album included guest performances by drummer Eric Singer, guitarists Henjo Richter and Rudolf Schenker and singers Jørn Lande, Michael Kiske, Bob Catley, Alice Cooper, Roy Khan, Amanda Somerville and Oliver Hartmann.

After the release of The Scarecrow, Tobias Sammet was invited to perform a headlining show at Wacken Open Air, an offer that producer/guitarist Sascha Paeth convinced him to accept. That led to 13 shows between 5 July and 13 August. The shows at Masters of Rock and Wacken Open Air were recorded and the live DVD The Flying Opera, based on the footage, was released in March 2011. The line-up for the short tour consisted of Tobias Sammet, Andre Matos, Jørn Lande, Kai Hansen, Bob Catley, Amanda Somerville, Cloudy Yang, Sascha Paeth, Oliver Hartmann, Robert Hunecke, Miro and Felix Bohnke (Edguy).

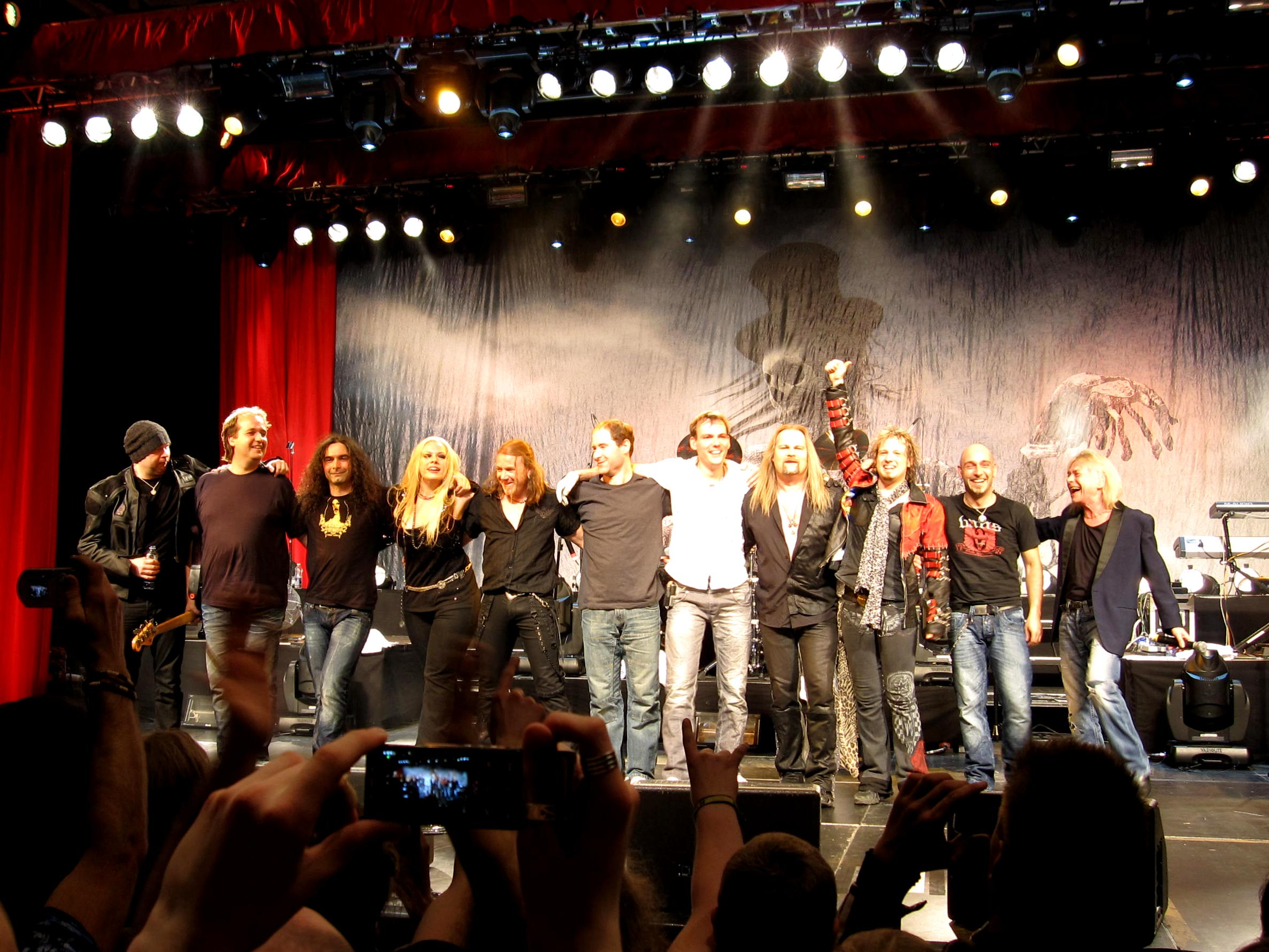
Avantasia live in Stockholm (Sweden) in 2010

In November 2009, Sammet announced that he was recording two new albums, The Wicked Symphony and Angel of Babylon, to be released on 3 April 2010. The concept of the albums was a continuation of The Scarecrow story and these three albums together are often referred to as "The Wicked Trilogy". The special guests included drummers Eric Singer, Alex Holzwarth and Felix Bohnke, guitarists Bruce Kulick and Oliver Hartmann, keyboardist Jens Johansson and vocalists Jørn Lande, Russell Allen, Michael Kiske, Bob Catley, Klaus Meine, Tim "Ripper" Owens, Jon Oliva, Andre Matos, Cloudy Yang and Ralf Zdiarstek. The Scarecrow, The Wicked Symphony and Angel of Babylon have scored high positions in various international music charts.

A 12 show tour of Europe, South America and Asia took place during December 2010, with the exception of one concert at the Wacken Open Air festival in August 2011. The concerts lasted for almost three hours and many of them were sold out days before. The ensemble was almost the same as on The Scarecrow Tour in 2008, with two changes. Andre Matos was replaced by ex-Helloween and current Unisonic singer Michael Kiske (with Kai Hansen also participating on this tour, there were a lot of instances when the two ex-Helloween members shared the same stage) and the fact that Cloudy Yang was not part of the line-up.

Both tours were closely documented by Amanda Somerville on her YouTube channel. The videos show various interesting backstage moments such as rehearsals, cancelled flights, or the ensemble travelling by a regular train.

=== The Ghostlights saga (2012–2017) ===
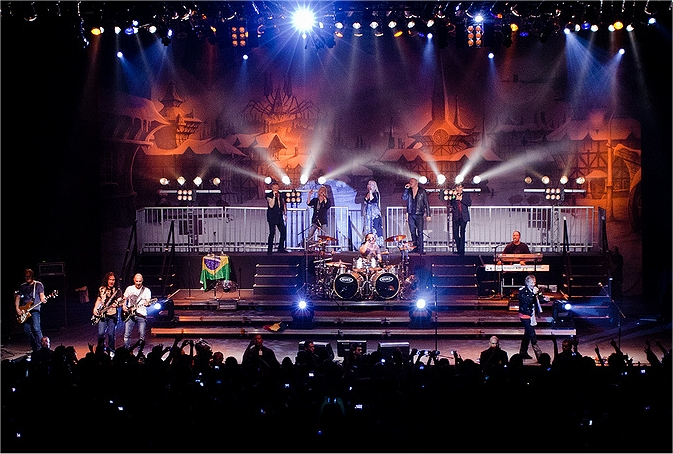
Avantasia live in São Paulo (Brazil) in 2013

In August 2012, Sammet announced that "I didn‘t foresee how much I need Avantasia when I decided to finish this chapter of my life in 2011. After the worldwide success of the latest studio releases, an arena world tour that was sold out pretty much everywhere, collaborations with childhood heroes...I 'knew' that I had said everything I could possibly say in the name of Avantasia. But that's not what Avantasia is all about. I wanna create more great music, I wanna create more fantasy-worlds, the bigger and the more epic, the better. And listening to the material that I have created for this forthcoming chapter in the history of Avantasia, I know there is no way I am not going to do it! I have got the feeling and the certainty, that this is absolutely meant to happen and to be."

During December 2012 it was revealed on Sammet's Avantasia website that the new album would be called The Mystery of Time and was due for release on 30 March 2013. The Mystery of Time marked the beginning of a new concept and was the first Avantasia release to feature the German Film Orchestra Babelsberg. The album included guest performances by drummer Russell Gilbrook, guitarists Bruce Kulick, Oliver Hartmann and Arjen Anthony Lucassen, while the guest vocalists were Joe Lynn Turner, Biff Byford, Michael Kiske, Ronnie Atkins, Eric Martin, Bob Catley and Cloudy Yang. The Mystery Of Time scored high positions in several international music charts and even enabled the project to enter the US Billboard charts for the very first time.

Avantasia's second biggest world tour took place between April and August 2013. The tour consisted of 30 concerts and included 7 headlining festival appearances in Europe, one festival performance in Canada and three hour long shows in South America, Japan, Russia, Germany, Switzerland, Italy and Holland. The line-up for the tour consisted of vocalists Tobias Sammet, Michael Kiske, Ronnie Atkins, Eric Martin, Bob Catley, Thomas Rettke, Amanda Somerville and musicians Sascha Paeth, Oliver Hartmann, Miro, Andre Neygenfind and Felix Bohnke.

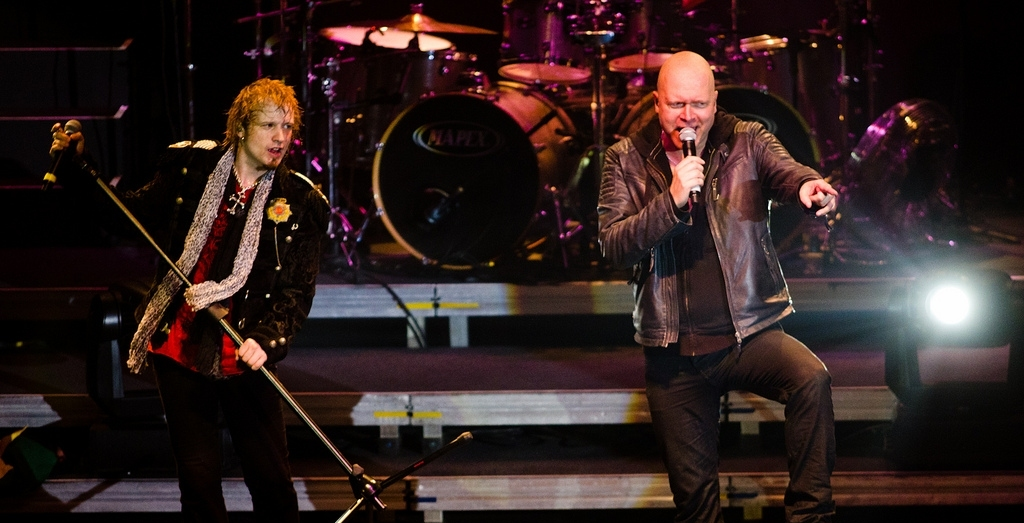
Avantasia live in São Paulo (Brazil) in 2013

According to Sammet: "I wanna put on the biggest thing you have ever seen, I wanna bring more vocalists, play longer shows, and just make it a giant Rock Opera. I love to headline festivals, you run over people in 90 minutes and kick ass. But I also like to do our own Avantasia indoor tour because we can make it much more Avantasia oriented and play almost three hours...It will be huge."

With two shows remaining at the end of the tour, Sammet held a press conference in which he announced that Avantasia would perform a headline performance at Wacken Open Air Festival in 2014. He also indicated that this would be a farewell performance as no further Avantasia activities were planned for the near future:

There won't be any further Avantasia activities, it'll be just a single show. I may be back with an idea and go for it somewhere in the distant future, I won't say farewell is forever this time, but I have no clue as to when and where and who would be able to join us and what it would sound and look like, if we'd ever do this again in a couple of years. So, get your tickets for Wacken 2014 cause it'll be your last chance to catch us, if not forever at least for some years. See you, T

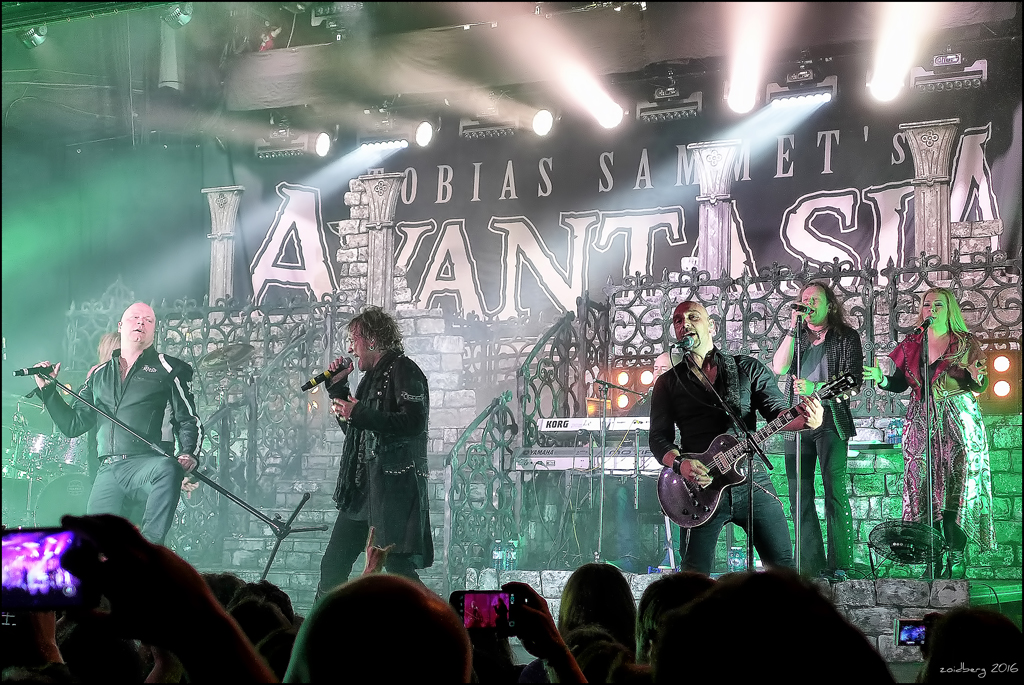
Avantasia live in Madrid (Spain) in 2016

In a May 2014 interview regarding Edguy's then latest release Space Police: Defenders of the Crown, Sammet said that The Mystery of Time hinted at a possible sequel. The new album, entitled Ghostlights, was released on 29 January 2016 and featured guest performances by guitarists Bruce Kulick and Oliver Hartmann, while the guest vocalists were Jørn Lande, Michael Kiske, Dee Snider, Geoff Tate, Marko Hietala, Ronnie Atkins, Sharon den Adel, Bob Catley, Robert Mason and Herbie Langhans. Ghostlights scored the highest positions of any Avantasia release in several international music charts and even enabled Avantasia to enter the US Billboard charts for the second time.

The "biggest world tour so far" took place between March and August 2016. According to Avantasia's website it consisted of approximately 40 concerts in Europe, North America, South America, Canada, Japan, Russia and Scandinavia. With the exclusion of 8 headlining European summer festival performances, each concert lasted for over three hours. The ensemble was almost the same as on the previous tour with the addition of Jørn Lande and Herbie Langhans. As he did after announcing the 2014 Wacken performance, Sammet once again suggested that the Ghostlights World Tour might be the project's last activity in a long time:

After the completion of the tour, Avantasia headlined both Wacken Open Air and Barcelona Rockfest during the summer of 2017.

=== The Moonglow saga (2018–2023) ===
In March 2018, Sammet posted a picture on his Facebook announcing he had begun the creative process regarding the eighth Avantasia album.

On 10 October Nuclear Blast officially announced the new album Moonglow would be released on 15 February 2019, and would feature guest vocals by Jørn Lande, Geoff Tate, Ronnie Atkins, Hansi Kürsch, Bob Catley, Michael Kiske, Candice Night, Eric Martin and Mille Petrozza. Subsequently, the album was accompanied by the Moonglow World Tour 2019 consisting of 29 concerts across Europe, Australia, and the United States and South America taking place between March and June 2019.

In March 2020, Tobias posted that he is about to start working on a successor album to Moonglow. The writing of the new album was in progress throughout 2020 and 2021. The album was released on 21 October 2022 under the title A Paranormal Evening with the Moonflower Society and featured guest vocals by Floor Jansen, Jørn Lande, Michael Kiske, Ralf Scheepers, Bob Catley, Geoff Tate, Eric Martin and Ronnie Atkins.

=== Here Be Dragons (2024–present) ===
In July 2024, Sammet announced Avantasia's tenth studio album, Here Be Dragons, with an accompanying tour. The album was released on 28 February 2025 and featured guest vocals by Geoff Tate, Michael Kiske, Bob Catley, Ronnie Atkins, Roy Khan, Tommy Karevik, Kenny Leckremo and Adrienne Cowan. The release received mainly positive reviews, with Paul Monkhouse of Metal Planet Music calling it, "their finest work yet". Others took a more negative view of the album, with "Steel Druhm" of Angry Metal Guy describing it as, "my least favorite Avantasia album thus far."

== Discography ==
=== Studio albums ===
- The Metal Opera (2001)
- The Metal Opera Part II (2002)
- The Scarecrow (2008)
- The Wicked Symphony (2010)
- Angel of Babylon (2010)
- The Mystery of Time (2013)
- Ghostlights (2016)
- Moonglow (2019)
- A Paranormal Evening with the Moonflower Society (2022)
- Here Be Dragons (2025)

== Band members ==
=== Current ===
- Tobias Sammet – bass, lead vocals, keyboards (2001–present)
- Sascha Paeth – guitars (2007–present)
- Miro – keyboards (2007–present)
- Felix Bohnke – drums (2010, 2015–present)

=== Former ===
- Markus Grosskopf – bass (2001–2002)
- Henjo Richter – guitars (2001–2002, 2007–2010)
- Alex Holzwarth – drums (2001–2002, 2010)
- Eric Singer – drums (2002, 2007–2010), vocals (2007)
- Russell Gilbrook – drums (2013)

== Vocalists ==
Vocalist	Associated bands	Avantasia	The Metal Opera	The Metal Opera Part II	Lost in Space Part 1	Lost in Space Part 2	The Scarecrow	The Wicked Symphony	Angel of Babylon	The Mystery of Time	Ghostlights	Moonglow	A Paranormal Evening with the Moonflower Society	Here Be Dragons
Tobias Sammet	Edguy	all tracks	all tracks, except track 4 (Malleus Maleficarum)	all tracks	all tracks	all tracks	all tracks	all tracks	all tracks, except track 8 (Symphony of Life)	all tracks	all tracks	all tracks	all tracks	all tracks
Michael Kiske	Helloween, Place Vendome, Kiske/Somerville, Unisonic	Reach Out for the Light, Avantasia	Reach Out for the Light, The Tower, Avantasia, Breaking Away, Farewell	The Seven Angels, No Return		Promised Land	Shelter from the Rain, The Scarecrow, What Kind of Love	Wastelands, Runaway Train	Stargazers	Where Clock Hands Freeze, Dweller In A Dream, Savior In The Clockwork	Ghostlights, Unchain the Light, Wake up to the Moon	Requiem for a Dream	The Inmost Light, Arabesque	The Moorlands At Twilight
Kai Hansen	Helloween, Gamma Ray		Inside, Sign of the Cross	The Seven Angels, Chalice of Agony										
David DeFeis	Virgin Steele	Final Sacrifice	Serpents in Paradise, The Tower	The Seven Angels, The Final Sacrifice										
Andre Matos †	Shaman, ex-Angra, ex-Viper, ex-Symfonia		Inside, Sign of the Cross, The Tower	The Seven Angels, No Return, Chalice of Agony				Blizzard On a Broken Mirror						
Rob Rock	ex-Axel Rudi Pell, ex-Warrior, Driver, Impellitteri		The Glory of Rome	The Seven Angels, Neverland										
Sharon den Adel	Within Temptation		Farewell	Into the Unknown							Isle of Evermore			
Oliver Hartmann	ex-At Vance		The Glory of Rome, Sign of the Cross, The Tower	The Seven Angels			I Don't Believe in Your Love		Stargazers					
Bob Catley	Magnum, ex-Hard Rain			The Looking Glass, In Quest for	The Story Ain't Over		Shelter from the Rain, Cry Just a Little	Runaway Train	Journey to Arcadia	The Great Mystery	A Restless Heart and Obsidian Skies, Wake up to the Moon	The Piper at the Gates of Dawn, Lavender	The Moonflower Society	Bring on the Night
Timo Tolkki	ex-Stratovarius, ex-Revolution Renaissance, ex-Symfonia		The Tower											
Ralf Zdiarstek			Malleus Maleficarum, The Glory of Rome	Memory				Black Wings						
Jørn Lande	ex-Ark, ex-Masterplan, Jørn				Another Angel Down	Promised Land	The Scarecrow, Another Angel Down, Devil in the Belfry	The Wicked Symphony, Runaway Train, Crestfallen, Forever is a Long Time	Stargazers, Angel of Babylon, Rat Race, Down in the Dark, Alone I Remember, Promised Land		Let the Storm Descend Upon You, Lucifer, Ghostlights, Wake up to the Moon	The Raven Child, Book of Shallows, The Piper at the Gates of Dawn	I Tame The Storm, Arabesque	
Klaus Meine	Scorpions							Dying for an Angel						
Alice Cooper							The Toy Master							
Roy Khan	Conception, ex-Kamelot						Twisted Mind							Everybody's Here until the End
Amanda Somerville	Aina, Kiske/Somerville, Trillium				Lost in Space, The Story Ain't Over	Lost in Space, Lost in Space	What Kind of Love, Lost in Space							
Eric Singer	Kiss, ex-Black Sabbath, ex-Alice Cooper				Ride the Sky									
Russell Allen	Symphony X, Adrenaline Mob							The Wicked Symphony, States of Matter	Stargazers, Journey to Arcadia					
Tim "Ripper" Owens	ex-Judas Priest, ex-Yngwie Malmsteen, ex-Iced Earth							Scales of Justice						
Jon Oliva	Savatage, Jon Oliva's Pain								Death is Just a Feeling					
Cloudy Yang									Symphony of Life	Sleepwalking				
Joe Lynn Turner	ex-Rainbow, ex-Deep Purple, ex-Yngwie Malmsteen									Spectres, The Watchmakers' Dream, Savior In The Clockwork, The Great Mystery				
Biff Byford	Saxon									Black Orchid, Savior In The Clockwork, The Great Mystery				
Ronnie Atkins	Pretty Maids									Invoke The Machine	Let the Storm Descend Upon You, Unchain the Light, Wake up to the Moon	Book of Shallows, Starlight, The Piper at the Gates of Dawn	Paper Plane	Phantasmagoria
Eric Martin	Mr. Big									What's Left Of Me		The Piper at the Gates of Dawn, Maniac	Rhyme And Reason	
Robert Mason	Warrant, Lynch Mob										Let the Storm Descend Upon You, Babylon Vampyres, Wake up to the Moon			
Dee Snider	Twisted Sister										The Haunting			
Herbie Langhans	Seventh Avenue										Draconian Love			
Marko Hietala	Nightwish, Tarot, Northern Kings, Raskasta Joulua, Sapattivuosi, Sinergy										Master of the Pendulum			
Geoff Tate	Operation: Mindcrime, ex-Queensrÿche										Seduction of Decay	Invincible, Alchemy, The Piper at the Gates of Dawn	Scars	Here be Dragons
Candice Night	Blackmore's Night											Moonglow		
Hansi Kursch	Blind Guardian											Book of Shallows, The Raven Child		
Mille Petrozza	Kreator											Book of Shallows		
Floor Jansen	Nightwish, ex-After Forever												Kill The Pain Away, Misplaced Among The Angels	
Ralf Scheepers	Primal Fear, ex-Gamma Ray												The Wicked Rule The Night	
Tommy Karevik	Kamelot													The Witch
Adrienne Cowan	Seven Spires													Avalon
Kenny Leckremo	H.E.A.T													Against the Wind

== Musicians ==
Musician	Associated bands	Avantasia	The Metal Opera	The Metal Opera Part II	Lost in Space Part 1	Lost in Space Part 2	The Scarecrow	The Wicked Symphony	Angel of Babylon	The Mystery of Time	Ghostlights	Moonglow	A Paranormal Evening with the Moonflower Society	Here Be Dragons
Tobias Sammet	Edguy	Keyboards (all)	Keyboards (all)	Keyboards (all); Bass (10)	Bass (all)	Bass (all)	Bass (all)	Bass (all)	Bass (all)	Bass (all)	Bass (all)	Bass (all)	Keyboards, bass (all)	Bass (all); Keyboards (4)
Henjo Richter	Gamma Ray	Guitars (all)	Guitars (all)	Guitars (all)	Lead guitar (3)	Lead guitar (2, 3, 4)	Lead guitar (2, 3, 6, 7, 8)		Lead guitar (10)					
Markus Grosskopf	Helloween	Bass (all)	Bass (all)	Bass (all)										
Alex Holzwarth	Rhapsody of Fire, ex-Angra	Drums (all)	Drums (all)	Drums (all)				Drums (3, 7, 8, 10)	Drums (1, 2, 3, 11)					
Jens Ludwig	Edguy		Lead guitar (12, 13)	Lead guitar (5, 9)										
Timo Tolkki	ex-Stratovarius, ex-Revolution Renaissance, ex-Symfonia			Lead guitar (1, 10)										
Norman Meiritz			Acoustic guitar (6)	Rhythm guitar (10)										
Frank Tischer			Piano (11)	Piano (1, 4, 7)										
Sascha Paeth	ex-Heavens Gate, Aina				Guitars (all)	Guitars (all)	Guitars (all)	Guitars (all)	Guitars (all)	Guitars (all)	Guitars (all)	Guitars (all)	Guitars, bass (all)	Guitars (all)
Eric Singer	Kiss, ex-Black Sabbath, ex-Alice Cooper			Drums (10)	Drums (all)	Drums (all)	Drums (all)	Drums (2, 4, 6)	Drums (5, 7, 9, 10)					
Michael "Miro" Rodenberg	Aina, Kamelot				Keyboards (all)	Keyboards (all)	Keyboards (all)	Keyboards (all)	Keyboards (all except track 2)	Keyboards (all)	Keyboards (all)	Keyboards (all)	Keyboards (5, 11)	Keyboards (all)
Kai Hansen	Helloween, Gamma Ray, ex-Iron Savior						Lead guitar (3)							
Rudolf Schenker	Scorpions						Lead guitar (10)							
Bruce Kulick	ex-Kiss, Grand Funk Railroad							Lead guitar (6, 11)	Lead guitar (5, 9, 11)	Lead guitar (3, 6, 10)	Lead guitar (9, 10, 12)			
Oliver Hartmann	ex-At Vance, Hartmann							Lead guitar (2, 8)	Lead guitar (1, 2, 3)	Lead guitar (4, 7)	Lead guitar (2, 5, 9, 11)	Lead guitar (4)	Lead guitar (4)	
Arne Wiegand	Santiano													Lead guitar (3)
Felix Bohnke	Edguy							Drums (1, 5, 9 11)	Drums (4, 6, 8)		Drums (all)	Drums (all)	Drums (all)	Drums (all)
Jens Johansson	Stratovarius, ex-Yngwie Malmsteen								Keyboards (2)					
Eddy Wrapiprou	Edguy								Keyboards (all)					
Simon Oberender †								Organ (11)	Organ (9)					
Russell Gilbrook	Uriah Heep									Drums (all)				
Arjen Anthony Lucassen	Ayreon, Star One, Guilt Machine, Ambeon, ex-Stream of Passion, ex-Vengeance, ex-Bodine									Lead guitar (2)				
Ferdy Doernberg	Axel Rudi Pell, ex-Matt Gonzo Roehr, Sainted Sinners									Hammond Organ (2)				
