= Lost in Space Part II =

Lost in Space (Part 2)

EP by Avantasia
- Released: 16 November 2007
- Recorded: March 2007
- Genre: Symphonic power metal
- Length: 24:43
- Label: Nuclear Blast Records
- Producer: Sascha Paeth & Tobias Sammet

Avantasia chronology
Lost in Space (Part I) (2007)	Lost in Space (Part 2) (2007)	The Scarecrow (2008)

Lost in Space (Part 2) is an EP to the German Avantasia album The Scarecrow.

== Track listing ==
No.	Title	Length
1.	"Lost in Space"	3:52
2.	"Promised Land"	4:52
3.	"Dancing with Tears in My Eyes" (Ultravox cover)	3:53
4.	"Scary Eyes"	3:32
5.	"In My Defence" (Freddie Mercury cover)	3:58
6.	"Lost in Space" (Alive at Gatestudio)	4:36
Total length:		24:43

== Bonus features ==
1. The Road to Avantasia (Studio Report with interview)
2. Slideshow

== Personnel ==
- Tobias Sammet – Lead vocals, bass
- Sascha Paeth – Rhythm & lead guitars
- Eric Singer – Drums
- Michael "Miro" Rodenberg – Keyboards/Orchestration

=== Guest vocalists ===
- Jørn Lande (Track 2)
- Michael Kiske (Track 2)
- Amanda Somerville (Tracks 1, 6)

=== Guest musicians ===
- Henjo Richter – Additional lead guitars (Tracks 2, 3, 4)
