= The Scarecrow (album) =

Studio album by Avantasia
- Released: 25 January 2008
- Recorded: April – September 2007
- Studios: Gatestudio, Wolfsburg; Vox-Klangstudio, Hamburg
- Genre: Symphonic power metal
- Length: 63:43
- Label: Nuclear Blast
- Producers: Sascha Paeth & Tobias Sammet

Avantasia chronology
Lost in Space Part II (2007)	The Scarecrow (2008)	The Wicked Symphony (2010)

Professional ratings
Review scores
Source	Rating
Allmusic	3/5 stars
Metal Forces	8/10 stars
Metal Storm	8.5/10

The Scarecrow is the third full-length album by Tobias Sammet's German metal opera project Avantasia, released on 25 January 2008 through Nuclear Blast Records. It is the first part of "The Wicked Trilogy" and it is followed by The Wicked Symphony and Angel of Babylon. Sammet explained in a 2016 interview that he managed to have Alice Cooper after drummer Eric Singer asked him. Cooper requested to have a listen to the song first and then accepted to be part of it. Commenting on the album's 17th anniversary in January 2025, Sammet said The Scarecrow "laid the foundation of what Avantasia is today" and that it "marks the birth of Avantasia after our first tentative steps a few years before".

== Plot ==
The Scarecrow is a concept album about the tragic story of a lonesome creature, emotionally isolated from his environment and suffering from a distorted sensory perception. His feelings for the love of his life unrequited, he sets off on a journey exploring his left-hand path, striving for inner peace, ploughing his way to approval and eventually facing temptation at the inner depths of the human soul. The album was described as "an Icarus kind of story" by Sammet, as well as containing elements of Edward Scissorhands and Faust. The story continues on the albums The Wicked Symphony and Angel of Babylon.

== Track listing ==
All tracks are written by Tobias Sammet.

No.	Title	Guest Vocalist	Length
1.	"Twisted Mind"	Roy Khan	6:14
2.	"The Scarecrow"	Jørn Lande, Michael Kiske	11:12
3.	"Shelter from the Rain"	Kiske, Bob Catley	6:08
4.	"Carry Me Over"		3:52
5.	"What Kind of Love"	Amanda Somerville, Kiske	4:55
6.	"Another Angel Down"	Lande	5:41
7.	"The Toy Master"	Alice Cooper	6:20
8.	"Devil in the Belfry"	Lande	4:41
9.	"Cry Just a Little"	Catley	5:15
10.	"I Don't Believe in Your Love"	Oliver Hartmann	5:33
11.	"Lost in Space"	Somerville	3:52
Total length:			63:43

Korean edition bonus track
No.	Title	Length
12.	"The Toy Master" (Alternate Version)	6:19
13.	"I Don't Believe in Your Love (Alternative Version) (Bonus Track)"	5:30
14.	"Lost in Space (Feat. Michael Kiske) (Bonus Track)"	5:08

Bonus DVD
No.	Title	Length
1.	"Song by Song" (Interview)	13:27
2.	"Carry Me Over" (Music Video)	3:54
3.	"Carry Me Over" (Making of Music Video)	3:51
4.	"Lost in Space" (Electronic Press Kit)	4:12
5.	"Lost in Space" (Music Video)	3:49
6.	"I Don't Believe in Your Love" (Alternative Version)	5:30
7.	"The Toy Master" (Alternative Version)	6:19

== Personnel ==
- Tobias Sammet – vocals, bass guitar, additional keyboards
- Sascha Paeth – guitars
- Miro – keyboards, orchestration
- Eric Singer – drums

=== Guest vocalists ===
- Jørn Lande (tracks 2, 6, 8)
- Michael Kiske (track 2, 3, 5)
- Bob Catley (tracks 3, 9)
- Amanda Somerville (track 5)
- Alice Cooper (track 7)
- Roy Khan (track 1)
- Oliver Hartmann (track 10)

=== Guest musicians ===
- Henjo Richter – lead guitar (tracks 2, 3, 6, 7, 8)
- Kai Hansen – lead guitar (track 3)
- Rudolf Schenker – lead guitar (track 10)

=== Production ===
- Produced by Sascha Paeth & Tobias Sammet
- Recorded & Engineered by Chuck Garric, Sascha Paeth, Olaf Reitmeier & Mark Stuart
- Mixed & Mastered by Sascha Paeth

== Promo singles ==
- "Lost in Space" (2007)
- "Carry Me Over" (2007)

== Videos ==
The video for "Lost in Space" was released in 2007 with the release of the EPs of the same name. In December 2007, the video for "Carry Me Over" was released on Myspace. The Scarecrow's EPK (electronic press-kit) is available here on YouTube, courtesy of Tobias Sammet.

== Charts ==
Chart (2008)	Peak position
Austrian Albums (Ö3 Austria)	16
Dutch Albums (Album Top 100)	65
Finnish Albums (Suomen virallinen lista)	26
French Albums (SNEP)	57
German Albums (Offizielle Top 100)	8
Hungarian Albums (MAHASZ)	10
Italian Albums (FIMI)	65
Japanese Albums (Oricon)	49
Spanish Albums (Promusicae)	27
Swedish Albums (Sverigetopplistan)	10
Swiss Albums (Schweizer Hitparade)	17
UK Independent Albums (Official Charts)	29
UK Rock & Metal Albums (Official Charts)	30
