= The Metal Opera =

Studio album by Avantasia
- Released: 22 January 2001 (Europe); 10 July 2001 (U.S.)
- Recorded: October 1999 – June 2000
- Studio: Rhoen Studios, Germany
- Genre: Symphonic power metal
- Length: 59:12
- Label: AFM Records (Europe); Century Media Records (U.S.)
- Producer: Tobias Sammet, Norman Meiritz

Avantasia chronology
| Avantasia (single/EP) (2000) | The Metal Opera (2001) | The Metal Opera Part II (2002) |

Professional ratings
Review scores
| Source | Rating |
|---|---|
| Allmusic | 4/5 stars |

The Metal Opera is the first full-length album by Tobias Sammet's German supergroup project, Avantasia. It is a concept album and a metal opera. The album is followed by the sequel The Metal Opera Part II. Both were written over the course of a year, starting in the last quarter of 1998, and both were produced from October 1999 to June 2000, with the works being interrupted for some weeks so Sammet could produce The Savage Poetry with his other band Edguy.

The project claims that the album's title marked the first usage of the term "metal opera". Sammet also considers it his professional debut, since it marked the first time he actually made money from music, even though by that time he had already released three albums with Edguy.

According to Sammet, the album's plot is partly based on real witch trials in Fulda (his hometown) and Mainz held in the 16th and 17th centuries.

In 2019, Metal Hammer ranked it as the 25th best power metal album of all time. In 2021, they ranked it as the 18th best symphonic metal album.

== Track listing ==
All tracks are written by Tobias Sammet.

| No. | Title | Guest Vocalist | Length |
|---|---|---|---|
| 1. | "Prelude" (instrumental) | | 1:12 |
| 2. | "Reach Out for the Light" | Michael Kiske | 6:33 |
| 3. | "Serpents in Paradise" | David DeFeis | 6:16 |
| 4. | "Malleus Maleficarum" | Ralf Zdiarstek | 1:43 |
| 5. | "Breaking Away" | Michael Kiske | 4:35 |
| 6. | "Farewell" | Sharon den Adel, Michael Kiske | 6:33 |
| 7. | "The Glory of Rome" | Oliver Hartmann, Ralf Zdiarstek, Rob Rock | 5:29 |
| 8. | "In Nomine Patris" (instrumental) | | 1:04 |
| 9. | "Avantasia" | Michael Kiske | 5:32 |
| 10. | "A New Dimension" (instrumental) | | 1:39 |
| 11. | "Inside" | Andre Matos, Kai Hansen | 2:24 |
| 12. | "Sign of the Cross" | Oliver Hartmann, Kai Hansen, Rob Rock, Andre Matos | 6:26 |
| 13. | "The Tower" | Michael Kiske, Oliver Hartmann, David DeFeis, Timo Tolkki, Andre Matos | 9:45 |
| Total length: | | | 59:12 |

Note: "Malleus Maleficarum" is sampled from the song, "the Kingdom", by Tobias Sammet's other project, Edguy.

== Credits ==
- Tobias Sammet - Keyboards, Vocals (see "Singers")
- Henjo Richter - Guitars
- Markus Grosskopf - Bass guitar
- Alex Holzwarth - Drums

=== Guests ===
==== Musicians ====
- Guitar
  - Jens Ludwig (lead on tracks 12 & 13)
  - Norman Meiritz (acoustic on track 6)
- Keyboards
  - Frank Tischer (Piano on track 11)

==== Singers ====
- Gabriel Laymann – Tobias Sammet - tracks 2, 3, 5, 6, 7, 9, 11, 12 & 13
- Lugaid Vandroiy – Michael Kiske (credited as Ernie) - tracks 2, 5, 6, 9, & 13
- Friar Jakob – David DeFeis - tracks 3 & 13
- Bailiff Falk von Kronberg – Ralf Zdiarstek - tracks 4 & 7
- Anna Held – Sharon den Adel - track 6
- Bishop Johann von Bicken – Rob Rock - track 7 & 12
- Pope Clement VIII – Oliver Hartmann - tracks 7, 12 & 13
- Elderane the Elf – Andre Matos – tracks 11, 12 & 13
- Regrin the Dwarf – Kai Hansen - tracks 11 & 12
- Voice of the Tower – Timo Tolkki - track 13

== Charts ==
| Chart (2001) | Peak position |
|---|---|
| Finnish Albums (Suomen virallinen lista) | 36 |
| French Albums (SNEP) | 118 |
| German Albums (Offizielle Top 100) | 35 |
| Swedish Albums (Sverigetopplistan) | 48 |
