= Monuments (Edguy album) =

Compilation album by Edguy
- Released: 14 July 2017
- Genre: Power metal, heavy metal
- Length: 150:13 (compilation CDs)
- Label: Nuclear Blast
- Producer: Sascha Paeth, Edguy

Edguy chronology
| Space Police: Defenders of the Crown (2014) | Monuments (2017) |

Monuments is a compilation album by the German power metal band Edguy, released on 14 July 2017. The album was released as a two-CD/DVD package including 22 previously released songs, five new songs, and one previously unreleased song originally recorded in 1995 for the demo version of The Savage Poetry. The package also includes a two-hour DVD and a photobook. Frontman Tobias Sammet wrote one of the new songs on his own, while guitarists Jens Ludwig, Dirk Sauer and bassist Tobias Exxel co-wrote the others with him.

== Track listing ==
All lyrics are written by Tobias Sammet; all music is composed by Sammet, except where noted.

Compilation CD 1
| No. | Title | Music | Original album | Length |
|---|---|---|---|---|
| 1. | "Ravenblack" | | Monuments | 5:08 |
| 2. | "Wrestle the Devil" | Sascha Paeth, Tobias Exxel, Sammet | Monuments | 4:00 |
| 3. | "Open Sesame" | Jens Ludwig, Sammet | Monuments | 5:00 |
| 4. | "Landmarks" | Ludwig, Sammet | Monuments | 4:34 |
| 5. | "The Mountaineer" | Dirk Sauer, Sammet | Monuments | 3:57 |
| 6. | "9-2-9" | | Tinnitus Sanctus | 3:47 |
| 7. | "Defenders of the Crown" | | Space Police: Defenders of the Crown | 5:42 |
| 8. | "Save Me" | | Rocket Ride | 3:46 |
| 9. | "The Piper Never Dies" | | Hellfire Club | 10:10 |
| 10. | "Lavatory Love Machine" | | Hellfire Club | 4:23 |
| 11. | "King of Fools" | | Hellfire Club | 4:20 |
| 12. | "Superheroes" | | Rocket Ride | 3:19 |
| 13. | "Love Tyger" | | Space Police: Defenders of the Crown | 4:27 |
| 14. | "Ministry of Saints" | | Tinnitus Sanctus | 5:03 |
| 15. | "Tears of a Mandrake" | | Mandrake | 7:14 |
| Total length: | | | | 74:50 |

Compilation CD 2
| No. | Title | Music | Original album | Length |
|---|---|---|---|---|
| 1. | "Mysteria" | Ludwig, Sammet | Hellfire Club | 5:46 |
| 2. | "Vain Glory Opera" (feat. Hansi Kürsch) | | Vain Glory Opera | 6:09 |
| 3. | "Rock of Cashel" | | Age of the Joker | 6:18 |
| 4. | "Judas at the Opera" (feat. Michael Kiske) | | Superheroes (EP) | 7:19 |
| 5. | "Holy Water" | | King of Fools (EP) | 4:13 |
| 6. | "Spooks in the Attic" | | Superheroes (EP) | 4:03 |
| 7. | "Babylon" | | Theater of Salvation | 6:13 |
| 8. | "The Eternal Wayfarer" | | Space Police: Defenders of the Crown | 8:49 |
| 9. | "Out of Control" (feat. Hansi Kürsch) | Ludwig, Sammet, Sauer | Vain Glory Opera | 5:05 |
| 10. | "Land of the Miracle" | | Theater of Salvation | 6:33 |
| 11. | "Key to My Fate" | | Savage Poetry | 4:33 |
| 12. | "Space Police" | | Space Police: Defenders of the Crown | 6:03 |
| 13. | "Reborn in the Waste" (Previously unreleased) | | Savage Poetry | 4:19 |
| Total length: | | | | 75:23 |

Live DVD

1. "Mysteria"
2. "Under the Moon"
3. "Navigator"
4. "Wake Up the King"
5. "Land of the Miracle"
6. "Lavatory Love Machine"
7. "Vain Glory Opera"
8. "Fallen Angels"
9. "The Piper Never Dies"
10. "Babylon"
11. "King of Fools"
12. "Chalice of Agony" (Avantasia cover featuring André Matos)
13. "Tears of the Mandrake"
14. "Out of Control"

Video clips

1. "Love Tyger"
2. "Robin Hood"
3. "Two Out of Seven"
4. "Ministry of Saints"
5. "Superheroes"
6. "Lavatory Love Machine"
7. "King of Fools"
8. "All the Clowns"

Live CD 1
| No. | Title | Length |
|---|---|---|
| 1. | "Mysteria" |
| 2. | "Under the Moon" |
| 3. | "Navigator" |
| 4. | "Wake Up the King" |
| 5. | "Land of the Miracle" |
| 6. | "Lavatory Love Machine" |
| 7. | "Vain Glory Opera" |
| 8. | "Fallen Angels" |

Live CD 2
| No. | Title | Length |
|---|---|---|
| 1. | "The Piper Never Dies" |
| 2. | "Babylon" |
| 3. | "King of Fools" |
| 4. | "Chalice of Agony" (Avantasia cover featuring André Matos) |
| 5. | "Tears of a Mandrake" |
| 6. | "Out of Control" |

== Charts ==
| Chart (2017) | Peak position |
|---|---|
| Austrian Albums (Ö3 Austria) | 20 |
| Belgian Albums (Ultratop Flanders) | 195 |
| Belgian Albums (Ultratop Wallonia) | 105 |
| Czech Albums (ČNS IFPI) | 19 |
| French Albums (SNEP) | 177 |
| German Albums (Offizielle Top 100) | 6 |
| Japanese Weekly Albums (Oricon) | 107 |
| Spanish Albums (PROMUSICAE) | 70 |
| Swedish Albums (Sverigetopplistan) | 50 |
| Swiss Albums (Schweizer Hitparade) | 16 |
