= Hall of Flames =

Compilation album by Edguy
- Released: 2004
- Recorded: 1997–2001
- Genre: Power metal
- Length: 118:42
- Label: AFM Records

Hall of Flames is the first compilation album released by German power metal band Edguy in 2004. This album covers tracks from albums released by AFM Records.

The first disc serves as a compilation of songs since 1997. The second contains many rare tracks in both exclusive singles (the audio portion of the "La Marche des Gendarmes" music/video single) and live tracks.

== Track listing ==
=== Disc One ===
1. "Tears of a Mandrake" (Single Version) - 5:00 (from "Mandrake)
2. "Jerusalem" - 5:28 (from "Mandrake")
3. "Out of Control" - 5:03 (from "Vain Glory Opera")
4. "The Headless Game" - 5:29 (from "Theater of Salvation")
5. "Scarlet Rose" - 5:11 (from "Vain Glory Opera")
6. "Nailed to the Wheel" - 5:40 (from "Mandrake")
7. "Vain Glory Opera" - 6:10 (from "Vain Glory Opera")
8. "Theater of Salvation" - 12:24 (from "Theater of Salvation")
9. "Key to My Fate" (2000 Version) - 4:33 (from the re-recording of "The Savage Poetry")
10. "Deadmaker" - 5:18 (from "Kingdom of Madness")
11. "Land of the Miracle" - 6:32 (from "Theater of Salvation")
12. "Until We Rise Again" - 4:28 (from "Vain Glory Opera")
13. "The Unbeliever" - 5:47 (from "Theater of Salvation")

=== Disc Two ===
1. "The Devil and the Savant" - 5:29 (from the limited edition of "Mandrake")
2. "Wings of a Dream" (2001 Version) - 5:06 (from the single "Painting on the Wall")
3. "For a Trace of Life" - 4:11 (Japanese bonus track from "Theater of Salvation")
4. "But Here I Am" - 4:35 (from "Vain Glory Opera")
5. "La Marche des Gendarmes" - 2:48 (from French edition of "Mandrake")
6. "Avantasia" (Live) - 5:26 (from "Burning Down the Opera")
7. "Walk on Fighting" (Live) - 5:18 (Japanese bonus track from "Theater of Salvation")
8. "Wake up the King" (Live) - 6:14 (Japanese bonus track from "Burning Down the Opera")
9. "All the Clowns" (Music Video)
10. "The Headless Game" (Live video) - 8:46

== Personnel ==
- Tobias Sammet - Vocals, Bass (Disc 1: tracks 5, 7, 10, 12 - Disc 2: track 4)
- Tobias 'Eggi' Exxel - Bass (Disc 1: tracks 1, 2, 4, 6, 8, 9, 11, 13 - Disc 2: tracks 1–3, 5–8)
- Jens Ludwig - Lead Guitar (All tracks)
- Dirk Sauer - Rhythm Guitar (All tracks)
- Felix Bohnke - Drums (Disc 1: tracks 1, 2, 4, 6, 8, 9, 11, 13 - Disc 2: tracks 1–3, 5–8)
- Dominik Storch - Drums (Disc 1: track 10)
- Frank Lindenthal - Session Drums (Disc 1: tracks 3, 5, 7, 12 - Disc 2: track 4)
