= The Singles (Edguy album) =

Compilation album by Edguy
- Released: 17 November 2008
- Recorded: 2004, 2005
- Genre: Power metal, Hard rock
- Length: 60:24
- Label: Nuclear Blast Records

The Singles is a compilation album by German power metal band Edguy. It features all tracks (with the exception of the song "Reach Out") from the EP's King Of Fools and Superheroes and single Lavatory Love Machine on one disc. The compilation was released on 17 November 2008, the same day as Edguy's eighth studio album, Tinnitus Sanctus.

== Track listing ==
1. "Superheroes"
2. "Spooks In The Attic"
3. "Blessing In Disguise"
4. "Judas At The Opera" (feat. Michael Kiske)
5. "The Spirit" (Magnum cover)
6. "Superheroes" (epic version)
7. "Lavatory Love Machine"
8. "Lavatory Love Machine" (acoustic Version)
9. "I'll Cry for You" (Europe cover)
10. "King Of Fools" - 3:35
11. "New Age Messiah" - 6:00
12. "The Savage Union" - 4:15
13. "Holy Water" - 4:17
14. "Life And Times Of A Bonus Track" - 3:23

== Personnel ==
- Tobias Sammet - Lead vocals
- Tobias 'Eggi' Exxel - Bass Guitar
- Jens Ludwig - Lead Guitar
- Dirk Sauer - Rhythm Guitar
- Felix Bohnke - Drums
- Michael Kiske - Guest Vocals on "Judas At The Opera"

== Info ==
- Tracks 1–6, Superheroes EP
- Tracks 7–9, Lavatory Love Machine EP
- Tracks 10–14, King of Fools EP
