= Sascha Paeth =

German musician and record producer

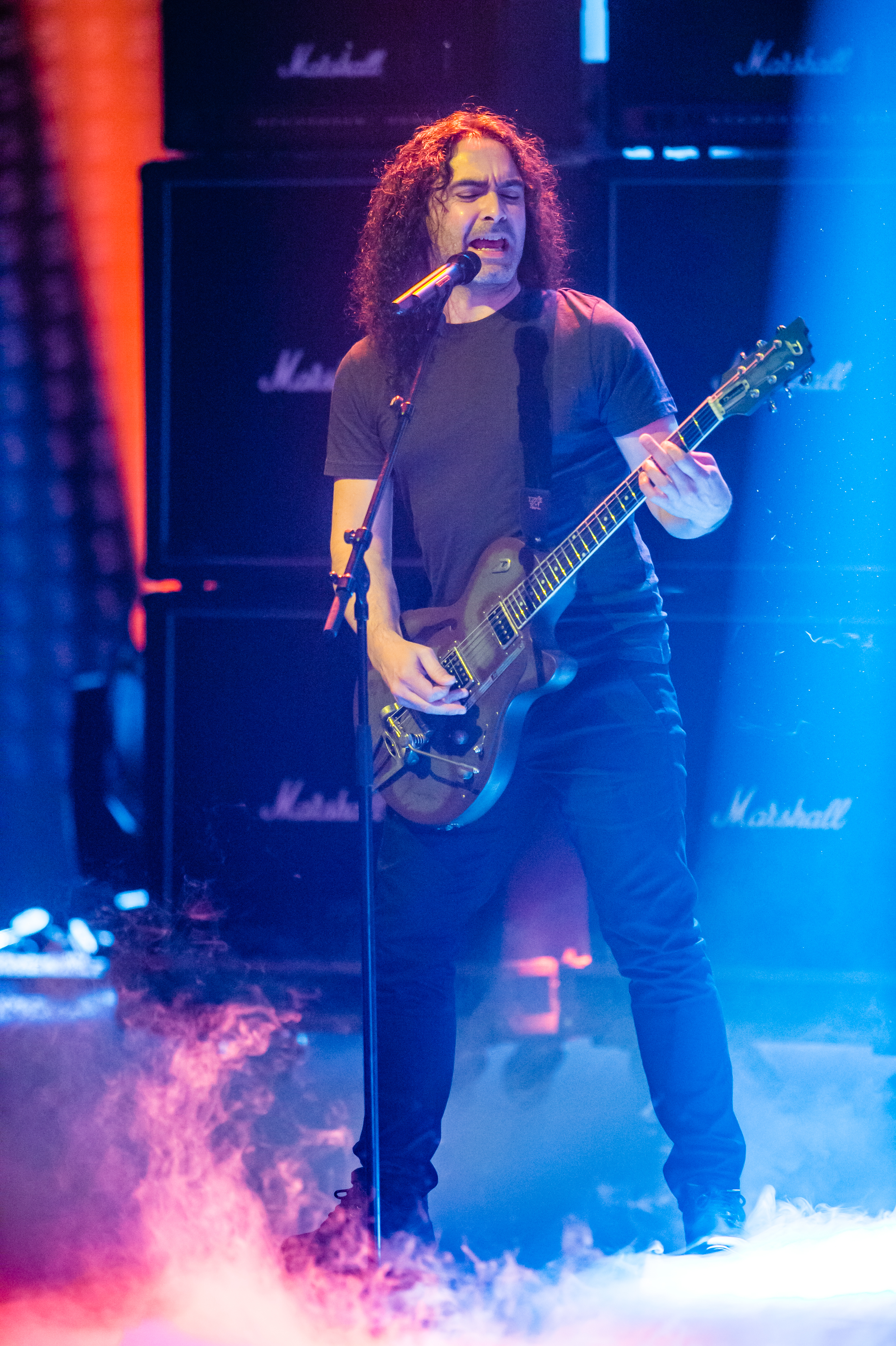
- Paeth performing with Avantasia in 2016

Background information
- Born: Sascha Paeth; 9 September 1970 (age 56); Wolfsburg, West Germany
- Genres: Heavy metal; hard rock; power metal; symphonic metal; progressive metal
- Occupations: Musician; record producer; sound engineer
- Instruments: Guitar; bass
- Years active: 1989–present
- Member of: Avantasia
- Formerly of: Heavens Gate; Aina

Sascha Paeth (born 9 September 1970) is a German guitarist, bassist, record producer and mixer known for working with heavy metal bands such as Avantasia, Edguy, Angra, Shaman, Rhapsody of Fire, Kamelot, After Forever and Epica. He owns the "Gate Studios", Wolfsburg previously used for recordings with his former band Heavens Gate.

Sascha Paeth has produced many albums along with Miro. In 2004, he produced Aina, a metal opera featuring a number of guests. In 2007, Paeth and Miro also helped to rebuild Tobias Sammet's metal opera Avantasia, producing the albums of The Wicked Trilogy (with Paeth being the main guitarist). He also assisted Sammet with putting together a band, enabling Avantasia to tour.

== Credits ==
Year	Artist	Album/Single	Role
1989	Heavens Gate	In Control	musician
1990	Heavens Gate	Open the Gate and Watch (EP)	musician
1991	Heavens Gate	Livin' in Hysteria	co-producer, musician
1992	Heavens Gate	More Hysteria (EP)	co-producer, musician
1992	Heavens Gate	Hell for Sale!	co-producer, musician
1992	Viper	Evolution	backing vocals
1992	Viper	Vipera Sapiens (EP)	backing vocals
1993	Heavens Gate	Live for Sale!	musician
1993	Angra	Angels Cry	producer with Charlie Bauerfeind, engineer, musician
1993	Gamma Ray	Insanity and Genius	engineer, musician
1994	Running Wild	Black Hand Inn	engineer, programming
1995	Gamma Ray	Land of the Free	musician
1996	Heavens Gate	Planet E.	producer with Miro, engineer, mixing, musician
1996	Angra	Holy Land	producer with Charlie Bauerfeind, engineer
1996	Angra	Freedom Call (EP)	producer with Charlie Bauerfeind, engineer
1997	Rhapsody	Legendary Tales	producer with Miro, engineer, mixing, musician
1998	Angra	Fireworks	keyboards and computer programming
1998	Rhapsody	Symphony of Enchanted Lands	producer with Miro, engineer, mixing, mastering, musician
1999	Kamelot	The Fourth Legacy	producer with Miro, engineer, mixing, mastering, musician
1999	Luca Turilli	King of the Nordic Twilight	producer with Miro, engineer, mixing, mastering, musician
1999	Heavens Gate	In the Mood (EP)	producer with Miro, engineer, mixing, mastering, musician
1999	Heavens Gate	Menergy	producer with Miro, engineer, mixing, mastering, musician
1999	Mob Rules	Savage Land	mixing, mastering
2000	Kamelot	The Expedition	producer, engineer, mixing, mastering
2000	Rhapsody	Dawn of Victory	producer with Miro, engineer, mixing, mastering
2000	Rhapsody	"Holy Thunderforce" (CD5")	producer with Miro, engineer, mixing, mastering
2000	Mob Rules	Temple of Two Suns	mixing, mastering, musician
2000	Avalon	Eurasia	producer, engineer, mixing, mastering
2000	Brainstorm	Ambiguity	mixing, mastering
2001	Kamelot	Karma	producer with Miro, engineer, mixing, mastering, musician
2001	Rhapsody	Rain of a Thousand Flames	producer with Miro, engineer, mixing, mastering
2001	Ambeon	Fate of a Dreamer	mastering
2001	Gun Barrel	Power Dive	mastering
2001	Virgo	Virgo	producer, engineer, mixing, mastering, musician
2001	Gigantor	Back to the Rockets!!!	engineer, mixing, mastering, musician
2001	Various Artists	Tribute to Helloween: Keeper of Jericho	musician
2002	Rhapsody	Power of the Dragonflame	producer with Miro, engineer, mixing, mastering, musician
2002	Luca Turilli	Prophet of the Last Eclipse	producer with Miro, engineer, mixing, mastering, musician
2002	Luca Turilli	Demonheart (EP)	producer with Miro, engineer, mixing, mastering, musician
2002	Shaman	Ritual	producer, engineer, mixing, musician
2002	At Vance	Only Human	mixing
2002	Avantasia	The Metal Opera Part II	engineer
2003	Kamelot	Epica	producer with Miro, engineer, mixing, mastering, musician
2003	Epica	The Phantom Agony	producer, engineer, mixing
2003	Aina	Days of Rising Doom	producer, engineer, mixing, songwriter, musician
2003	After Forever	Exordium (EP)	mixing
2003	Edguy	Burning Down the Opera	engineer
2003	Taraxacum	Rainmaker	mixing, mastering
2003	Galloglass	Legends from Now and Nevermore	mastering
2003	Invictus	Black Heart	mastering
2004	Gigantor	Giant Robot Spare Parts Vol. 1	co-producer, engineer
2004	Rhapsody	The Dark Secret (EP)	co-producer, engineer, mixing
2004	Rhapsody	Symphony of Enchanted Lands II: The Dark Secret	co-producer, engineer, mixing
2004	Lunatica	Fables & Dreams	producer, mixing, mastering
2004	After Forever	Invisible Circles	vocal producer with Miro, mixing
2004	Edguy	King of Fools (EP)	engineer
2004	Edguy	Hellfire Club	engineer
2004	Shaman	RituAlive	musician
2004	Heavenly	Dust to Dust	mixing, mastering
2004	Dol Ammad	Star Tales	drums producer and engineer
2004	Asrai	Touch in the Dark	engineer, mixing
2005	Epica	We Will Take You with Us	audio mixing
2005	Epica	Consign to Oblivion	producer with Olaf Reitmeier, engineer, mixing, musician
2005	Shaman	Reason	producer, engineer, mixing, mastering
2005	Kamelot	The Black Halo	producer with Miro, engineer, mixing, mastering
2005	Felony	First Works	engineer, mixing, mastering
2005	Epica	The Score – An Epic Journey	co-producer, engineer, mixing
2005	Rhapsody	"The Magic of the Wizard's Dream" (CD5")	co-producer, engineer, mixing
2005	After Forever	Remagine	vocal producer, engineer, mixing
2005	Edguy	Superheroes (EP)	producer, engineer, mixing, mastering
2005	Hartmann	Out in the Cold	producer with Oliver Hartmann, engineer, mixing, mastering
2006	Edguy	Rocket Ride	producer, engineer, mixing, mastering
2006	Lunatica	The Edge of Infinity	producer, engineer, mixing, mastering, composer
2006	Luca Turilli	The Infinite Wonders of Creation	co-producer, engineer, mixing, mastering, musician
2006	Luca Turilli's Dreamquest	Lost Horizons	co-producer, engineer, mixing, mastering, musician
2006	Rhapsody	Live in Canada 2005: The Dark Secret	producer, engineer, mixing
2006	Redkey	Rage of Fire	producer with Thomas Rettke, engineer, mixing, mastering, musician
2006	Kamelot	One Cold Winter's Night	mixing, mastering, musician
2006	Rhapsody of Fire	Triumph or Agony	co-producer, engineer, mixing, mastering
2007	Hartmann	Home	producer with Oliver Hartmann, engineer, mixing, mastering
2007	Kamelot	Ghost Opera	producer with Miro, engineer, mixing, mastering, musician
2007	Epica	The Divine Conspiracy	producer, engineer, mixing, mastering, vocal arrangements, backing vocals
2007	Andre Matos	Time to Be Free	producer with Roy Z, mixing
2007	Rhapsody of Fire	Visions from the Enchanted Lands (DVD)	producer, engineer, mixing
2007	Asrai	Pearls in the Dirt	producer, mixing, mastering, backing vocals
2007	Avantasia	Lost in Space Part I (EP)	producer with Tobias Sammet, engineer, mixing, mastering, musician
2007	Avantasia	Lost in Space Part II (EP)	producer with Tobias Sammet, engineer, mixing, mastering, musician
2008	Brainstorm	Downburst	producer with Miro, engineer, mixing
2008	Avantasia	The Scarecrow	producer with Tobias Sammet, engineer, mixing, mastering, musician
2008	Edguy	Tinnitus Sanctus	producer, engineer, mixing, mastering
2008	Symphonity	Voice from the Silence	mixing
2008	Hartmann	Handmade – Live in Concert	mastering
2008	Amanda Somerville	Windows	producer, engineer, mixing and mastering with Miro, musician
2009	Epica	The Classical Conspiracy	producer, mixing, mastering
2009	Brainstorm	Memorial Roots	co-producer with Miro, engineer, mixing
2009	Epica	Design Your Universe	producer, engineer, mixing, vocal lines author, backing vocals
2009	Andre Matos	Mentalize	producer, engineer, mixing, backing vocals
2009	Tribe	Pray for Calm... Need the Chaos	producer, engineer, mixing, mastering, arrangements
2009	Lunatica	New Shores	producer, engineer, mixing, mastering, arrangements, songwriter
2009	Edguy	Fucking with F***: Live	mixing, mastering
2009	Hartmann	3	producer with Oliver Hartmann, engineer, mixing
2009	Infinity Overture	Kingdom of Utopia	producer with Miro and Niels Vejlyt, mixing, mastering
2010	Avantasia	The Wicked Symphony	producer with Tobias Sammet, engineer, mixing, mastering, musician
2010	Avantasia	Angel of Babylon	producer with Tobias Sammet, engineer, mixing, songwriter, musician
2010	Kamelot	Poetry for the Poisoned	producer with Miro, engineer, mixing, mastering, musician
2010	Rhapsody of Fire	The Cold Embrace of Fear – A Dark Romantic Symphony (EP)	engineer, mixing, musician
2010	Rhapsody of Fire	The Frozen Tears of Angels	engineer, mixing, musician
2010	Catharsis	Светлый Альбомъ	producer, engineer, mixing
2010	Diabulus in Musica	Secrets	mastering
2011	Avantasia	The Flying Opera	co-producer, sound engineer, mixing, musician
2011	Edguy	Age of the Joker	producer, engineer, mixing, musician
2011	Rhapsody of Fire	From Chaos to Eternity	engineer, mixing
2011	MaYaN	Quarterpast	producer, engineer, mixing, mastering
2011	Beyond the Bridge	The Old Man and the Spirit	mastering
2011	Infinity Overture	The Infinite Overture Part 1	mixing, mastering
2011	Trillium	Alloy	musician, producer, engineer, mixing
2012	Epica	Requiem for the Indifferent	producer, engineer, mixing, vocal lines author
2012	Kamelot	Silverthorn	producer with Miro, engineer, mixing, mastering, musician
2013	Avantasia	The Mystery of Time	musician, producer, engineer, mastering
2013	Sascha Paeth	Hard on the Wind	musician, producer, engineer, mastering
2014	Edguy	Space Police: Defenders of the Crown	producer, engineer, mixing, mastering
2015	Beyond the Black	Songs of Love and Death	producer, musician
2015	Kamelot	Haven	producer, engineer
2016	Avantasia	Ghostlights	musician, producer, engineer, mixer
2016	Beyond the Black	Lost in Forever	producer
2016	Symphonity	King of Persia	mixing
2017	Ayreon	The Source	Recording engineer for Tobias Sammet's parts
2017	Exit Eden	Rhapsodies in Black	musician
2017	Seven Spires	Solveig	mixing and mastering with Miro
2018	Kamelot	The Shadow Theory	producer, engineer, musician, mixing
2018	Beyond the Black	Heart of the Hurricane	producer, mixing
2019	Avantasia	Moonglow	musician, producer, engineer, mixer
2019	Turilli / Lione Rhapsody	Zero Gravity (Rebirth and Evolution)	bass guitar on "Oceano"
2019	Sascha Paeth's Masters of Ceremony	Signs of Wings	
2020	Kamelot	I Am the Empire – Live from the 013	guest on "RavenLight", production, mixing, mastering
2021	Epica	Omega	songwriter
2021	Adrian Benegas	Diamonds in the Dark	musician, production, mixing, mastering
2021	Seven Spires	Gods Of Debauchery	mixing
2022	Shaman	Rescue	producer, engineer, musician
2022	Docker's Guild	The Mystic Technocracy – Season 2: The Age of Entropy	musician
2023	Kamelot	The Awakening	producer, engineer, musician
2023	Adrian Benegas	Arcanum: El Mantra Secreto de los Espíritus)	mixing, mastering
2024	Feline Melinda	Seven	mixing, mastering
2024	Xandria	Universal Tales	engineering
2025	Grailknights	Forever	producer
