= Lavatory Love Machine =

Single by Edguy
- Released: 14 June 2004
- Length: 16:47
- Label: Nuclear Blast Records
- Songwriter: Tobias Sammet

Edguy singles chronology
"Painting on the Wall" (2001)	"Lavatory Love Machine" (2004)

"Lavatory Love Machine" is a single taken from German power metal band Edguy's album Hellfire Club.

== Track listing ==
1. "Lavatory Love Machine" - 4:24
2. "Lavatory Love Machine" (Acoustic) - 4:35
3. "I'll Cry for You" (Europe cover) - 3:45
4. "Reach Out" - 4:05

The disc also contains a video clip of "Lavatory Love Machine."

== Personnel ==
- Tobias Sammet - Lead vocals
- Tobias 'Eggi' Exxel - Bass Guitar
- Jens Ludwig - Lead Guitar
- Dirk Sauer - Rhythm Guitar
- Felix Bohnke - Drums
- Frank Tischer - Piano on 'Reach Out'

== Info ==
- Except for the title track, all songs will be exclusive to this single.
- In Germany, the single was also available as a strictly limited digipak version with a pressing of 3.000 copies.
- Track 1-3 also appear on the compilation album The Singles.
- The Single peaked at #46 in the Swedish singles chart.
