= The Flying Opera =

2011 live album by Avantasia

Video by Avantasia
- Released: 18 March 2011
- Recorded: The Scarecrow World Tour, 2008
- Length: 206 min.
- Label: Nuclear Blast
- Director: Ronald Matthes

The Flying Opera

Live album by Avantasia
- Released: 18 March 2011
- Recorded: The Scarecrow World Tour, 2008
- Length: 115:40
- Label: Nuclear Blast
- Producers: Tobias Sammet & Sascha Paeth

Avantasia chronology
The Wicked Symphony/Angel of Babylon (2010)	The Flying Opera (2011)	The Mystery of Time (2013)

The Flying Opera is a boxed set containing two DVDs and two CDs by the German power metal band Avantasia, released in March 2011. Avantasia evolved from being a side-project of Edguy vocalist Tobias Sammet to a full-fledged band touring all over the world. The tracks of the set were recorded live during their first world tour in 2008, in support of the album The Scarecrow. The DVD contains also a documentary of the tour and various video clips.

A three-LPs Limited Edition live album of The Flying Opera was released by Nuclear Blast Records in October 2011, with a total of 10,000 copies being printed.

== Track listing ==
=== DVD ===
Disc 1 Live at Wacken Open Air 2008 (songs 1–4, 8, 11–13, 15) and Masters of Rock Festival 2008 (songs 5–7, 9–10, 14, 16).

1. "Twisted Mind"
2. "The Scarecrow"
3. "Another Angel Down"
4. "Prelude/Reach Out for the Light"
5. "Inside"
6. "No Return"
7. "The Story Ain’t Over"
8. "Shelter from the Rain"
9. "Lost In Space"
10. "I Don’t Believe in Your Love"
11. "Avantasia"
12. "Serpents in Paradise"
13. "Promised Land"
14. "The Toy Master"
15. "Farewell"
16. "Sign of the Cross/The Seven Angels (Medley)"

Disc 2

1. Around the World in 20 Days – The Movie (documentary)
2. "Lost in Space" (video clip)
3. "Carry Me Over" (video clip)
4. "Carry Me Over" (Making of the video clip)
5. "Dying for an Angel" (video clip)

=== CD ===
All tracks are written by Tobias Sammet.

CD 1
No.	Title	Length
1.	"Twisted Mind"	6:42
2.	"The Scarecrow"	11:53
3.	"Another Angel Down"	5:25
4.	"Prelude"	1:25
5.	"Reach Out for the Light"	6:23
6.	"Inside"	7:01
7.	"No Return"	5:03
8.	"The Story Ain’t Over"	5:29
9.	"Shelter from the Rain"	7:02
10.	"Lost in Space"	3:53

CD 2
No.	Title	Length
1.	"I Don't Believe in Your Love"	6:49
2.	"Avantasia"	5:08
3.	"Serpents in Paradise"	7:26
4.	"Promised Land"	5:37
5.	"The Toy Master"	6:26
6.	"Farewell"	6:14
7.	"Sign of the Cross/The Seven Angels (Medley)"	17:54

== Personnel ==
- Tobias Sammet - lead vocals
- Sascha Paeth - guitars
- Oliver Hartmann - guitars, backing vocals (lead vocals on tracks 10 and 16)
- Robert Hunecke-Rizzo - bass, backing vocals
- Miro - keyboards, backing vocals
- Felix Bohnke - drums
- Amanda Somerville - backing vocals (lead vocals on tracks 15 and 16)
- Cloudy Yang - backing vocals

Tour guests

- Jørn Lande - lead vocals on tracks 2, 3, 12, 13 and 16
- Andre Matos - lead vocals on tracks 4, 5, 6, 8 and 16
- Bob Catley - lead vocals on tracks 7, 8 and 16
- Kai Hansen - lead vocals on track 14 and 16
- Henjo Richter - guitar on track 14
