= Superheroes (EP) =

EP by Edguy

EP by Edguy
- Released: 18 October 2005
- Recorded: Gate Studio, Wolfsburg, Germany, 2005
- Genres: Power metal, hard rock
- Length: 26:04
- Label: Nuclear Blast
- Producers: Sascha Paeth & Edguy

Edguy EP chronology
King of Fools (2004)	Superheroes (2005)

Superheroes

Video by Edguy
- Released: 5 September 2005
- Genre: Power metal
- Length: 77 min.
- Label: Nuclear Blast

Edguy chronology
Superheroes (2005)	Fucking with F*** - Live (2009)

Superheroes is an EP by the German power metal band Edguy, released in 2005. On this EP, the band has moved away from the sound they had developed on their previous album Hellfire Club. The songs on "Superheroes" are much less akin to the band's native style of power metal, but tends towards the direction of hard rock.

In addition to the title track, which also appears on the band's 2006 album Rocket Ride, the EP includes 5 other tracks. The fourth track, an epic track titled "Judas at the Opera", is somewhat reminiscent to Tobias Sammet's project Avantasia. It also features vocals from Michael Kiske of Helloween and Avantasia fame. The fifth track is a cover of Magnum's song "The Spirit". The final track, a version of "Superheroes", is a slower version of the song with only orchestral backdrop and Tobias Sammet's singing.

The publication of the EP was preceded by the release of a five-track DVD, which included the video of the song "Superheroes", footage from a Brazilian show and documentaries shot on tour and during the recording of Rocket Ride. It was the first video album released by Edguy.

== Track listing ==
No.	Title	Length
1.	"Superheroes"	3:19
2.	"Spooks in The Attic"	4:03
3.	"Blessing in Disguise"	4:17
4.	"Judas at the Opera" (feat. Michael Kiske)	7:21
5.	"The Spirit" (Magnum cover)	3:50
6.	"Superheroes (epic version)"	3:09

== DVD Track listing ==
1. "Superheroes" (video clip)
2. "Mysteria" (live in Brazil)
3. "Under the Moon" (live in Brazil)
4. "Navigator" (live in Brazil)

Special features

- Superheroes - The Road Movie (including interviews with some of the bandmembers)
- Studio report
- Edguy slideshow
- Making of the "Superheroes" video

== Personnel ==
- Tobias Sammet - Lead vocals
- Tobias 'Eggi' Exxel - Bass
- Jens Ludwig - Lead Guitar
- Dirk Sauer - Rhythm Guitar
- Felix Bohnke - Drums
- Michael Kiske - Vocals on "Judas At The Opera"
