= Space Police: Defenders of the Crown =

Studio album by Edguy
- Released: 18 April 2014
- Recorded: November 2013 – January 2014 at Gatesudio, Wolfsburg
- Genre: Power metal, heavy metal
- Length: 54:26
- Label: Nuclear Blast
- Producer: Sascha Paeth & Edguy

Edguy chronology
Age of the Joker (2011)	Space Police: Defenders of the Crown (2014)	Monuments (2017)

Professional ratings
Review scores
Source	Rating
All About The Rock	link
Metal Traveller	Review

Space Police: Defenders of the Crown is the tenth studio album by the German power metal band Edguy. It was released on 18 April 2014 through Nuclear Blast. The cover art was unveiled on 1 February, and 15 days later, the band announced the track listing.

== Background and recording ==
The band's vocalist and frontman, Tobias Sammet, has promoted the album as the heaviest the band has ever done. It was composed over two months, with the band members working altogether at the same studio with producer Sascha Paeth. The band said of the album:

We have focused on what makes this band unique and recorded what we believe is going to be the strongest and heaviest album Edguy has ever recorded. [...] There is no doubt that this album is going to be the album Edguy will be measured against in the future.

In an interview, Tobias and lead guitarist Jens Ludwig explained that the title of the album is based on two of its tracks, because they thought both names would be suitable for the new work. According to Tobias, Defenders of the Crown is a reference to Edguy being the real "defender of the heavy metal crown", while Space Police sounded like Frank Zappa or David Bowie and is a title that most heavy metal bands would not use. In another interview, Tobias commented:

Because we couldn't decide which title was better, we just went with both. Does it make sense? No! Does it sound exciting: Hell, yes! Mission accomplished!

== Song information ==
The opening track "Sabre & Torch" (which received a lyric video on 17 March 2014 ) was written shortly after the 2013 Avantasia tour and refers to the attitude of the band, doing things that other weren't expecting. "We feel like explorers: We go where no man's been before, just armed with the sabre in one hand and a torch in the other..."

The co-title track "Space Police" was described by Tobias as "a track that really reflects what this band is all about. It’s crazy but powerful and very, very creative, catchy... It's got drive." According to him, the term "space police" is a metaphor for people who want to create and enforce laws on territories that should not be limited by rules. More specifically speaking, he criticizes people who try to tell rock bands what to do and what to say when musicians are actually willing to live above rules and without limitations.

The Space Cops lurk everywhere, in the corridors of power of the music industry, in the press, some are your ex-fans who loved you when you were an insider's tip, an underground act who hadn’t sold out yet. You know, childish bullshit...

Tobias described the single "Love Tyger" as a "tribute to himself". It describes the history of a guy who is brought to Earth by the Gods as a gift to mankind. Its guitar riff was conceived by Tobias himself and the song was thought of even before Age of the Joker, but Tobias decided not to include it in that album nor in Avantasia's The Mystery of Time, due to it being too "light-hearted".

"The Realms of Baba Yaga" was maybe the last song to be written for the album and is about a person that gives in to temptation to a point that they cannot control the situation anymore, using the folkloric witch as a metaphor. Tobias described its guitar solo as the best Ludwig has ever played.

"Rock Me Amadeus" is a cover of Austrian singer Falco. Tobias was first planning to make a cover of "Der Kommissar", but Sascha Paeth suggested he covered "Rock Me Amadeus" instead. It marks the first time Tobias raps and also the first German language song by the band and by him on an album.

"Do Me Like a Cavemen" was co-composed by Ludwig, but the song was subject of many discussions between him and Tobias, who were both unsatisfied with each other's musical inputs. "Shadow Eaters" was also co-composed by Ludwig and it's about the power of one's mind and what can be achieved when focusing on the elimination of negative thoughts.

"Alone in Myself" is about "the feeling of realizing that the world around you does not perceive things the way they should be perceived", and how one can be misunderstood for not finding the right words for expressing themselves.

The ending and longest track, "The Eternal Wayfarer", talks about the immortality of the soul, which Tobias says he's trying to find evidence of, but is yet to do so. The chorus of the song dates back to 2005–06, by the time of Avantasia's The Scarecrow first sessions.

The limited edition comes with four instrumental versions of regular edition tracks, one progressive version of "Space Police", and two bonus tracks: "England", a song about the United Kingdom and the likes of Steve Harris of Iron Maiden, Bob Catley of Magnum and Scotland's William Wallace; and "Aychim in Hysteria", which is lyrically a tribute to the band's live sound engineer and musically a tribute to British group Def Leppard, specifically to their Hysteria era.

== Reception ==
Space Police has been well received by critics. Writing for All About The Rock, Mark Booth said: "Tobias Sammet is a musical genius as he has proven that you don't have to be serious all the time but can write humorous songs that still are heavy, power and amazingly catchy but stick to the metal roots (like JUDAS PRIEST have done in the past etc) and Tobias is in league with musical genius Devin Townsend."

== Track listing ==
All tracks are written by Tobias Sammet, except tracks 7 and 8, co-composed by Jens Ludwig and track 6, written by Rob and Ferdi Bolland

No.	Title	Length
1.	"Sabre & Torch"	5:00
2.	"Space Police"	5:59
3.	"Defenders of the Crown"	5:39
4.	"Love Tyger"	4:26
5.	"The Realms of Baba Yaga"	6:06
6.	"Rock Me Amadeus" (Falco cover)	3:20
7.	"Do Me Like a Caveman"	4:09
8.	"Shadow Eaters"	6:08
9.	"Alone in Myself"	4:36
10.	"The Eternal Wayfarer"	8:50
Total length:		54:26

All tracks are written by Tobias Sammet, except track 7, co-composed by Jens Ludwig

Limited Edition bonus tracks
No.	Title	Length
1.	"England"	4:28
2.	"Aychim in Hysteria"	4:03
3.	"Space Police (progressive version)"	6:03
4.	"Space Police (instrumental version)"	6:01
5.	"Love Tyger (instrumental version)"	4:27
6.	"Defenders of the Crown (instrumental version)"	5:40
7.	"Do Me Like a Caveman (instrumental version)"	4:11
Total length:		34:53

== Personnel ==
Edguy

- Tobias Sammet – lead and backing vocals, keyboards
- Jens Ludwig – guitar
- Dirk Sauer – guitar
- Tobias "Eggi" Exxel – bass guitar
- Felix Bohnke - drums

Additional musicians

- Michael Rodenberg - additional keyboards
- Oliver Hartmann - backing vocals

Technical staff

- Sascha Paeth - producing, mixing, mastering, engineering
- Michael Rodenberg - mastering, engineering
- Ole Reitmeier, engineering
- Arne "The Schlagerpirat" Wiegand
- Dan Frazier - cover art
- Thomas Ewerhard - design & layout
- Alex Kuehr - photos

== Charts ==
Chart (2014)	Peak position
Austrian Albums (Ö3 Austria)	27
Belgian Albums (Ultratop Flanders)	190
Belgian Albums (Ultratop Wallonia)	105
Finnish Albums (Suomen virallinen lista)	12
French Albums (SNEP)	72
German Albums (Offizielle Top 100)	2
Scottish Albums (OCC)	88
Spanish Albums (PROMUSICAE)	59
Swedish Albums (Sverigetopplistan)	28
Swiss Albums (Schweizer Hitparade)	13
UK Albums (OCC)	82
UK Independent Albums (OCC)	10
UK Rock & Metal Albums (OCC)	1
