= Kingdom of Madness =

Kingdom of Madness may refer to:

- Kingdom of Madness (Edguy album), 1997
- Kingdom of Madness (Magnum album), 1978
- "Kingdom of Madness", a 2010 song by Freedom Call from the album Legend of the Shadowking
- Kingdom of Madness, a UK rock band founded by ex-Magnum keyboardist Mark Stanway
