= Children of Steel =

Children of Steel may refer to:

- Children of Steel (audio play), a Sarah Jane Adventures audio story
- Children of Steel (album), a 1994 album by Edguy
