= Age of the Joker =

- Cover art by Dan Frazier

Studio album by Edguy
- Released: 26 August 2011
- Recorded: Peppermint-Park, Hannover; Gate Studio, Wolfsburg, Germany, April–May 2011
- Genre: Power metal, hard rock
- Length: 65:34
- Label: Nuclear Blast
- Producer: Sascha Paeth

Edguy chronology
| Fucking with F*** – Live (2009) | Age of the Joker (2011) | Space Police: Defenders of the Crown (2014) |

Professional ratings
Review scores
| Source | Rating |
|---|---|
| AllMusic | 3/5 stars |
| Blabbermouth.net | 8/10 |
| Brave Words & Bloody Knuckles | 7.5/10 |
| The Metal Critic | 8.5/10 stars |
| Metal Hammer (GER) | 6/7 stars |
| Metal Storm | 7/10 stars |
| Time For Metal Magazin (GER) | 8.5/10 stars |

Age of the Joker is the ninth studio album by the German power metal band Edguy. It was released on 26 August 2011 through Nuclear Blast.

Alongside the normal release, a double disc digipak edition was also issued, featuring b-sides, single versions of two album songs, as well as a cover of the Slade hit "Cum on Feel the Noize". A music video was shot for "Robin Hood", featuring German comedian Bernhard Hoecker and parodying the film The Adventures of Robin Hood.

The album was listed at many charts throughout Europe, reaching No. 3 in Germany, No. 10 in Czech Republic, No. 13 in Switzerland, No. 30 in Austria and No. 63 in France.

== Critical reception ==
In a review for AllMusic, critic reviewer Jon O'Brien wrote: "Age of the Joker makes little concession to anything remotely close to the 21st century, but it's difficult to dislike a record that both wears its retro intentions so boldly on its sleeve and displays a sense of humor that's lacking in many of their fellow over-earnest hair metal revivalists."

== Track listing ==
All lyrics are written by Tobias Sammet except for "Cum on Feel the Noize" by Noddy Holder; all music is composed by Tobias Sammet except for "God Fallen Silent" by Jens Ludwig and "Cum on Feel the Noize" by Noddy Holder and Jim Lea.

| No. | Title | Length |
|---|---|---|
| 1. | "Robin Hood" | 8:24 |
| 2. | "Nobody's Hero" | 4:31 |
| 3. | "Rock of Cashel" | 6:18 |
| 4. | "Pandora's Box" | 6:45 |
| 5. | "Breathe" | 5:03 |
| 6. | "Two Out of Seven" | 4:27 |
| 7. | "Faces in the Darkness" | 5:22 |
| 8. | "The Arcane Guild" | 4:58 |
| 9. | "Fire on the Downline" | 5:47 |
| 10. | "Behind the Gates to Midnight World" | 8:56 |
| 11. | "Every Night Without You" | 4:52 |
| Total length: | | 65:34 |

Bonus Disc (Available on Special and Limited editions of the album)
| No. | Title | Length |
|---|---|---|
| 1. | "God Fallen Silent" | 5:04 |
| 2. | "Aleister Crowley Memorial Boogie" | 4:34 |
| 3. | "Cum on Feel the Noize" | 3:53 |
| 4. | "Standing in the Rain" | 4:02 |
| 5. | "Robin Hood [Single Version]" | 4:54 |
| 6. | "Two Out of Seven [Single Version]" | 3:39 |

== Personnel ==
Band members

- Tobias Sammet – lead and backing vocals
- Jens Ludwig – guitar, dobro guitar on track 4
- Dirk Sauer – guitar
- Tobias "Eggi" Exxel – bass guitar
- Felix Bohnke- drums

Additional musicians

- Miro Rodenberg – keyboards, orchestral arrangements
- Simon Oberender - Hammond B3
- Cloudy Yang, Gracia Sposito, Thomas Rettke, Oliver Hartmann - backing vocals

Production

- Sascha Paeth - producer, engineer, mixing, additional keyboards
- Olaf Reitmeier - engineer
- Simon Oberender - engineer, mastering

== Chart positions ==
Chart performance for Age of the Joker
| Chart (2011) | Peak position |
|---|---|
| Austrian Albums (Ö3 Austria) | 30 |
| Belgian Heatseekers (Ultratop Flanders) | 9 |
| Belgian Albums (Ultratop Wallonia) | 72 |
| Finnish Albums (Suomen virallinen lista) | 15 |
| French Albums (SNEP) | 98 |
| German Albums (Offizielle Top 100) | 3 |
| Italian Albums (FIMI) | 79 |
| Japanese Albums (Oricon) | 74 |
| Norwegian Albums (VG-lista) | 29 |
| Spanish Albums (Promusicae) | 44 |
| Swedish Albums (Sverigetopplistan) | 10 |
| Swiss Albums (Schweizer Hitparade) | 13 |
| UK Independent Albums (OCC) | 35 |
| UK Rock & Metal Albums (OCC) | 14 |
| US Top Heatseekers Albums (Billboard) | 22 |
