= Fucking with Fire: Live =

Live concert DVD and CD by German power metal band Edguy

Fucking with F***: Live

Video by Edguy
- Released: 20 April 2009
- Recorded: Credicard Hall in São Paulo, Brazil, 3 November 2006
- Genres: Heavy metal, power metal, hard rock
- Length: 190 min.
- Label: Nuclear Blast
- Directors: M. Rossi, Ronald Matthes
- Producer: Ronald Matthes

Edguy chronology
Tinnitus Sanctus (2008)	Fucking with F***: Live (2009)	Age of the Joker (2011)

Fucking with F*** Live

Live album by Edguy
- Released: 20 April 2009
- Recorded: Credicard Hall in São Paulo, Brazil, 3 November 2006
- Genres: Heavy metal, power metal
- Length: 98:05
- Label: Nuclear Blast
- Producer: Ronald Matthes

Edguy chronology
Tinnitus Sanctus (2008)	Fucking with F*** Live (2009)	Age of the Joker (2011)

Professional ratings
Review scores
Source	Rating
Dangerdog Music Reviews	4/5 stars
Metal Hammer (GER)	5/7 stars

Fucking with F*** - Live is a live concert DVD and CD by German power metal band Edguy. It is the band's second live album since Burning Down the Opera in 2003 and their first ever concert DVD, which was recorded during their Rocket Ride Tour in 2006 in São Paulo, Brazil. The album was also released as a double CD album and a 2CD and DVD set.

The album title takes its name from the song "Fucking with Fire (Hair Force One)" from the band's 2006 album Rocket Ride.

== Track list ==
DVD
No.	Title	Length
1.	"Catch of the Century"
2.	"Sacrifice"
3.	"Babylon"
4.	"Lavatory Love Machine"
5.	"Vain Glory Opera"
6.	"Land of the Miracle"
7.	"Fucking with Fire"
8.	"Superheroes"
9.	"Save Me"
10.	"Tears of a Mandrake"
11.	"Mysteria"
12.	"Avantasia"
13.	"King of Fools"
14.	"Out of Control"
15.	"Bonus Features: Road Movies; Interviews; Music Videos: King of Fools, Lavatory Love Machine, Superheroes, Ministry of Saints"

CD 1
No.	Title	Length
1.	"Catch of the Century"	5:01
2.	"Sacrifice"	9:15
3.	"Babylon"	11:02
4.	"Lavatory Love Machine"	4:22
5.	"Vain Glory Opera"	6:59
6.	"Land of the Miracle"	6:36
7.	"Fucking with Fire"	4:30
Total length:		47:45

CD 2
No.	Title	Length
1.	"Superheroes"	4:02
2.	"Save Me"	4:41
3.	"Tears of a Mandrake"	14:24
4.	"Mysteria"	7:06
5.	"Avantasia"	6:09
6.	"King of Fools"	6:44
7.	"Out of Control"	7:14
Total length:		50:20

== Personnel ==
Band members

- Tobias Sammet - vocals
- Jens Ludwig - guitar
- Dirk Sauer - guitar
- Tobias "Eggi" Exxel - bass
- Felix Bohnke - drums
