= Rocket Ride =

Studio album by Edguy
- Released: 20 January 2006
- Recorded: 2005
- Studio: Gate Studio, Wolfsburg, Germany
- Genre: Power metal, progressive metal, hard rock
- Length: 60:03
- Label: Nuclear Blast
- Producer: Sascha Paeth and Edguy

Edguy chronology
Hellfire Club (2004)	Rocket Ride (2006)	Tinnitus Sanctus (2008)

Professional ratings
Review scores
Source	Rating
Allmusic	3.5/5 stars
Hardcore Sounds	4/5 stars
Sputnikmusic	1.5/5 stars
Blabbermouth.net	7.5/10 stars
Metal Hammer (GER)	6/7 stars

Rocket Ride is the seventh full-length album by German power metal band Edguy, released on 20 January 2006. It features a style that differs from their usual power metal style and is more oriented towards hard rock.

In Europe, the limited first edition was released as a digibook, featuring a photographic history of the group with formerly unreleased pictures from their early days and the bonus live track: "Land of the Miracle".

== Track listing ==
All lyrics are written by Tobias Sammet; all music is composed by Tobias Sammet, except "Out of Vogue" by Sammet, Jens Ludwig

No.	Title	Length
1.	"Sacrifice"	8:01
2.	"Rocket Ride"	4:47
3.	"Wasted Time"	5:48
4.	"Matrix"	4:09
5.	"Return to the Tribe"	6:06
6.	"The Asylum"	7:38
7.	"Save Me"	3:47
8.	"Catch of the Century"	4:02
9.	"Out of Vogue"	4:36
10.	"Superheroes"	3:19
11.	"Trinidad"	3:28
12.	"Fucking with Fire (Hair Force One)"	4:22
13.	"Land of the Miracle" (Live in Brazil) (Limited edition bonus track)	5:49
14.	"Reach Out" (Japanese bonus track)	4:05
15.	"Lavatory Love Machine" (Acoustic version) (Japanese bonus track)	4:37

The vinyl release also contained the tracks "Spooks in the Attic", "Blessing In Disguise", "Judas at the Opera", and "The Spirit" from the previously released Superheroes EP.

== Personnel ==
Band members

- Tobias Sammet – vocals
- Jens Ludwig – guitar
- Dirk Sauer – guitar
- Tobias "Eggi" Exxel – bass guitar
- Felix Bohnke – drums

Additional musicians

- Miro Rodenberg – keyboards, orchestral arrangements
- Amanda Somerville, Oliver Hartmann, Ralf Zdiarstek, Thomas Rettke – backing vocals

Production

- Sascha Paeth – producer, engineer, mixing, mastering
- Philip Colodetti, Olaf Reitmeier – engineers
