= Heavens Gate (band) =

German heavy metal band

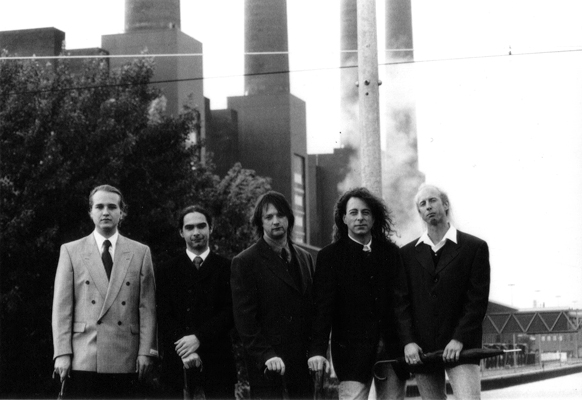

Background information
- Also known as: Steeltower (1982–1987)
- Origin: Wolfsburg, Lower Saxony, Germany
- Genres: Power metal, heavy metal
- Years active: 1982–1999
- Labels: No Remorse, NEMS Enterprises, SPV
- Past members: Thomas Rettke; Sascha Paeth; Bonny Bilski; Robert Hunecke-Rizzo; Thorsten Müller; Ingo Millek; Bernd Kaufholz; Manni Jordan

Heavens Gate was a German power metal band from Wolfsburg. They were, together with German bands Helloween, Gamma Ray, Grave Digger, Running Wild, and Rage, the pioneers in German power metal, taking their influences mainly from Helloween as well as from Judas Priest.

They started out as a band called Steeltower in 1982, releasing their first record Night of the Dog in 1984.

Before signing with No Remorse records, they were known under the name of Carrion and several of their songs ended up re-worked on their debut album In Control. They changed their name to Heavens Gate in 1987. Their first record as Heavens Gate was released in 1989.

Heavens Gate were taken under the wing of Frank Bornemann (Eloy) and soon after releasing In Control, they were embraced by the German metal audience and had an enthusiastic response in Japan.

They also did a metal cover of "Always Look on the Bright Side of Life" by Monty Python, from the movie The Life of Brian, for the Hell for Sale! album.

The band reunited for a live performance at the Rock Hard Festival in Athens, Greece on 13 September 2025.

== Members ==
=== Last known lineup ===
- Thomas Rettke – vocals (1982–1999)
- Sascha Paeth – guitars (1987–1999)
- Bonny Bilski – guitars (1986–1999)
- Robert Hunecke-Rizzo – bass (1996–1999)
- Thorsten Müller – drums (1982–1999)

=== Former members ===
- Bernd Kaufholz – guitars (1982–1986)
- Ingo Millek – guitars (1982–1987)
- Manni Jordan – bass (1987–1995; died 2023)

== Discography ==
=== Studio albums ===
- Night of the Dog – 1984 (As Steeltower)
- In Control – 1989
- Livin' in Hysteria – 1991
- Hell for Sale! – 1992
- Planet E. – 1996
- Menergy – 1999

=== Live albums ===
- Live for Sale! – 1993

=== EPs ===
- Open the Gate and Watch! – 1990
- More Hysteria – 1992
- In the Mood – 1997

=== Compilations ===
- Boxed – 1999
- Best for Sale! – 2015
