= Dan Frazier (artist) =

American artist (born 1945)

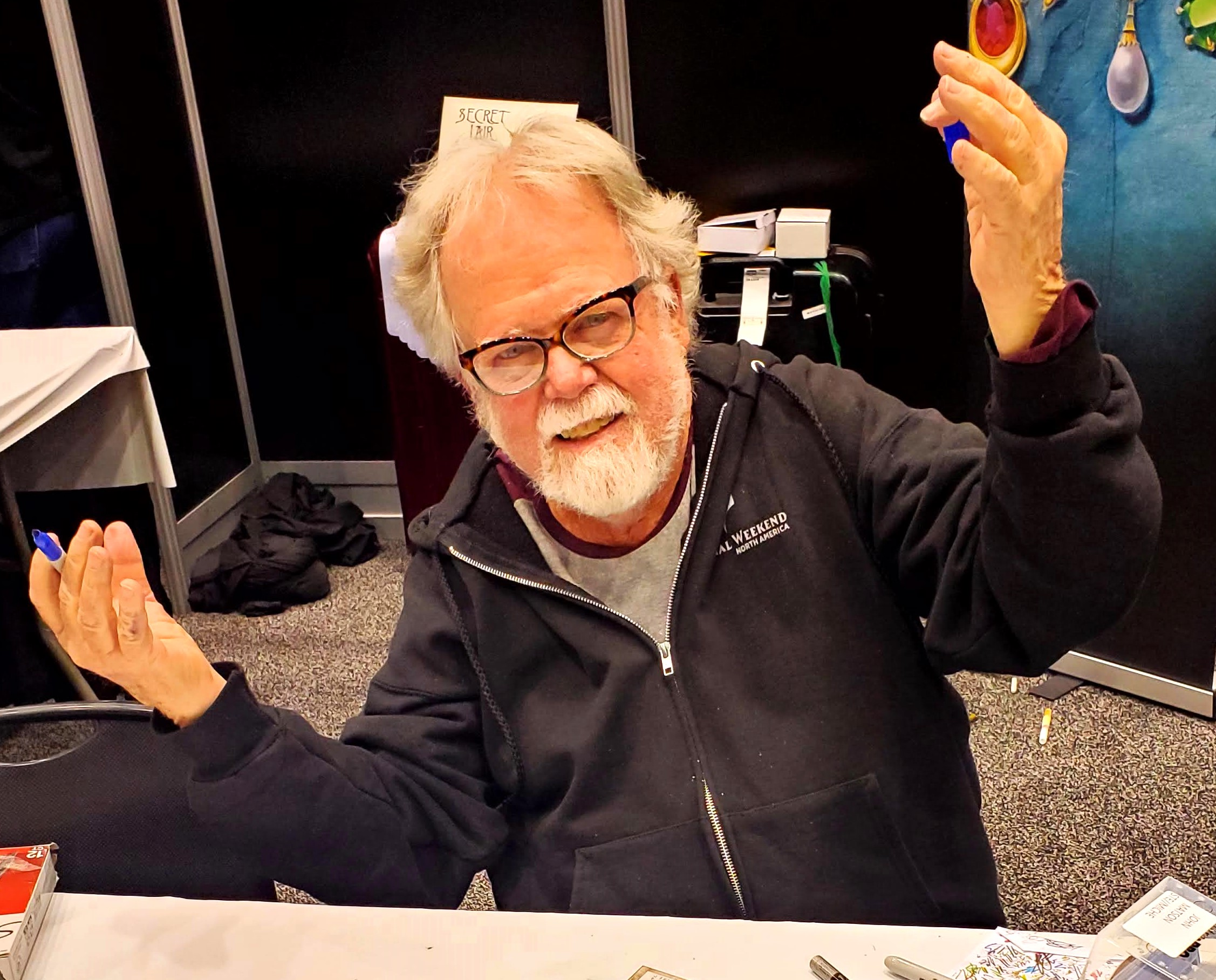
- Frazier at MagicCon Chicago in 2024
- Born: September 28, 1945
- Known for: Fantasy art

Dan Frazier (born September 28, 1945) is an artist whose work has appeared in role-playing games.

== Early life and education ==
Dan Frazier received his BFA at the University of Colorado Boulder and remained there, teaching art in the public schools. After 20 years, he left the teaching profession and started illustration in the gaming industry in 1990.

== Career ==
Dan Frazier did the original cover illustration for the Vampire: The Masquerade role-playing game but White Wolf replaced this with a photograph of a rose. Frazier is known for his work on the Magic: The Gathering card game as one of the twenty-five original artists. His Dungeons & Dragons work includes Book of Artifacts (1993) and Races of the Dragon (2006). He also created the cover artwork of 2014 Edguy album Space Police: Defenders of the Crown.
