= Felix Bohnke =

German musician and drummer

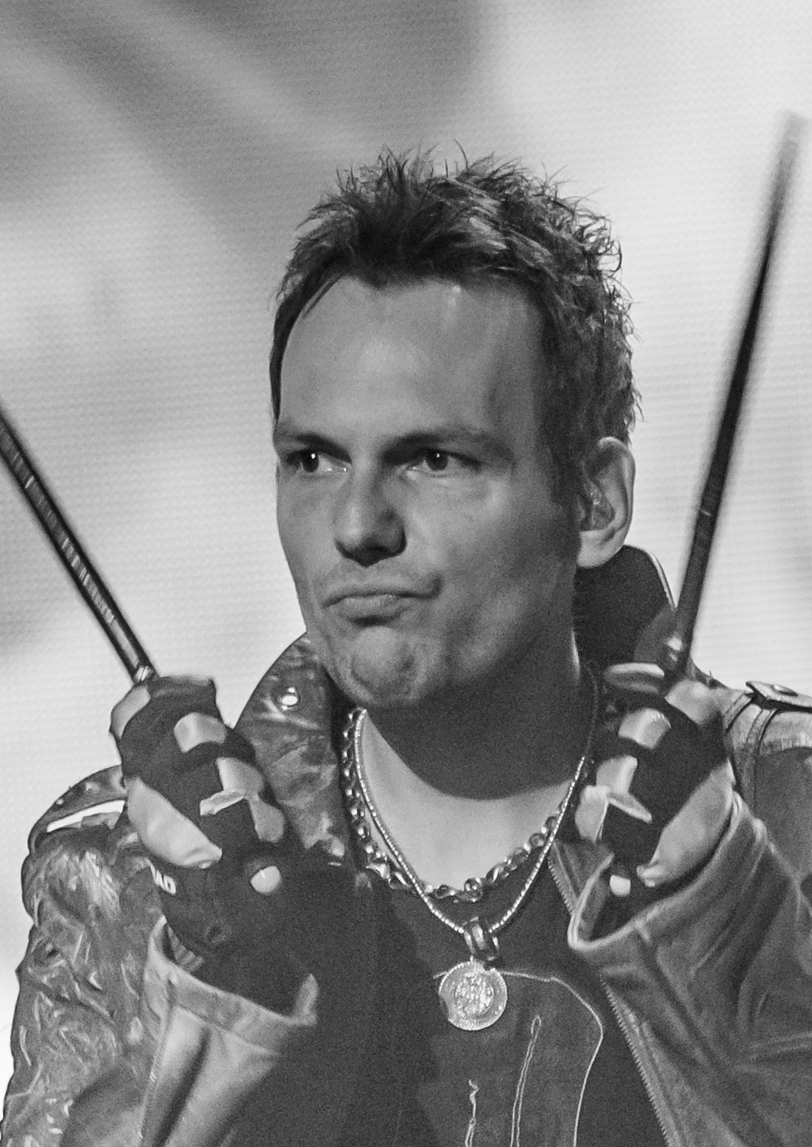
- Bohnke performing with Avantasia in 2016

Background information
- Born: 2 September 1974 (age 51); Germany
- Occupation: Musician
- Instrument: Drums
- Years active: 1998–present
- Website: felixbohnke.de

Felix Bohnke (born 2 September 1974) is a German musician and the drummer of heavy metal bands Edguy and Avantasia. He joined the band just before they recorded the album Theater of Salvation in 1998. Before joining Edguy he was a member of German band Saints & Preachers. In 2001, he was a guest drummer and later in 2003, a member of the band Taraxacum along with Edguy bassist Tobias Exxel.

Fellow band members (and some fans) refer to him as "Alien Drum Bunny," referenced in the song "Save Us Now" from the album Mandrake. This is also the reason that his drum solo on the live album Burning Down the Opera is called the "Solitary Bunny Drum Solo". He was the live drummer for Edguy vocalist Tobias Sammet's project Avantasia during their 2008, 2010 and 2013 world tours and recorded some tracks on the 2010 albums The Wicked Symphony and Angel of Babylon.

In 2015, Bohnke was invited to be the drummer of melodic rock project Khymera, led by bassist/vocalist/producer Dennis Ward. He recorded drums for their album titledThe Grand Design.

In 2016, he was announced as the permanent drummer for Avantasia, recording all tracks on the album Ghostlights and the following 2019 album Moonglow. Between touring with Avantasia on their 2019 Moonglow World Tour, Felix joined fellow Avantasia touring member Geoff Tate as the live drummer in his band Operation: Mindcrime.

== Discography ==
=== Edguy ===
- Theater of Salvation (1999)
- The Savage Poetry (2000)
- Mandrake (2001)
- Burning Down the Opera (2003)
- King of Fools (EP) (2004)
- Hellfire Club (2004)
- Superheroes (EP) (2005)
- Rocket Ride (2006)
- Tinnitus Sanctus (2008)
- Fucking with Fire – Live (2009)
- Age of the Joker (2011)
- Space Police: Defenders of the Crown (2014)
- Monuments (2017)

=== Taraxacum ===
- Spirit of Freedom (2001)
- Rainmaker (2003)

=== Avantasia ===
- The Wicked Symphony (2010)
- Angel of Babylon (2010)
- The Flying Opera (live album) (2011)
- Ghostlights (2016)
- Moonglow (2019)
- A Paranormal Evening with the Moonflower Society (2022)

=== Khymera ===
- The Grand Design (2015)
