= Angel of Babylon =

Studio album by Avantasia
- Released: 3 April 2010
- Recorded: 2008–2009
- Studios: Gatesudio, Wolfsburg; Vox-Klangstudio, Bendestorf
- Genre: Symphonic power metal
- Length: 58:59
- Labels: Nuclear Blast, Fearless, Bodog
- Producers: Sascha Paeth & Tobias Sammet

Avantasia chronology
The Wicked Symphony (2010)	Angel of Babylon (2010)	The Flying Opera (2011)

Angel of Babylon is the fifth full-length album by Tobias Sammet's German metal opera project Avantasia, released on 3 April 2010, along with The Wicked Symphony. Angel Of Babylon was released both as part of a box set, with the two albums combined and as an individual album. It is the third and final part of "The Wicked Trilogy".

== Track listing ==
All tracks are written by Tobias Sammet, except "Symphony of Life", written by Sascha Paeth.

No.	Title	Guest Vocalist	Length
1.	"Stargazers"	Jørn Lande, Russell Allen, Michael Kiske, Oliver Hartmann	9:31
2.	"Angel of Babylon"	Jørn Lande	5:28
3.	"Your Love Is Evil"	Tobias Sammet	3:55
4.	"Death Is Just a Feeling"	Jon Oliva	5:24
5.	"Rat Race"	Jørn Lande	4:07
6.	"Down in the Dark"	Jørn Lande	4:25
7.	"Blowing Out the Flame"	Tobias Sammet	4:50
8.	"Symphony of Life"	Cloudy Yang	4:31
9.	"Alone I Remember"	Jørn Lande	4:46
10.	"Promised Land"	Jørn Lande	4:50
11.	"Journey to Arcadia"	Russell Allen, Bob Catley	7:12
Total length:			58:59

Japanese Edition
No.	Title	Length
12.	"Twisted Mind" (Live at Masters of Rock 2008)	7:01
Total length:		66:00

== Personnel ==
- Tobias Sammet - lead vocals, bass guitar, keyboards
- Sascha Paeth - guitars, keyboards, producer
- Eric Singer - drums (on tracks 5, 7, 9, 10)
- Miro - keyboards, orchestration

=== Guests ===
==== Musicians ====
- Guitars
  - Bruce Kulick (on tracks 5, 9, 11)
  - Oliver Hartmann (on tracks 1, 2, 3)
  - Henjo Richter (on track 10)
- Drums
  - Felix Bohnke (on tracks 4, 6, 8)
  - Alex Holzwarth (on tracks 1, 2, 3, 11)
- Keyboards
  - Jens Johansson (on track 2)
- Organ
  - Simon Oberender (on track 9)

==== Singers ====
- Jørn Lande (on tracks 1, 2, 5, 6, 9, 10)
- Russell Allen (on tracks 1, 11)
- Michael Kiske (on track 1)
- Jon Oliva (on track 4)
- Bob Catley (on track 11)
- Cloudy Yang (on track 8)
- Oliver Hartmann (on track 1)

== Charts ==
Chart (2010)	Peak position
Greek Albums (IFPI)	11
Hungarian Albums (MAHASZ)	18
Swedish Albums (Sverigetopplistan)	37
