= Livin' in Hysteria =

- Cover art by Richard Corben

Studio album by Heavens Gate
- Released: April 2, 1991
- Recorded: Horus Sound Studio, Hannover, Germany, November 1990 – February 1991
- Genre: Heavy metal, power metal
- Length: 44:53
- Label: No Remorse
- Producer: Charlie Bauerfeind, Sascha Paeth, Thomas Rettke

Heavens Gate chronology
In Control (1989)	Livin' in Hysteria (1991)	Hell for Sale! (1992)

Livin' in Hysteria is the second album by Heavens Gate, released on April 2, 1991, by No Remorse Records and later reissued by SPV GmbH.

== Track listing ==
All lyrics are written by Rettke, except 5 is instrumental.; all music is composed by Bilski, Paeth & Rettke, except 5 by Paeth.

Standard edition
No.	Title	Length
1.	"Livin` in Hysteria"	4:38
2.	"We Got the Time"	4:32
3.	"The Neverending Fire"	5:29
4.	"Empty Way to Nowhere"	4:51
5.	"Fredless"	2:20
6.	"Can`t Stop Rockin`"	5:21
7.	"Flashes"	3:22
8.	"Best Days of My Life"	5:52
9.	"We Want It All"	3:53
10.	"Gate of Heaven"	4:35

== Personnel ==
Band members

- Thomas Rettke – lead vocals, co-producer
- Sascha Paeth – guitar, co-producer
- Bonny Bilski – guitar
- Manni Jordan – bass
- Thorsten Müller – drums

Additional musicians

- Miro - piano on "The Best Days of my Life"

Production

- Charlie Bauerfeind - producer, engineer, mixing
- Richard Corben - cover art
- Miro - co-arrangement
