= Star Tales =

Studio album by Dol Ammad
- Released: November 30, 2004
- Recorded: at Theeta Studio in Thessaloniki, Greece
- Length: 61:59
- Label: Black Lotus Records
- Producer: Argy Stream; Thanasis Lightbridge

Dol Ammad chronology
Electronic Art Metal (2002)	Star Tales (2004)	Ocean Dynamics (2006)

Professional ratings
Review scores
Source	Rating
Allmusic	4/5 stars

Star Tales is the debut album by the Greek electronic/operatic metal band Dol Ammad. The album features a 12-piece choir of six men and six women called the Europa Choir that performed all the vocal duties.

== Track listing ==
1. "Dreamport" - 3:11
2. "Eclipse (Corona of the Sun)" - 4:09
3. "Weaver's Dance" - 7:47
4. "Boxed Daylight Part 1" - 2:57
5. "Boxed Daylight Part 2" - 3:00
6. "The Veil (Seven Face Danger)" - 5:24
7. "Back to the Zone" - 4:24
8. "Master of All" - 5:47
9. "The Hill of Hope" - 7:16
10. "Kruug" - 3:06
11. "Vortex 3003" - 4:58
12. "Mission Butterfly" - 10:00

== Personnel ==
=== Line-up ===
- Thanasis Lightbridge - synthesizers
- Alex Holzwarth - drums
- Jimmy Wicked - guitars
- Nick Terry - bass

==== Europa Choir ====
- Kortessa Tsifodimou - soprano vocals
- Alexandra Voulgari - soprano vocals
- Zoe Tsokanou - soprano vocals
- Marieta Panagiotidou - alto vocals
- Vicky Alexaki - alto vocals
- Maria Stolaki - alto vocals
- Panos Iampoultakis - tenor vocals
- Themis Mpasdekis - tenor vocals
- Alexandros Barmpas - tenor vocals
- Kyriakos Chouvardas - bass vocals
- Petros Moraitis - bass vocals
- Yiannis Tsalouhidis - bass vocals

=== Credits ===
- Thanasis Lightbridge - music composition and arrangement, lyrics, production, layout, art direction
- Sascha Paeth - drum recording and production
- Olaf Reitmeier - drum recording and production
- Brian Exton - artwork
- Angelos Zymaras - photography
- Stamatis Kritikos - layout, art direction
