= Kingdom of Madness (Edguy album) =

Studio album by Edguy
- Released: 8 February 1997
- Recorded: Phoenix Studio, Herne, Germany
- Genre: Power metal
- Length: 59:15
- Label: AFM
- Producer: Edguy & Erik Grösch

Edguy chronology
Savage Poetry (demo) (1995)	Kingdom of Madness (1997)	Vain Glory Opera (1998)

Professional ratings
Review scores
Source	Rating
Allmusic	3/5 stars
Sputnikmusic	3/5 stars
Metal Hammer (GER)	6/7 stars

Kingdom of Madness is the second album by the German power metal band Edguy, released in 1997. It is usually referred to as their "official" debut album since it was the first to be professionally recorded and to receive record company distribution.

== Track listing ==
All lyrics by Tobias Sammet. Music as indicated.

1. "Paradise" (Sammet, Jens Ludwig) – 6:24
2. "Wings of a Dream" (Sammet) – 5:24
3. "Heart of Twilight" (Sammet, Ludwig) – 5:32
4. "Dark Symphony" (Sammet, Ludwig) – 1:05
5. "Deadmaker" (Sammet, Ludwig) – 5:15
6. "Angel Rebellion" (Sammet, Ludwig) – 6:44
7. "When a Hero Cries" (Sammet) – 3:59
8. "Steel Church" (Sammet, Ludwig, Dominik Storch) – 6:29
9. "The Kingdom" (Sammet) – 18:23

== Personnel ==
Band members

- Tobias Sammet – vocals, bass, piano, keyboards
- Jens Ludwig – guitar
- Dirk Sauer – guitar
- Dominik Storch – drums

Additional musicians

- Chris Boltendahl (from Grave Digger) - guest vocals on track 9

Production

- Erik Grösch - producer, engineer
- Ralph Hubert - engineer
