= Hellfire Club (album) =

2004 album by Edguy

Studio album by Edguy
- Released: 15 March 2004
- Recorded: Rohen Studios, Fulda, Vox Clangstudio, Hamburg, Gate Studio, Wolfsburg, Germany, 2004
- Genre: Heavy metal, power metal
- Length: 61:07
- Label: Nuclear Blast
- Producer: Edguy

Edguy chronology
Burning Down the Opera (2003)	Hellfire Club (2004)	Rocket Ride (2006)

Professional ratings
Review scores
Source	Rating
Metal Storm	(10/10)
Metal Hammer (GER)	6/7 stars

Hellfire Club, released on 15 March 2004, is the sixth album by German power metal band Edguy. The music of the band is supported by a German orchestra, the Deutsches Filmorchester Babelsberg. It is the band's first album released via Nuclear Blast.

== Track listing ==
All lyrics are written by Tobias Sammet; all music is composed by Sammet, except where noted.

No.	Title	Lyrics	Music	Length
1.	"Mysteria"		Sammet, Jens Ludwig	5:44
2.	"The Piper Never Dies"			10:05
3.	"We Don't Need a Hero"			5:30
4.	"Down to the Devil"			5:27
5.	"King of Fools"			4:21
6.	"Forever"			5:40
7.	"Under the Moon"		Sammet, Ludwig	5:04
8.	"Lavatory Love Machine"			4:25
9.	"Rise of the Morning Glory"			4:39
10.	"Lucifer in Love" (rearranged from "Down to the Devil")	instrumental		0:32
11.	"Navigator"		Sammet, Ludwig	5:22
12.	"The Spirit Will Remain"			4:12

Bonus tracks
No.	Title	Music	Length
13.	"Children of Steel"		4:03
14.	"Mysteria" (alt. version ft. Mille Petrozza)	Sammet, Ludwig	5:32

Bonus track — Japanese release
No.	Title	Music	Length
15.	"Heavenward" ("Navigator" demo version)	Sammet, Ludwig	5:17

Hong Kong bonus disc
No.	Title	Music	Length
1.	"New Age Messiah" (King of Fools EP)		6:00
2.	"Children of Steel" (King of Fools EP)		4:04
3.	"Mysteria" (alt. version ft. Mille Petrozza)	Sammet, Ludwig	5:32
4.	"The Savage Union" (King of Fools EP)		4:15
5.	"Falling Down" (alternative version)		4:37
6.	"Holy Water" (King of Fools EP)		4:17
7.	"Introduction" (live)		1:01
8.	"Tears of a Mandrake" (live)		7:55
9.	"Painting on the Wall" (live)		4:39
10.	"Inside" (live, Avantasia cover)		4:17
11.	"Fairytale" (live)		6:22
12.	"Life and Times of a Bonus Track" (King of Fools EP)		3:23
13.	"Heavenward" ("Navigator" demo)	Sammet, Ludwig	5:16

This bonus disk was only released in Hong Kong.

== Personnel ==
=== Band members ===
- Tobias Sammet: lead and backing vocals, keyboards
- Jens Ludwig: guitar, backing vocals
- Dirk Sauer: guitar, backing vocals
- Tobias 'Eggi' Exxel: bass, backing vocals
- Felix Bohnke: drums

=== Additional musicians ===
- Mille Petrozza: co-lead vocals on the alt. version of "Mysteria"
- Michael Rodenberg: keyboards, orchestral arrangements
- Amanda Somerville, Oliver Hartmann, Ralf Zdiarstek, Thomas Rettke, Daniel Schmitt: backing vocals
- The Deutsches Filmorchester Babelsberg conducted by Matthias Suschke

=== Production ===
- Norman Mieritz, Sascha Paeth: engineers
- Michael Schubert: orchestra recordings
- Mikko Karmila: mixing
- Mika Jussila: mastering at Finnvox Studios, Helsinki

=== Others ===
- JP Fournier: cover art
- Thomas Ewerhard: cover art layout
- Alex Kuehr: principal photographer
- Claudia Vaihinger, Markus Bergmann, Ronny Schönebaum, Sabine Nania: assistants to principal photographer
