= The Wicked Symphony =

Studio album by Avantasia
- Released: 3 April 2010
- Recorded: 2008–2009
- Studios: Gatesudio, Wolfsburg; Vox-Klangstudio, Bendestorf; Peppermint Park Studio, Hanover
- Genre: Symphonic power metal
- Length: 60:37
- Label: Nuclear Blast
- Producers: Sascha Paeth & Tobias Sammet

Avantasia chronology
The Scarecrow (2008)	The Wicked Symphony (2010)	Angel of Babylon (2010)

The Wicked Symphony is the fourth full-length album by Tobias Sammet's German metal opera project Avantasia, released on 3 April 2010, parallel with Angel of Babylon. The Wicked Symphony was released both as part of a box set, with the two albums combined and as an individual album. It is the second part of "The Wicked Trilogy" and it is followed by Angel of Babylon.

Tobias Sammet describes the title track in his own words, "a ten minute track featuring a vocal battle between Jørn Lande, Russell Allen and me".

Professional ratings
Review scores
Source	Rating
About.com	4/5 stars
Allmusic	3.5/5 stars
Metal Storm	8.2/10

== Track listing ==
All tracks are written by Tobias Sammet.

No.	Title	Guest Vocalist	Length
1.	"The Wicked Symphony"	Jørn Lande, Russell Allen	9:29
2.	"Wastelands"	Michael Kiske	4:44
3.	"Scales of Justice"	Tim "Ripper" Owens	5:03
4.	"Dying for an Angel"	Klaus Meine	4:32
5.	"Blizzard on a Broken Mirror"	Andre Matos	6:08
6.	"Runaway Train"	Bob Catley, Lande, Kiske	8:43
7.	"Crestfallen"	Lande	4:03
8.	"Forever Is a Long Time"	Lande	5:05
9.	"Black Wings"	Ralf Zdiarstek	4:39
10.	"States of Matter"	Allen	3:58
11.	"The Edge"		4:12
Total length:			60:37

Japanese Edition bonus track
No.	Title	Length
12.	"Lost in Space" (Live at Masters of Rock 2008)	4:20
Total length:		64:57

== Personnel ==
- Tobias Sammet – Lead vocals, Bass guitar, Keyboards, Organ (on tracks 6, 8)
- Sascha Paeth – Guitars, Keyboards, Bass guitar (on track 10) Producer
- Eric Singer – Drums (on tracks 2, 4, 6)
- Miro – Keyboards, Orchestration

=== Guests ===
==== Musicians ====
- Guitar
  - Bruce Kulick (on tracks 6, 11)
  - Oliver Hartmann (on tracks 2, 7, 8)
- Drums
  - Felix Bohnke (on tracks 1, 5, 9, 11)
  - Alex Holzwarth (on tracks 3, 7, 8, 10)
- Organ
  - Simon Oberender (on track 11)

==== Singers ====
- Jørn Lande (on tracks 1, 6–8)
- Michael Kiske (on track 2, 6)
- Russell Allen (on tracks 1, 10)
- Klaus Meine (on track 4)
- Tim "Ripper" Owens (on track 3)
- Bob Catley (on track 6)
- Andre Matos (on track 5)
- Ralf Zdiarstek (on track 9)

== Charts ==
Chart (2010)	Peak position
Austrian Albums (Ö3 Austria)	9
Finnish Albums (Suomen virallinen lista)	49
German Albums (Offizielle Top 100)	2
Greek Albums (IFPI)	11
Hungarian Albums (MAHASZ)	28
Japanese Albums (Oricon)	49
Swedish Albums (Sverigetopplistan)	38
UK Independent Albums (Official Charts)	29
