= Tinnitus Sanctus =

Studio album by Edguy
- Released: 14 November 2008
- Recorded: Gate Studios, Wolfsburg, Germany, May–September 2008
- Genre: Hard rock, progressive metal
- Length: 53:29
- Label: Nuclear Blast
- Producer: Sascha Paeth

Edguy chronology
Rocket Ride (2006)	Tinnitus Sanctus (2008)	Fucking with Fire – Live (2009)

Professional ratings
Review scores
Source	Rating
Allmusic	3/5 stars
Blabbermouth.net	7/10 stars
Metal Hammer (GER)	6/7 stars

Tinnitus Sanctus is the eighth studio album by German heavy/power metal band Edguy, released on 14 November 2008 on Nuclear Blast. This album combines progressive-oriented hard rock heard on their previous album Rocket Ride with elements of speed metal.

The album was released in several formats. The standard edition was issued in a jewel case and included the 10 album tracks and a bonus track. A digipak edition included the album with the bonus track, and a bonus live CD, recorded in Los Angeles during the Rocket Ride tour. A mailorder edition, available exclusively through the Nuclear Blast webshop, was issued in a tin case. A double LP version was also available.

Initial press reaction to the album was positive, with Tanja Weinekötter of Fury calling it "the strongest Edguy album so far", whilst frontman Tobias Sammet felt that it "could be the album we'll be measured by in the future".

A video was shot for the track "Ministry of Saints" in Belgrade, Serbia.

== Track listing ==
All tracks are written by Tobias Sammet.

No.	Title	Length
1.	"Ministry of Saints"	5:02
2.	"Sex Fire Religion"	5:57
3.	"The Pride of Creation"	5:28
4.	"Nine Lives"	4:26
5.	"Wake Up Dreaming Black"	4:05
6.	"Dragonfly"	4:56
7.	"Thorn Without a Rose"	4:46
8.	"9-2-9"	3:48
9.	"Speedhoven"	7:42
10.	"Dead or Rock"	4:59
11.	"Aren't You a Little Pervert Too?!" (bonus track feat. Granato Rambocco And The Killers)	2:20
Total length:		53:29

Bonus CD: Live in Los Angeles
No.	Title	Length
1.	"Catch of the Century"	5:13
2.	"Sacrifice"	8:23
3.	"Babylon"	7:29
4.	"Lavatory Love Machine"	4:24
5.	"Tears of a Mandrake"	7:42
6.	"Vain Glory Opera"	6:26
7.	"Superheroes"	3:24
8.	"Fucking with Fire"	4:37
9.	"Avantasia"	6:57
10.	"King of Fools"	5:25
Total length:		60:00

== Personnel ==
Band members

- Tobias Sammet - vocals
- Jens Ludwig - guitar
- Dirk Sauer - guitar
- Tobias "Eggi" Exxel - bass
- Felix Bohnke - drums

Additional musicians

- Miro Rodenberg - keyboards
- Oliver Hartmann, Thomas Rettke, Claudia Boots-Zimmermann - backing vocals

Production

- Sascha Paeth - producer, engineer, mixing, mastering
- Miro Rodenberg - engineer, mastering
- Simon Oberender, Olaf Reitmeier - engineers
