= Dol Ammad =

- Origin: Thessaloniki, Greece
- Genres: Avant-garde metal, electronica, symphonic metal
- Years active: 2000-present
- Labels: Black Lotus, Electronicartmetal
- Members: Thanasis Lightbridge; Alex Holzwarth; Dim; Nick Terry; Supporting Choir
- Past members: Jimmy Wicked
- Website: www.dolammad.com

Dol Ammad is a heavy metal band formed in 2000 by Greek keyboard player Thanasis Lightbridge. Dol Ammad uses many different instruments and the vocal support of a fourteen-member four-part choir. Lightbridge describes his music as "electronica art metal" and cites electronic music pioneers Jean Michel Jarre and Vangelis as key influences. The band derives its name from a fuel refinery in the computer game Descent 3.

== Lineup ==
=== Current members ===
==== Band ====
- Thanasis Lightbridge - synthesizers
- Alex Holzwarth (also formerly of Rhapsody of Fire) - drums and percussion
- Dim - electric guitar
- Nick Terry - bass guitar

==== Choir ====
- Soprano - Mary Palaska, Kortessa Tsifodimou, Alexandra Voulgari
- Alto - Vicky Alexaki, Sofia Patsi, Maria Stolaki, Ntina Strani
- Tenor - Alexandros Barmpas, Panos Iampoultakis, Themis Mpasdekis, Anestis Papageorgiou
- Bass - Kyriakos Chouvardas, Petros Moraitis, Yiannis Tsalouhidis

==== Sound engineer ====
- argystream - argy papageorgiou

=== Guests ===
- D. C. Cooper (Silent Force, Royal Hunt) - vocals (Ocean Dynamics)

=== Former members ===
==== Band ====
- Jimmy Wicked - guitar (Star Tales, Demo)

==== Choir ====
- Zoe Tsokanou, soprano (Star Tales, Demo)
- Marieta Pangiotidou, alto (Star Tales, Demo)

== Discography ==
- Demo No. 1 EP (2001)
- Demo EP (2002)
- Star Tales (2004)
- Ocean Dynamics (2006)
- Winds Of The Sun (2010)
- Cosmic Gods: Episode I - Hyperspeed (2012)
- Cosmic Gods: Episode II - Astroatlas (2018)
