= King of Fools (EP) =

EP by Edguy
- Released: 10 February 2004
- Genre: Power metal, progressive metal
- Length: 21:30
- Label: Nuclear Blast

Edguy EP chronology
King of Fools (2004)	Superheroes (2005)

King of Fools, released in 2004, is an EP by German power metal band Edguy. In addition to the title track, which appears on the album Hellfire Club, the EP includes four non-album tracks.

== Track listing ==
1. "King of Fools" (Edit Version) - 3:35
2. "New Age Messiah" - 6:00
3. "The Savage Union" - 4:15
4. "Holy Water" - 4:17
5. "Life and Times of a Bonus Track" - 3:23

== Personnel ==
- Tobias Sammet - Lead vocals
- Tobias 'Eggi' Exxel - Bass Guitar
- Jens Ludwig - Lead Guitar
- Dirk Sauer - Rhythm Guitar
- Felix Bohnke - Drums
