= Burning Down the Opera =

Live album by Edguy
- Released: 26 August 2003
- Recorded: Mandrake Tour European leg, 2001-2002
- Genre: Power metal
- Length: 103:33
- Label: AFM
- Producer: Edguy

Edguy chronology
Mandrake (2001)	Burning Down the Opera (2003)	Hellfire Club (2004)

Professional ratings
Review scores
Source	Rating
Allmusic	3/5 stars
Metal Hammer (GER)	6/7 stars

Burning Down the Opera, released on 26 August 2003, is the first live album by the German power metal band Edguy recorded in Europe during their Mandrake World Tour.

A Limited Edition digibook is also available that includes a 32 pages expanded booklet with 130+ photos, all lyrics and a detailed venue list of the world tour 2001/2002 which took place on 5 continents. On top of that, a video clip of the Progpower festival in the USA will be provided as well as a desktop wallpaper and screen saver.

== Track listing ==
CD one

1. "Welcome to the Opera (Intro)" - 2:08
2. "Fallen Angels" - 5:33
3. "Tears of a Mandrake" - 7:24
4. "Babylon" - 7:01
5. "Land of the Miracle" - 5:44
6. "Painting on the Wall" - 4:37
7. "Wings of a Dream" - 6:04
8. "The Headless Game" - 7:20
9. "The Pharaoh" - 15:07

CD two

1. "Vain Glory Opera" - 6:27
2. "Solitary Bunny (Drum Solo)" - 3:14
3. "Save Us Now" - 4:53
4. "How Many Miles" - 10:58
5. "Inside" - 3:22
6. "Avantasia" - 5:23
7. "Out of Control" - 8:15

== Personnel ==
Band members

- Tobias Sammet - lead vocals
- Jens Ludwig - lead and rhythm guitar, backing vocals
- Dirk Sauer - lead and rhythm guitar, backing vocals
- Tobias 'Eggi' Exxel - bass, backing vocals
- Felix Bohnke - drums

Production

- Michael Tibes - live engineer, mixing
- Marc Schettler - live engineer
- Sascha Paeth - additional engineering
- Mika Jussila - mastering at Finnvox Studios, Helsinki
