= Vain Glory Opera =

Studio album by Edguy
- Released: 15 January 1998
- Recorded: 1997, Toxic Beat Studio, Fulda, Germany
- Genre: Power metal
- Length: 51:31
- Label: AFM
- Producer: Edguy, Andy Allendörfer, Nils Wasko

Edguy chronology
Kingdom of Madness (1997)	Vain Glory Opera (1998)	Theater of Salvation (1999)

Professional ratings
Review scores
Source	Rating
Allmusic	4/5 stars
Metal Hammer (GER)	6/7 stars

Vain Glory Opera is the third (or second "official") studio album by the German power metal band Edguy, released in 1998. It was mixed by Stratovarius' Timo Tolkki, who also played additional lead guitar on "Out Of Control", and featured additional lead and backing vocals by Hansi Kürsch of Blind Guardian on "Out of Control" and the title track "Vain Glory Opera." Further choir vocals were supplied by Ralf Zdiarstek and Norman Meiritz. At the time of recording the album, Edguy had not yet chosen a permanent drummer to succeed Dominik Storch, so session musician Frank Lindenthal, a good friend of the band, was asked to play drums on the album.

"Hymn" is a cover version of the song from the album Quartet (1982) by the British new wave band Ultravox.

== Track listing ==
All lyrics are written by Sammet, except where indicated; all music is composed by Sammet, except where indicated.

No.	Title	Writer(s)	Length
1.	"Overture"		1:32
2.	"Until We Rise Again"		4:27
3.	"How Many Miles"	music: Edguy	5:39
4.	"Scarlet Rose"		5:10
5.	"Out of Control"	music: Edguy	5:03
6.	"Vain Glory Opera"		6:08
7.	"Fairytale"	music: Edguy	5:09
8.	"Walk on Fighting"	music: Edguy	4:44
9.	"Tomorrow"		3:52
10.	"No More Foolin'"	music: Edguy	4:54
11.	"Hymn" (Ultravox cover)	Midge Ure, Billy Currie, Chris Cross, Warren Cann	4:53

Japanese bonus track
No.	Title	Length
12.	"But Here I Am"	4:33

Anniversary Edition bonus tracks
No.	Title	Length
12.	"But Here I Am"	4:33
13.	"Vain Glory Opera" (live)	6:28
14.	"Out of Control" (live)	8:14

== Personnel ==
Band members

- Tobias Sammet – vocals, bass, keyboards
- Jens Ludwig – guitars
- Dirk Sauer – guitars

Additional musicians

- Frank Lindenthal – drums
- Ralf Zdiarstek, Norman Meiritz, Andy Allendörfer – backing vocals
- Hansi Kürsch – additional vocals on tracks 5 and 6
- Timo Tolkki – guitar solo on track 5

Production

- Andy Allendörfer, Nils Wasko - executive producers
- Norman Meiritz - engineer
- Timo Tolkki - mixing
- Mika Jussila - mastering at Finnvox Studios, Helsinki
