= Theater of Salvation =

Studio album by Edguy
- Released: 25 January 1999
- Recorded: Rhoen Studios, Fulda, Germany, 1998
- Genre: Power metal; neoclassical metal
- Length: 63:18
- Label: AFM
- Producer: Edguy

Edguy chronology
Vain Glory Opera (1998)	Theater of Salvation (1999)	The Savage Poetry (2000)

Professional ratings
Review scores
Source	Rating
AllMusic	4.5/5 stars
The Metal Crypt	4.25/5 stars
Metal Storm	9.5/10
Rock Hard	9/10

Theater of Salvation is the fourth (or third "official") studio album by German heavy metal band Edguy, released in 1999. It is the first to feature drummer Felix Bohnke and bass player Tobias Exxel. The album reached No. 50 in the Swedish Albums Chart.

== Track listing ==
All lyrics are written by Tobias Sammet; all music is composed by Sammet, except where noted

No.	Title	Music	Length
1.	"The Healing Vision"		1:11
2.	"Babylon"		6:09
3.	"The Headless Game"		5:31
4.	"Land of the Miracle"		6:32
5.	"Wake up the King"		5:43
6.	"Falling Down"		4:35
7.	"Arrows Fly"	Sammet, Jens Ludwig	5:03
8.	"Holy Shadows"		4:30
9.	"Another Time"		4:07
10.	"The Unbeliever"	Sammet, Ludwig	5:47
11.	"Theater of Salvation"		12:25

Japanese bonus tracks
No.	Title	Length
12.	"For a Trace of Life"	4:13
13.	"Walk on Fighting" (live)	5:40
14.	"Fairytale" (live)	6:22

== Personnel ==
=== Band members ===
- Tobias Sammet - lead and backing vocals, keyboards
- Jens Ludwig - guitar, backing vocals
- Dirk Sauer - guitar, backing vocals
- Tobias 'Eggi' Exxel - bass guitar
- Felix Bohnke - drums

=== Additional musicians ===
- Frank Tischer - piano and keyboards
- Daniel Gallmarini - piano on track 9
- Markus Schmitt, Ralf Zdiarstek, Mark Laukel, Uwe Ruppel, Timo Ruppel - backing vocals

=== Production ===
- Norman Meiritz, Frank Tischer - engineers
- Mikko Karmila - mixing
- Bernd Steinwedel - mastering
- Adrian Maleska - cover art
