= Mandrake (album) =

Studio album by Edguy
- Released: 24 September 2001
- Recorded: Rhoen Studios, Fulda, Germany
- Genre: Power metal
- Length: 60:05; 69:38 (Special Edition)
- Label: AFM
- Producer: Edguy

Edguy chronology
The Savage Poetry (2000)	Mandrake (2001)	Burning Down the Opera (2003)

Professional ratings
Review scores
Source	Rating
Sputnikmusic	4/5 stars
Metal Storm	(8.9/10)
Metal Hammer (GER)	6/7 stars

Mandrake is the fifth album by German power metal band Edguy, released in 2001. It is a varied album, exploring many styles of the power metal genre. It was their last studio album for AFM Records. They later signed a contract with Nuclear Blast.

In 2017, Loudwire ranked it as the 20th best power metal album of all time.

== Track listing ==
All lyrics are written by Tobias Sammet; all music is composed by Sammet, except where noted.

No.	Title	Music	Length
1.	"Tears of a Mandrake"		7:12
2.	"Golden Dawn"	Jens Ludwig, Sammet	6:07
3.	"Jerusalem"	Ludwig, Sammet	5:27
4.	"All the Clowns"		4:48
5.	"Nailed to the Wheel"	Ludwig, Sammet	5:40
6.	"The Pharaoh"		10:37
7.	"Wash Away the Poison"		4:40
8.	"Fallen Angels"		5:13
9.	"Painting on the Wall"		4:36
10.	"Save Us Now"		4:34

Limited edition bonus tracks
No.	Title	Length
11.	"The Devil and the Savant"	5:26
12.	"Wings of a Dream 2001"	5:03

== Personnel ==
=== Band members ===
- Tobias Sammet – lead and backing vocals, keyboards, organ
- Jens Ludwig – guitars, backing vocals
- Dirk Sauer – guitars, backing vocals
- Tobias 'Eggi' Exxel – bass, backing vocals
- Felix Bohnke – drums

=== Additional musicians ===
- Ralf Zdiarstek, Markus Schmitt, Daniel Schmitt, Rob Rock – backing vocals
- Frank Tischer – piano on track 7

=== Production ===
- Norman Meieritz – engineer
- Mikko Karmila – mixing
- Mika Jussila – mastering
