= The Savage Poetry =

Studio album by Edguy
- Released: 25 June 2000
- Recorded: 1995 (demo), 2000
- Studio: Rhoen Studios, Fulda, Germany
- Genre: Power metal
- Length: 53:03
- Label: AFM
- Producer: Edguy

Edguy chronology
| Theater of Salvation (1999) | The Savage Poetry (2000) | Mandrake (2001) |

Professional ratings
Review scores
| Source | Rating |
|---|---|
| Metal Storm | 7/10 stars |
| Metal Hammer (GER) | 6/7 stars |

The Savage Poetry, released in 2000, is a re-recording of the album Savage Poetry, originally launched in 1995 as a demo by German power metal band Edguy. This version is also seen and referred to as their fourth official studio album. The album was originally self-produced and released initially as a demo before the band were signed by AFM. The re-recorded tracks are also slightly re-arranged. Some versions of the album also features the original recording as a bonus disc.

== Track listing ==
All lyrics by Tobias Sammet. All music by Sammet except where noted.

1. "Hallowed" - 6:14
2. "Misguiding Your Life" - 4:04
3. "Key to My Fate" - 4:34
4. "Sands of Time" - 4:39
5. "Sacred Hell" - 5:37
6. "Eyes of the Tyrant" - 10:00
7. "Frozen Candle" (Sammet, Jens Ludwig) - 7:15
8. "Roses to No One" - 5:42
9. "Power and Majesty" (Sammet, Ludwig) - 4:53

=== Bonus disc (1995 demo) ===
1. "Key to My Fate" - 4:36
2. "Hallowed" - 6:30
3. "Misguiding Your Life" - 4:11
4. "Sands of Time" - 5:07
5. "Sacred Hell" - 6:09
6. "Eyes of the Tyrant" - 8:32
7. "Frozen Candle" - 7:57
8. "Roses to No One" - 5:48
9. "Power and Majesty" - 5:10

== Personnel ==
Band members

- Tobias Sammet - lead and backing vocals, keyboards
- Jens Ludwig - guitar, engineer
- Dirk Sauer - guitar
- Tobias 'Eggi' Exxel - bass
- Felix Bohnke - drums
- Dominik Storch – drums on 1995 version

Additional musicians

- Ralf Zdiarstek, Markus Schmitt - backing vocals
- Frank Tischer - piano on "Sands of Time"

Production

- Norman Meiritz - engineer
- Mikko Karmila - mixing
- Mika Jussila - mastering
