= Edguy =

German power metal band

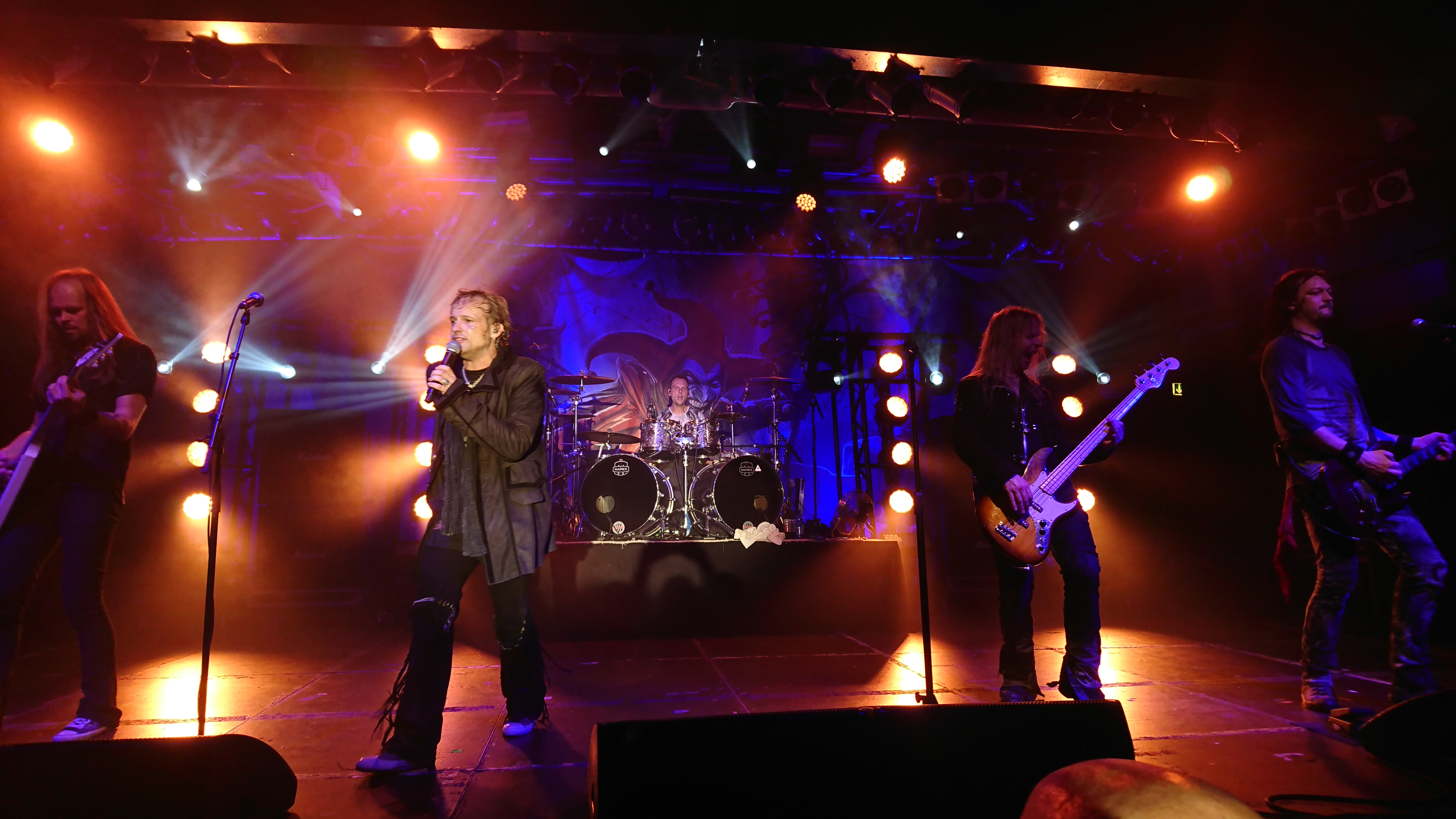
- Edguy performing in 2017

Background information
- Origin: Fulda, Germany
- Genres: Power metal, heavy metal
- Years active: 1992–2020, 2026–2027
- Labels: AFM; The End; Nuclear Blast
- Spinoffs: Avantasia
- Members: Tobias Sammet; Jens Ludwig; Dirk Sauer; Tobias Exxel; Felix Bohnke
- Past members: Dominik Storch
- Website: edguy.net

Edguy is a German power metal band formed in Fulda in 1992.

== History ==
=== Demos, AFM years (1992–2003) ===
Edguy was founded in 1992 by 14-year-old students Tobias Sammet, Jens Ludwig, Dominik Storch and Dirk Sauer. The name "Edguy" was an affectionate epithet for their math teacher at the time. In 1994, the band released two demos, Evil Minded and Children of Steel. These tapes were sent to many record labels, all of whom rejected the band, believing they would be unsuccessful in the music business.

Undeterred, they self-released their "unofficial" debut album, Savage Poetry, in 1995. They signed with AFM Records shortly after, who offered to re-release Savage Poetry with more widespread distribution. The band rejected this proposal in favour of recording a new album, Kingdom of Madness, which was released in 1997, but drummer Dominik Storch left the band shortly after. 1998 saw the release of their second album, Vain Glory Opera, with friend Frank Lindenthal filling in on drums. This album helped expose Edguy to a wider audience, thanks in part to guest appearances from Timo Tolkki (Stratovarius) and Hansi Kürsch (Blind Guardian). The band was joined by new drummer Felix Bohnke and bassist Tobias 'Eggi' Exxel later that year, allowing Tobias Sammet to solely focus on vocals (he had previously played bass as well handling vocal duties).

In 1999, Theater of Salvation was released. That same year frontman Tobias Sammet conceived the idea for the Avantasia project, a metal opera featuring well known vocalists and musicians from the rock and metal scene. While Tobias focused on Avantasia, the band took the opportunity to re-record Savage Poetry, to make it widely available to newer fans, as the original had become a much sought after rarity.

Following The Savage Poetry re-recording was the band's fifth album, Mandrake, in 2001. The album was accompanied by their first promo video, for the track "All the Clowns", as well as the Painting on the Wall single. The Mandrake album also led to the band's first headlining tour. Three shows were recorded in Europe and were the basis for Edguy's first live album, Burning Down the Opera – Live.

The band's contract with AFM had expired by this point, which led to them signing with Nuclear Blast in late 2003.

=== Nuclear Blast years (2004–present) ===
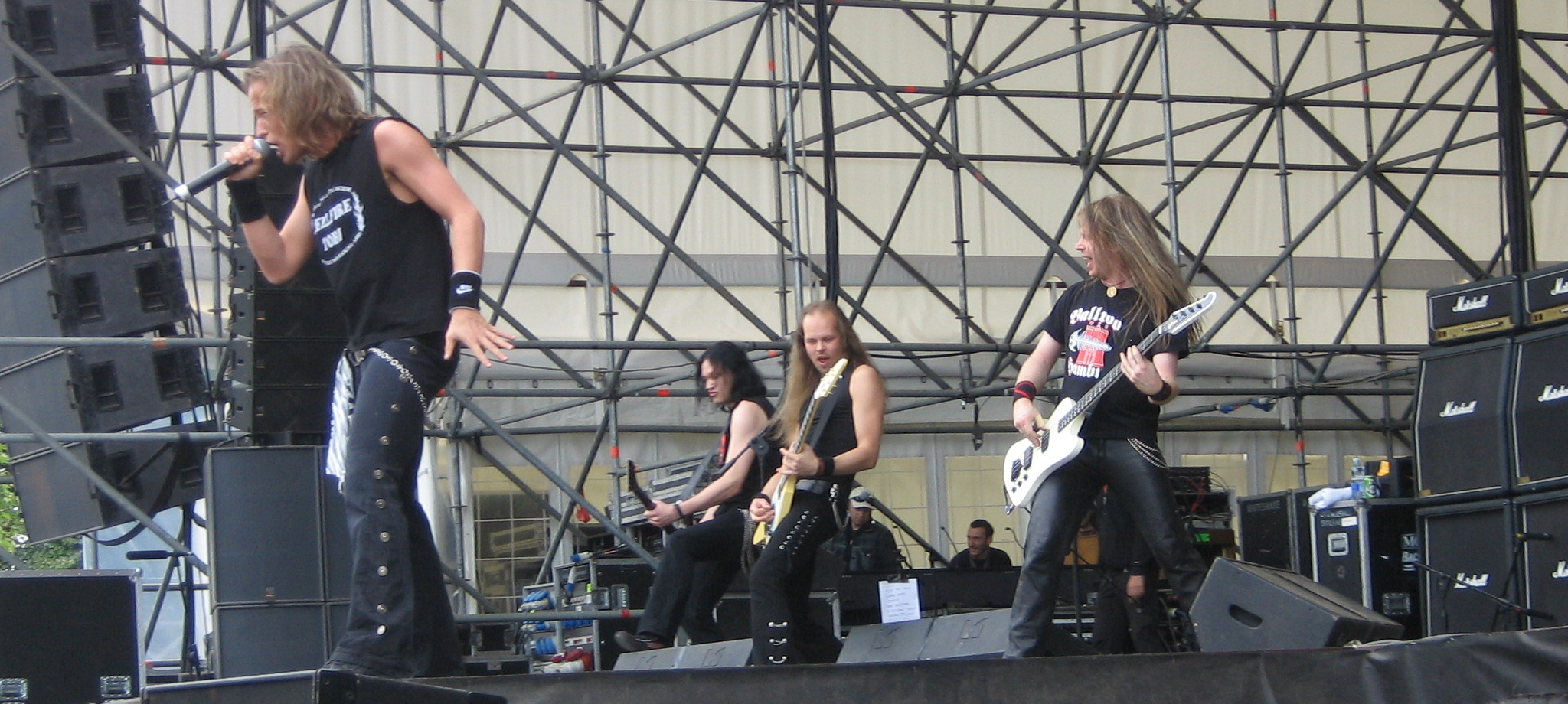
Edguy at Gods of Metal 2006

Edguy's first release for Nuclear Blast was the King of Fools EP in 2004. This preceded the Hellfire Club album, released shortly after. The song "Lavatory Love Machine" was also released as a single. The band's productivity continued into 2005 with the Superheroes EP and DVD, the latter featuring footage of the band live and in the studio, as well as a making of documentary for the video of the title track. This was followed by the full-length album Rocket Ride in January 2006.

Sammet spent much of 2007 relaunching the Avantasia project. Edguy returned to the studio in 2008 and recorded Tinnitus Sanctus, with a video being shot for the track "Ministry of Saints" in Belgrade, Serbia. After a contract renewal with Nuclear Blast in late 2008, the band released their first live DVD, Fucking with Fire – Live, in 2009. This featured live footage of the band shot in São Paulo, Brazil, on their Rocket Ride world tour in 2006. The band supported Scorpions on the German dates of their farewell tour in 2010.

Edguy released their ninth studio album, Age of the Joker, in August 2011. The band toured Europe and South America in support of the record, including dates with Slash and Deep Purple, as well as an appearance on the 70000 Tons of Metal cruise.

On 13 February 2013, Sammet did an interview promoting the latest release from his Avantasia project. In the same interview, he revealed that Edguy was to have a new album released, planned for mid-2014. On 28 January 2014, Edguy revealed that the album would be titled Space Police: Defenders of the Crown and released on 18 April.

On 13 March 2017, 2-CD/DVD-package Monuments, consisting of both old and new material, was announced for release on 14 July.

In 2018, Edguy released a remastered version of their first album Kingdom of Madness as an Anniversary Edition.

In March 2020, Sammet announced via Facebook page that Edguy was on hiatus because he has "been working on a new Avantasia record for a while now, and not on a new Edguy record because that's what feels right to me". Sammet also explained that while he considered Space Police to be a great album, the production of it had been "exhausting".

In June 2026, Sammet announced the band's first live performance in a decade, to take place on 25 June 2027 at the Domplatz in Fulda, calling it the band's "final chapter".

== Musical style ==
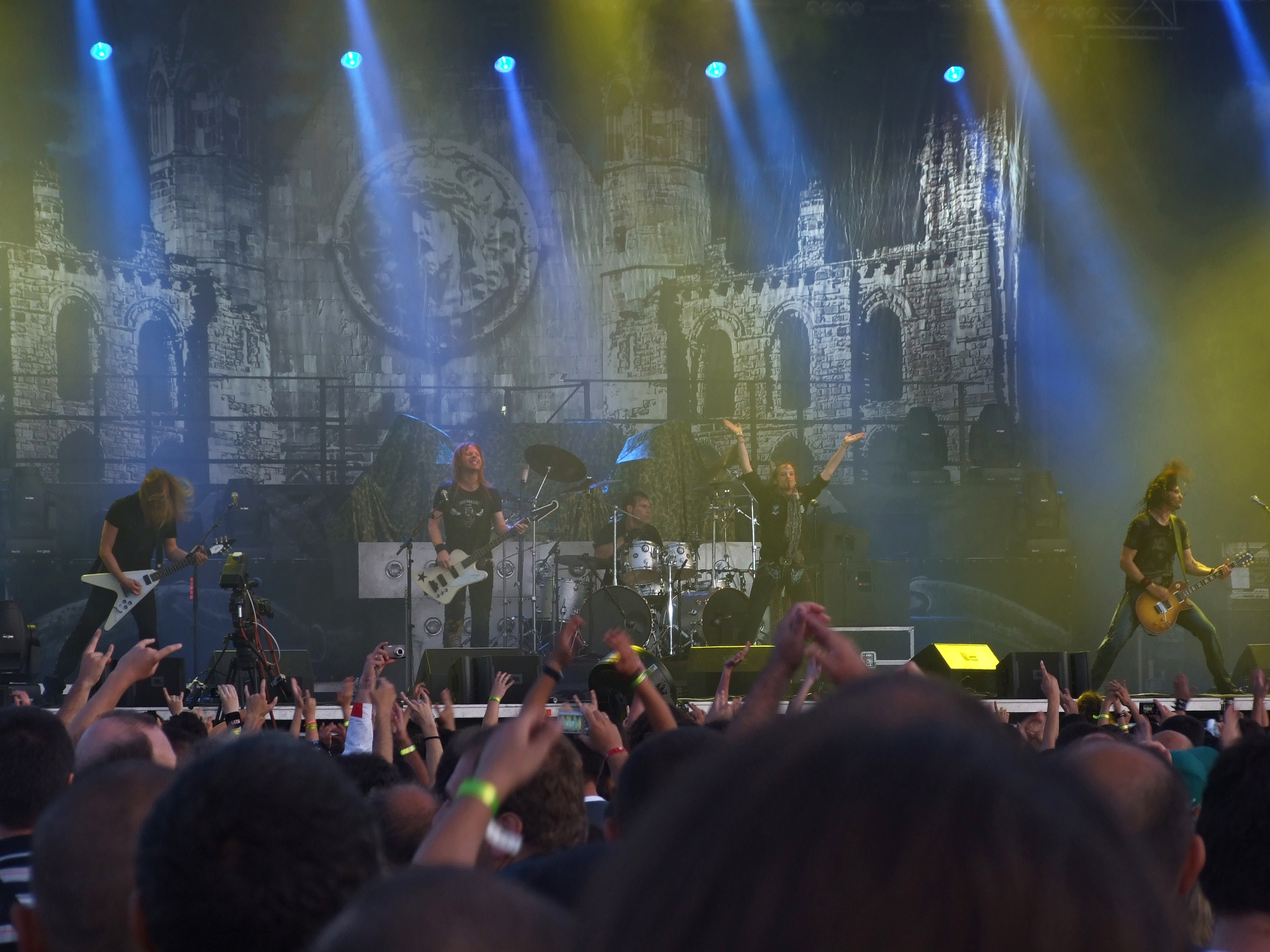
Edguy at Kavarna Rock Fest 2009

Edguy's lyrics are often metaphorical, alluding to metaphysical or social themes: conformity ("The Headless Game", "Mysteria", "King of Fools"), dictation by the church ("The Kingdom", "The Pride of Creation", "Theater of Salvation"), and dangers of modern civilization ("Navigator", "The Devil and the Savant"). To express such themes, Edguy sometimes use esoteric and hermetic expressions. Yet some of their songs are light-hearted or comedic ("Das Reh", "Save Us Now", "Lavatory Love Machine", "Life and Times of a Bonus Track", "Trinidad"). Edguy does not claim to represent any ideology; Tobias Sammet claimed "[the band is] not political and we are not religious; at least there is no key message in our songs telling you what to think in terms of anything".

Hellfire Club revealed Edguy's interest in experimenting within music by integrating an orchestra into the production. The album featured a variation on Edguy's style, with a less grandiose, more progressive metal approach being embraced. The band's album Rocket Ride features even less power metal elements, and is arguably more oriented towards hard rock. Their next album, Tinnitus Sanctus, contains even more hard rock oriented songs; a large reduction of double bass drumming is evident, in contrast to Edguy's older albums such as Vain Glory Opera where there is very fast double bass which is common in the power metal genre. When asked if the term "happy heavy metal band" applies to the band, Tobias rejected it and added:

We are a Heavy Metal band. We play angry, powerful, sometimes tongue-in-cheek Metal. We are flamboyant and we don't take ourselves too seriously, but that goes for Van Halen too, right? Are they Happy Rock? No, they have a sense of humor and kick ass! Just like we do...

== Band members ==
Current

- Tobias Sammet – vocals, keyboard (1992–present), bass guitar (1992–1998)
- Jens Ludwig – lead and rhythm guitar, backing vocals (1992–present)
- Dirk Sauer – rhythm and lead guitar, backing vocals (1992–present)
- Tobias Exxel – bass guitar, backing vocals (1998–present)
- Felix Bohnke – drums (1998–present)

Former

- Dominik Storch – drums (1992–1998)
- Frank Lindenthal – drums (1998) (studio only)

== Discography ==
=== Studio albums ===
Year	Title	Record label	Peak chart positions						
Year	Title	Record label	GER	AUT	FIN	FRA	SPA	SWE	SWI
1997	Kingdom of Madness	AFM	-	-	-	-	-	-	-
1998	Vain Glory Opera	AFM	-	-	-	-	-	-	-
1999	Theater of Salvation	AFM	66	-	-	-	-	50	-
2000	The Savage Poetry	AFM	79	-	-	-	-	60	-
2001	Mandrake	AFM	19	-	-	47	-	32	-
2004	Hellfire Club	Nuclear Blast	26	68	22	54	-	6	81
2006	Rocket Ride	Nuclear Blast	8	50	25	-	-	8	50
2008	Tinnitus Sanctus	Nuclear Blast	19	50	-	85	-	28	41
2011	Age of the Joker	Nuclear Blast	3	30	15	98	44	10	13
2014	Space Police: Defenders of the Crown	Nuclear Blast	2	27	12	72	59	28	13

=== Live albums ===
- Burning Down the Opera (2003)
- Fucking with Fire – Live (2009)

=== Singles ===
- "La Marche Des Gendarmes" (2001)
- "Painting on the Wall" (2001)
- "Lavatory Love Machine" (2004)

=== Demos ===
- Evil Minded (1993)
- Children of Steel (1994)
- Savage Poetry (1995)

=== EPs ===
Year	Title	Peak chart positions						
Year	Title	GER	AUT	FIN	FRA	ITA	SWE	SWI
2004	King of Fools	39	67	12	-	-	16	98
2005	Superheroes	25	-	-	96	48	10	52

=== Compilation albums ===
- Hall of Flames (2004)
- The Singles (2008)
- Monuments (2017)

=== Videos ===
- "All the Clowns" (2001)
- "King of Fools" (2004)
- "Lavatory Love Machine" (2004)
- "Superheroes" (2005)
- "Ministry of Saints" (2008)
- "Robin Hood" (2011)
- "Love Tyger" (2014)

=== DVDs ===
- Superheroes (2005)
- Fucking With Fire – Live (2009)
- Monuments (2017)
