= Tobias Exxel =

Eggi Exxel
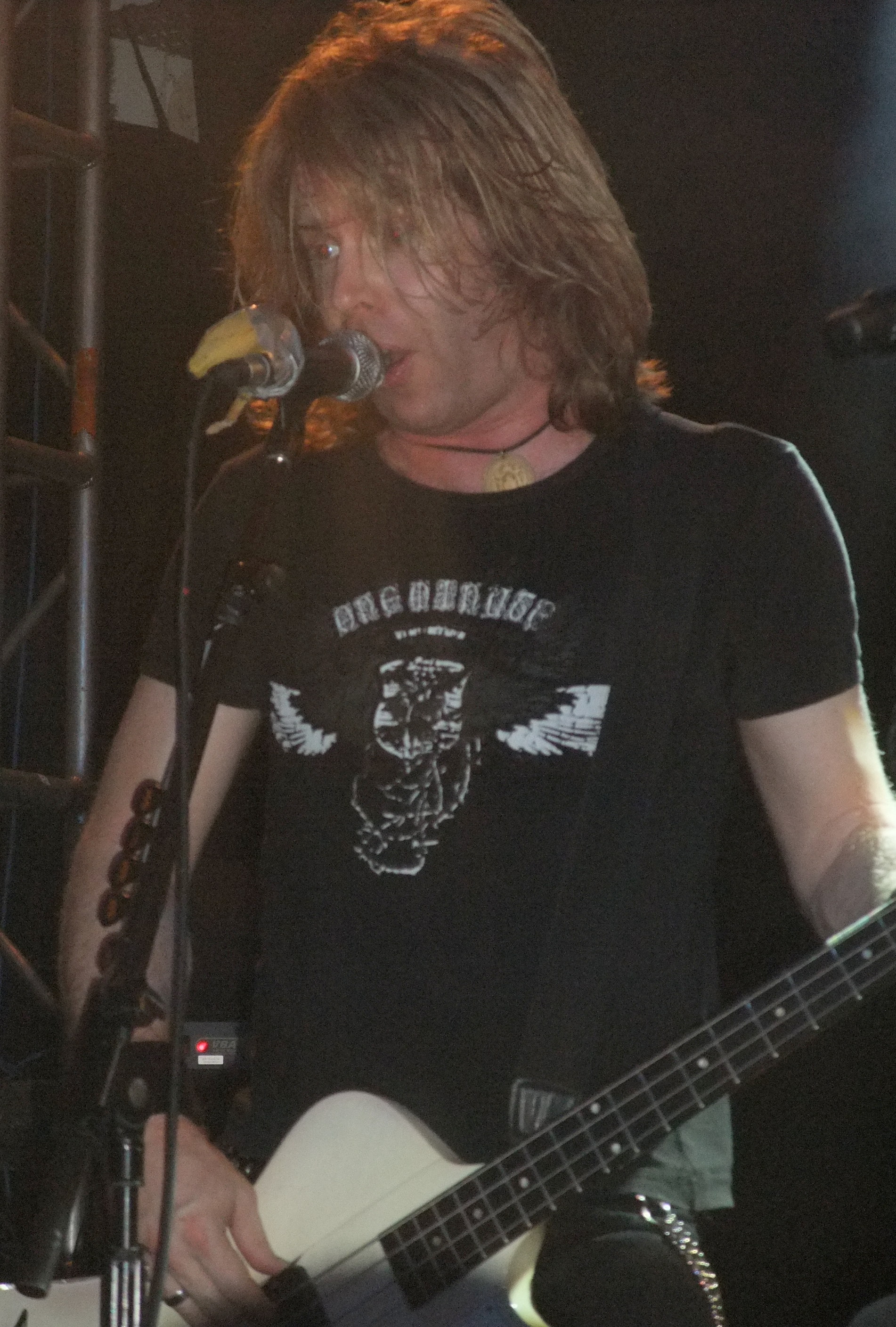
- Tobias Exxel performing live in 2010

Background information
- Born: Tobias Exxel; 27 February 1973 (age 53); Germany
- Occupation: Musician
- Instruments: Bass, Guitar
- Years active: 1988–present

Tobias "Eggi" Exxel (born 27 February 1973) is the current bass player for the power metal band Edguy and for the melodic metal band The Unity. Tobias was hired by Edguy in 1998 when vocalist Tobias Sammet, who had played bass since the band's formation in 1992, decided the band should have someone who could focus on playing the instrument full-time.

Tobias had previously played guitar and bass in the band Squealer and would also go on to perform both roles in his side-project, Taraxacum, which was active between 2000 and 2005. After Taraxacum was put to rest, Tobias formed Everleaf. Prior to these bands, he played in Galen from 1988 to 1993.

During Wacken Open Air on 7 August 2010, Tobias left the stage briefly to take a call relating to his new family. On 13 August 2010, Tobias' girlfriend gave birth to their first child, son Julian. Markus Grosskopf of Helloween replaced Tobias until his return. He has also played live with bands Gamma Ray and Unisonic as bass player and guitarist, respectively.

== Discography ==
=== Edguy ===
- Theater of Salvation (1999)
- The Savage Poetry (2000)
- Mandrake (2001)
- Burning Down the Opera (2003)
- King of Fools (EP) (2004)
- Hellfire Club (2004)
- Superheroes (EP) (2005)
- Rocket Ride (2006)
- Tinnitus Sanctus (2008)
- Fucking with Fire – Live (2009)
- Age of the Joker (2011)
- Space Police: Defenders of the Crown (2014)

=== Squealer ===
- Wrong Time, Wrong Place? (1995)
- The Prophecy (1999)

=== Taraxacum ===
- Spirit of Freedom (2001)
- Rainmaker (2003)

=== Bassinvaders ===
- Hellbassbeaters (2008)

=== Krypteria ===
- All Beauty Must Die (2011)
