= Tobias Sammet =

German musician

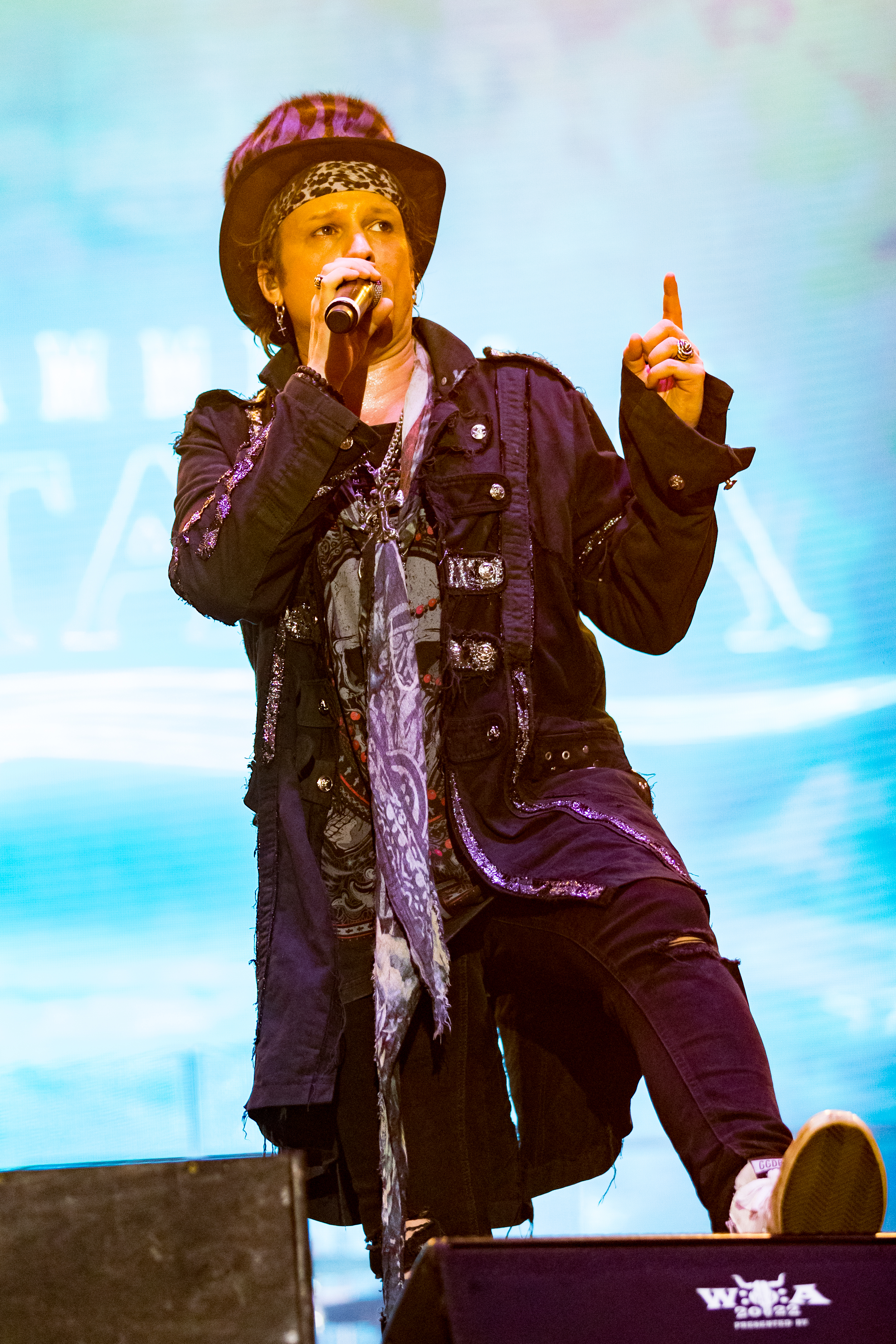
- Sammet at Wacken Open Air 2022

Background information
- Born: 21 November 1977 (age 48); Fulda, West Germany
- Genres: Heavy metal; symphonic metal
- Occupations: Musician, songwriter, producer
- Instruments: Vocals, keyboard, bass guitar
- Years active: 1992–present
- Member of: Edguy; Avantasia
- Website: tobiassammet.com

Tobias Sammet (born 21 November 1977) is a German musician, songwriter, and music producer. He is the singer and primary songwriter of the power metal band Edguy, and the founder of the metal opera project Avantasia.

== Career ==
Sammet founded Edguy in 1992 with schoolmates. Under the musical influence of AC/DC, Freddie Mercury (Queen), and Helloween, the typical power metal sound of his band, in which he mainly acts as a singer and frontman, emerged.

After several tours and chart placements with Edguy, Sammet founded his all-star project Avantasia and released a metal opera under this name. Initially planned as a once-in-a-lifetime studio project, he launched Avantasia again in 2006 and since then he regularly produced concept albums and rock operas. When he was offered the evening program of the main stage with Avantasia at the Wacken Open Air in 2008, he decided to put his side project on stage. Since then, he has regularly toured North and South America, Asia and Europe with Edguy and Avantasia.

He made guest appearances on Rob Rock's album Holy Hell, on the metal opera Aina, and on Revolution Renaissance's New Era album, besides others.

In 2011, readers of the Japanese Burrn Magazine ranked him best songwriter after he had released the two albums The Wicked Symphony and Angel of Babylon simultaneously. The albums featured guest appearances by Klaus Meine, Eric Singer, Jon Oliva and Michael Kiske and contained 21 songs that had been solely written by Tobias.

During a headliner show of the band Edguy at the Bang Your Head Festival in 2012, Sammet fell off the stage and broke his nose and several ribs. Despite these injuries, he sang the entire set of the concert before being treated in hospital.

Tobias Sammet has sold more than three million records, played 12 world tours in more than 40 countries, had numerous chart placements and played concerts at all major festivals (including 10 shows at Wacken Open Air).

== Discography ==
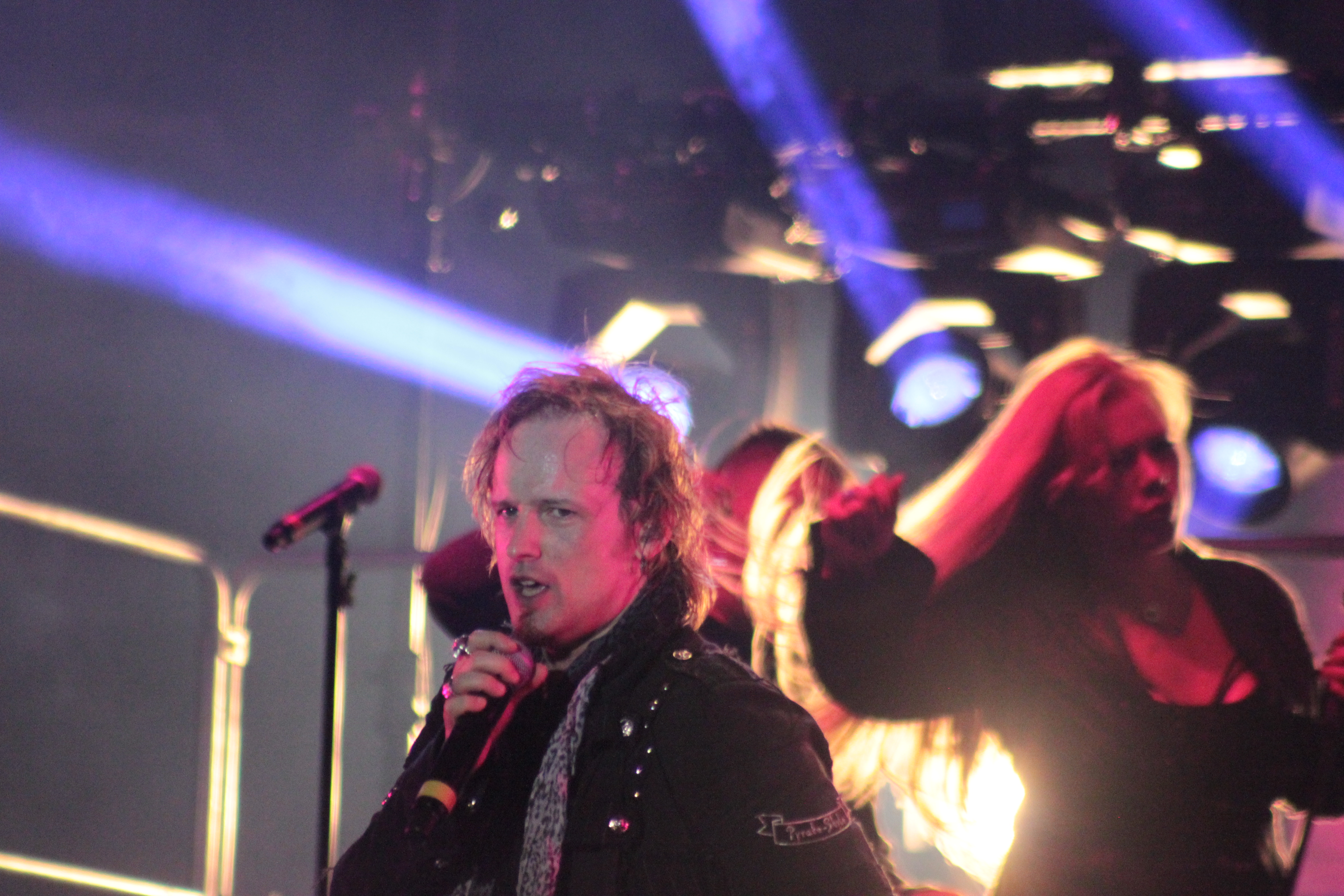
Tobias Sammet

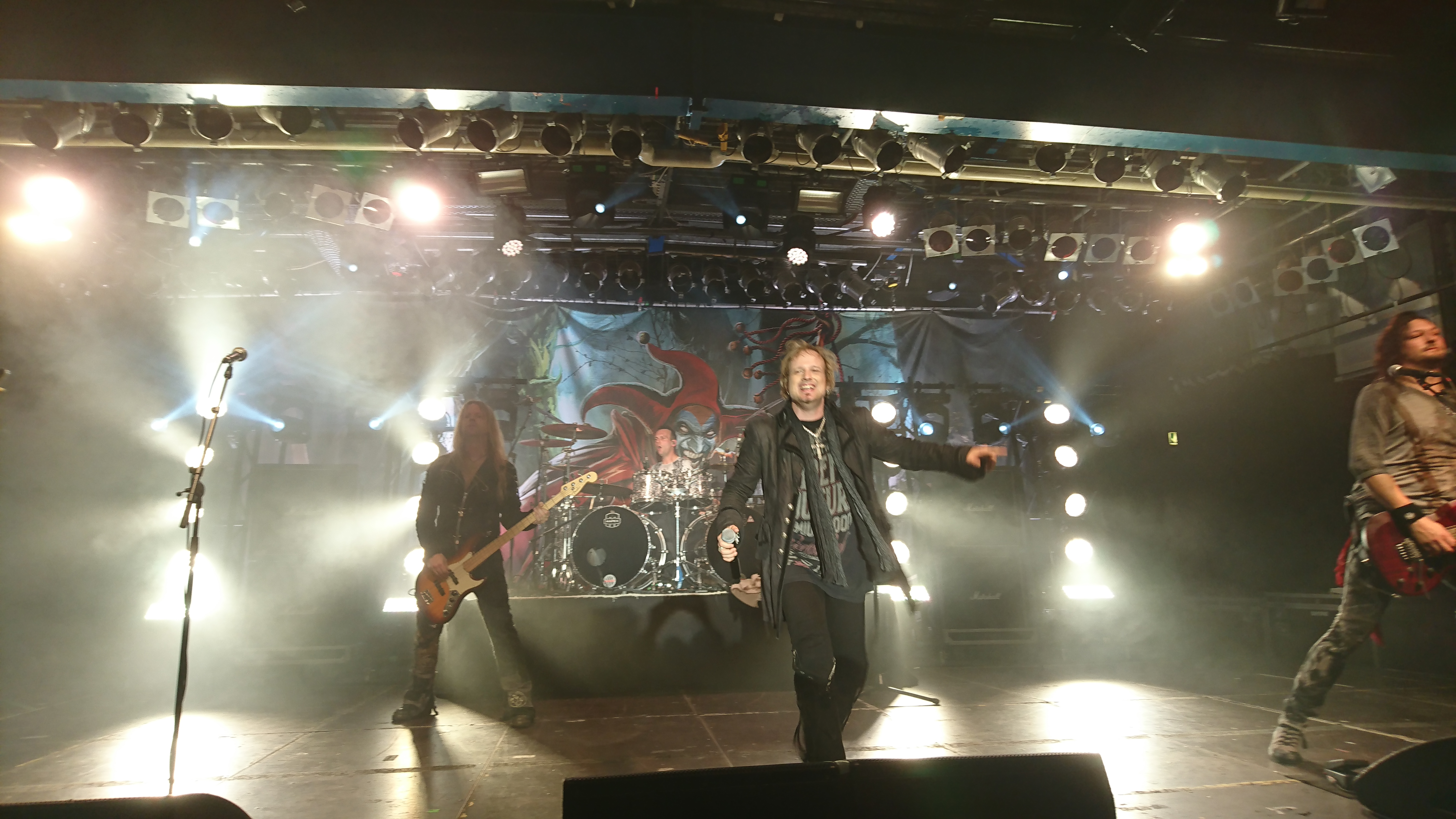
Tobias Sammet and Edguy 25 Years-Tour 2017

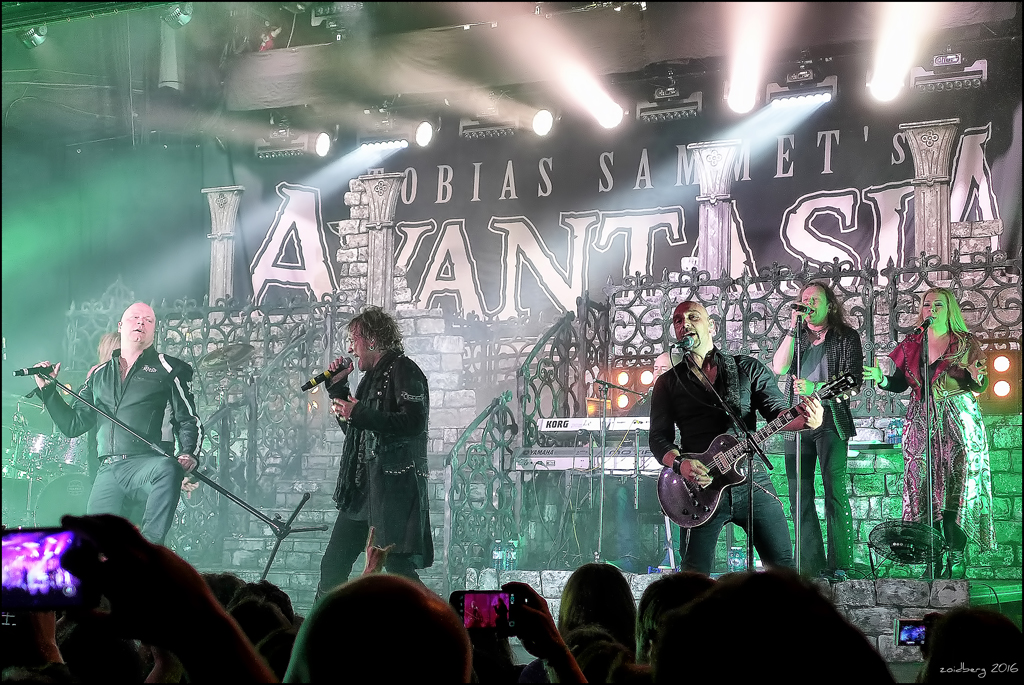
Tobias Sammet with Avantasia 2016

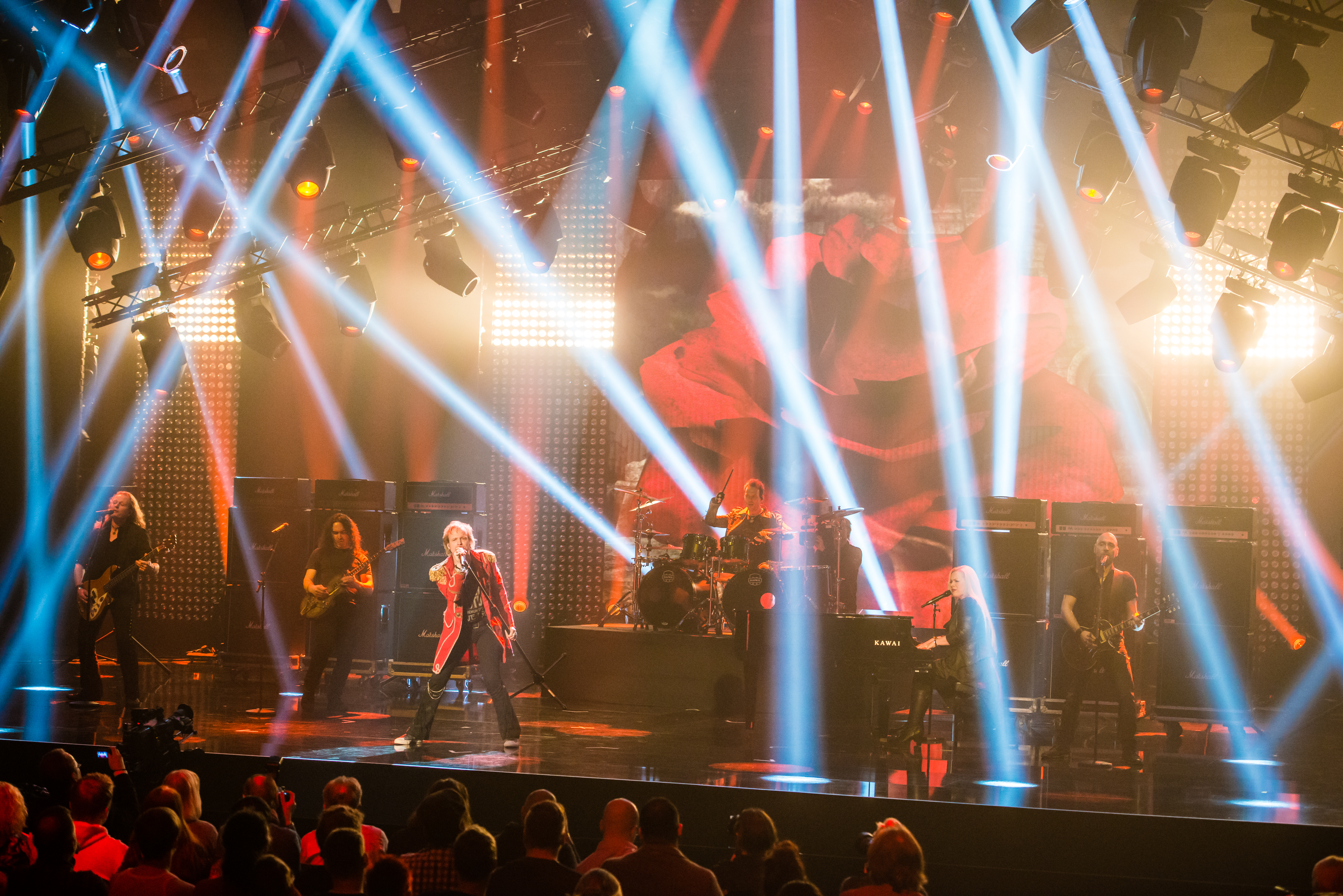
Tobias Sammet and Avantasia ESC 2016

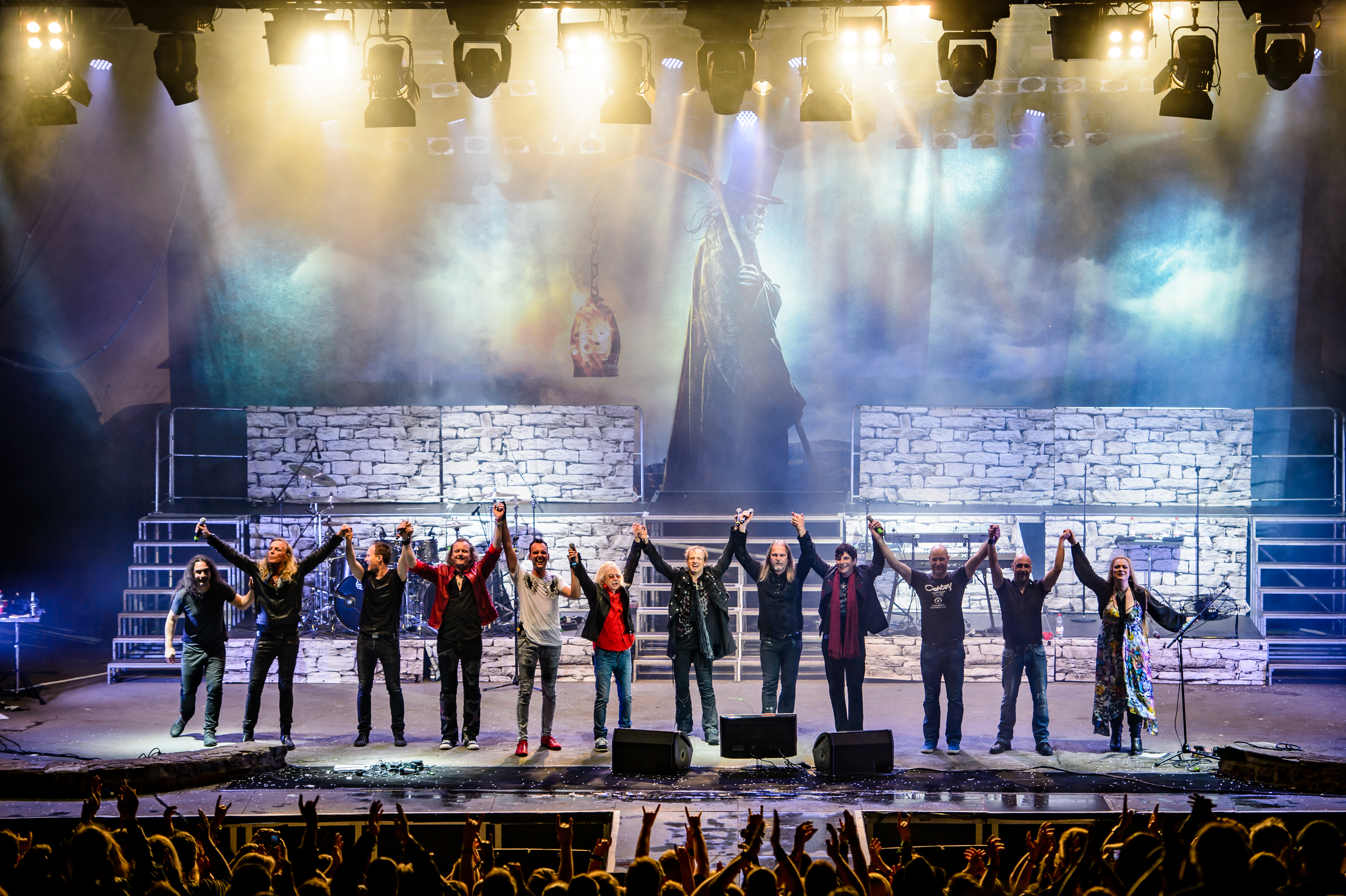
Tobias Sammet with Avantasia 2017

=== Edguy ===
Studio albums:

- Kingdom of Madness (1997)
- Vain Glory Opera (1998)
- Theater of Salvation (1999)
- The Savage Poetry (2000)
- Mandrake (2001)
- Hellfire Club (2004)
- Rocket Ride (2006)
- Tinnitus Sanctus (2008)
- Age of the Joker (2011)
- Space Police: Defenders of the Crown (2014)

Live albums:

- Burning Down The Opera (2003)
- Fucking with Fire: Live (2009)
