= Jens Ludwig =

German musician (born 1977)

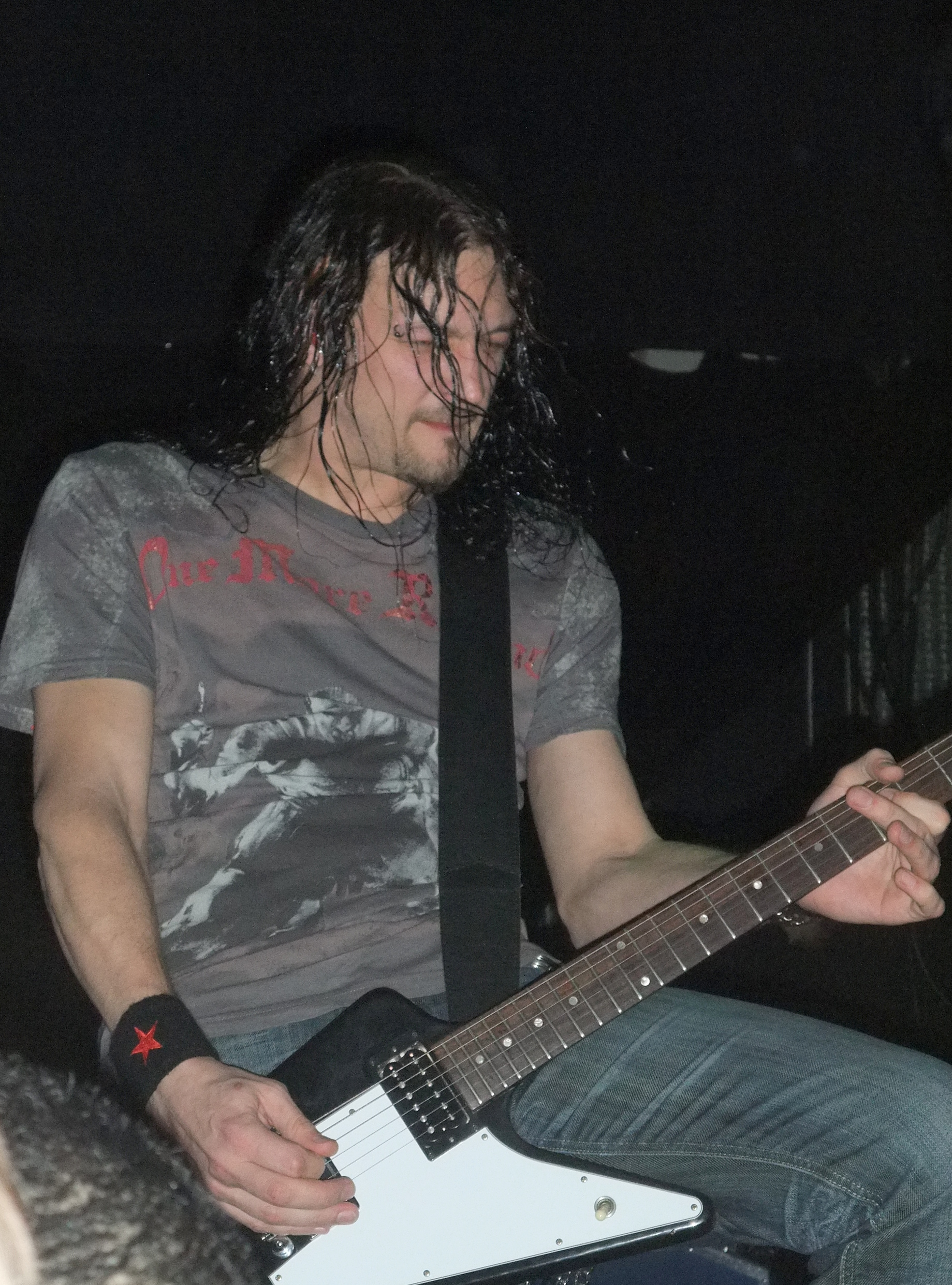
- Jens Ludwig performing live in 2010

Background information
- Born: Jens Ludwig; 30 August 1977 (age 48); Germany
- Occupation: Musician
- Instrument: Guitar
- Years active: 1992–present

Jens Ludwig (born 30 August 1977) is the lead guitarist and co-founder of the German power metal band Edguy. Jens has played nearly all the band's lead parts and guitar solos since their inception and is the only member of the current line-up other than Tobias Sammet to have any songwriting credits. He also contributed lead guitar work for Sammet's Avantasia side project, on both The Metal Opera and The Metal Opera Part II. In 2021, Ludwig and vocalist Nando Fernandes formed a new band, The Grandmaster. He has an endorsement with Gibson guitars, Marshall amplifiers, Ernie Ball - Strings Music Man (company), Vox (musical equipment) Amps, Shure mics & wireless equipment, Kemper Profiling Amps and others.

== Discography ==
=== Avantasia ===
- The Metal Opera (2001)
- The Metal Opera Part II (2002)

=== Morrigan ===
- Forgoden Art (1999)

=== The Grandmaster ===
- Skywards (2021)
