= The Resist Tour =

2018–19 concert tour by Within Temptation

- Tour by Within Temptation
- Promotional artwork of the first European leg of the tour.
- Location: Europe; North America
- Associated album: Resist
- Start date: 11 October 2018
- End date: 14 September 2019
- Legs: 3
- No. of shows: 76

Within Temptation concert chronology
- Hydra World Tour (2014–2016); The Resist Tour (2018–2019); Worlds Collide (2022)

The Resist Tour (also referred to as Resist Tour) was a concert tour by the Dutch symphonic metal band Within Temptation, in support of their seventh album Resist which was released on 1 February 2019. The tour began on 11 October 2018 in Krasnoyarsk, Russia, and visited seventeen countries in Europe. The supporting acts for the first leg were bands Beyond the Black and Ego Kill Talent. For 2019, the band toured North America alongside In Flames and performed at both select European summer festivals and special open air shows with selected guests. The band was scheduled to perform a second round of summer festivals in 2020, but due to the COVID-19 pandemic the festivals had to be cancelled.

== Background ==
At the end of 2017, without any news of a sooner studio release, the band announced that they would be embarking on a new tour on the second half of the following year, with a possible new studio album in sight. Even before the arrival of the new year, a few concerts were already sold out. The tour had been labelled "MMXVIII" at that time, as a reference to the year of 2018 and, only after the announcement of their seventh album Resist, the name was changed to "The Resist Tour" in support of the album. Initially, only club and arena dates throughout Europe were added to the tour, before the band started scheduling dates for some 2019 summer festivals. As lead vocalist Sharon den Adel had been facing personal problems and a writer's block before officially start writing for the album, the band's fate was uncertain at the point and she was unsure to even get back touring after all. When later revealed that the vocalist has also decided to stay more time at home to be more present on her children's life, the touring schedule was elaborated with normally two weeks on tour and two weeks off. At the end of 2018, it was announced a new leg of the tour in North America at the beginning of the following year, with In Flames as special guests and Smash into Pieces as the opening act. The leg will consist of 15 dates, with 12 of them passing through the United States and 3 in Canada. After the North American leg, the band commenced another round of concerts throughout Europe, this time consisting of festival presentations and special concerts at palace gardens. During the 2019 festival season, the band was scheduled for the first time as one of the headliners for the Graspop Metal Meeting, one of the biggest European heavy metal festivals.

Although the album would only be released after the start of the tour, den Adel stated in an interview that some then-unreleased songs were going to be played by the band, allowing people to have a first contact with the record on a live form. The first ones to be played were the single "The Reckoning", "Raise Your Banner", "Endless War", "Supernova", and "Mercy Mirror". After the album was released, the band maintained the five aforementioned songs on the setlist. At a certain point of the North American leg, they started playing the track "In Vain". "Firelight", whilst having not yet been played during the tour, was played by den Adel and guitarist Stefan Helleblad alongside Jasper Steverlinck at a special event in Belgium.

A special stage design and specific costumes were elaborated by the band for the tour. The stage was ornamented with a futuristic metallic design with special stage lighting effects, projection screens, and fog machines, to intensify the exact atmosphere of the songs, especially the ones from the recurrent album. The band male members made use of special futuristic uniforms, and den Adel of a futuristic black dress, a white cloak, and a special flag for the song "Raise Your Banner". For the closing song "Stairway to the Skies", the vocalist has a change of clothing to a sparkly blue dress before being elevated on the stage by a harness in front of special white lightning and sky projections, as an allegory for the lyrics of the song. The level of special stage effects, however, changed according to the capacity of each venue of comporting them.

By the end of 2018, it was reported by the Dutch media that the first European leg of the tour had an attendance of 125,000 people.

During the COVID-19 pandemic, the band took part at the Together at Home movement, where artists made online live performances to encourage people to stay home and prevent more infection cases.

== Reception ==
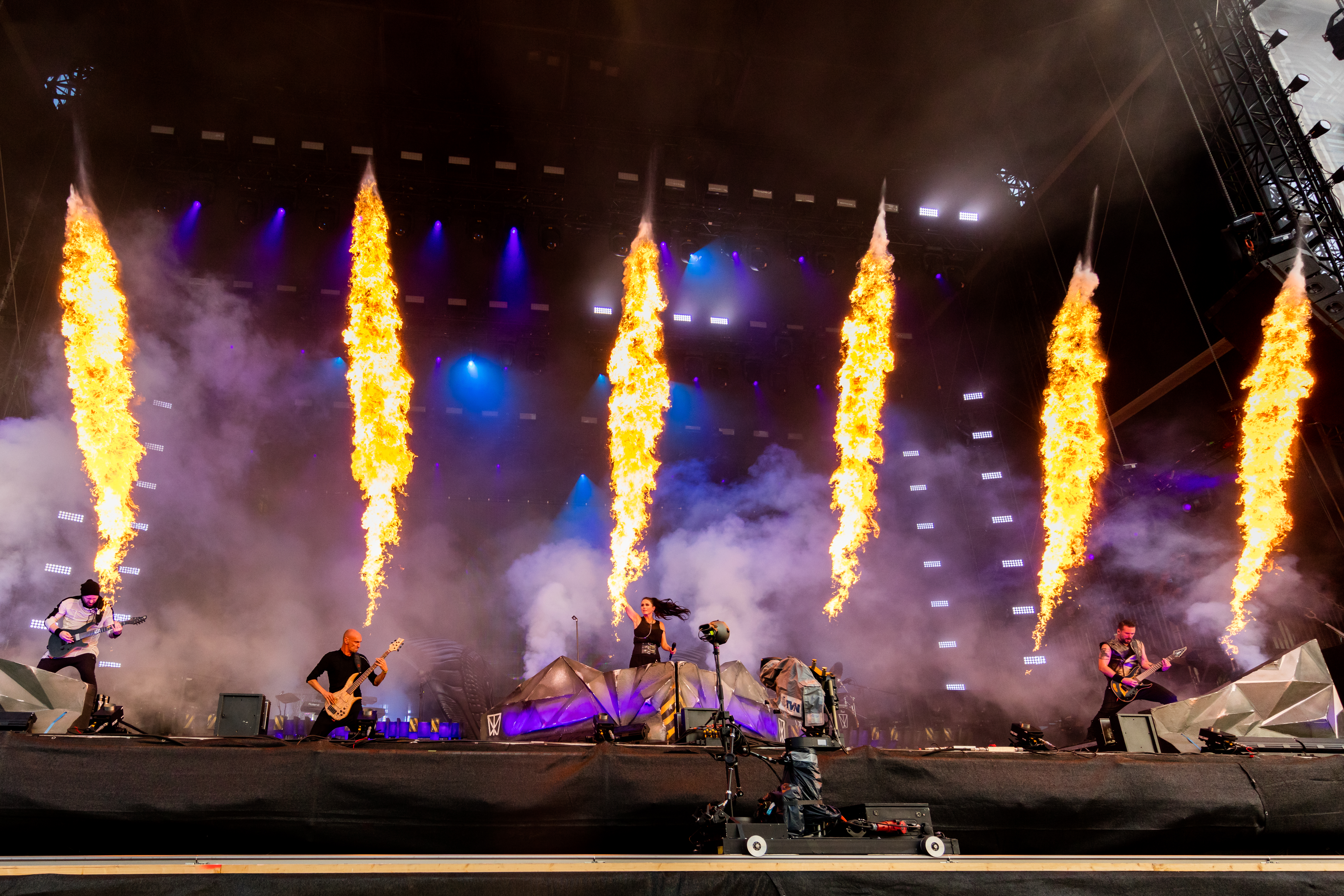
The band performing on a Resist-themed stage at the 2019 Wacken Open Air.

Keld Broksø from Danish magazine Gaffa was positive about the tour. In his 4 star review of the concert at the Valby-Hallen, in Copenhagen, Broksø pointed a great improvement from the band's latest concert on the country back in 2014. The reviewer pointed lead vocalist Sharon den Adel's vocal abilities as the main attraction of the concert, and considered the performances of "Faster", "The Reckoning" and "Shot in the Dark" as the highest points of the show. While stating that the more intimate songs may not work on a heavy metal festival audience, he stated that in a proper venue it can become "beautiful and atmospheric".

Dom Walsh, from English website Louder Than War was also positive in his review about the Manchester concert, praising the band's performance as a whole while also remarking den Adel's vocals and connection with the crowd. While the reviewer noted a lesser interaction from the crowd with the still unreleased songs, as people didn't know them, he pointed out The Heart of Everything songs as the highest points of the concert, as well the closing song "Stairway to the Skies". Walsh concluded his review stating that "the slick and well-choreographed show, along with the stunning visual and light display made for an excellent piece of rock theatre. Whilst there is plenty of variation in Within Temptation’s back catalogue in terms of styles; ultimately, the soaring guitars, swirling choral choirs and Adel’s inimitable style pulse through the veins of every composition."

Mark Shepley, from the also British Flick of the Finger, cited the same qualities in his 5 out of 5 starts review of the London concert, positing the "Forgiven" performance as its highest point and classifying the concert as "rock music at its most brilliant".

Berklee Groove gave a positive review about the concert at the PlayStation Theater in New York City, also praising den Adel's vocals and the blend of styles the band managed to present during the concert, stating that "the end result is a unique blend of rock, pop, industrial, and even opera at times, all of which are what make Within Temptation stand out from a host of other anthemic rock acts."

== Tour dates ==
List of 2018 concerts
Date	City	Country	Venue	Opening act(s)
11 October 2018	Krasnoyarsk	Russia	Grand Hall Sibir	—N/a
13 October 2018	Novosibirsk	Russia	DK Zheleznodorozhnikov	—N/a
15 October 2018	Yekaterinburg	Russia	Concert Hall Kosmos	—N/a
17 October 2018	Nizhniy Novgorod	Russia	Milo Concert Hall	—N/a
18 October 2018	Moscow	Russia	Adrenaline Stadium Club	—N/a
19 October 2018	Saint Petersburg	Russia	A2 Green Concert	—N/a
20 October 2018	Espoo	Finland	Espoo Metro Areena	Smash into Pieces
22 October 2018	Stockholm	Sweden	Annexet	Beyond the Black
23 October 2018	Oslo	Norway	Sentrum Scene	Beyond the Black
24 October 2018	Copenhagen	Denmark	Valby-Hallen	Beyond the Black
26 October 2018	Poznań	Poland	Sala Ziemi	Beyond the Black
27 October 2018	Warsaw	Poland	Torwar Hall	Beyond the Black
9 November 2018	Birmingham	England	O2 Academy Birmingham	Ego Kill Talent
10 November 2018	Manchester	England	O2 Apollo Manchester	Ego Kill Talent
11 November 2018	Glasgow	Scotland	O2 Academy Glasgow	Ego Kill Talent
13 November 2018	London	England	O2 Brixton Academy	Ego Kill Talent
14 November 2018	Southampton	England	Southampton Guildhall	Ego Kill Talent
16 November 2018	Paris	France	Zénith Paris	Ego Kill Talent
17 November 2018	Antwerp	Belgium	Lotto Arena	Ego Kill Talent
19 November 2018	Cologne	Germany	Palladium	Ego Kill Talent
20 November 2018	Esch-Sur-Alzette	Luxembourg	Rockhal	Ego Kill Talent
21 November 2018	Zürich	Switzerland	Samsung Hall	Ego Kill Talent
23 November 2018	Amsterdam	Netherlands	AFAS Live	Ego Kill Talent
24 November 2018	Amsterdam	Netherlands	AFAS Live	Ego Kill Talent
25 November 2018	Groningen	Netherlands	MartiniPlaza	Ego Kill Talent
8 December 2018	Berlin	Germany	Columbiahalle	Beyond the Black
9 December 2018	Hamburg	Germany	Mehr! Theater	Beyond the Black
11 December 2018	Prague	Czech Republic	Forum Karlin	Beyond the Black
12 December 2018	Budapest	Hungary	Tüskecsarnok	Beyond the Black
13 December 2018	Vienna	Austria	Gasometer	Beyond the Black
15 December 2018	Milan	Italy	Milan La Fabrique	Beyond the Black
16 December 2018	Ludwigsburg	Germany	MHP Arena	Beyond the Black
17 December 2018	Munich	Germany	Kulturhalle Zenith	Beyond the Black
18 December 2018	Frankfurt	Germany	Jahrhunderthalle	Beyond the Black
20 December 2018	Tilburg	Netherlands	013	Beyond the Black
21 December 2018	Tilburg	Netherlands	013	Beyond the Black
22 December 2018	Tilburg	Netherlands	013	Beyond the Black

List of 2019 concerts
Date	City	Country	Venue	Opening act(s)
18 January 2019	Oulu	Finland	Club Teatria	Dark Sarah
28 February 2019	Baltimore	United States	Rams Head Live!	In Flames; Smash into Pieces
1 March 2019	Philadelphia	United States	The Filmore	In Flames; Smash into Pieces
2 March 2019	New York City	United States	PlayStation Theater	In Flames; Smash into Pieces
3 March 2019	Boston	United States	House of Blues	In Flames; Smash into Pieces
5 March 2019	Montreal	Canada	Olympia	In Flames; Smash into Pieces
6 March 2019	Toronto	Canada	Rebel	In Flames; Smash into Pieces
8 March 2019	Chicago	United States	House of Blues	In Flames; Smash into Pieces
9 March 2019	Minneapolis	United States	Skyway Theater	In Flames; Smash into Pieces
11 March 2019	Denver	United States	The Summit	In Flames; Smash into Pieces
12 March 2019	Salt Lake City	United States	The Complex	In Flames; Smash into Pieces
14 March 2019	Portland	United States	Roseland Theater	In Flames; Smash into Pieces
15 March 2019	Vancouver	Canada	The Vogue	In Flames; Smash into Pieces
16 March 2019	Seattle	United States	Showbox SoDo	In Flames; Smash into Pieces
18 March 2019	San Francisco	United States	Warfield Theatre	In Flames; Smash into Pieces
19 March 2019	Los Angeles	United States	Wiltern Theatre	In Flames; Smash into Pieces
19 April 2019	Schijndel	Netherlands	Paaspop Festival	—N/a
8 June 2019	Hyvinkää	Finland	Rockfest	—N/a
15 June 2019	Interlaken	Switzerland	Greenfield Festival	—N/a
16 June 2019	Nickelsdorf	Austria	Nova Rock Festival	—N/a
21 June 2019	Dessel	Belgium	Graspop Metal Meeting	—N/a
22 June 2019	Clisson	France	Hellfest	—N/a
26 June 2019	Kraków	Poland	Mystic Festival	—N/a
28 June 2019	Trondheim	Norway	Trondheim Rocks	—N/a
29 June 2019	Parkstad	Netherlands	ParkCity Live	—N/a
6 July 2019	Viveiro	Spain	Resurrection Fest	—N/a
11 July 2019	Baarn	Netherlands	Soestdijk Palace	Anneke van Giersbergen
13 July 2019	Vizovice	Czech Republic	Masters of Rock	—N/a
20 July 2019	Faro	Portugal	38th Faro Biker's Rally	—N/a
27 July 2019	Kemerovo	Russia	Heroes of World Rock	—N/a
2 August 2019	Wacken	Germany	Wacken Open Air	—N/a
3 August 2019	Schwetzingen	Germany	Schwetzingen Palace	Scarlet Dorn
~~7 August 2019~~	~~Byblos~~	~~Lebanon~~	~~Byblos International Festival~~^{[A]}	—N/a
9 August 2019	Dresden	Germany	Junge Garde	Scarlet Dorn
10 August 2019	Hildesheim	Germany	M'era Luna Festival	—N/a
29 August 2019	Raalte	Netherlands	Stöppelhaene	—N/a
31 August 2019	Katwijk aan den Rijn	Netherlands	Oranjerock	—N/a
1 September 2019	Aarburg	Switzerland	Riverside Open Air	—N/a
14 September 2019	Tiel	Netherlands	Appelpop	—N/a

- A Canceled due to religious protests against the festival.

=== Box office ===
Venue	City	Attendance	Revenue
Junge Garde	Dresden	3,857 / 4,000	$154,360

== Personnel ==
=== Within Temptation ===
- Sharon den Adel – vocals
- Ruud Jolie – lead guitar
- Stefan Helleblad – rhythm guitar, occasional backing vocals
- Martijn Spierenburg – keyboards
- Jeroen van Veen – bass guitar
- Mike Coolen – drums

=== Guest musicians ===
- Anders Fridén – featured vocals on "Raise Your Banner" on 19 March 2019
- Anneke van Giersbergen – featured vocals on "Somewhere" on 11 July 2019
- Jonas Pap – cello on "Ice Queen", "The Last Dance" and "Somewhere" on 11 July 2019
- Camila Van Der Kooij – violins on "Ice Queen", The Last Dance" and "Somewhere" on 11 July 2019
- Tarja Turunen – featured vocals on "Paradise (What About Us?)" on 13 July 2019
- Koen Stokman – rhythm guitar on 14 September 2019
