= In Vain (Within Temptation song) =

Single from Dutch symphonic metal and rock band Within Temptation

Single by Within Temptation

from the album Resist
- Released: 11 January 2019
- Recorded: 2018
- Length: 4:25 (album version); 3:57 (single version)
- Label: Vertigo
- Songwriters: Sharon den Adel; Robert Westerholt; Daniel Gibson; William Knox
- Producers: Daniel Gibson; Within Temptation; Mathijs Tieken

Within Temptation singles chronology
"Firelight" (2018)	"In Vain" (2019)	"Supernova" (2019)

"In Vain" is the fourth single from Dutch symphonic metal band Within Temptation's seventh studio album Resist. It was released worldwide via digital download and streaming on 11 January 2019.

== Background ==
"In Vain" is a power ballad song written for the band's seventh studio album Resist. The track features a "down-to-earth" production and uses "softer rock stylings" and "emotionally driven lyrics" in order to achieve the new direction the band aimed for the record. The song was released as the fourth single from the album and accompanied a lyric video. Differently from the previous singles, which were all played live before the album official release, the track only started being played on tour afterwards. Despite not entering any official single sales chart, the song found airplay rotation in selected places and managed to enter airplay charts in Belgium, Czech Republic and Finland, where it stayed for ten weeks.

== Track listing ==
Digital download
No.	Title	Writer(s)	Length
1.	"In Vain" (Album version)	Sharon den Adel; Robert Westerholt; Daniel Gibson; William Knox	4:25
2.	"In Vain" (Single edit)	den Adel; Westerholt; Gibson; Knox	3:57

== Personnel ==
Within Temptation

- Sharon den Adel – vocals
- Ruud Jolie – lead guitar
- Stefan Helleblad – rhythm guitar
- Martijn Spierenburg – keyboards
- Jeroen van Veen – bass
- Mike Coolen – drums

== Charts ==
Chart (2019)	Peak position
Czech Republic (Modern Rock)	4
Finland Airplay (Radiosoittolista)	66
