= Resist (Within Temptation album) =

Studio album by Within Temptation
- Released: 1 February 2019
- Recorded: 2017–2018
- Studios: ICP Recording Studios (Brussels, Belgium); Wisseloord Studios (Hilversum, The Netherlands)
- Genres: Symphonic metal; pop metal; power metal
- Length: 47:43
- Labels: Vertigo; Spinefarm
- Producers: Daniel Gibson; Mathijs Tieken

Within Temptation chronology
Let Us Burn – Elements & Hydra Live in Concert (2014)	Resist (2019)	Bleed Out (2023)

Singles from Resist
- 1. "The Reckoning" Released: 14 September 2018; 2. "Raise Your Banner" Released: 16 November 2018; 3. "Firelight" Released: 23 November 2018; 4. "In Vain" Released: 11 January 2019; 5. "Supernova" Released: 5 February 2019; 6. "Mad World" Released: 15 April 2019

Resist (stylized as ЯƎSIST) is the seventh studio album by Dutch symphonic metal band Within Temptation. It was scheduled to be released worldwide on 14 December 2018, but later postponed to 1 February 2019. The album contains guest appearances by singers Jacoby Shaddix (Papa Roach), Anders Fridén (In Flames) and Jasper Steverlinck (Arid) and was produced by their longtime producer Daniel Gibson. It marks the longest time gap between the band's studio releases, the last one being issued in 2014. The album followed the band's pattern of incorporating new musical elements on each release, this time featuring more electronic, pop, and industrial influences. Lyrically, the band opted to focus more on political themes, a subject not explicitly approached by them on previous records.

Six singles were released for promoting the album, "The Reckoning", was released on 14 September 2018, and features Shaddix as guest vocalist. The second single, "Raise Your Banner", featuring Fridén, was released on 16 November 2018 and "Firelight", the third one, a week later, on 23 November. The other three singles were released in 2019, "In Vain" on 11 January, "Supernova" on 5 February, and "Mad World" on April 15. There was significant investment in the music videos, in order to better illustrate through imagery the themes featured on the release. The group also commenced The Resist Tour in Europe by the end of 2018, before the album release. In 2019, the band toured North America and then returned to Europe for performances at several summer festivals.

The album received generally favorable reviews from music critics, and the musical changes were one of the most discussed points. Reviewers from Kerrang and The Skinny were welcoming of the changes presented by the band, while AllMusic and PopMatters had some reservations. Nevertheless, it ended up appearing on a few Year-end lists such as Loudwire's. The album also achieved commercial success, peaking at the first position in Germany, and entering top ten positions in other countries, such as the Netherlands, Belgium, Finland, Austria and Switzerland.

== Background ==
After extensive promotion and touring for the album Hydra, between the years of 2014 and 2016, lead vocalist Sharon den Adel went through a process of exhaustion and suffered from a writer's block. She also went through personal problems, which led her to abandon writing for the band for a while to focus on herself. During this time, den Adel managed to start composing again, but this time for herself as a form to cope with her difficulties at the time. As these songs were not rock oriented or fit for the band, she then decided to release them as a solo project entitled My Indigo (2017). After going through this process and composing "smaller, much more direct, personal and vulnerable" tracks, the vocalist found herself again in the right state of mind to compose the "combative, powerful and big" songs that Within Temptation needed and is known for. In November 2017, while announcing her solo release, den Adel confirmed that the band was already back to the studio recording new songs for a possible 2018 album release, which was officially announced on 13 September 2018. It was also stated by the vocalist that this album was the most difficult one to be done by the band, as they didn't have any direction up until den Adel had recovered from her burnout and managed her personal problems. When they finally found a direction to pursue, the band was able to get the record done in less than a year. To this date, the album marked the longest gap between studio releases by the band, five years. In July 2018, Within Temptation signed a new recording contract with Vertigo Records Germany, which was selected to release the album worldwide, except in Japan. The album was originally scheduled to be released on 14 December 2018, but it was postponed to a 1 February 2019 release.

=== Conception ===
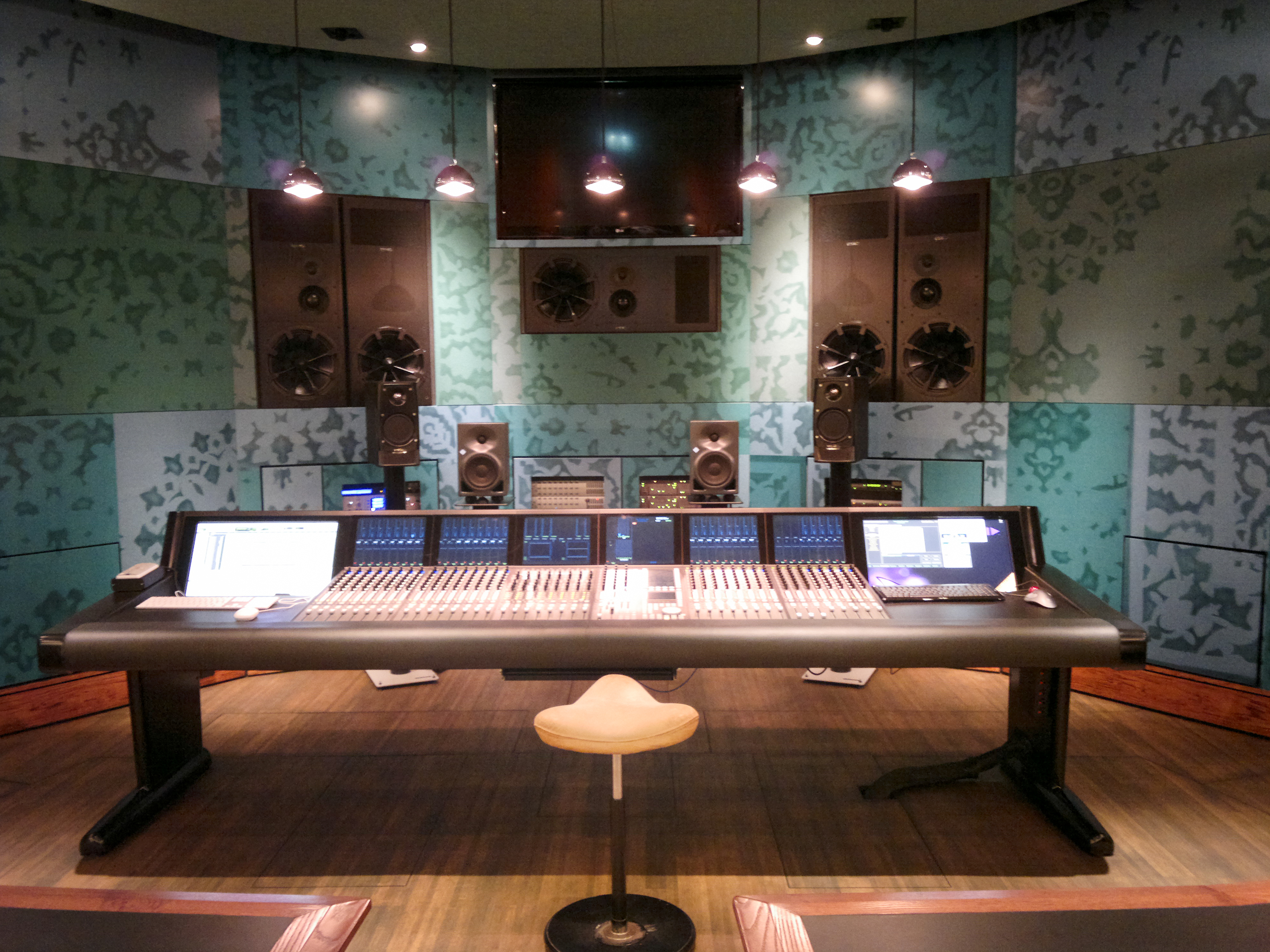
Some parts of the album were recorded at the Wisseloord Studios, in Hilversum, Netherlands.

The album was produced by the band's long-time producer Daniel Gibson and recorded at Wisseloord Studios and ICP Recording Studios. Mathijs Tieken also contributed as additional producer. For the writing and musical composition process, the band approached the songs on different ways. Den Adel focused on giving the songs "atmosphere" with Gibson, as she thought it would allow the songs to evolve naturally when you can go from the bigger picture to the smaller ones, like the choruses. On the other hand, Robert Westerholt focused on writing the choruses first and then progressing to the whole song.

The album features Papa Roach's Jacoby Shaddix, In Flames' Anders Fridén and Arid's Jasper Steverlinck as guest vocalists. Shaddix first met den Adel during the 2015 edition of Graspop Metal Meeting in Belgium. He was invited to provide vocals for the opening track and lead single "The Reckoning" after the song was already completed, as the band thought that he could provide the song a certain anger mixed with some vulnerability and melancholy. Fridén was invited to sing on "Raise Your Banner" as the band considered his experienced screaming voice would fit well the atmosphere and lyrics for that song. "Firelight" was originally composed for den Adel's solo album My Indigo. The song was at that time considered too dark to fit the release, and then was put on hold. After meeting Steverlinck on a Flemish TV show at the beginning of 2018, den Adel invited the singer to do a part on the song as she found that they had a real connection and their voices matched well together. After some reworking, it then ended up appearing on the final tracklist for the album. Regarding on when the musicians were invited as guests for the album during the recording process, den Adel commented that the band first writes a song and only after that they think of possible names. Within Temptation prefer to know what the song asks for, and then invite someone who they think would fit well in the track.

=== Development and composition ===
"We always try, but I think we succeeded a little bit more with this than with previous albums, to take steps forward more in progression and how the band evolves sound-wise. You want to sound like it's up to date, more modern in a way. That's what we tried to do, and I think this album achieved that very well -- at least for my tastes."

— Sharon den Adel telling Billboard about always trying to develop a new and updated sound on each album.

The album is considered primarily a symphonic metal album, although it features different influences. Speaking to Metal Hammer, den Adel stated that the album was inspired by "pop music", with a dark and metal oriented treatment, as the band felt that modern music hasn't been edgy or daring in recent years. Although taking it as an inspiration, the band pointed that it won't be a pop record and it probably won't have any airplay on pop radio stations. For the record, the band aimed to approach a more futuristic style while not discarding their original symphonic metal and bombastic musical roots. According to den Adel, the band didn't want to sound too far from their original style, but also wanted to have their main musical elements recognizable throughout the songs, which resulted on the blend between elements from their old style and modern music elements as electronic parts and the said futuristic approach. The title of the album itself, according to den Adel, represents "not being put in a box and refusing to do what other people are trying to influence you in a way that you might see just one side of the story".

Besides the musical aspects, inspiration for the album also came for contemporary technological and political aspects. According to the singer, the fact that everyone is traceable today intrigued her and had her wondering about whether it would be beneficial for the population, as in cases of national security, or not, in cases of dictatorships. She had also found herself intrigued and annoyed by the algorithms behind merchandising offers and purchasing suggestions, and felt that it was putting people on boxes according to their supposed personal tastes based on what they look for in the internet, restricting them from having new interests and points of view. Regarding to this, den Adel stated that "Resist, for me, it's a personal message but also a political statement. Before, we did not talk so openly about our political views, but today we do it more.[...] To return to the "political" message, it is always with a positive aim, hoping that in the future, things will really change." Despite containing a central theme, the record wasn't thought as a concept album and therefore not all songs were lyrically inspired by the same main subject, as the band also addresses subjects from their personal lives.

The opening track, "The Reckoning", takes inspiration from political themes and addresses a possible loss of freedom in the future. Musically, it features alternative metal influences and contains heavy riffs from an eight-string guitar. Regarding the symphonic elements of the songs, the band opted to use only where they found it would have an impact instead of in the whole song, in order to offer a bigger showcase of the other instruments and den Adel's vocals. It is explicit on the second track, "Endless War", which features choirs and more symphonic elements with underlined electronic sounds. The singer stated that the loss of individuality might even compromise democracy, as people are fed information that is calculed by their personal tastes and positions, difficulting them to search or understand other worldviews. This theme was mainly aborded on the track "Raise Your Banner". According to her, the song draws inspiration from protests that happened during the decade of 1980, where people went to the streets claim their rights and contrasts it with the online protests from nowadays, which she considers more passive and lacks resistance.

"Supernova" is a song about hope, and was dedicated in memory of den Adel's father, who had died in April 2018. The track contains outer space references and metaphors relating to a person that still wants a sign from the afterlife of someone already gone, and searches for it on the skies. It features mainly EDM influences while also containing orchestral passages and verses sang by a choir, and was originally conceived as an uptempo, symphonic, and dreamlike song. The track "Holy Ground" also takes politic matters as subject and argues that people should have their limits respected regarding their individuality, and its title acts as a metaphor for personal themes related to one person's personal space, such as gender, race, or other personal subjects. "In Vain" also addresses the loss of someone and the emptiness derived from it. The song features softer rock stylings and has a more "down-to-earth" production. "Firelight", which was not originally composed for the album, is a ballad song and contains a "dark and folk" atmosphere and gothic influences. On the other hand, the track "Mad World" is a mid-tempo song that has a bombastic atmosphere and features more industrial influences. "Mercy Mirror" is another personal song, and it deals with forgiviness on a relationship that has been hurting the people involved for years by not saying or discussing issues the proper way. It is composed as a piano and strings-driven, uplifting ballad. The closing track "Trophy Hunter" is also heavily guitar driven, and features male choirs. It combines the main symphonic and electronic elements incorporated on the record.

=== Cover ===
For the first time, the band did not use a custom cover art for an album. Instead, they bought a piece of artwork from artist Emmanuel Shiu on DeviantArt. On an interview to French radio station Radio Metal, den Adel explained:

Books are always a great source of inspiration for us, but this time we did not find any inspiration from this side. So we looked on the internet trying to find some inspiration. Robert (Westerholt) found this photo on the interview and it was really perfect, exactly what we needed. [...] We reached out to him [Shiu] and bought several pieces of his work. It really explains the idea on the digital age and the 'Big Brother is watching you'. It's like all the puzzle pieces were in this illustration.

The album artwork and the music videos follow the same theme as the cover art; the album's layout makes it look like the band is inside a spaceship, and for this reason the video for "The Reckoning" features a spaceship.

== Promotion ==
The videos for "The Reckoning" and "Raise Your Banner" pictured above and below, respectively, feature science fiction themes. The band invested in them as radio stations weren't a reliable way of promoting heavy music.

At the end of November 2017, before any signs of releasing new material, the band announced a European tour for the end of 2018 in hope for a possible release on that same year, considering that they had already some newly written songs. At the beginning of December, almost a year before the tour, two concerts were already sold out. The first single, entitled "The Reckoning", was released the day after the official album announcement, on 14 September 2018, alongside a lyric video. The single features Shaddix as a guest vocalist. On 24 September, the official music video for it was officially released. The video was shot on the island of Fuerteventura, one of the Canary Islands, and featured the band members walking through a desert on a post-apocalyptic landscape while facing extraterrestrial threats. The music video earned the band a nomination for the Edison Award in the Best Video category. Dutch newspaper AD.nl stated on their website that the band was looking for extras for a new music video, in which the recording would be taking place on 7 October 2018, in the city of Zaandam. The newspaper published that they were seeking strong men to play futuristic police officers, and also thinner men and women to portray futuristic robots. A few days later, the Dutch newspaper Tubantia stated that the chosen song was "Raise Your Banner", and the music video would be directed by Rogier Hendriks. The single was released on 16 November 2018, accompanied by a lyric video. Its official music video was released on November 30. The third song chosen to receive a music video was "Supernova", which was released on 5 February 2019, four days after the album release. The video was the first by the band to have its premiere handed by American magazine Billboard. Three other singles were released without an accompanying music video. "Firelight" was released on 23 November 2018 for digital download and streaming. "In Vain" was released on 11 January 2019, and received a lyric video. "Mad World" was the last single of the album, being released on 15 April, also accompanied by a lyric video.

=== Tour ===
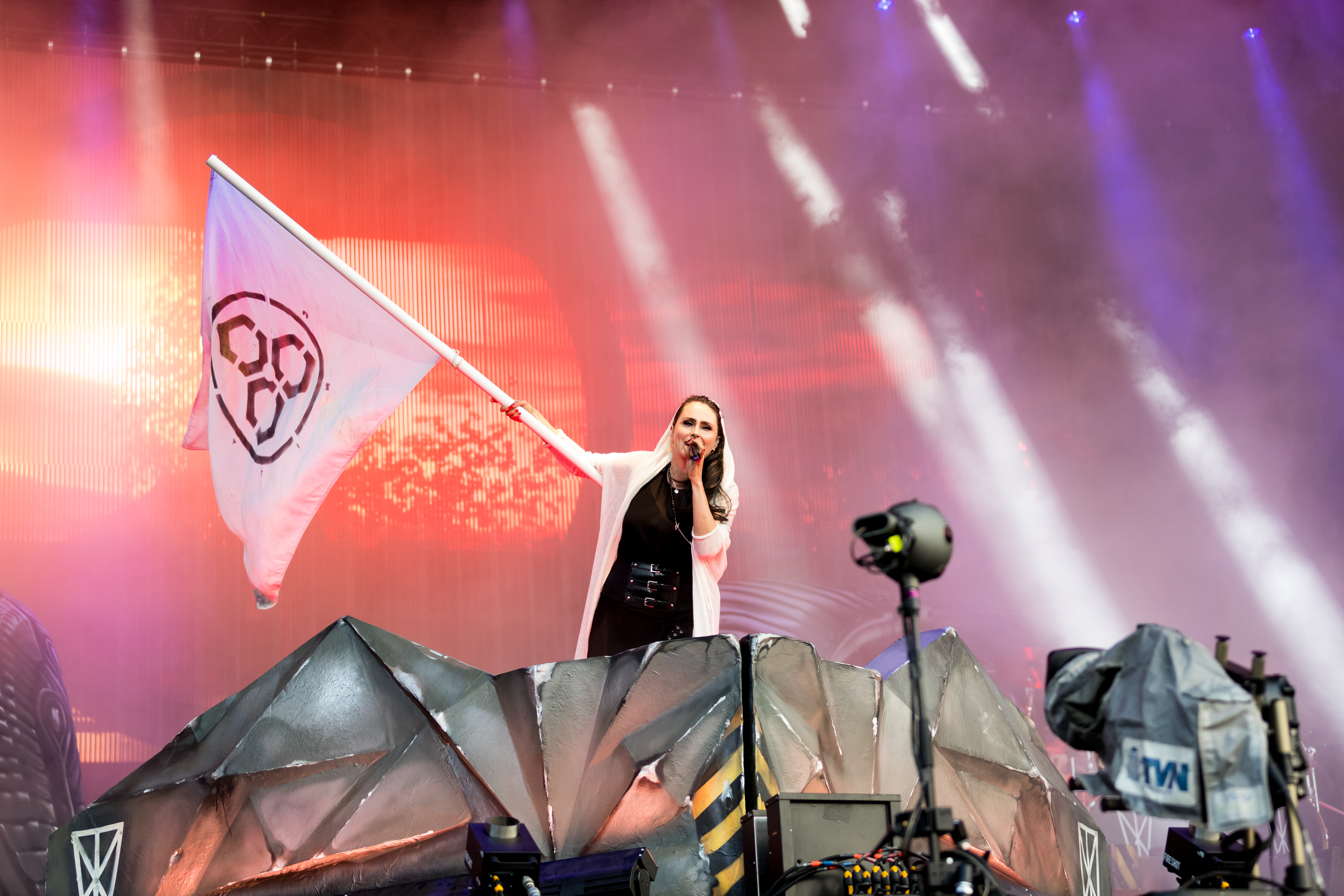
Sharon den Adel performing the track "Raise Your Banner" on a Resist-themed stage at the 2019 Wacken Open Air.

The band embarked on their The Resist Tour on 11 October 2018. Initially, only club and arena dates throughout Europe were added to the tour, visiting seventeen countries, before the band started scheduling dates for some 2019 summer festivals. This first indoor part of the tour counted with German and Brazilian bands Beyond the Black and Ego Kill Talent, respectively, as opening acts. The day after the 2018 edition of the Wacken Open Air, the festival announced the band as a performer for next year's edition. Due to den Adel's decision to spend more time at home in order to be more present on her children's life, which was getting difficult due to the band's heavy touring schedule from previous years, the tour dates were elaborated for this tour with normally two weeks on tour and two weeks off. At the end of 2018, it was announced a new leg of the tour passing through North America. It began in 2019, with In Flames as special guests. After the North American leg, the band then commenced another round of concerts throughout Europe, consisting of festival presentations and special concerts at palace gardens. The band was scheduled to play at the Byblos International Festival in Lebanon, but as the festival was facing violent religious threats for having LGBT supporters Mashrou' Leila on the line-up, the band decided to cancel their concert in solidarity with them and in support of "tolerance, freedom of speech and expression". A second row of summer concerts was scheduled for 2020, but the festivals had to be canceled due to the COVID-19 pandemic.

The tour featured special stage and costumes designs related to the futuristic and technological themes of the album. Steel-like ornaments, special stage lighting effects, projection screens, and fog machines were also used in order to intensify the atmosphere of the songs. The band male members made use of special futuristic uniforms, and den Adel of a futuristic black dress, a white cloak, and a special flag for the opening song "Raise Your Banner". Guitarist Robert Westerholt was part of the visuals selection to set the stage, as the band wanted to create a special concert imagery that would fit the experience of listening to the album.

== Reception ==
Professional ratings
Aggregate scores
Source	Rating
Metacritic	67/100
Review scores
Source	Rating
AllMusic	3/5 stars
Daily Express	4/5 stars
Kerrang!	4/5 stars
PopMatters	5/10
The Music	3.5/5 stars
The Skinny	4/5 stars
Ultimate Guitar	7/10
Volkskrant	4/5 stars

Resist received generally favorable reviews from music critics. Based on five reviews, the review-aggregating website Metacritic gave the album an average score of 67. Reviewer Gary Trueman writing for British webzine Devolution was positive about the record, praising its freshness amongst a musical genre that has got staler over the years, as the band were able to give contemporary pop music a "dark coat". The reviewer also praised Sharon den Adel's vocal performance while pointing out that, even as a high point, it didn't overshadow the band. Trueman ended his review stating that the album could be Within Temptation's "Fallen moment", as he considered it "by far the best album they've put out to date". In his four star review, Steve Beebee from Kerrang! was also positive about the record. Beebee described the hard times the band went through in their personal lives before the release, and considered that the album "distils [sic] that time of trauma, healing and new beginnings into 47 dazzling minutes". Beebee was also positive about the new musical styles incorporated on the record, even if it might not please listeners who dislike changes, and its overall flow, stating that the songs "breathe together, and thrive when heard as a whole". Paul Davies, from the Daily Express, also praised the album's strong energy. Australian magazine The Music also commented positively about the new elements incorporated, such as the EDM influences on the track "Supernova" and the pop and industrial on the track "Mad World", while also praising the album's overall songwriting and cohesiveness.

On the other hand, the publishing team for the German edition of Metal Hammer was divided by the album, which led them to publish one 5 stars out of 7 positive review and one 3 stars out of 7 negative review. Whilst the positive one welcomed the new elements and styles adopted by the band on the album, the negative one criticized the record as being "radio-pop" and considered some of its compositions and instrumentations "plastic". AllMusic's James Monger gave Resist a lukewarm review, stating that "in shifting gears to stoke their creative flames, Within Temptation have created an immersive - if not wholly original-sounding - set of songs that play to both their strengths and weaknesses". Deborah Krieger, from PopMatters, was less welcoming of the musical changes, and considered the album thematically flawed.

=== Accolades ===
Resist ended up appearing on 2019 year-end lists from critics and magazines. Steve Beebee from Kerrang! awarded the album the fourth position in his top 10 metal albums of 2019. From the Metal Hammer staff, Holly Wright placed the album at number 12 in her top 20 metal albums of 2019 list, Merlin Alderslade and Natasha Sharf at number 14, and Vanessa Thorpe at number 20. Readers from the magazine also voted the album as the 8th best of the decade. On Loudwire, the album appeared both at the Best Metal Albums half-year list and the respective year-end list. Despite not giving specific positions to the 50 albums selected, the staff commented that "there's elasticity to the beat-driven Resist album, with swaths of synths and orchestration splashing down as den Adel's siren call guides the way."

== Commercial performance ==
The album debuted at number one in Germany on 8 February 2019, making it the band's highest charting album in the country, surpassing the peak reached by their previous studio album Hydra (2014), which had charted at number four. The band also reached again its peak position in Belgium with the album debuting at number two, a position previously reached only by their fourth studio album, The Heart of Everything (2007). In the Netherlands, Resist debuted at number two, one position behind Hydra. In the United Kingdom, the album reached the 15 position on the UK Albums Chart, their second best to date. The album also managed to reach number one on the UK Rock & Metal Albums Charts and the tenth position overall based solely on physical copies sales. In the United States, the band was met with their lowest debut to date, entering the charts at position number 129. However, at the Top Album Sales, which accounts the total amount of pure sales from the album in its entirety and excludes streams and separate track sales, the album entered the charts at the 13 position. It also sold more physical copies when compared to its digital sales and streams in France, and while the album debuted at number 22 on the overall charts, it reached number 11 on the physical chart. In Finland, where the album managed to reach the fourth position on the official charts, and the second on the physical one.

== Track listing ==
Standard Edition
No.	Title	Writer(s)	Length
1.	"The Reckoning" (featuring Jacoby Shaddix)	Sharon den Adel; Robert Westerholt; Daniel Gibson	4:11
2.	"Endless War"	den Adel; Westerholt; Gibson	4:09
3.	"Raise Your Banner" (featuring Anders Fridén)	den Adel; Westerholt; Gibson; Mathijs Tieken	5:34
4.	"Supernova"	den Adel; Westerholt; Gibson; William Knox	5:34
5.	"Holy Ground"	den Adel; Westerholt; Gibson	4:10
6.	"In Vain"	den Adel; Westerholt; Gibson; Knox	4:25
7.	"Firelight" (featuring Jasper Steverlinck)	den Adel; Gibson; Sarah De Courcy Astos; Daniel Barkman	4:46
8.	"Mad World"	den Adel; Westerholt; Gibson	4:57
9.	"Mercy Mirror"	den Adel; Westerholt; Gibson	3:49
10.	"Trophy Hunter"	den Adel; Westerholt; Stefan Helleblad; Emma Bjernvall	5:51
Total length:			47:43

Extended deluxe
No.	Title	Length
11.	"Raise Your Banner" (single edit)	3:32
12.	"Endless War" (single edit)	3:42
13.	"Firelight" (single edit)	3:50
14.	"Mad World" (single edit)	3:38
15.	"Supernova" (single edit)	3:35
16.	"The Reckoning" (instrumental)	4:11
17.	"Endless War" (instrumental)	4:09
18.	"Raise Your Banner" (instrumental)	5:33
19.	"Supernova" (instrumental)	5:33
20.	"Holy Ground" (instrumental)	4:08
21.	"In Vain" (instrumental)	4:25
22.	"Firelight" (instrumental)	4:46
23.	"Mad World" (instrumental)	4:57
24.	"Mercy Mirror" (instrumental)	3:49
25.	"Trophy Hunter" (instrumental)	5:52
Total length:		1:53:19

== Personnel ==
Credits adapted from the liner notes of Resist.

Within Temptation

- Sharon den Adel – lead vocals
- Ruud Jolie – lead guitar
- Robert Westerholt – rhythm guitar
- Stefan Helleblad – rhythm guitar
- Jeroen van Veen – bass
- Martijn Spierenburg – keyboards
- Mike Coolen – drums

Additional musicians

- Jacoby Shaddix – male vocals on "The Reckoning"
- Anders Fridén – male vocals on "Raise Your Banner"
- Jasper Steverlinck – male vocals on "Firelight"

Production

- Daniel Gibson – producer
- Mathijs Tieken – producer
- Stefan Helleblad – engineer
- Taylor Larson – mixing
- Brian Gardner – mastering
- Emmanuel Shiu – cover art

== Charts ==
=== Weekly charts ===
Chart (2019)	Peak position
Australian Albums (ARIA)	13
Austrian Albums (Ö3 Austria)	4
Belgian Albums (Ultratop Flanders)	2
Belgian Albums (Ultratop Wallonia)	5
Canadian Albums (Billboard)	64
Czech Albums (ČNS IFPI)	12
Dutch Albums (Album Top 100)	2
Finnish Albums (Suomen virallinen lista)	4
French Albums (SNEP)	22
German Albums (Offizielle Top 100)	1
Greek Albums (IFPI)	45
Hungarian Albums (MAHASZ)	8
Italian Albums (FIMI)	84
Japanese Albums (Oricon)	55
Japanese Hot Albums (Billboard Japan)	67
Polish Albums (ZPAV)	18
Portuguese Albums (AFP)	13
Scottish Albums (Official Charts)	9
Slovak Albums (ČNS IFPI)	19
Spanish Albums (Promusicae)	20
Swedish Albums (Sverigetopplistan)	11
Swiss Albums (Schweizer Hitparade)	2
UK Albums (Official Charts)	15
UK Rock & Metal Albums (Official Charts)	1
US Billboard 200	129
US Top Hard Rock Albums	5
US Top Rock Albums	19

=== Monthly charts ===
Chart (2019)	Position
Czech Albums (ČNS IFPI)	18
Slovak Albums (ČNS IFPI)	46

=== Year-end charts ===
Chart (2019)	Position
Belgian Albums (Ultratop Flanders)	94

== Release history ==
Region	Date	Format	Label	Ref.
Various	1 February 2019	CD; digital download; streaming; vinyl; cassette	Vertigo Records	
United Kingdom	1 February 2019	CD; digital download; streaming; vinyl; cassette	Spinefarm Records	
Japan	1 February 2019	CD; digital download; streaming; vinyl	Victor	

== See also ==
- List of number-one hits of 2019 (Germany)
- List of UK Rock & Metal Albums Chart number ones of 2019
