= Noord-Waddinxveen =

Coordinates: 52°3′15″N 4°38′25″E

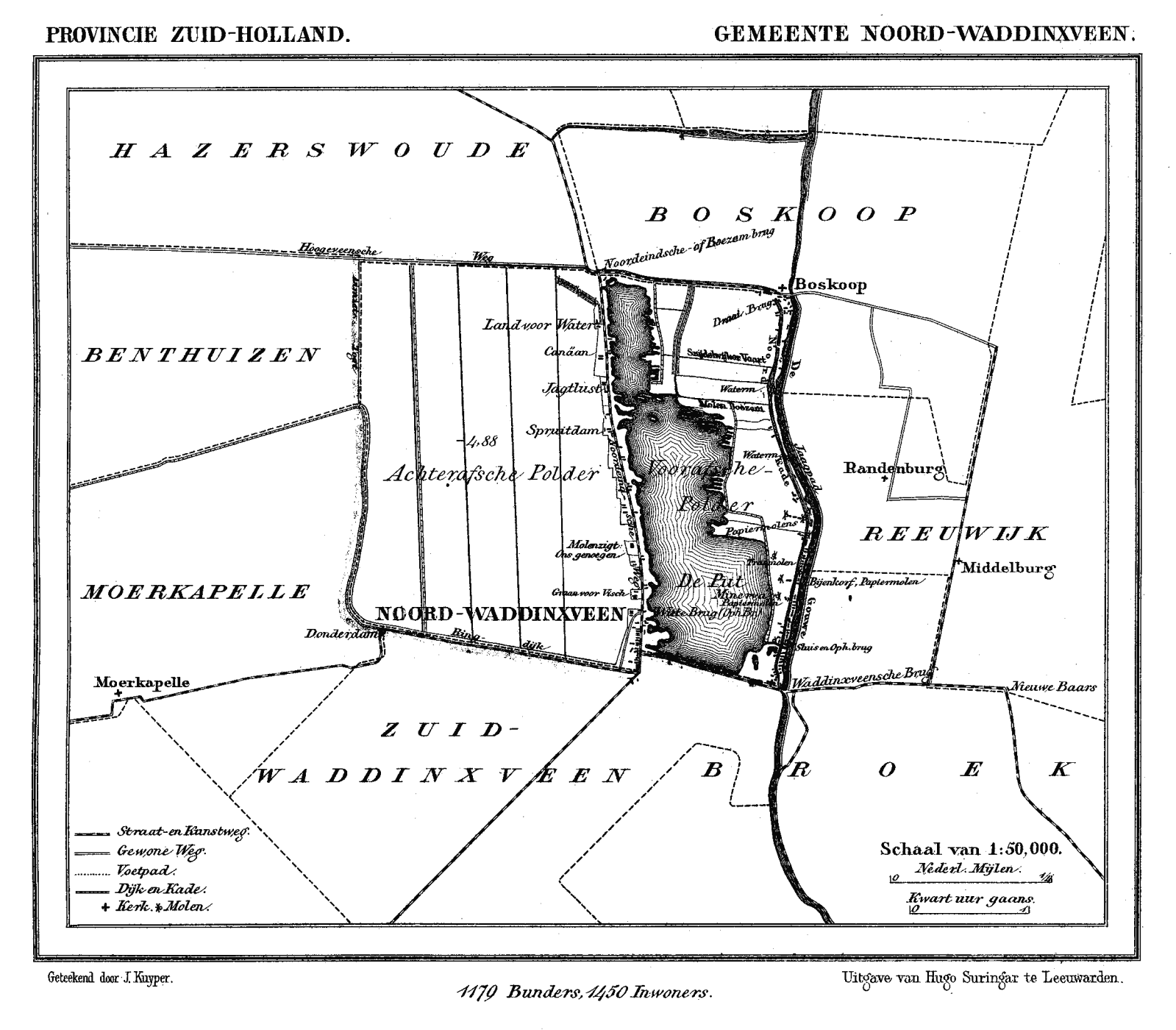
Map of Noord Waddinxveen from 1868

Noord-Waddinxveen is a former municipality in the Dutch province of South Holland. It covered the northern half of the village Waddinxveen.

The municipality existed between 1817 and 1870, when it merged with Zuid-Waddinxveen.
