= Waddinxveen =

- Municipality
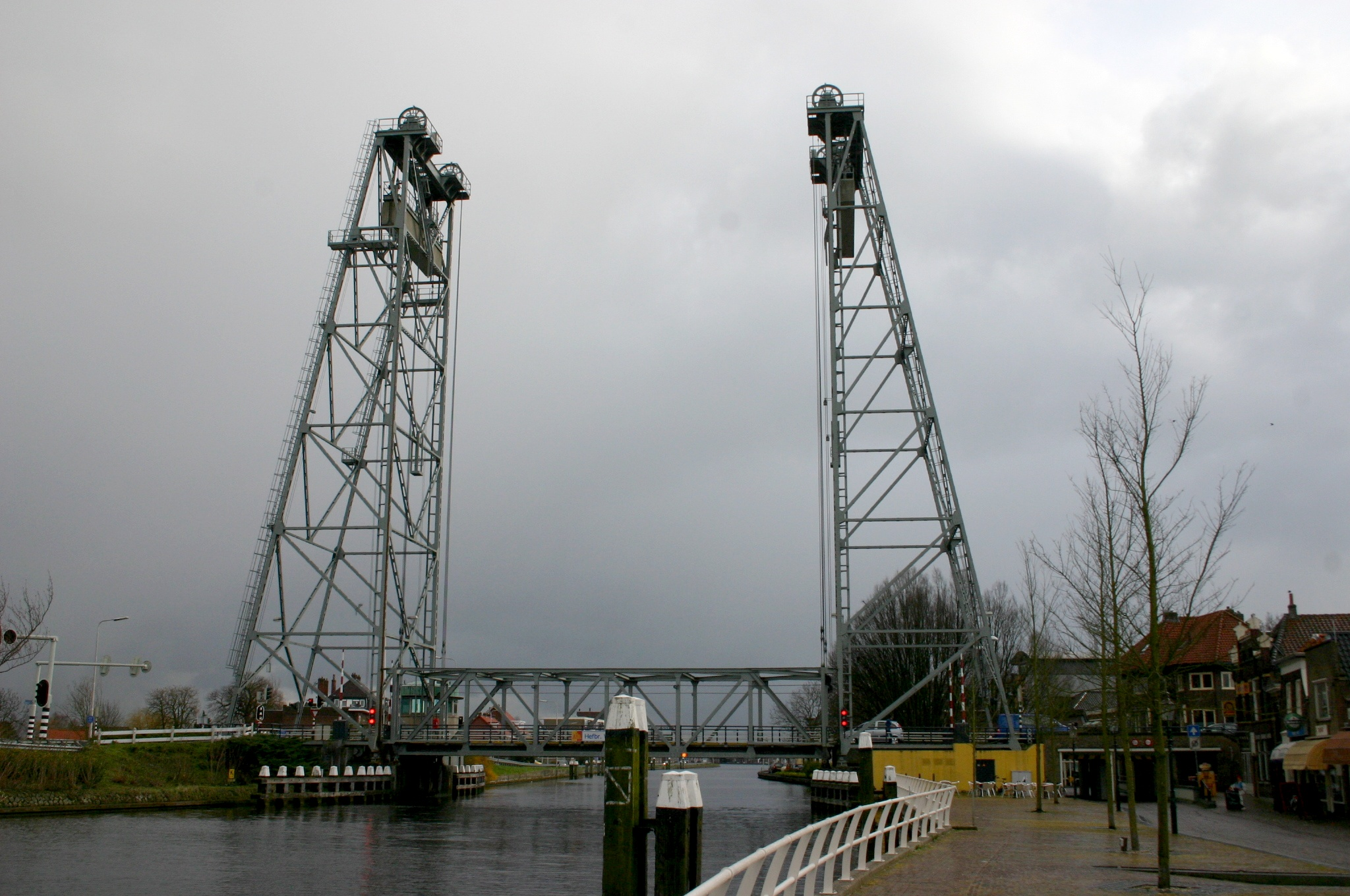
- Vertical-lift bridge over the Gouwe in Waddinxveen

- Flag Coat of arms

- Location in South Holland
- Coordinates: 52°3′N 4°39′E
- Country: Netherlands
- Province: South Holland

Government
  - Body: Municipal council
  - Mayor: Evert Jan Nieuwenhuis (SGP)

Area
  - Total: 29.40 km^{2} (11.35 sq mi)
  - Land: 27.77 km^{2} (10.72 sq mi)
  - Water: 1.63 km^{2} (0.63 sq mi)
- Elevation: −2 m (−6.6 ft)

Population (January 2021)
  - Total: 30,479
  - Density: 1,098/km^{2} (2,840/sq mi)
- Demonym: Waddinxvener
- Time zone: UTC+1 (CET)
  - Summer (DST): UTC+2 (CEST)
- Postcode: 2740–2743
- Area code: 0182
- Website: www.waddinxveen.nl

Waddinxveen (Dutch pronunciation: [ˌʋɑdɪŋksˈfeːn]) is a town and municipality along the Gouwe river in the western Netherlands in the province of South Holland near Gouda. The municipality had a population of 30,479 in 2021 and covers an area of 29.40 km^{2} (11.35 sq mi) of which 1.63 km^{2} (0.63 sq mi) is water.

A small piece of artwork named De Vergeten Plek (Dutch for 'The Forgotten Place') marks the lowest point on the Dutch polders, 7.01 meters below Amsterdam Ordnance Datum.

== History ==
The first reference to the area is from 1233, when on April 20, Floris IV, Count of Holland, sold an area of peat lands along the Gouwe River for 200 Dutch pounds to Nicolas of Gnepwijk, Lord of Aalsmeer and Woubrecht. The area was given the name "Waddinxvene". Because of this event, Waddinxveen celebrated its 750-year anniversary in 1983.

Between 1817 and 1870, Waddinxveen was dissolved and its area split into the municipalities of Noord-Waddinxveen and Zuid-Waddinxveen. Due to further expanding, those two municipalities reunited into one.

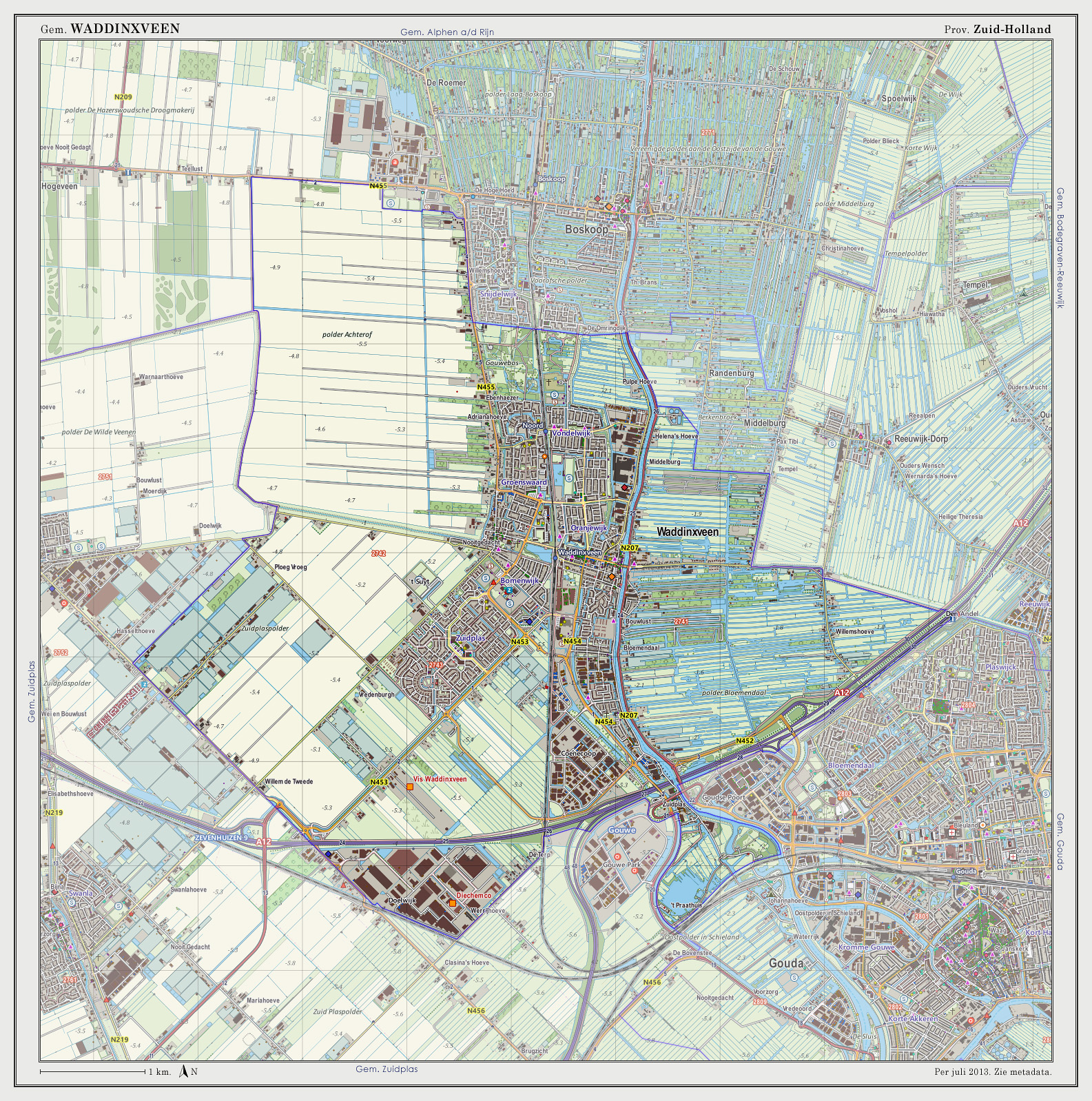
Topographic map of Waddinxveen, July 2013

== Notable people ==
- Tjark de Vries (born 1965), rower
- Mark Vanderloo (born 1968), model
- Pepijn van den Nieuwendijk (born 1970), painter and ceramist
- Mirjam Overdam (born 1973), water polo player
- Sharon den Adel (born 1974), songwriter, singer and fashion designer
- Robert Westerholt (born 1975), musician and guitarist
- Martijn Westerholt (born 1979), keyboardist and songwriter
- Roald van Hout (born 1988), footballer

== Gallery ==
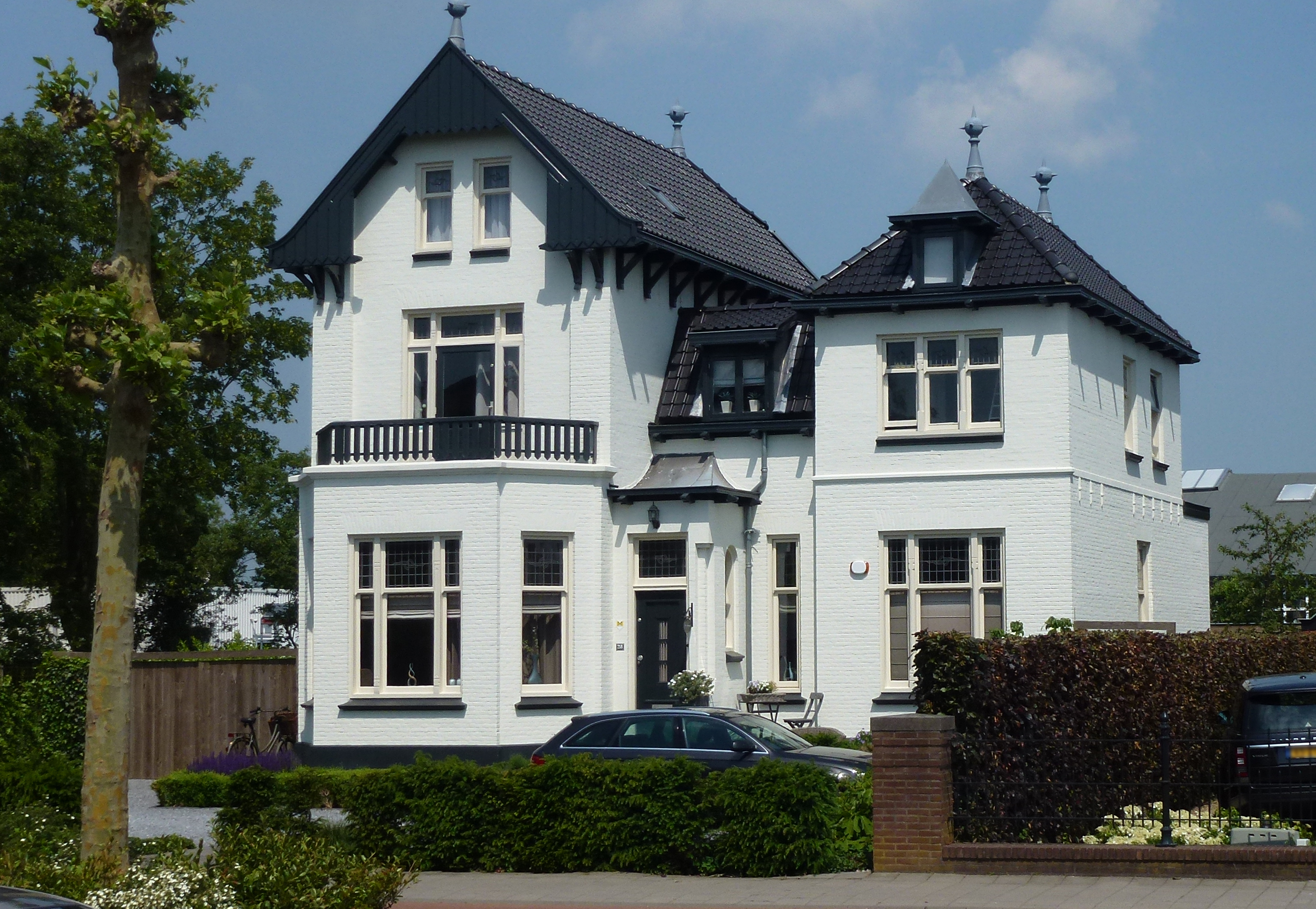
Kerkweg-Oost, Waddinxveen

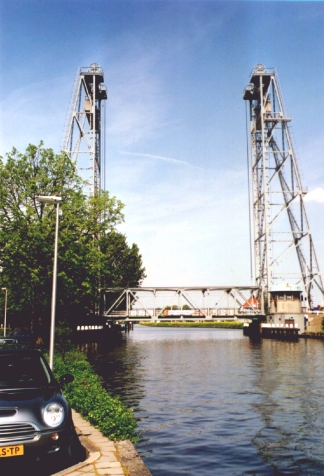
The Hefbrug bridge at Waddinxveen crossing the Gouwe

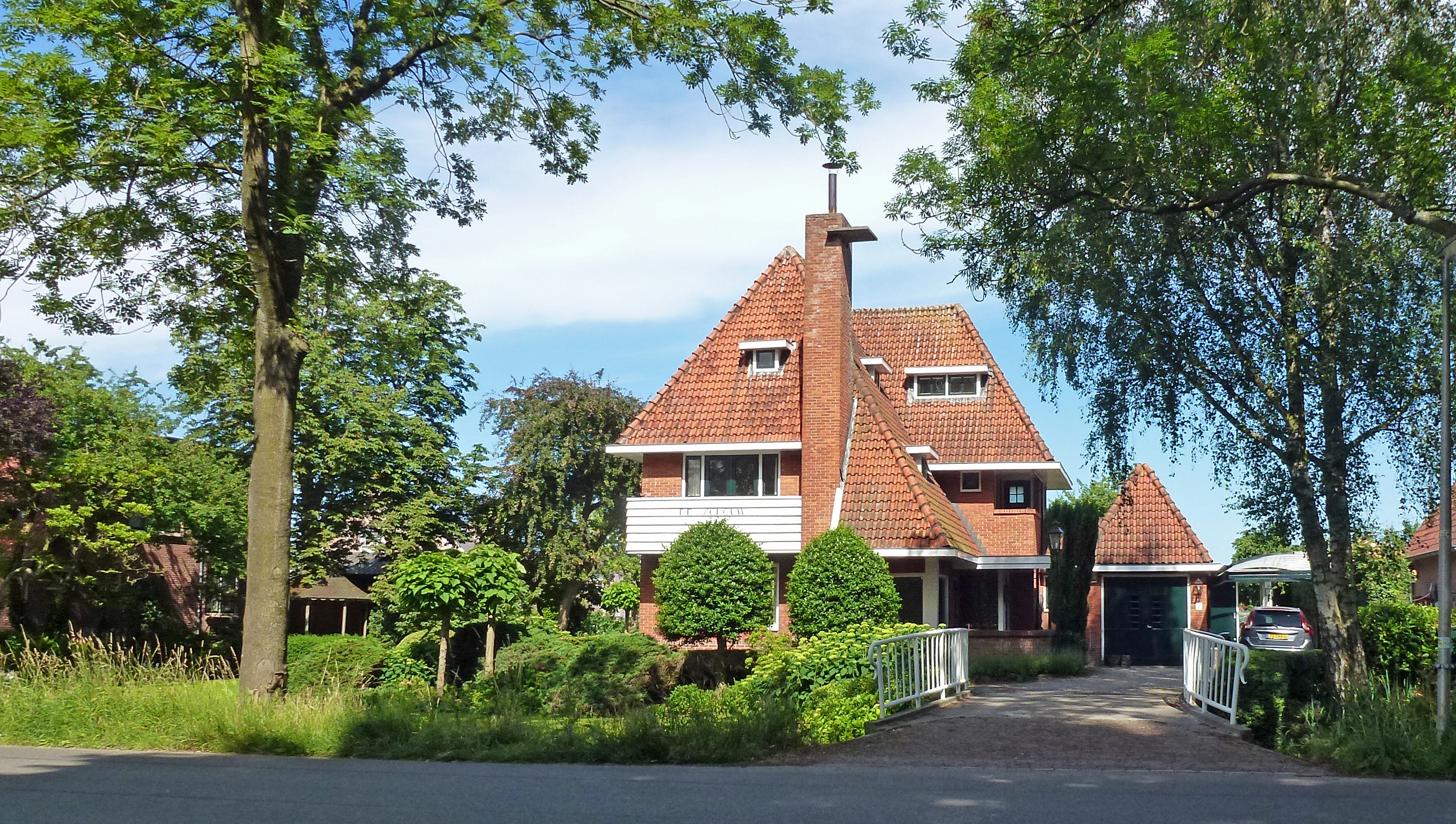
Plasweg, Waddinxveen. De Schouw

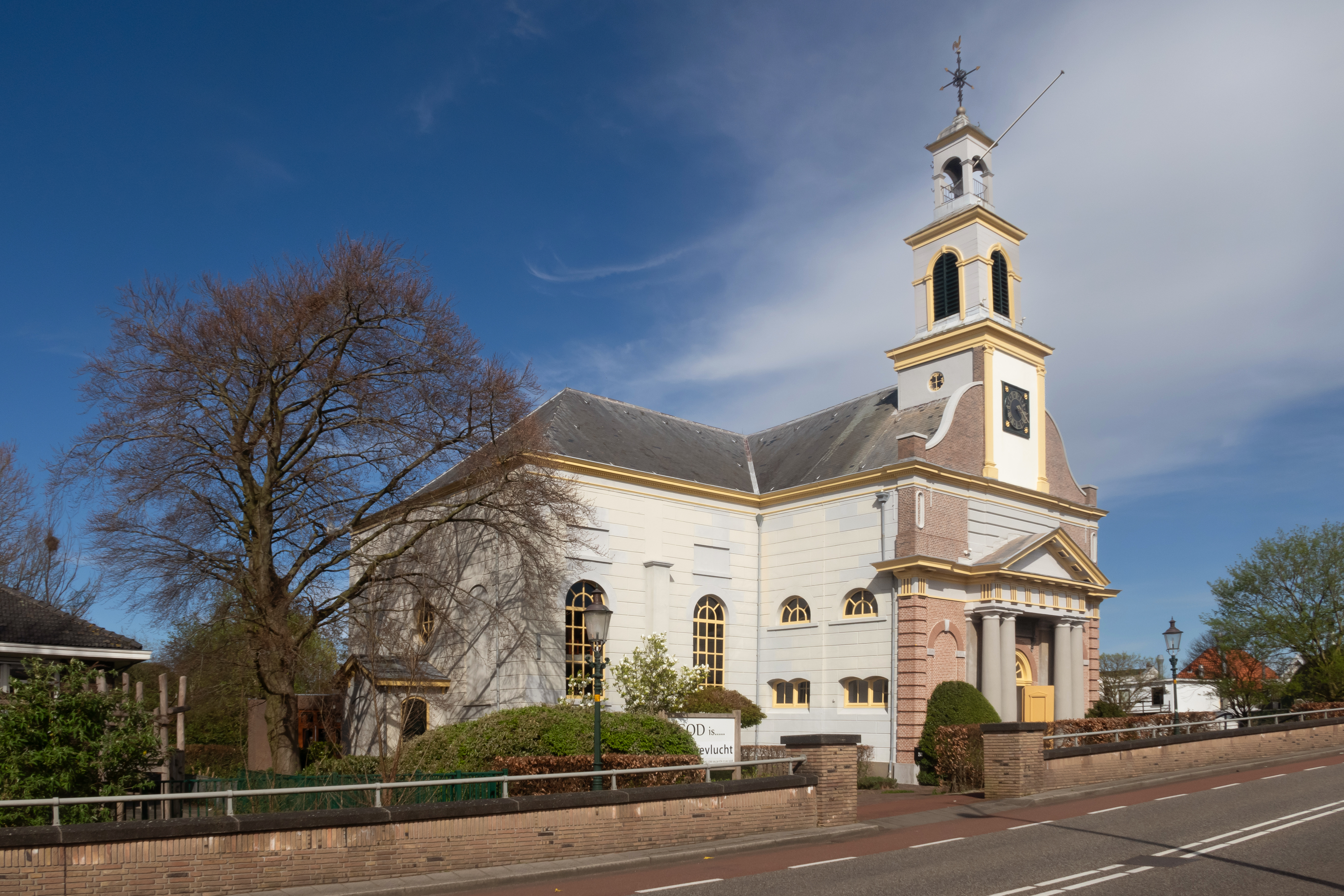
The Brug church
