= My Indigo (album) =

Studio album by My Indigo
- Released: 20 April 2018
- Recorded: 2016–2017
- Genres: Pop; electronic pop
- Length: 38:43
- Label: BMG
- Producers: Sharon den Adel; Daniel Gibson

Singles from My Indigo
- 1. "My Indigo" Released: 10 November 2017

My Indigo is the debut studio album by Dutch singer and songwriter Sharon den Adel with her solo musical project My Indigo. It was released on 20 April 2018. The track listing of the debut album was released on 31 January 2018 by Within Temptation fansite DontTearMeDown.

== Background ==
After returning from Within Temptation latest tour, going through a writer's block while composing songs for their next album, and also having undisclosed personal problems, den Adel decided to compose for herself as a form to cope with these problems. As the sound differed considerably from what the singer is known for in the metal scene and after seeing the results, it was then decided to release these songs publicly as a solo project album. Later, the singer revealed that the familiar problems consisted on her father's illness and death.

Fearing a permanent loss of her creativity to write for her band and not being able to reach the needed feelings for that again, den Adel stated she could find inspiration in this situation itself while composing more introspective and soul searching songs. The singer noted that while Within Temptation songs are more "combative, powerful and big", the songs in this project are "smaller, much more direct, personal and vulnerable", which has enabled her to achieve the other extreme of her songwriting without affecting her work with the band. The singer took inspiration from both contemporary music and 80s songs she grew up with, as a form of revisiting her youth and her personal journey.

The composing process was also different, as den Adel sometimes worked upon the lyrics first and just later on giving it melodies and vocal lines, which is the opposite process of what she used to do previously. The name of the project and album came from the "light" but "moody" feeling that the color provides, as according to the singer it fitted well the main atmosphere of the songs. The first single, also entitled My Indigo, was released on November 10, 2017. The song "Firelight" was originally composed for the album, but it was considered too dark to fit the release at that time and put on hold. After some reworking, it then ended up appearing on Within Temptation's seventh studio album Resist, released in 2019.

== Critical reception ==
Professional ratings
Review scores
Source	Rating
Express & Star	3.5/5 stars
Louder Than War	3/5 stars
Metal Hammer	5/7

Music critic Mike Ainscoe, from Louder Than War, called the album "vulnerable", "introspective" and stated that its main signature is den Adel's emotional vocals. Ainscoe noted a "Euro glossiness that’s glazed with contemporary pop" and a heavy influence of eighties music on the songs, with even some reggae influences as on the track "Indian Summer". Besides that, he considered the album safe and not too far from den Adel's comfort zone as a musician, and finished his review commenting that the singer "revealed a hidden, vulnerable and meditative side that flies below the Within Temptation power and bravado."

Leigh Sanders, from Express & Star, was also positive about the album in her 7 out of 10 review. Sanders considered the record "a delicious slice of electronic pop with thumping beats", praising den Adel's vocals and citing the track "Crash and Burn" as the highlight of the album, while also noting some commodities from her metal career as percussion plays a key role. Sanders concluded her review alleging that "it is these expressive and exciting bursts of thunder that make each track more than just another pop song."

Metal Hammer's Lisa Gratzke was also positive about the album, praising the lyrics and technical aspects while also noting some indie pop influences. Gratzke highlighted the fact that the album was a "way out of [den Adel's] crisis" and concluded her review commenting that it is "a beautiful excursion into unfamiliar realms, a mild summer breeze, enchanting with its lightness and still existing depth".

== Track listing ==
No.	Title	Writer(s)	Length
1.	"My Indigo"	Sharon den Adel; Daniel Gibson; Will Knox	3:25
2.	"Crash and Burn"	Daniel Barkman; Gibson; den Adel	4:37
3.	"Black Velvet Sun"	Gibson; den Adel; Robert Westerholt	3:30
4.	"Indian Summer"	Gibson; den Adel; Knox	2:51
5.	"Out of the Darkness"	Gibson; den Adel; Martijn Konijnenburg	3:57
6.	"Star Crossed Lovers"	Bruce F. Smith; Barkman; Gibson; den Adel; Westerholt	3:07
7.	"Someone Like You"	Gibson; den Adel; Konijnenburg; Knox	3:12
8.	"Safe and Sound"	Barkman; Gibson; den Adel	5:42
9.	"Lesson Learned"	Gibson; den Adel; Westerholt	3:53
10.	"Where Is My Love"	Barkman; Gibson; den Adel	4:29
Total length:			38:43

The track listing has a slightly different track list "Out of the Darkness" is track 3 on the digital release but track 5 on the cd release; "Black Velvet Sun" is track 3 on the cd release but track 5 on the digital release.

== Personnel ==
- Sharon den Adel – lead vocals
- Will Knox – guitars, ukulele, backing vocals
- Martijn Konijnenburg – keyboards
- Teus Nobel – trumpet
- Kevin de Randamie – voice-over on track 2
- Daniel Gibson – keyboards, production, programming
- Daniel Barkman – additional production
- Michael Ilbert – mixing
- Björn Engelmann – mastering

== Charts ==
Chart (2018)	Peak position
Austrian Albums (Ö3 Austria)	47
Belgian Albums (Ultratop Flanders)	6
Belgian Albums (Ultratop Wallonia)	79
Dutch Albums (Album Top 100)	3
French Albums (SNEP)	110
German Albums (Offizielle Top 100)	39
Scottish Albums (Official Charts)	52
Swiss Albums (Schweizer Hitparade)	27
UK Albums (Official Charts)	100
UK Independent Albums (Official Charts)	7
