= Firelight (song) =

Single by Within Temptation featuring Jasper Steverlinck

from the album Resist
- Released: 23 November 2018
- Recorded: 2018
- Length: 4:47 (album version); 3:50 (single version)
- Label: Vertigo
- Songwriter(s): Sharon den Adel; Daniel Gibson; Sarah De Courcy Astos; Daniel Barkman
- Producer(s): Daniel Gibson; Within Temptation; Mathijs Tieken

Within Temptation featuring Jasper Steverlinck singles chronology
"Raise Your Banner" (2018)	"Firelight" (2018)	"In Vain" (2019)

"Firelight" is the third single from Dutch symphonic metal band Within Temptation's seventh studio album Resist, and features guest vocals from Jasper Steverlinck of Arid. It was released worldwide via digital download and streaming on 23 November 2018.

== Background ==
"Firelight" is a ballad song originally composed for Sharon den Adel's solo album My Indigo. The song was at that time considered too dark to fit the release, and then was put on hold. After meeting Jasper Steverlinck on a flemish tv show, den Adel invited the singer to do a part on the song as she found that they had a real connection and their voices matched well together. After some reworking, it then ended up appearing on den Adel's band Within Temptation seventh studio album Resist official tracklist. The song is considered dark and atmospheric and, according to Metal Hammer, it oscillates between a "mystic goth and dark folk" mood. It later entered the Ultratip Bubbling Under charts in Belgium.

== Track listing ==
Digital download
No.	Title	Writer(s)	Length
1.	"Firelight" (Album version)	Sharon den Adel; Daniel Gibson; Sarah De Courcy Astos; Daniel Barkman	4:47
2.	"Firelight" (Single edit)	den Adel; Gibson; De Courcy Astos; Barkman	3:50

== Personnel ==
Within Temptation

- Sharon den Adel – lead vocals
- Ruud Jolie – lead guitar
- Stefan Helleblad – rhythm guitar
- Jeroen van Veen – bass
- Martijn Spierenburg – keyboards
- Mike Coolen – drums

Additional musicians

- Jasper Steverlinck – guest vocals

== Charts ==
Chart (2018–19)	Peak position
Belgium (Ultratip Bubbling Under Flanders)	35
