= The Reckoning (Within Temptation song) =

Single by Within Temptation featuring Jacoby Shaddix

from the album Resist
- Released: 14 September 2018
- Genre: Gothic metal; hard rock; electronic metal
- Length: 4:11
- Label: Vertigo
- Songwriter(s): Sharon den Adel; Robert Westerholt; Daniel Gibson

Within Temptation featuring Jacoby Shaddix singles chronology
"'And We Run'" (2014)	"The Reckoning" (2018)	"'Raise Your Banner'" (2018)

"The Reckoning" is the first single from Dutch symphonic metal band Within Temptation's seventh studio album Resist, and features guest vocals from Jacoby Shaddix of Papa Roach. It was released worldwide via digital download and streaming on 14 September 2018. A promotional lyric video accompanied the release. The official music video for the song was released on September 24. The video was nominated for an Edison Award for Best Video.

== Background ==
After recovering from a burnout, a writer's block and some personal problems during the year of 2017, lead vocalist Sharon den Adel felt able again to write for Within Temptation and entered the studio again. On 14 September 2018, the band announced a new album for a sooner release and revealed "The Reckoning" as the first song and first single of it. The official music video for the song was officially released on 24 September.

The song features Jacoby Shaddix from Papa Roach as a featured vocalist. Den Adel, who already liked his work, first met Shaddix at the 2015 of the Graspop Metal Meeting in Belgium, with whom she engaged in a conversation and felt personally connected. After the song was already completed, he was invited to provide his vocals as the band thought that Shaddix could provide the song a certain anger mixed with some vulnerability and melancholy.

Musically, it differs from some of the band previous works, as it features a combination of more electronic elements and heavier riffs than usual. It features alternative metal influences and contains heavy riffs from an eight-string guitar. Regarding the symphonic elements of the songs, for which the band is mostly known for, the group opted to use only where they found it would have an impact instead of in the whole song, in order to offer a bigger showcase of the other instruments and den Adel's vocals. Lyrically, the song takes inspiration from political contemporary themes such as technology and the dangers of a possible loss of freedom, a subject also not frequently addressed by the band.

On 26 June 2020, an episode of WWE Smackdown used this song in a tribute video to the retiring wrestler The Undertaker, which was then posted on the WWE YouTube account, retrieving over 900,000 views in the first two days.

On 24 May 2024, a live version of the song featuring Amy Lee of Evanescence in the place of Shaddix was released in order to promote the live album Worlds Collide Tour – Live in Amsterdam.

== Music video ==
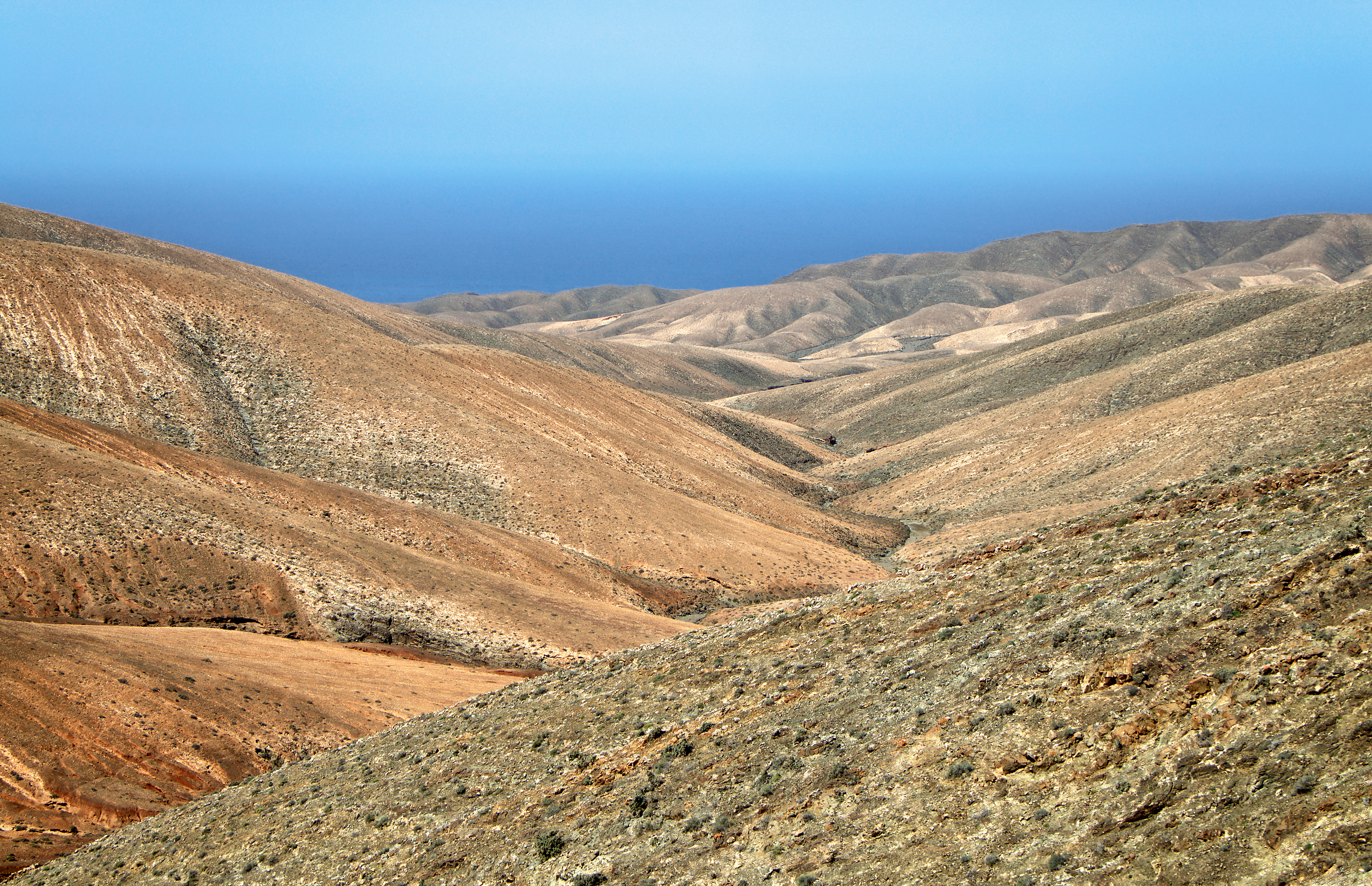
The island of Fuerteventura, in Spain, served as the filming location for the music video.

The official music video for the song was directed by German agency Noise and produced by Timescope production company. It was shot on the island of Fuerteventura, one of the Canary Islands. As the band didn't find radio stations a reliable way for promoting heavy music at the time of the album's release, they opted to invest greatly on the music videos spawned from Resist in order to promote the album and deepen its musical and thematic characteristics. Due to scheduling conflicts, Shaddix, who provided guest vocals for the song, was unable to appear on the video.

The video places the band on a post-apocalyptic dystopian future, where the members are seen walking through a desert-like landscape with white flags and torches. As they reach a spot with a great number of big machine pillars pointed to the sky, the band manages to run through the middle of them, as the machines starts moving and shooting red laser beams at the group. Two members are left behind, as the other three proceed walking through the scenery. As a red light is seen on the sky, a giant spaceship appears. Two members run to different sides, as lead vocalist den Adel is hit with a red light and falls on her knees to the ground. When almost getting abducted, the two remaining members hit their white flags on the ground causing a display of blue energy, which ends up striking the spaceship on both sides. As the spaceship starts to fall to the ground, both men and den Adel stare at its fall and destruction.

== Accolades ==
=== Critics' lists ===
Critic/Publication	List	Rank	Ref.
Loudwire	Best 2019 Metal Songs	Unranked	

=== Awards ===
Year	Organization	Award	Result	Ref.
2019	Edison Award	Edison Award for Best Video	Nominated	

== Track ==
Digital download
No.	Title	Lyrics	Music	Length
1.	"The Reckoning"	Sharon den Adel; Robert Westerholt; Daniel Gibson	den Adel; Westerholt; Gibson	4:11
Total length:				4:11

== Personnel ==
Within Temptation

- Sharon den Adel – lead vocals
- Ruud Jolie – lead guitar
- Stefan Helleblad – rhythm guitar
- Jeroen van Veen – bass
- Martijn Spierenburg – keyboards
- Mike Coolen – drums

Additional musicians

- Jacoby Shaddix – guest vocals

== Charts ==
Chart (2019)	Peak position
Finland Airplay (Radiosoittolista)	85
Germany Alternative (Deutsche Alternative Charts)	12
Hungary (Single Top 40)	25
