= Zuid-Waddinxveen =

Coordinates: 52°02′06″N 4°39′19″E

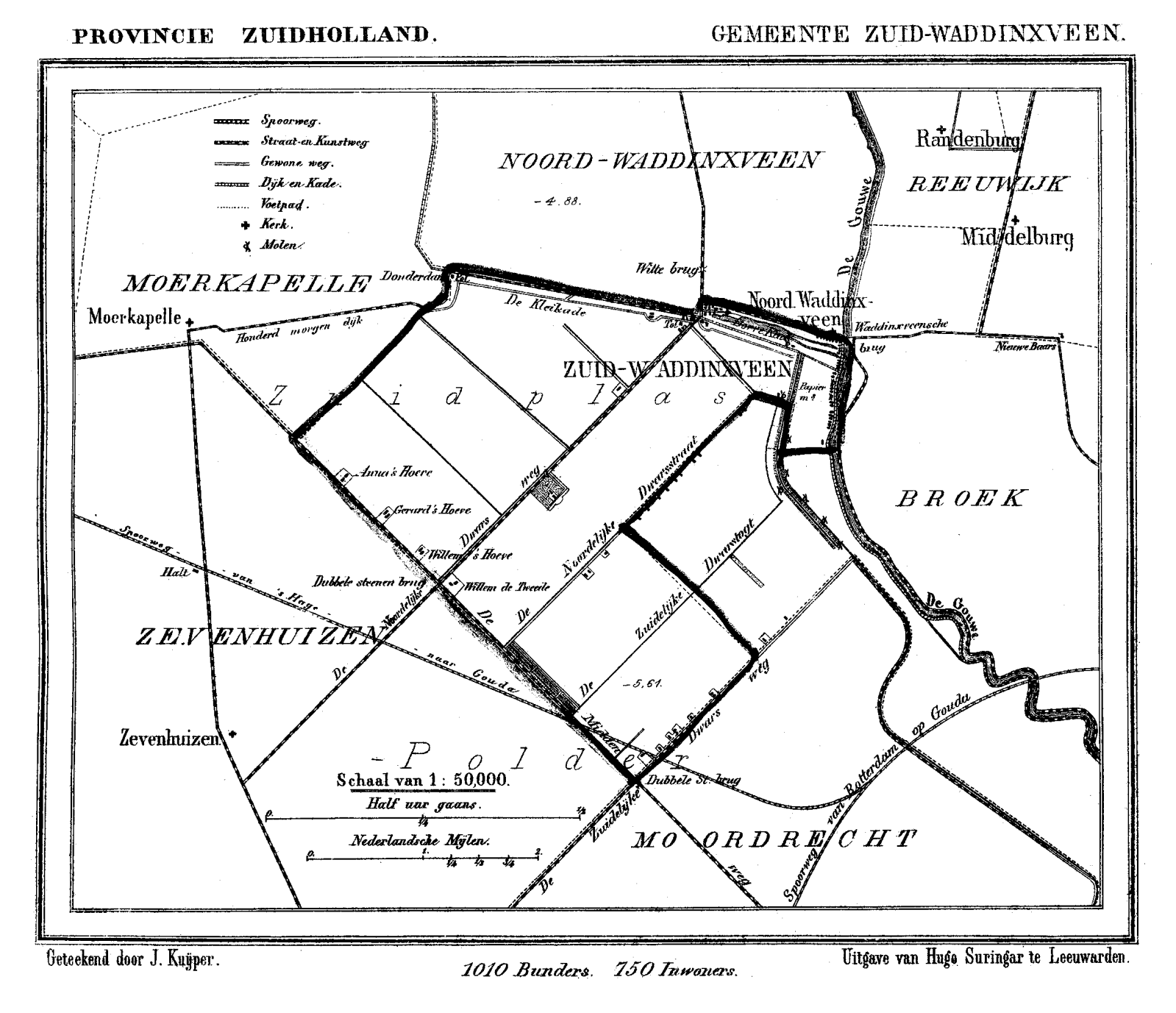

Zuid-Waddinxveen is a former municipality in the Dutch province of South Holland. It covered the southern half of the village Waddinxveen.

The municipality existed between 1817 and 1870, when it merged with Noord-Waddinxveen.
