= My Indigo =

Dutch music project by Sharon den Adel

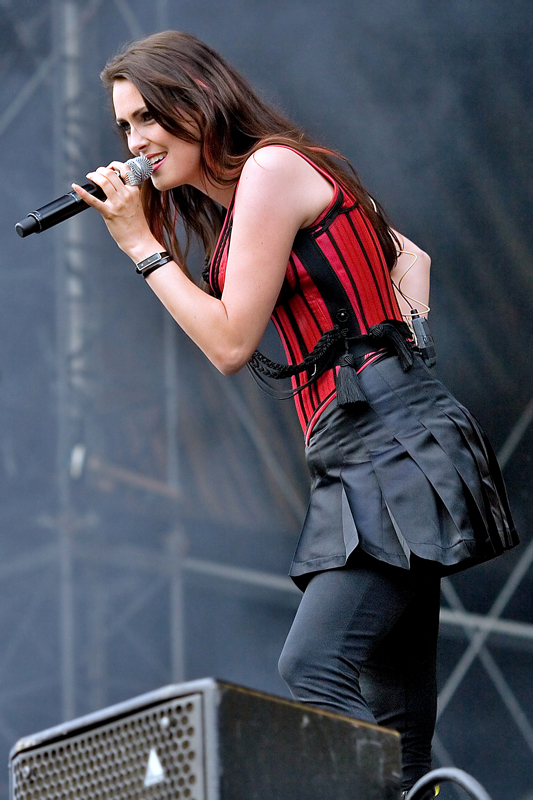
- Sharon den Adel in 2008, while performing with Within Temptation.

Background information
- Origin: Netherlands
- Genre: Pop
- Years active: 2017–present
- Label: BMG
- Members: Sharon den Adel
- Website: www.my-indigo.com

My Indigo is a musical project by Dutch singer and songwriter Sharon den Adel. The project was announced in late 2017.

== History ==
On late 2017 and with no recent news of Sharon den Adel's band Within Temptation activities, the social media of the band itself posted that a new announcement from den Adel was coming soon. On November 10, via a video posted on the band official Facebook page, den Adel announced the creation of the project. According to her, after the band concluded their latest world tour, the singer had a writer's block and was not able to compose new songs with the band. Besides also struggling with personal problems, den Adel decided to write songs for herself in order to better deal with those said problems, in which was later revealed that her father was extremely ill. It was later revealed that her father died from the illness, and the album was dedicated to him.

After a period of two years composing for herself, she then decided to share the material publicly and apart from her band, and entitled the project My Indigo. The process of composing was cited as introspective and soul-searching, as the fear of a permanent creativity loss was recurrent for den Adel during this period. According to the singer, the name of the project came from the "light" but also "moody" feeling that the color provides her, as she considered it has fitted well the main atmosphere of the songs. The first single, also entitled "My Indigo", was released on the same day of the announcement. A second song, entitled "Out of the Darkness", was presented with a live performance during an event of NPO Radio 2 on December 9 and released on December 15.

The first album, that also received the name of My Indigo, was released on April 20, 2018, to positive critical reception. Music critics have found differences between this project and den Adel's work with Within Temptation, as here we find a more "vulnerable" and "introspective" version of the singer, as opposed to the "big" and "epic" compositions that trademark her band's work. Influences from the 80's and contemporary pop were also noted, as the singer herself confirmed being influenced by artists such as Kate Bush, Sting and Florence and the Machine. While working with the project, den Adel stated that new inspiration came for creating new songs with Within Temptation again.

== Discography ==
=== Studio albums ===
- My Indigo (2018)

=== Singles ===
- "My Indigo" (2017)
- "Out of the Darkness" (2017)
- "My Indigo (Chill Mix)" (2018)
- "Crash and Burn" (2018)
- "Crash and Burn (Leeb Remix)" (2018)
- "Someone Like You" (2018)
- "Where Is My Love" (2018)
