= My Indigo (song) =

Single by My Indigo

from the album My Indigo
- Released: 10 November 2017
- Recorded: 2017
- Genre: Pop
- Length: 3:26
- Label: BMG
- Songwriter(s): Sharon den Adel; Daniel Gibson; Will Knox

Music video
- "My Indigo" on YouTube

"My Indigo" is the first single of Dutch singer and songwriter Sharon den Adel musical project My Indigo, announced on 9 November 2017, by den Adel at the Dutch talkshow RTL Late Night . It was officially released on 10 November 2017, via a Facebook announcement.

== Background ==
"My Indigo" is the first single of Within Temptation's lead vocalist Sharon den Adel homonymous solo project. Den Adel stated that the musical approach is different from her band, and was never intended to be musically close to it. The song contains a more upbeat approach than den Adel's main band. According to Loudwire, "the song starts off with more melodic guitar parts, allowing the emotion of the singer's voice to really lead the song, but by the time the chorus kicks in, there are more prominent drums and keyboard parts as den Adel segues from a more vulnerable vibe to something more strong, defiant and powerful." It later entered the Ultratip Bubbling Under charts in Belgium.

The song had its first live presentation at the Dutch radio station NPO Radio 2 on 29 November 2017. At the occasion, den Adel also performed a cover for the song "The Rose", by Bette Midler.

== Track listing ==
No.	Title	Writer(s)	Length
1.	"My Indigo"	Sharon den Adel; Daniel Gibson; William Knox	3:26
