= Sharon den Adel =

Dutch singer (born 1974)

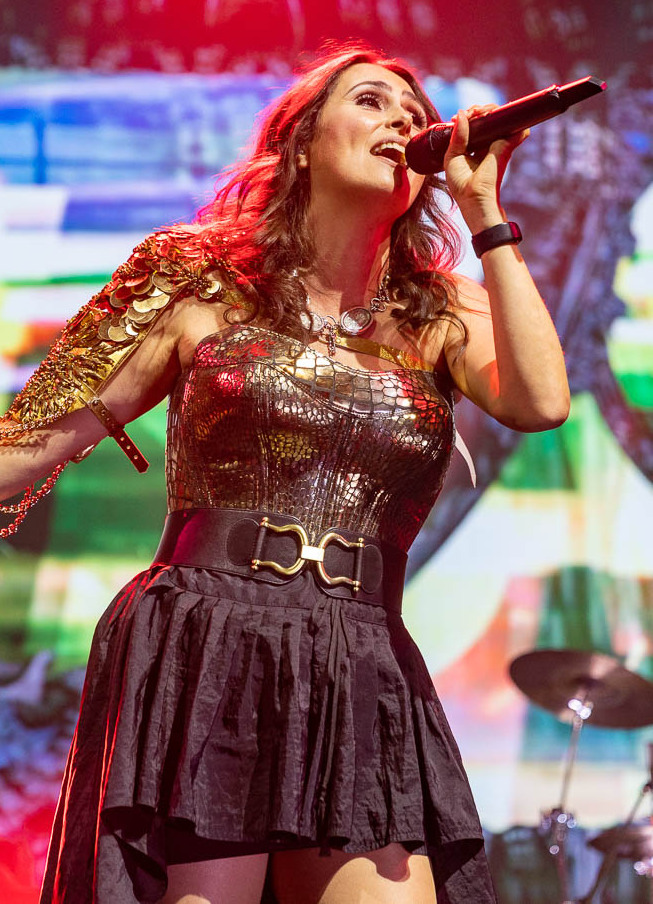
- Den Adel with Within Temptation in 2023

Background information
- Born: Sharon Janny den Adel; 12 July 1974 (age 52); Waddinxveen, South Holland, Netherlands
- Genres: Symphonic metal; gothic metal; pop rock
- Occupations: Singer; songwriter
- Years active: 1996–present
- Member of: Within Temptation; My Indigo
- Spouse: Robert Westerholt (m. 2018)

Sharon Janny den Adel (born 12 July 1974) is a Dutch singer and songwriter who is the lead vocalist of the symphonic metal band Within Temptation. She has been performing since age 14, and co-founded Within Temptation with partner Robert Westerholt in 1996. She was also elected to be the Dutch chairperson of the jury for the Eurovision Song Contest 2018.

== Early life ==
Sharon Janny den Adel was born on 12 July 1974 in Waddinxveen. She lived in Indonesia for five years as a child. The Balinese dancers that she saw during that time inspired her dance movements on stage. After returning from Suriname to the Netherlands, she was bullied by classmates because of her different clothing style, hairstyle, and darkened skin. From the age of 14, she performed with various bands, including a blues rock band called Kashiro. As their partnership grew, in 1996 they came to form a band called The Portal, though the name was changed to Within Temptation before their debut recording. Den Adel has a bachelor's degree in fashion design.

== Career ==
=== Training and voice ===
Sharon never formally studied singing and stated in a 2006 interview that she had sung a short while in a choir and was mostly self-taught. She used to practice alone three or four hours per day. She has been described as possessing a mezzo-soprano voice.

=== Influences ===
den Adel grew up in a household with broad musical tastes; her parents listened to artists and bands including Pink Floyd, Queen, Santana, The Eagles, Deep Purple, ELO, Black Sabbath, and Kate Bush. As a young child she was particularly drawn to Olivia Newton-John after seeing the film Grease (1979), and she has repeatedly cited Newton-John’s voice and presence as her earliest major inspiration for singing. She also discovered the Moody Blues, notably Days of Future Passed and the song "Nights in White Satin" and later Janis Joplin, especially Big Brother and the Holding Company's “Piece of My Heart in her pre-teen years.

In her mid-to-late teens den Adel discovered Nirvana, particularly the album Nevermind (1991), which became her first deep passion for heavier music and opened the door to other grunge acts such as Alice in Chains and Pearl Jam; she has described the band as her favourite, praising the raw emotional intensity of their live recordings, notably From the Muddy Banks of the Wishkah) even though her parents would not allow her to attend a planned Amsterdam show. Around the same period she encountered Tori Amos’s Little Earthquakes (1992), whose poetic, intensely personal lyrics and piano-driven stage presence made a lasting impression and further shaped her approach to songwriting and emotional expression.

With Within Temptation, den Adel and bandmate Robert Westerholt have frequently pointed to Paradise Lost’s Gothic (1991) as a pivotal influence for combining growling vocals, heavy doom and gothic elements, and operatic or clean female singing. Additional key references for the band’s early and developing sound include Marillion, Clannad and Dead Can Dance and broader death-metal extremes that Westerholt favored. Later albums drew on 1980s metal and rock as well as production ideas from Linkin Park. Den Adel’s solo project My Indigo reflected more intimate influences such as Kate Bush, Fleetwood Mac, and Sting. Her other influences include Arid, Heather Nova, Type O Negative, Dolly Parton, Bjork, Alanis Morissette, Iron Maiden, A Perfect Circle, Queensrÿche, The Verve, Orphanage, Black Sabbath, Annie Lennox, Enigma, Metallica, HIM, Florence and the Machine, Mariah Carey, Bob Marley, and Sinéad O’Connor.

=== Within Temptation ===
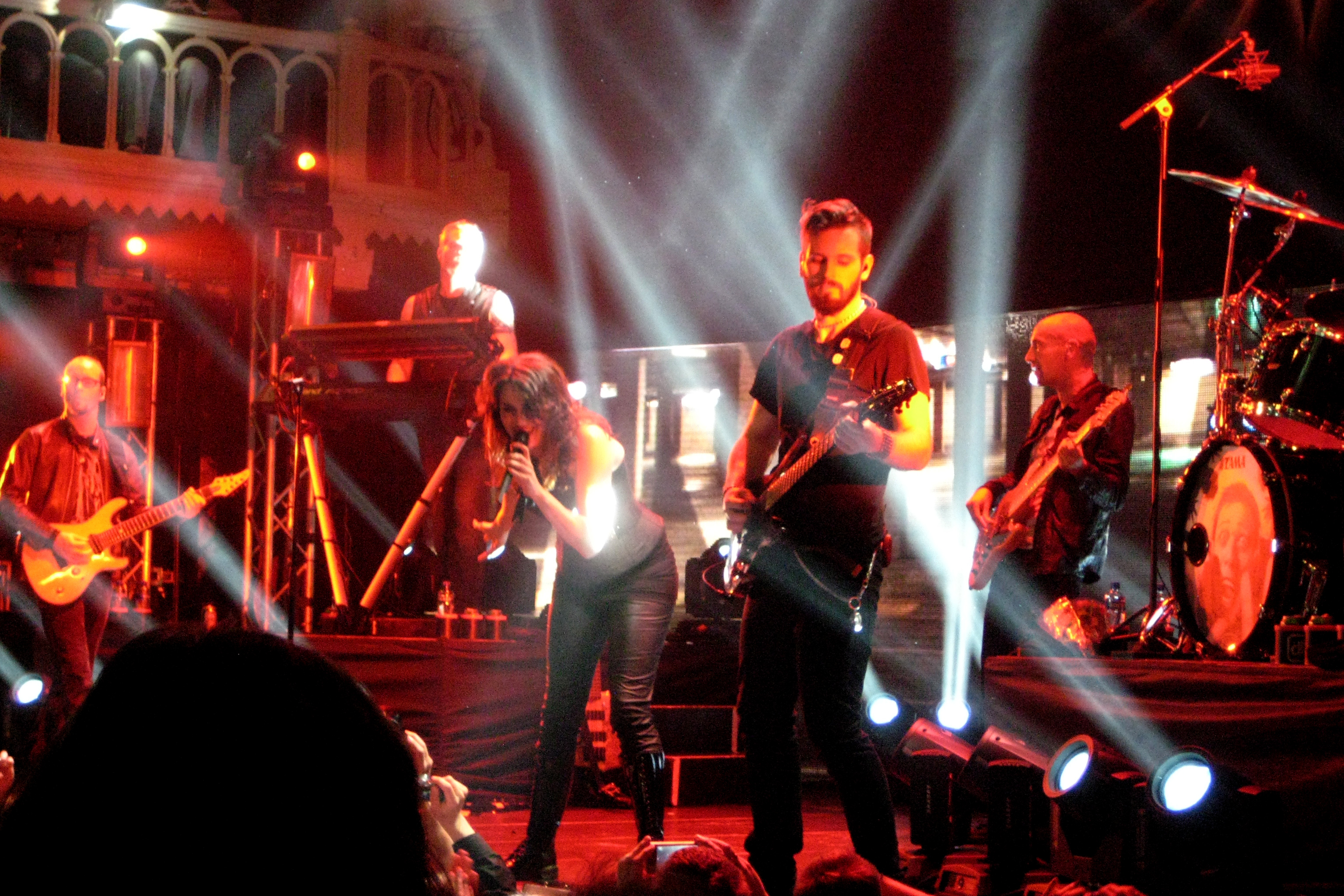
Den Adel performing with Within Temptation in 2011

Robert Westerholt and den Adel formed Within Temptation (initially called The Portal, though the name was changed before their first recording) in 1996. Westerholt had introduced den Adel to his music when he performed with the band The Circle, which was sonically similar to the music that Within Temptation would make. She has defined their work as epic and cinematic. Her vocals play a major role in the band's sound, despite having never received formal vocal training.

Before Within Temptation became famous, she worked for a fashion company, leaving after the band found success with their hit single "Ice Queen". She utilizes her fashion expertise by designing her stage costumes and the band's merchandise. About.com described den Adel as a "versatile and skilled singer who is equally adept at singing powerfully with a full orchestra and choir as she is at singing quietly and emotionally with just a piano." When asked if she prefers to sing in Dutch or English, den Adel said that she favors the latter because "Dutch just doesn't fit to our music style. It is also not the nicest language to sing in. Italian or Spanish would then be better options."

The band were invited several times to compete at the Eurovision Song Contest as the Dutch representatives, but they have declined every time since they find it not the best place for a metal band to present themselves. In 2018, den Adel was then selected as a juror for that year's edition.

=== My Indigo ===
On 9 November 2017, den Adel announced on the Dutch TV-show RTL Late Night, that on the following day 10 November 2017, the first single for her solo project My Indigo, also entitled "My Indigo", would be released. According to den Adel, the project was originally not intended to be released to the general public as it was for her a form to deal with personal problems, and also due to a writer's block for composing for Within Temptation. After two years composing for herself and with regained inspiration to write for Within Temptation, den Adel decided to share the project publicly as a separate project named "My Indigo". The self titled first album was released on 20 April 2018.

=== Collaborations with other artists ===
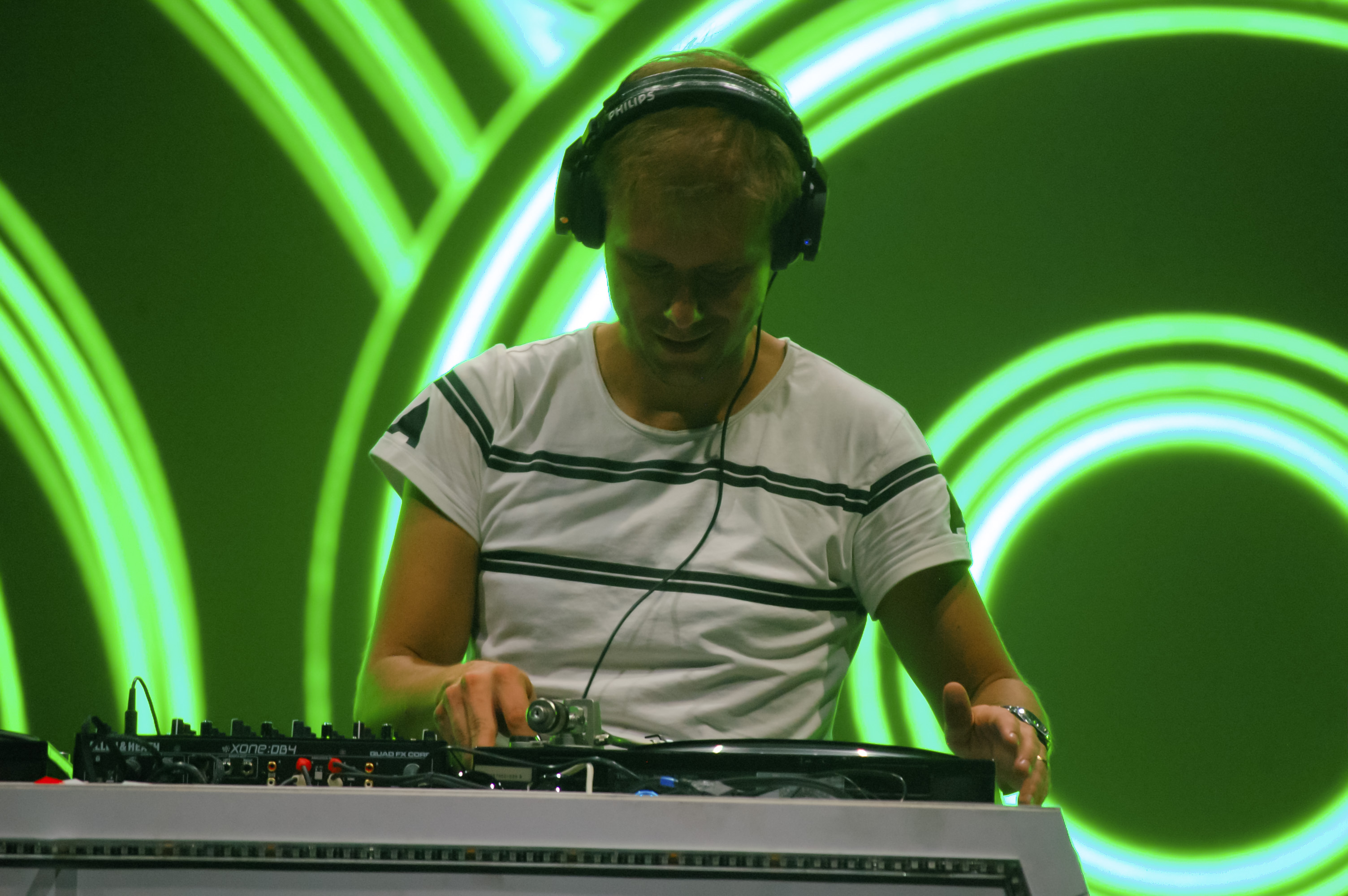
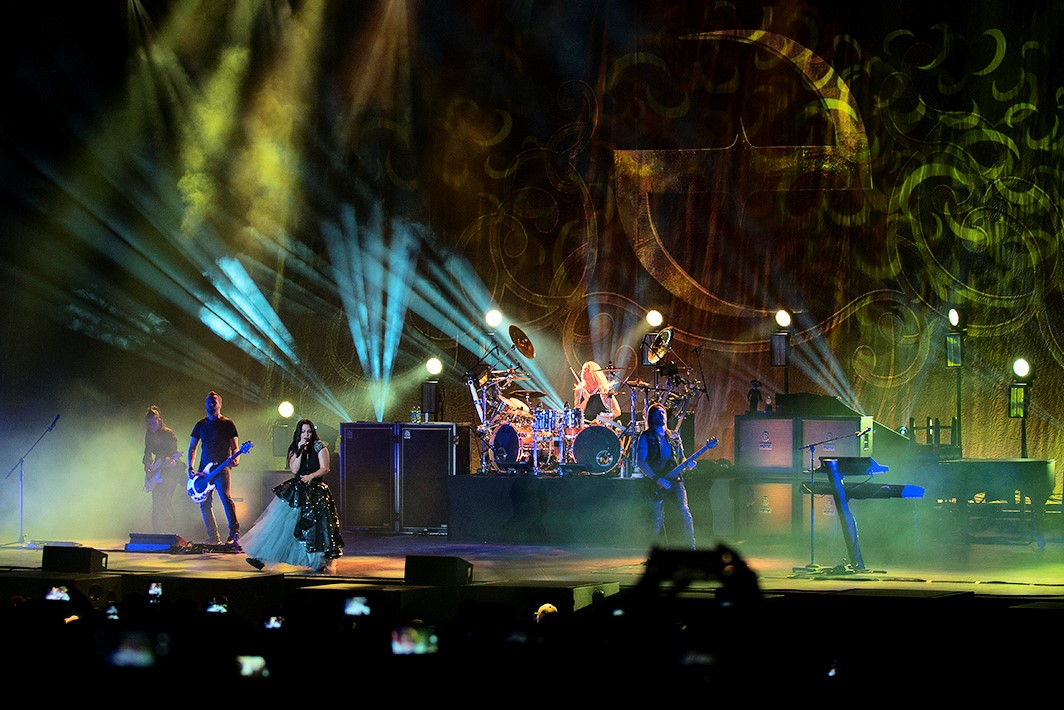
Den Adel has collaborated on stage and in studio with artists from different genres, such as Dutch DJ Armin van Buuren (above) and American rock band Evanescence (below).

Besides her main work on Within Temptation, den Adel has performed on-stage and in the studio with several notable artists from varied musical genres, including Tarja Turunen, Armin van Buuren, After Forever, De Heideroosjes, Oomph!, Delain, Agua de Annique, Anneke van Giersbergen and Evanescence. Before forming Within Temptation, den Adel worked together with Voyage, formed by some of the future Within Temptation members, on the track "Frozen" (not to be confused with the Within Temptation song of the same title).

The vocalist took part in several rock and metal opera projects, singing the part of Anna Held in two of Tobias Sammet's Avantasia releases, The Metal Opera and The Metal Opera Part II, later also singing the part of the "Muse" in the 2016 album Ghostlights. She also took the part of the "Indian" on Ayreon's rock opera Into the Electric Castle. Den Adel then collaborated on two of Timo Tolkki's projects, being a guest vocalist on Timo Tolkki's Avalon track "Shine", for the work The Land of New Hope, and was featured in his solo project track "Are You the One?".

Within the symphonic metal scene, den Adel collaborated with After Forever on the track "Beyond Me", released on the album Prison of Desire, performing the song live with the band at selected concerts. She was part of a duet with Marko Hietala on the track "No Compliance" for Delain's album Lucidity, also joining the band on selected live performances of the song. Den Adel was one of the guest vocalists invited for Tarja Turunen's rendition of Feliz Navidad, which featured an ensemble of names from the heavy metal scene and was released as a benefit single.

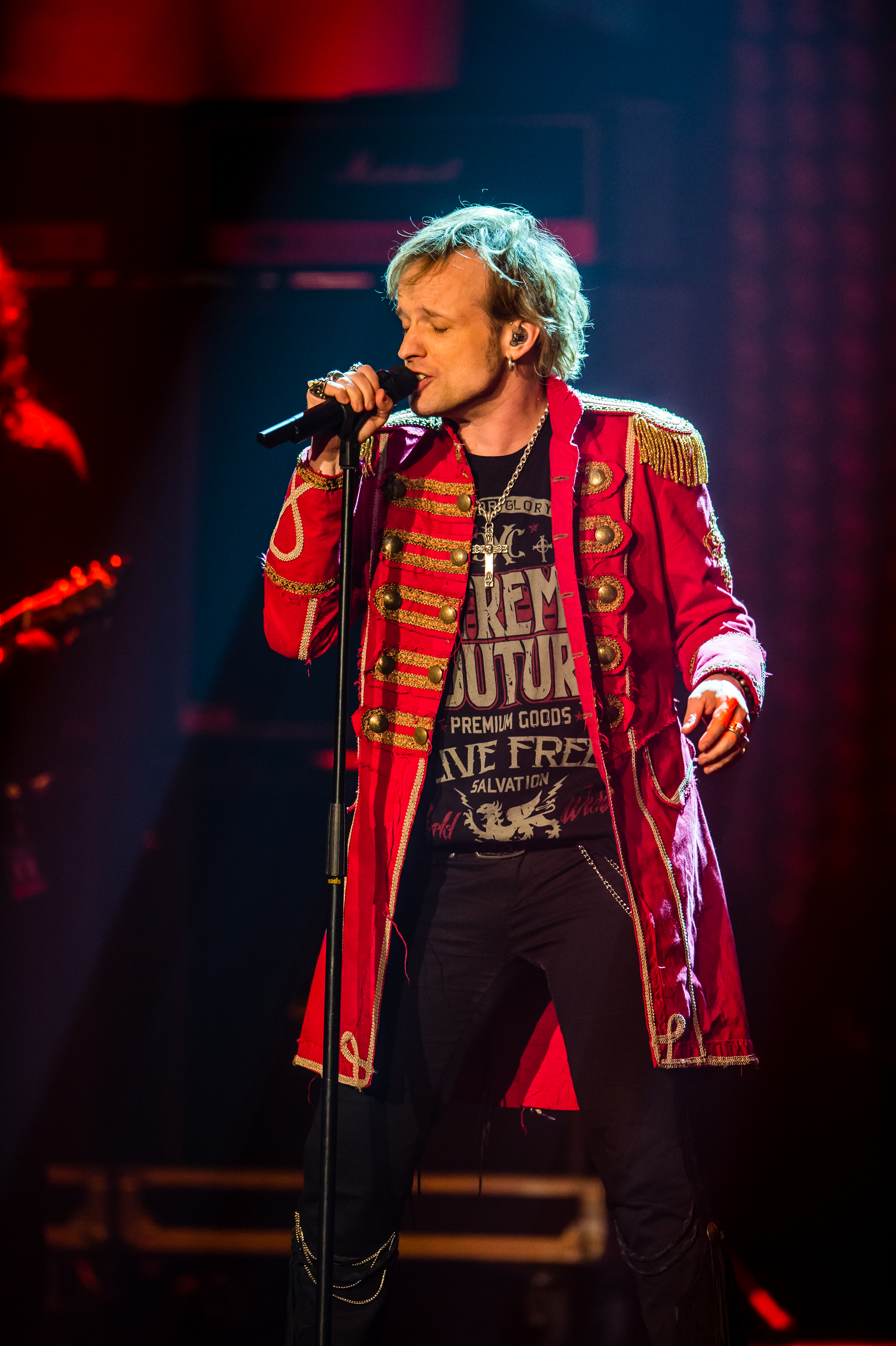
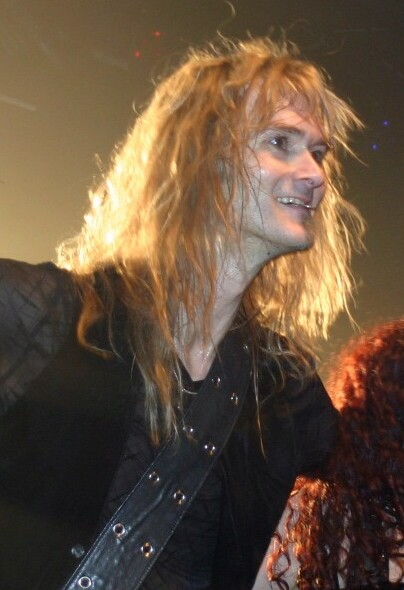
Within the metal scene, den Adel appeared in rock opera projects such as Tobias Sammet's Avantasia (left) and Arjen Anthony Lucassen's Ayreon (right).

Also venturing on other musical genres, den Adel co-wrote and recorded the vocals for the track "In and Out of Love" on Armin van Buuren's 2008 trance album Imagine, which earned them awards for "Best Progressive House/Trance Track" and "Best video" on the International Dance Music Awards. They performed a special version of the song alongside the Metropole Orchestra at the 2010 edition of the Golden Harp gala ceremony, where van Buuren was awarded for his musical work. At the 2009 edition of the Night of the Proms, den Adel made a guest appearance during John Miles' performance of "Stairway to Heaven". At the end of 2012, den Adel made an appearance on a charity campaign made by a Belgian radio station to raise money for children singing the chorus of the song het Meneer Konijn lied among other Belgian celebrities. The song later topped the Belgian charts. In 2014, den Adel collaborated with Dutch rapper Ali B on the track "Hier".

In 2020, Sharon was asked by American metal band Evanescence to collaborate with them for their single "Use My Voice". Along with lead singer Amy Lee, other musicians joined in on the song such as rock vocalists Lzzy Hale, Taylor Momsen, Deena Jakoub and many more as well as Lindsey Stirling. During the co-headlining Worlds Collide tour, den Adel joined the band on stage to perform the song at selected dates.

== Personal life ==
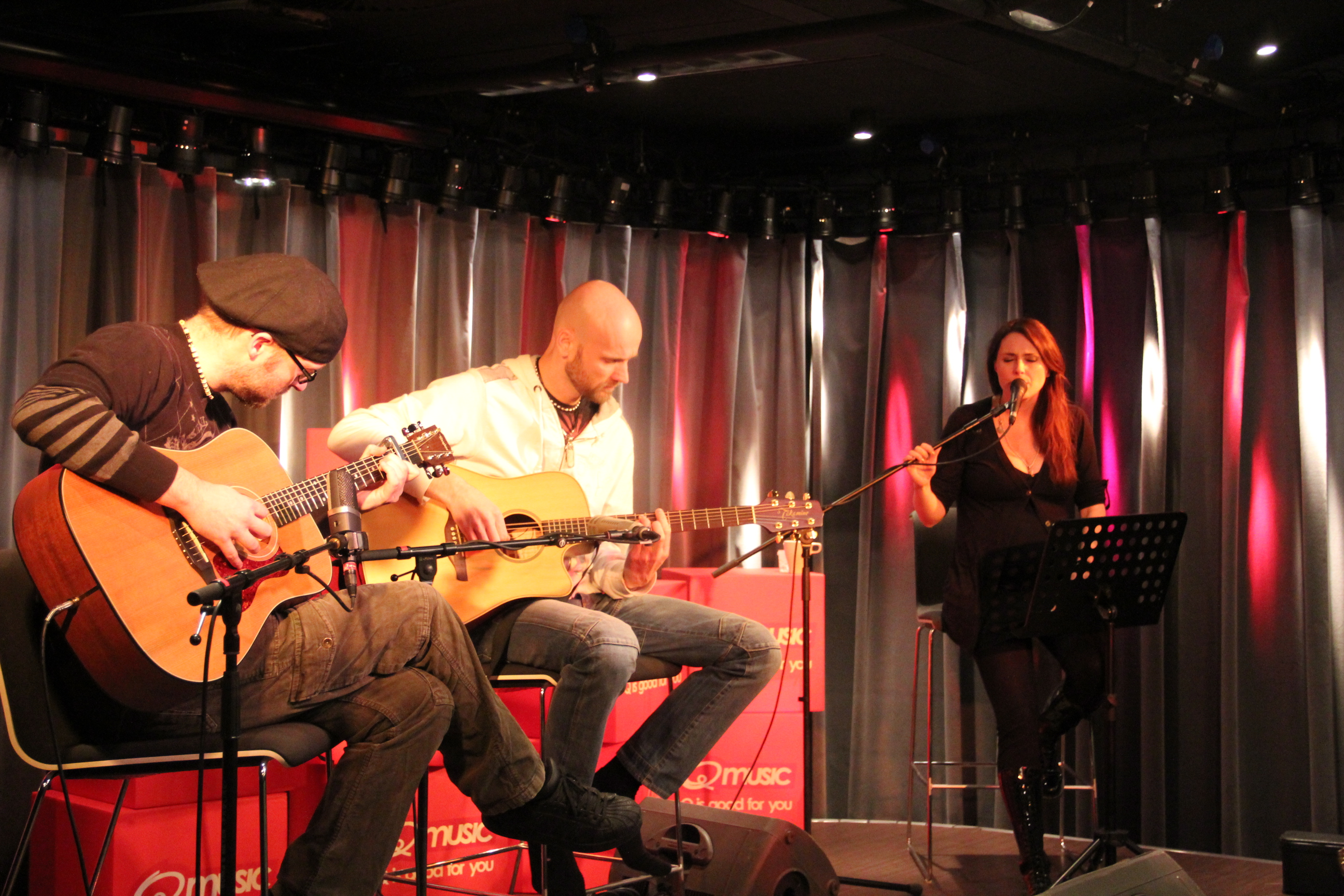
Den Adel and Westerholt (center) doing an acoustic performance at the Q-Music studios

Den Adel and long-term partner and bandmate Robert Westerholt have three children together. Their first child was born in December 2005. In February 2009, Den Adel announced that she was pregnant with her second child, who was born in June 2009. In November 2010, she announced that she was expecting her third child, whose birth was announced in March 2011. Den Adel and Westerholt eventually married in 2018.

== Discography ==
=== Guest appearances ===
Year	Title	Main or other artist(s)	Album
1996	"Frozen"	Voyage	Embrace
1997	"Hear"	Silicon Head	Bash
1998	"Isis & Osiris"	Ayreon	Into the Electric Castle
1998	"Amazing Flight"	Ayreon	Into the Electric Castle
1998	"The Decision Tree"	Ayreon	Into the Electric Castle
1998	"Tunnel of Light"	Ayreon	Into the Electric Castle
1998	"The Garden of Emotions"	Ayreon	Into the Electric Castle
1998	"Cosmic Fusion"	Ayreon	Into the Electric Castle
1998	"Another Time, Another Space"	Ayreon	Into the Electric Castle
1999	"Regular Day in Bosnia"	De Heideroosjes	Schizo
2000	"Beyond Me"	After Forever	Prison of Desire
2000	"Farewell"	Avantasia	The Metal Opera; The Metal Opera: Pt 1 & 2 – Gold Edition^{[A]}
2000	"Behold"	Orphanage	Inside
2000	"Fly"	Paralysis	Architecture of the Imagination
2000	"Architecture of the Imagination"	Paralysis	Architecture of the Imagination
2001	"Last Call to Humanity"	De Heideroosjes	Fast Forward
2002	"Time"	Aemen	Fooly Dressed
2002	"Waltz"	Aemen	Fooly Dressed
2002	"Into the Unknown"	Avantasia	The Metal Opera Part II; The Metal Opera: Pt 1 & 2 – Gold Edition^{[A]}
2002	"Are You the One?"	Timo Tolkki	Hymn to Life
2005	"Candy"	De Heideroosjes	—N/a^{[B]}
2006	"No Compliance"	Delain (also featuring Marko Hietala)	Lucidity
2008	"In and Out of Love"	Armin van Buuren	Imagine
2009	"Somewhere"^{[C]}	Agua de Annique	Pure Air
2009	"Stupid"	Chris Jones	—N/a
2009	"Stairway to Heaven"	John Miles, Katona Twins	—N/a^{[D]}
2010	"Land Ahead"	Oomph!	Truth Or Dare
2011	"Keep Breathing"	Ruud Jolie	For All We Know
2012	"Nostradamus"	Coeverduh	Wesley Against Society
2012	"Between Two Worlds And I"	Leander Rising	Heart Tamer
2012	"Het Meneer Konijn Lied"	Various artists	De Vrienden Van Meneer Konijn
2013	"Shine"	Avalon	The Land of New Hope
2013	"No Compliance"	Delain	—N/a^{[E]}
2013	"Restless"	Delain	—N/a^{[E]}
2014	"Hier"	Ali B	Ali B en de Muziekkaravaan
2016	"Isle of Evermore"	Avantasia	Ghostlights
2016	"Paradise (What About Us?)" (new mix)	Tarja Turunen	The Brightest Void
2017	"Feliz Navidad"	Tarja Turunen	Feliz Navidad
2019	"Sirens"	Saint Asonia	Flawed Design
2020	"Use My Voice"	Evanescence	The Bitter Truth
2022	"Faded Out"	Asking Alexandria	The Retaliators (Music from the Motion Picture) and See What's on the Inside (Deluxe edition)

- A Special edition later released.
- B Special appearance at the Pinkpop Festival.
- C Cover of the Within Temptation song, from The Silent Force.
- D Special rendition of the song for the 2009 Night of the Proms in the Netherlands.
- E Special appearance at the Metal Female Voices Fest.

=== Other songs ===
Year	Title	Album
2018	"Just What I Need Tonight"	Liefde Voor Muziek (Live)
2018	"Virgin State Of Mind"	Liefde Voor Muziek (Live)
2018	"Things That I Should Have Done"	Liefde Voor Muziek (Live)

== Videography ==
=== Guest appearances ===
- Time with Aemen (2003)
- In and Out of Love with Armin van Buuren (2008)
- We Are the Others with Delain (2012)
- Hier with Ali B (2014)
- Faded Out with Asking Alexandria (2022)
- Light Can Only Shine in the Darkness with Lord of the Lost (2025)

== Filmography ==
- Karo wil goed dood (2023)

== Awards ==
Awards
Year	Award	Category	Nominated Work	Result
2009	International Dance Music Awards	Best Progressive House/Trance Track	In and Out of Love (Armin van Buuren feat. Sharon den Adel)	Won
2009	International Dance Music Awards	Best video	In and Out of Love (Armin van Buuren feat. Sharon den Adel)	Won
2011	Loudwire Music Awards	Rock Goddess of the Year	Sharon den Adel	Won
2014	Loudwire Music Awards	Rock Goddess of the Year	Sharon den Adel	Won
