= Pretty Maids discography =

Metal band discography

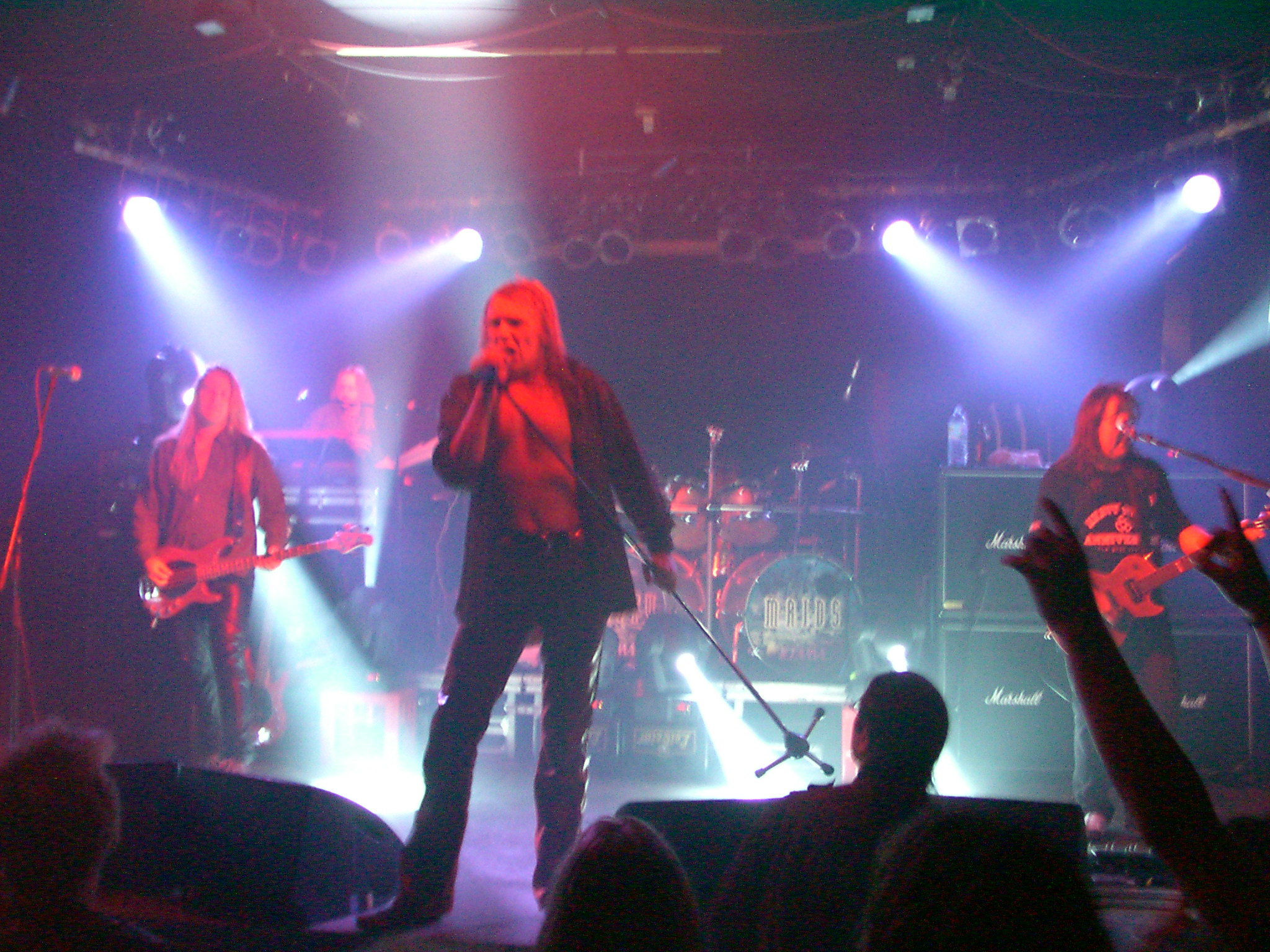
- Studio albums: 16
- EPs: 4
- Live albums: 4
- Compilation albums: 4

The discography of Danish hard rock/heavy metal band Pretty Maids consists of sixteen studio albums, four live albums, four extended plays and four compilation albums. Formed in Horsens in 1981, the band released their debut extended play, Pretty Maids, in 1983, followed by their first studio album, Red, Hot and Heavy, in 1984.

The band's most commercially successful releases include Future World (1987), Jump the Gun (1990) and Motherland (2013). Their albums have appeared on national charts in several European countries, including Denmark, Germany, Sweden and Switzerland, as well as in Japan. Their most recent studio album, Undress Your Madness, was released in 2019.

== Albums ==
=== Studio albums ===
Title	Album details	Peak chart positions					
Title	Album details	DEN	BEL	GER	SWE	SWI	US
Red Hot and Heavy	Released:29 October 1984; Label: CBS; Format: LP, CD	—	—	—	—	—	—
Future World	Released: 20 April 1987; Label: CBS; Format: LP, CD, cassette	—	—	57	22	—	165
Jump the Gun^{[a]}	Released: 20 April 1990; Label: CBS; Format: LP, CD	—	—	35	39	20	—
Sin-Decade	Released: 21 February 1992; Label: Columbia; Format: LP, CD	—	—	62	50	—	—
Stripped	Released: 6 September 1993; Label: Columbia; Format: LP, CD	—	—	85	—	—	—
Scream	Released: 13 October 1994; Label: Epic; Format: LP, CD	27	—	92	—	—	—
Spooked	Released: 24 November 1997; Label: Massacre; Format: CD	—	—	74	—	—	—
Anything Worth Doing Is Worth Overdoing	Released: 27 February 1999; Label: Massacre; Format: CD	—	—	71	—	—	—
Carpe Diem	Released: 29 November 2000; Label: Scandinavian; Format: CD	—	—	—	—	—	—
Planet Panic	Released: 15 April 2002; Label: Scandinavian; Format: CD	38	—	—	—	—	—
Wake Up to the Real World	Released: 12 December 2006; Label: Frontiers; Format: CD, digital download	—	—	—	—	—	—
Pandemonium	Released: 14 May 2010; Label: Frontiers; Format: LP, CD, digital download	14	—	83	45	63	—
Motherland	Released: 22 March 2013; Label: Frontiers; Format: LP, CD, digital download	13	115	71	22	29	—
Louder Than Ever	Released: 21 March 2014; Label: Frontiers; Format: CD/DVD, digital download	11	—	59	—	52	—
Kingmaker	Released: 4 November 2016; Label: Frontiers; Format: LP, CD, digital download	—	99	35	36	31	—
Undress Your Madness	Released: 8 November 2019; Label: Frontiers; Format: LP, CD, digital download	—	131	36	31	13	—
"—" denotes items which were not released in that country or failed to chart.

Notes

- ^{^[a]} Released as Lethal Heroes in the United States and Japan.

=== Live albums ===
Title	Album details	Peak chart positions					
Title	Album details	DEN	BEL	GER	SWE	SWI	US
Screamin' Live	Released: 16 November 1995; Label: Epic Records|Epic; Format: LP, CD	—	—	—	—	—	—
Alive At Least - Europe And Japan 2001-2002	Released: 2002; Label: Scandinavian; Format: CD	—	—	—	—	—	—
It Comes Alive - Maid in Switzerland	Released: 23 March 2012; Label: Frontiers; Format: CD/DVD	23	—	81	46	37	—
Maid in Japan – Future World Live 30 Anniversary	Released: 22 May 2020; Label: Frontiers; Format: CD, digital download	—	—	31	—	27	—
"—" denotes items which were not released in that country or failed to chart

=== Extended plays ===
Title	Album details
Pretty Maids	Released: 1983; Label: Bullet; Format: LP, CD
In Santa's Claws - 5 Track Christmas EP	Released: 13 December 1990; Label: CBS; Format: LP, CD
Offside	Released: 23 September 1992; Label: Columbia; Format: CD
Massacre's Classix Shape Edition	Released: 1999; Label: Massacre; Format: CD

=== Compilation albums ===
Title	Album details
The Best Of... Back to Back	Released: 1998; Label: Scandinavian; Format: CD
First Cuts ...And Then Some	Released: 1999; Label: Scandinavian; Format: CD
Original Album Classics	Released: 20 March 2015; Label: Legacy, Epic; Format: CD
A Blast from the Past	Released: 21 February 2019; Label: Frontiers; Format: CD box set, digital download
