= List of Pretty Maids band members =

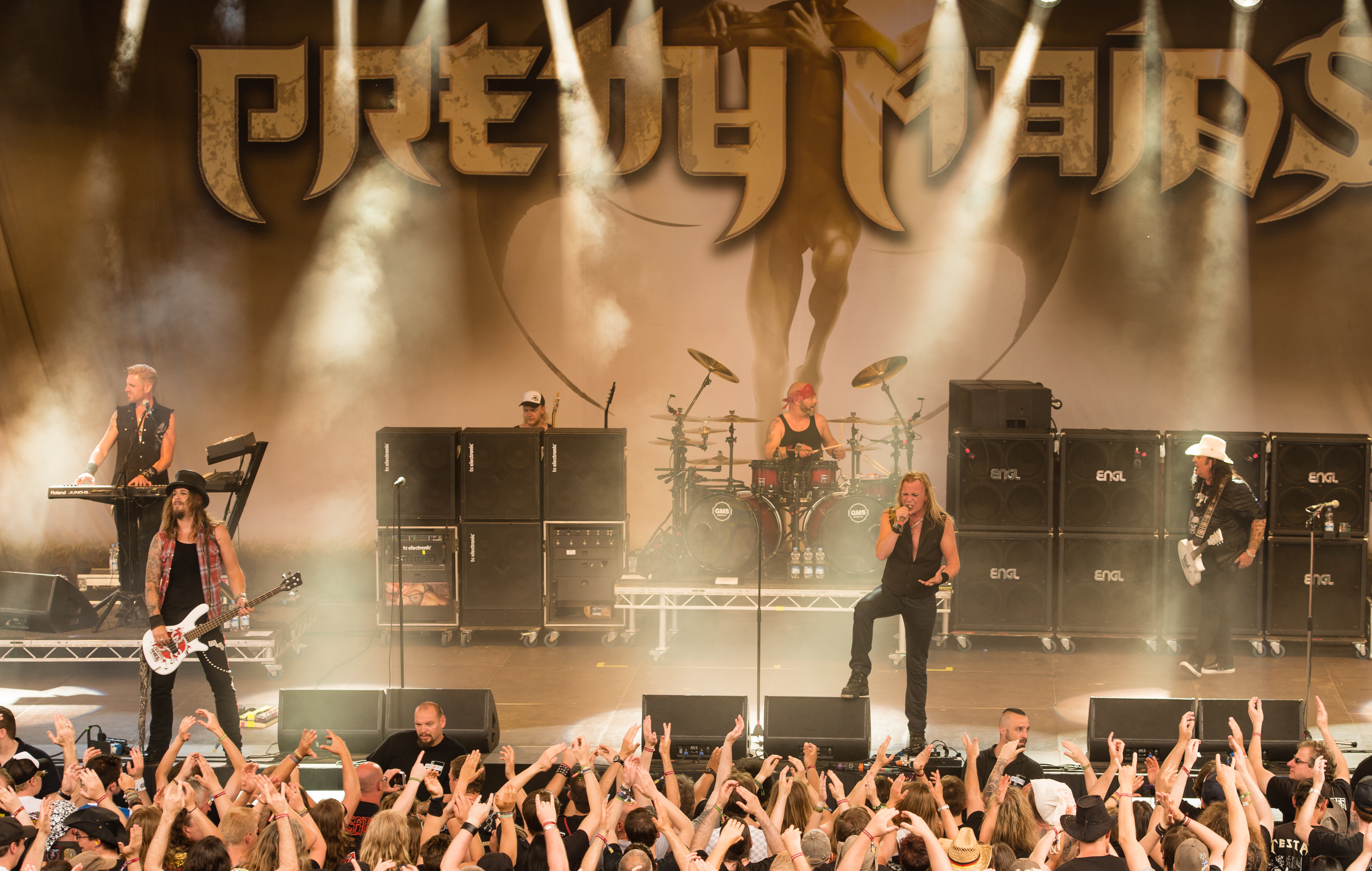
Pretty Maids performing live in 2014.

Pretty Maids is a Danish heavy metal band from Horsens. Formed in late 1981, the group's original full lineup featured vocalist Ronnie Atkins, guitarists Ken Hammer and Pete Collins, bassist John Darrow, drummer Phil Moorheed and keyboardist Alan Owen. The group currently includes Atkins and Hammer, alongside drummer Allan Tschicaja (from 2006 to 2017, and since 2020), bassist Rene Shades (since 2011), and keyboardist/guitarist Chris Laney (since 2016).

== History ==
Pretty Maids was formed during 1981 by guitarist Ken Hammer, who initially worked with vocalist and bassist John Jakobsen. By the "latter part" of the year, Hammer had relaunched the band with new members Ronnie Atkins on vocals, Pete Collins on second guitar, John Darrow on bass, Phil Moorheed on drums, and Alan Owen on keyboards. This lineup recorded and released the band's first demo, Heavy Metal, and a self-titled EP, both in 1983. In April 1984, Collins left and Darrow was sacked, with the pair replaced not long after by Rick Hanson and Allan Delong, respectively. The new lineup released the group's full-length debut Red Hot and Heavy, before Hanson was dismissed as he was "more into melodic/pop metal, which was not good for the band", according to Hammer. Hanson was replaced by Benny Petersen for a short tour of Denmark in October 1984, before Collins returned before the end of the year. By the time Pretty Maids started work on their second album in early 1986, Collins had left again.

After releasing their second album Future World in April 1987, Pretty Maids added former Sinner band Gerhart "Angel" Schleifer as a replacement for Pete Collins. He remained until the end of the album's initial touring cycle in early 1988, when he left to join German group Bonfire, with his place in Pretty Maids taken by Ricky Marx. During the mixing of the band's third album Jump the Gun in September 1989, Owen chose to leave, as "he didn't feel comfortable with the stylistic and visual part of being in a band", according to Atkins; he was replaced by Dominic Gale on a session and touring basis. Jump the Gun was eventually released in April 1990, followed that November by the Christmas EP In Santa's Claws; after a short tour running into December, Marx, Delong and Moorheed all left Pretty Maids.

In early 1991, Atkins and Hammer rebuilt Pretty Maids with the additions of Kenn Jackson on bass and Michael Fast Petersen on drums. This four-piece lineup remained constant throughout the 1990s, releasing a string of albums including their first live release, Screamin' Live. Gale and Owen provided session keyboards during this period. Jan Møller took over touring duties from Gale after the release of Spooked in 1997. In early 2001, the band toured with Jørgen Thorup on keyboards, before Møller returned later that year. After a couple of inactive years, Pretty Maids played a pair of shows in the summer of 2004 with Jacob Troutner on keyboards and Rene Shades on second guitar. Following delays to the recording of the band's next album, Petersen left Pretty Maids in July 2005. He was replaced the following April by Allan Tschicaja, who debuted on Wake Up to the Real World later that year. H. C. Shröder performed keyboards on the album and at two shows in Denmark in December 2006.

By mid-2007, Morten Sandager had taken over as Pretty Maids' touring keyboardist. He became a full-time member with the release of the band's next album Pandemonium in 2010. This was also the last Pretty Maids album to feature bassist Jackson, who left in April 2010. He was briefly replaced by former King Diamond bassist Hal Patino, who left after less than a year. He was replaced by Rene Shades, who was initially introduced as a "temporary" addition. This lineup released It Comes Alive: Maid in Switzerland, Motherland and Louder Than Ever, before parting ways with Sandager in February 2016. Kim Olesen played keyboards on Kingmaker that summer, before Chris Laney took over from September. In May 2017, Tschicaja was replaced by Allan Sørensen from Royal Hunt. After recording the album Undress Your Madness, Sørensen left again in July 2019, with Tschicaja returning to take his place in the band.

== Official members ==
=== Current ===
Image	Name (real name)	Years active	Instruments	Release contributions
	Ken Hammer (Kenneth Hansen)	1981–present	lead guitar; backing vocals	all Pretty Maids releases
	Ronnie Atkins (Paul Christensen)	1981–present	lead vocals	all Pretty Maids releases
	Rene Shades (René Sehic)	2004 (touring); 2011–present	bass; backing vocals; rhythm guitar (2004)	all Pretty Maids releases from It Comes Alive: Maid in Switzerland (2012) onwards
	Allan Tschicaja	2006–2017; 2019–present	drums	all Pretty Maids releases from Wake Up to the Real World (2006) to Kingmaker (2016)
	Chris Laney	2016–present	keyboards; rhythm guitar	Undress Your Madness (2019); Maid in Japan (2020)

=== Former ===
Image	Name (real name)	Years active	Instruments	Release contributions
	John Jakobsen (died 2023)	1981	lead vocals; bass	none
	Phil Moorhead (Henrik Andersen)	1981–1990	drums	all Pretty Maids releases from the Heavy Metal demo (1983) to In Santa's Claws (1990)
	Alan "Stevie" Owen (Allan Nielsen)	1981–1989 (official member); 1996–2002 (session only)	keyboards	all Pretty Maids releases from the Heavy Metal demo (1983) to Sin-Decade (1992), and from Spooked (1997) to Planet Panic (2002); Scream (1994)
	Pete Collins (Jan Sørensen)	1981–1984; 1984–1986	rhythm and lead guitars	Heavy Metal demo (1983); Pretty Maids EP (1983)
	John Darrow (Johnny Møller)	1981–1984	bass; backing vocals	Heavy Metal demo (1983); Pretty Maids EP (1983)
	Allan Delong (Allan Jensen)	1984–1990	bass	Red Hot and Heavy (1984); Future World (1987); Jump the Gun (1990); In Santa's Claws (1990)
	Rick Hanson (Kim Hansen)	1984	rhythm and lead guitars	Red Hot and Heavy (1984)
	Benny Petersen	1984	rhythm and lead guitars	none
	Gerhard "Angel" Schleifer	1987–1988	rhythm and lead guitars	none
	Ricky Marx (Henrik Mark)	1988–1990	rhythm and lead guitars	Jump the Gun (1990); In Santa's Claws (1990)
	Kenn Jackson (Kenn Jacobsen)	1991–2010	bass; backing vocals	all Pretty Maids releases from Sin-Decade (1992) to Pandemonium (2010)
	Michael Fast Petersen	1991–2005	drums; percussion; backing vocals	all Pretty Maids releases from Sin-Decade (1992) to Alive at Least (2002)
	Morten Sandager	2007–2016	keyboards	Pandemonium (2010); It Comes Alive: Maid in Switzerland (2012); Motherland (2013); Louder Than Ever (2014)
	Hal Patino	2010–2011	bass	none
	Allan Sørensen	2017–2019	drums	Undress Your Madness (2019); Maid in Japan (2020)

== Backup musicians ==
Image	Name	Years active	Instruments	Details
	Dominic Gale (session and touring member)	1989–1996	keyboards	After Alan Owen's departure, Gale took over keyboard duties as a session and touring member, featuring on all releases from In Santa's Claws (1990) to Screamin' Live (1995).
	Jan Møller (touring member)	1997–1998; 2001–2004	keyboards	Møller toured with the band in promotion of Spooked, then again after the release of Carpe Diem and Planet Panic.
	Jørgen Thorup (touring member)	2001	keyboards	Thorup briefly replaced Møller as the band's touring keyboardist during early 2001.
	Jacob Troutner (touring member)	2004	keyboards	Troutner stood in on keyboards for two shows in the summer of 2004 when Møller became unavailable.
	H. C. Schröder	2006	keyboards	Schröder performed keyboards on Wake Up to the Real World and at two shows in Denmark in December 2006.
	Kim Olesen	2016	keyboards	After the departure of Sandager in February 2016, Olesen performed session keyboards on Kingmaker.

== Lineups ==
Period	Members	Releases
1981	John Jakobsen — lead vocals, bass; Ken Hammer — guitar, backing vocals; Other members unknown	none
Late 1981–April 1984	Ronnie Atkins — lead vocals; Ken Hammer — lead guitar, backing vocals; Pete Collins — rhythm guitar; John Darrow — bass, backing vocals; Phil Moorheed — drums; Alan Owen — keyboards	Heavy Metal demo (1983); Pretty Maids EP (1983)
May–September 1984	Ronnie Atkins — lead vocals; Ken Hammer — lead guitar, backing vocals; Rick Hanson — rhythm guitar; Allan Delong — bass; Phil Moorheed — drums; Alan Owen — keyboards	Red Hot and Heavy (1984)
October 1984	Ronnie Atkins — lead vocals; Ken Hammer — lead guitar, backing vocals; Benny Petersen — rhythm guitar; Allan Delong — bass; Phil Moorheed — drums; Alan Owen — keyboards	none
Late 1984–early 1986	Ronnie Atkins — lead vocals; Ken Hammer — lead guitar, backing vocals; Pete Collins — rhythm guitar; Allan Delong — bass; Phil Moorheed — drums; Alan Owen — keyboards	none
Early 1986–early 1987	Ronnie Atkins — lead vocals; Ken Hammer — guitar, backing vocals; Allan Delong — bass; Phil Moorheed — drums; Alan Owen — keyboards	Future World (1987)
Spring 1987–early 1988	Ronnie Atkins — lead vocals; Ken Hammer — lead guitar, backing vocals; Angel Schleifer — rhythm guitar; Allan Delong — bass; Phil Moorheed — drums; Alan Owen — keyboards	none
Spring 1988–September 1989	Ronnie Atkins — lead vocals; Ken Hammer — lead guitar, backing vocals; Ricky Marx — rhythm guitar; Allan Delong — bass; Phil Moorheed — drums; Alan Owen — keyboards	Jump the Gun (1990); In Santa's Claws (1990)
Late 1989–December 1990	Ronnie Atkins — lead vocals; Ken Hammer — lead guitar, backing vocals; Ricky Marx — rhythm guitar; Allan Delong — bass; Phil Moorheed — drums; Dominic Gale — keyboards (session/touring)	none — some recording for In Santa's Claws
Early 1991–1996	Ronnie Atkins — lead vocals; Ken Hammer — guitar, backing vocals; Kenn Jackson — bass, backing vocals; Michael Fast — drums, backing vocals; Dominic Gale — keyboards (session/touring)	Sin-Decade (1992); Stripped (1993); Scream (1994); Screamin' Live (1995)
1996–2001	Ronnie Atkins — lead vocals; Ken Hammer — guitar, backing vocals; Kenn Jackson — bass, backing vocals; Michael Fast — drums, backing vocals; Alan Owen — keyboards (session); Jan Møller — keyboards (touring, 1997)	Spooked (1997); Anything Worth Doing Is Worth Overdoing (1999); Carpe Diem (2000); Planet Panic (2002)
Early–mid 2001	Ronnie Atkins — lead vocals; Ken Hammer — guitar, backing vocals; Kenn Jackson — bass, backing vocals; Michael Fast — drums, backing vocals; Jørgen Thorup — keyboards (touring)	Alive at Least (2002)
2001–2004	Ronnie Atkins — lead vocals; Ken Hammer — guitar, backing vocals; Kenn Jackson — bass, backing vocals; Michael Fast — drums, backing vocals; Jan Møller — keyboards (touring)	Alive at Least (2002)
Summer 2004	Ronnie Atkins — lead vocals; Ken Hammer — lead guitar, backing vocals; Rene Shades — rhythm guitar (touring); Kenn Jackson — bass, backing vocals; Michael Fast — drums, backing vocals; Jacob Troutner — keyboards (touring)	none
Band inactive 2005–2006
April–December 2006	Ronnie Atkins — lead vocals; Ken Hammer — guitar, backing vocals; Kenn Jackson — bass, backing vocals; Allan Tschicaja — drums; H. C. Shröder — keyboards (session/touring)	Wake Up to the Real World (2006)
Mid 2007–April 2010	Ronnie Atkins — lead vocals; Ken Hammer — guitar, backing vocals; Kenn Jackson — bass, backing vocals; Allan Tschicaja — drums; Morten Sandager — keyboards	Pandemonium (2010)
May 2010–April 2011	Ronnie Atkins — lead vocals; Ken Hammer — guitar, backing vocals; Hal Patino — bass; Allan Tschicaja — drums; Morten Sandager — keyboards	none
May 2011–February 2016	Ronnie Atkins — lead vocals; Ken Hammer — guitar, backing vocals; Rene Shades — bass, backing vocals; Allan Tschicaja — drums; Morten Sandager — keyboards	It Comes Alive: Maid in Switzerland (2012); Motherland (2013); Louder Than Ever (2014)
February–June 2016	Ronnie Atkins — lead vocals; Ken Hammer — guitar, backing vocals; Rene Shades — bass, backing vocals; Allan Tschicaja — drums; Kim Olesen — keyboards (session)	Kingmaker (2016)
September 2016–May 2017	Ronnie Atkins — lead vocals; Ken Hammer — guitar, backing vocals; Rene Shades — bass, backing vocals; Allan Tschicaja — drums; Chris Laney — keyboards, rhythm guitar	none
May 2017–July 2019	Ronnie Atkins — lead vocals; Ken Hammer — guitar, backing vocals; Rene Shades — bass, backing vocals; Allan Sørensen — drums; Chris Laney — keyboards, rhythm guitar	Undress Your Madness (2019); Maid in Japan (2020)
July 2019–present	Ronnie Atkins — lead vocals; Ken Hammer — guitar, backing vocals; Rene Shades — bass, backing vocals; Allan Tschicaja — drums; Chris Laney — keyboards, rhythm guitar	none to date
