= Louder Than Ever (album) =

Studio album by Pretty Maids
- Released: 21 March 2014
- Genres: Hard rock, heavy metal
- Label: Frontiers
- Producer: Jacob Hansen

Pretty Maids chronology
Motherland (2013)	Louder Than Ever (2014)	Kingmaker (2016)

Louder Than Ever is the fourteenth studio album by Danish hard rock/heavy metal Pretty Maids. It was released on 21 March 2014 by Frontiers Records. The album consists of re-recordings of eight previously released songs from the period 1994 to 2006, taken from the studio albums Scream (1994), Anything Worth Doing Is Worth Overdoing (1999), Carpe Diem (2000), Planet Panic (2002), and Wake Up to the Real World (2006). It also features the four new songs, "Deranged", "My Soul to Take", "Nuclear Boomerang", and "A Heart Without a Home" which was recorded especially for the album. An official music video for "Nuclear Boomerang" was released on 10 February 2014.

According to lead singer Ronnie Atkins, Louder Than Ever serves as an "in between album" to tie in with the band's upcoming fifteenth studio album. Atkins has said the band "were curious to hear how some of the older songs would sound like with the band lineup we have today and in the hands of our current producer, Jacob Hansen." The band deliberately chose not to re-record songs from albums such as Future World (1987) and Jump the Gun (1990) as they are "sacred, both to ourselves as well as the fans".

== Single and videos ==
None of the album tracks were released as singles, but there were 3 official music videos:

- "Nuclear Boomerang" released on 10 February 2014
- "My Soul to Take" released on 10 March 2014
- "A Heart Without a Home" released on 28 November 2014

== Critical reception ==
Professional ratings
Review scores
Source	Rating
Metal.de	7/10
Metal Rules	4/5
MelodicRock.com	92%
The Metal Crypt	3.5/5
Hardrock Haven	8.5/10

Louder Than Ever received generally positive reviews from music critics. Michael Stalling of Metal.de rated the album 7/10, praising Ronnie Atkins' vocal performance and the band's continued musical strength, although he considered two of the four new songs, "Deranged" and "My Soul to Take", stronger than "Nuclear Boomerang" and "A Heart Without a Home".

JP of Metal Rules awarded it 4/5, describing the re-recorded material as having renewed energy and praising the four new songs as being as good as, or better than, the band's previous work. MelodicRock.com awarded the album 92%, describing it as a high-energy melodic metal release and highlighting the quality of its four new compositions.

MetalMike of The Metal Crypt gave it 3.5/5, praising its melodic riffs, catchy songwriting, strong choruses and polished production, while noting its appeal to listeners favouring melodic heavy metal over more extreme styles. Justin Gaines of Hardrock Haven rated the album 8.5/10, describing the four new songs as particularly strong and considering the collection a worthwhile release for the band's fans.

== Track listing ==
Standard version
No.	Title	Length
1.	"Deranged"	3:34
2.	"Playing God" (originally from Planet Panic, 2002)	3:53
3.	"Psycho Time Bomb Planet Earth" (originally from Scream, 1994)	3:42
4.	"My Soul to Take"	4:23
5.	"He Who Never Lived" (originally from Planet Panic, 2002)	4:38
6.	"Virtual Brutality" (originally from Planet Panic, 2002)	4:21
7.	"Tortured Spirit" (originally from Carpe Diem, 2000)	4:14
8.	"With These Eyes" (originally from Anything Worth Doing Is Worth Overdoing, 1999)	5:13
9.	"Nuclear Boomerang"	4:58
10.	"Snakes in Eden" (originally from Anything Worth Doing Is Worth Overdoing, 1999)	4:07
11.	"Wake Up to the Real World" (originally from Wake Up to the Real World, 2006)	3:52
12.	"A Heart Without a Home"	4:37

- The album was also released as a CD/DVD edition with the bonus DVD titled Why So Serious - A Retrospective of the "Motherland" 2013 World Tour.

== Charts ==
Chart (2014)	Peak position
Danish Albums (Hitlisten)	11
German Albums (Offizielle Top 100)	59
Japanese Albums (Oricon)	93
Swiss Albums (Schweizer Hitparade)	52
