= Spooked (Pretty Maids album) =

Studio album by Pretty Maids
- Released: 19 February 1997
- Genres: Heavy metal, hard rock
- Label: Massacre Records
- Producer: Tommy Hansen

Pretty Maids chronology
Screamin' Live (1995)	Spooked (1997)	Anything Worth Doing Is Worth Overdoing (1999)

Spooked is the seventh studio album by Danish heavy metal band Pretty Maids, released on 19 February 1997 through Massacre Records. The album was subsequently released in Japan by Epic Records on 9 April 1997, with three additional tracks. Spooked was produced by Tommy Hansen, and continued the band's combination of heavy metal and melodic hard rock. It includes a cover of Kiss's song "Hard Luck Woman".

The album reached number 74 on the German Albums Chart.

== Background ==
A contemporary article in Horsens Folkeblad described the record as a return to the band's musical roots. Singer Ronnie Atkins explained that they had attempted to recapture the energy of the 1980s.

The album was produced and mixed by Tommy Hansen, who had previously worked with the band on Red Hot and Heavy. In a 2000 interview with Metal Reviews, guitarist Ken Hammer said that he considered Spooked one of Pretty Maids' best albums and praised its songwriting, although he was dissatisfied with aspects of its sound, particularly some of the drum recordings. He explained that the band subsequently decided to take a different production approach on their next album, Anything Worth Doing Is Worth Overdoing (1999).

== Critical reception ==
Professional ratings
Review scores
Source	Rating
MelodicRock.com	70%
Music Waves	4/5

Spooked received positive reviews from specialist rock and metal publications. MelodicRock.com awarded the album 70%, describing it as a relatively heavy European metal release, with strong guitar work, melodies and vocals. The review particularly noted the album's limited ballad content, identifying it as a record primarily aimed at fans of heavier hard rock.

In a review published in 2012, Music Waves awarded the album four out of five stars. The reviewer considered it slightly inferior to Scream (1994), describing its sound as a mixture of hard rock and speed metal, with a somewhat less melodic approach. The review praised the heavier songs, particularly "Freakshow", "Dead or Alive" and "The One That Should Not Be", while considering the Kiss cover less successful. It nevertheless concluded that the album confirmed Pretty Maids' established musical identity.

=== Ronnie Atkins ===
In a 2006 interview, Atkins identified the songwriting on Spooked as among the band's strongest, although he also expressed reservations about the album's mix. He reiterated his positive assessment in a 2018 interview with Metal Covenant, describing it as a very good album.

== Track listing ==
All songs written by Ken Hammer and Ronnie Atkins, except where noted.

No.	Title	Writer(s)	Length
1.	"Resurrection (Intro)"	Alan Owen, Hammer, Atkins	1:13
2.	"Freakshow"		3:54
3.	"Dead or Alive"		4:35
4.	"Die with Your Dreams"		5:09
5.	"Fly Me Out"		4:37
6.	"Live Until It Hurts"		4:37
7.	"Spooked"		5:06
8.	"Twisted"		4:10
9.	"If It Can't Be Love"		5:55
10.	"Never Too Late"		4:26
11.	"Your Mind Is Where the Money Is"		5:05
12.	"Hard Luck Woman" (Kiss cover)	Paul Stanley	3:25
13.	"The One That Should Not Be"		4:02

== Personnel ==
Adapted from the album's liner notes

Pretty Maids

- Ronnie Atkins – vocals
- Ken Hammer – guitar
- Kenn Jackson – bass
- Michael Fast – drums

Additional musician

- Alan Owen – keyboards

Production

- Tommy Hansen – production, mixing

== Charts ==
Chart performance for Spooked
Chart (1997)	Peak position
German Albums (Offizielle Deutsche Charts)	74
