= Maid in Japan – Future World Live 30 Anniversary =

Live album by Pretty Maids
- Released: 22 May 2020
- Recorded: November 2018
- Venue: Japan
- Genres: Hard rock; heavy metal
- Length: 73:32
- Label: Frontiers Records

Pretty Maids chronology
Undress Your Madness (2019)	Maid in Japan – Future World Live 30 Anniversary (2020)

Maid in Japan – Future World Live 30 Anniversary is a live album by Danish hard rock band Pretty Maids, released on 22 May 2020 by Frontiers Records. Recorded in Japan in November 2018, the album documents the band's performances celebrating the 30th anniversary of their second studio album, Future World (1987). The set features the original album performed in its entirety, alongside five songs from other periods of the band's career.

The album reached number 31 on the German Albums Chart and number 27 on the Swiss Albums Chart.

== Background and recording ==
To commemorate the 30th anniversary of Future World, Pretty Maids toured during 2017 and 2018 performing the album in its entirety. The band subsequently decided to record and film the performances in Japan, where they had maintained a strong following since the 1980s. The recordings were made during two concerts in November 2018. Singer Ronnie Atkins explained that the decision to record in Japan was influenced by the country's longstanding importance to the band and the fact that they had not previously filmed a live release there. He recalled the November performances as particularly enjoyable, describing the Japanese audience as enthusiastic and dedicated.

The concert programme was built around the complete Future World album, with additional songs from the band's later releases. These included Motherland (2013), Kingmaker (2016) and Undress Your Madness (2019).

== Release ==
The album was released on 22 May 2020 through Frontiers Records. It was issued in several formats, including CD, DVD, Blu-ray and vinyl editions. The DVD and Blu-ray editions include the concert footage, documentaries about the band’s 2018 appearances in Balingen and Japan, interviews with Atkins, guitarist Ken Hammer, keyboardist and guitarist Chris Laney, and bassist René Shades, as well as promotional music videos released between 2010 and 2019.

== Critical reception ==
Professional ratings
Review scores
Source	Rating
Rockline	8/10
Eternal Terror	5/6
Metal-Rules	4/5
Get Ready to ROCK!	4/5 stars
Heavy Music HQ	3.5/5

The album received generally positive reviews from music critics. Rockline rated it 8 out of 10, describing Future World as an important part of the band's catalogue and praising the performance as a celebration of the record. Writing for Eternal Terror, J.N. awarded the album five out of six, praising the band's energetic performance, the clarity and dynamics of the production, and Atkins's vocal delivery. The reviewer also commended the accompanying video presentation and its additional documentary and interview material.

Metal-Rules gave the release four out of five, with reviewer JP highlighting the significance of performing Future World in its entirety for the anniversary. The review also discussed the band's return to the material more than three decades after its original release. Jason Ritchie of Get Ready to ROCK! also awarded it four out of five stars. He praised the band's performances of songs such as "Loud 'n' Proud", "We Came to Rock" and "Yellow Rain", and considered the additional DVD material a worthwhile part of the release.

Chad Bowar of Heavy Music HQ rated the album 3.5 out of 5, noting Atkins's continued energy and the appeal of hearing the band's 1987 album performed in full. He also highlighted the documentaries, interviews and promotional videos included with the release.

== Track listing ==
The original album Future World is represented in its entirety by tracks 2–10. All tracks are written by Ronnie Atkins and Ken Hammer.

No.	Title	Length
1.	"FW30"	1:33
2.	"Future World"	5:58
3.	"We Came to Rock"	4:57
4.	"Love Games"	4:50
5.	"Yellow Rain"	7:07
6.	"Loud 'n' Proud"	4:18
7.	"Rodeo"	5:07
8.	"Needles in the Dark"	5:23
9.	"Eye of the Storm"	5:28
10.	"Long Way to Go"	4:36
11.	"Mother of All Lies"	5:59
12.	"Kingmaker"	3:51
13.	"Bull's Eye"	4:11
14.	"Little Drops of Heaven"	5:21
15.	"Sin-Decade"	4:47
Total length:		73:32

== Personnel ==
Credits adapted from the album’s release information.

Pretty Maids

- Ronnie Atkins – vocals
- Ken Hammer – guitars
- René Shades – bass
- Chris Laney – keyboards, guitars
- Allan Sørensen – drums

Production

- Hiroki Forutani – recording
- Jacob Hansen – mixing, mastering
- Kai Brockschmidt – artwork

== Charts ==
Chart (2020)	Peak position
Switzerland (Schweizer Hitparade)	27
Germany (Offizielle Top 100)	31
