= It Comes Alive - Maid in Switzerland =

It Comes Alive – Maid in Switzerland

Live album by Pretty Maids
- Released: 23 March 2012
- Recorded: 1 October 2011
- Venues: Z7 Konzertfabrik, Pratteln, Switzerland
- Genres: Heavy metal, hard rock
- Length: 113:04
- Label: Frontiers Records
- Producer: Jacob Hansen

Pretty Maids chronology
Pandemonium (2010)	It Comes Alive – Maid in Switzerland (2012)	Motherland (2013)

It Comes Alive – Maid in Switzerland is the third live album by Danish heavy metal band Pretty Maids. Released on 23 March 2012 through Frontiers Records, the album commemorates the band's 30th anniversary. It was recorded and filmed during a single performance on 1 October 2011 at the Z7 Konzertfabrik in Pratteln, Switzerland, while the band was touring in support of their 2010 studio album Pandemonium.

The release was distributed as a multi-disc package, consisting of two audio CDs and a companion concert DVD. The DVD also included a 42-minute documentary entitled ‘‘It Comes Alive – The Movie’’, featuring interviews with the band and fans, alongside backstage footage.

== Critical reception ==
Professional ratings
Review scores
Source	Rating
MetalKaoz	8/10
Rushonrock	8/10
Eternal Terror	4/6

It Comes Alive - Maid in Switzerland received generally favourable reviews from music critics. Grigoris Chronis of MetalKaoz awarded the album 8/10, praising its sound quality, Ronnie Atkins's vocals and Ken Hammer's guitar work. He also commended the career-spanning setlist, which combined material from the band's more recent releases with songs from their 1980s catalogue, concluding that the two hour performance was a must-buy for fans.

Simon Rushworth of Rushonrock also awarded it 8/10, describing Pretty Maids as having rarely sounded better. He praised the band's songwriting and stagecraft, highlighting the versatility of its melodic rock sound and Atkins's performance, and argued that the group deserved considerably greater commercial success.

Jorgen Garmann of Eternal Terror was more reserved, awarding the album 4/6. He praised Atkins's clear vocal performance, the production and the variety of material across the 21 tracks, but felt that some of the band's music sounded dated. Nevertheless, he acknowledged the effectiveness of several songs in a live setting and the atmosphere created by the audience.

== Track listing ==
All songs written by Ken Hammer and Ronnie Atkins, except where noted.

=== CD 1 ===
No.	Title	Writer(s)	Length
1.	"Pandemonium"	Ronnie Atkins, Ken Hammer, Morten Sandager	7:16
2.	"I.N.V.U."		4:41
3.	"Hell on High Heels"		4:45
4.	"Wake Up to the Real World"		3:55
5.	"Destination Paradise"		3:55
6.	"Another Shot of Your Love"		4:38
7.	"Scream"		4:36
8.	"Walk Away"		7:25
9.	"It Comes at Night"		5:08
Total length:			46:19

=== CD 2 ===
No.	Title	Writer(s)	Length
1.	"Queen of Dreams"		5:10
2.	"Savage Heart"		5:34
3.	"Clay"		4:05
4.	"Yellow Rain"		6:30
5.	"Rock the House"		2:57
6.	"Back to Back"	Atkins, Hammer, Alan Owen	4:25
7.	"Rodeo"		4:35
8.	"Lovegames"		4:55
9.	"Future World"		6:19
10.	"Little Drops of Heaven"		4:43
11.	"Please Don't Leave Me"	John Sykes, Phil Lynott	7:48
12.	"Red, Hot and Heavy"		9:44
Total length:			66:45

== Personnel ==
Pretty Maids

- Ronnie Atkins – lead vocals
- Ken Hammer – guitars
- René Shades – bass
- Allan Tschicaja – drums
- Morten Sandager – keyboards

Production

- Jacob Hansen – audio mixing, engineering, mastering
- Ronald Matthes – film director
- The Digital Dictators – cover art, layout, 3D animation

== Charts ==
Chart (2012)	Peak position
Denmark (Tracklisten)	23
Germany (Offizielle Top 100)	81
Sweden (Sverigetopplistan)	46
Switzerland (Schweizer Hitparade)	37
