= Anything Worth Doing Is Worth Overdoing =

Studio album by Pretty Maids
- Released: 27 February 1999
- Recorded: June–August 1998
- Studios: Puk Studios; Jailhouse Studios; Studio One
- Genres: Heavy metal, hard rock
- Length: 49:28
- Label: Massacre Records
- Producers: Ronnie Atkins, Ken Hammer

Pretty Maids chronology
Spooked (1997)	Anything Worth Doing Is Worth Overdoing (1999)	Carpe Diem (2000)

Anything Worth Doing Is Worth Overdoing is the eighth studio album by Danish heavy metal band Pretty Maids, released on 27 February 1999 through Massacre Records. It followed Spooked (1997) and preceded Carpe Diem (2000).

The album reached number 71 on the German Albums Chart.

== Recording and release ==
The album was recorded between June and August 1998 at Puk Studios, Jailhouse Studios and Studio One in Denmark. It was produced by vocalist Ronnie Atkins and guitarist Ken Hammer. In a November 2000 interview with Metal Reviews, Hammer explained that the band had been unhappy with the sound of Spooked, particularly aspects of its drum recordings. Although he considered that album's songwriting among the band's strongest, he said that Pretty Maids wanted to try a different production approach on its successor. Hammer confirmed that he and Atkins had produced Anything Worth Doing Is Worth Overdoing themselves, and said that he believed the decision had been the right one.

The Japanese edition was issued by Epic Records with the same release date of 27 February 1999.

== Critical reception ==
Professional ratings
Review scores
Source	Rating
Shock!	8/10
Music Waves	4/5

The album received a positive review from Hungarian music magazine Shock!. In a review published on 28 March 1999, Schmidt Péter awarded it eight out of ten, praising its combination of heavy guitar riffs, Ronnie Atkins' vocal melodies and Alan Owen's keyboard arrangements. He described the music as a blend of European heavy metal and the more melodic hard rock approach associated with late-1980s American bands, and considered it Pretty Maids' strongest album since Jump the Gun, although not a classic in its own right.

In a 2010 review for Music Waves, Noise awarded the album four out of five stars, describing it as a top-quality heavy rock album.

== Track listing ==
All songs were written by Ronnie Atkins and Ken Hammer.

No.	Title	Length
1.	"Snakes in Eden"	5:16
2.	"Destination Paradise"	3:31
3.	"Hell on High Heels"	4:06
4.	"When the Angels Cry"	5:55
5.	"Back Off"	3:50
6.	"Only in America"	4:01
7.	"With These Eyes"	5:15
8.	"Anything Worth Doing Is Worth Overdoing"	4:11
9.	"Scent of My Prey"	4:11
10.	"Face Me"	4:26
11.	"Loveshine"	4:46
Total length:		49:28

== Personnel ==
Adapted from the album's liner notes

Pretty Maids

- Ronnie Atkins – vocals, producer
- Ken Hammer – guitar, producer
- Kenn Jackson – bass
- Michael Fast – drums
- Alan Owen – keyboards

Additional personnel

- Knud Lindhard – backing vocals
- Henrik Nilsson – mixing
- Peter Dahl – mastering
- Søren Solkær – photography
- Jakob Tranberg – artwork

== Charts ==
Chart (1999)	Peak position
German Albums (Offizielle Deutsche Charts)	71
