= Make It Count =

Studio album by Ronnie Atkins
- Released: 18 March 2022
- Genres: Hard rock, heavy metal
- Label: Frontiers
- Producer: Chris Laney

Ronnie Atkins chronology
4 More Shots (The Acoustics) (2021)	Make It Count (2022)	Symphomaniac (2022)

Singles from Make It Count
- 1. "Unsung Heroes" Released: 8 December 2021; 2. "Rising Tide" Released: 6 January 2022; 3. "I've Hurt Myself (By Hurting You)" Released: 25 March 2022

Make It Count is second solo studio album by Danish hard rock singer and songwriter Ronnie Atkins. The album was released on 18 March 2022 by Frontiers Records. It is the follow-up to Atkins' debut album, One Shot (2021), which was also produced by Swedish guitarist Chris Laney.

== Track listing ==
All tracks are written by Ronnie Atkins; except "Blood Cries Out" written by Atkins and Chris Laney.

No.	Title	Length
1.	"I've Hurt Myself (By Hurting You)"	5:21
2.	"Unsung Heroes"	4:18
3.	"Rising Tide"	4:43
4.	"Remain to Remind Me"	3:54
5.	"The Tracks We Leave Behind"	4:28
6.	"All I Ask of You"	4:13
7.	"Grace"	3:25
8.	"Let Love Lead the Way"	5:16
9.	"Blood Cries Out"	4:19
10.	"Easier to Leave (Than Being Left Behind)"	3:42
11.	"Fallen"	4:47
12.	"Make It Count"	5:45

Japanese version — bonus track
No.	Title	Length
13.	"Rising Tide" (extended version)

== Personnel ==
- Ronnie Atkins – lead vocals, backing vocals
- Chris Laney – producer, arrangement, guitar, keyboards
- Jacob Hansen – mixer, mastering
- Allan Sørensen – drums
- Pontus Egberg – bass
- Morten Sandager – keyboards
- Anders Ringman – acoustic guitar
- Oliver Hartmann – guitar
- John Berg – guitar
- Lasse Wellander – guitar
- Linnea Vikström – backing vocals

== Charts ==
Chart (2022)	Peak position
German Albums (Offizielle Top 100)	26
Swiss Albums (Schweizer Hitparade)	17
