= Kingmaker (Pretty Maids album) =

Studio album by Pretty Maids
- Released: 21 October 2016
- Recorded: February–June 2016
- Studios: Hansen Studios, Ribe; Medley Studio, Copenhagen; and LaneyLand
- Genres: Hard rock, heavy metal
- Label: Frontiers
- Producer: Jacob Hansen

Pretty Maids chronology
Louder Than Ever (2015)	Kingmaker (2016)	Undress Your Madness (2019)

Singles from Kingmaker
- 1. "Face the World" Released: 29 August 2016

Kingmaker is the fifteenth studio album by Danish hard rock/heavy metal Pretty Maids. The album was released in Japan on 21 October 2016, and in the rest of the world on 4 November 2016 by Frontiers Records. It is the first album of all new material since Motherland (2013). Kingmaker is the first album without keyboard player Morten Sandager who left the band in February 2016 after joining Pretty Maids in 2006. Instead Kim Olesen of Anubis Gate plays keyboards on the album.

In an interview with The Classic Metal Show, lead singer Ronnie Atkins said of the album: "Basically we are big pop freaks as well. We like all kinds of music and to us a good song is a good song. Some of the stuff is actually written on an acoustic guitar. There are songs on the album that are basically pop songs. You could take songs like "Heavens Little Devil", basically just a pop song. The challenge is turning a pop song into a rock song."

The album debuted at number 35 on the German Albums Chart, becoming Pretty Maids' highest-charting album since Jump the Gun in 1990 (which also charted at number 35). However, the album failed to chart in their native Denmark.

Danish music magazine Gaffa rated the album four out of five stars and wrote: "Kingmaker is thus the third album in a row, where there is a vast majority of hits compared to misses."

== Single and videos ==
The album's only single was "Face the World", released on 29 August 2016, accompanied by a music video.

Two songs were released on streaming services but not as singles:

- "Humanize Me" released 20 September 2016
- "Heaven's Little Devil" released 13 October 2016

Both songs now show as music videos on the band's official website.

A music video for the title track, "Kingmaker", followed on 24 October 2016.

== Critical reception ==
Professional ratings
Review scores
Source	Rating
Rock Hard	8/10
Metal Temple	7/10
Classic Rock	3/5 stars

Kingmaker received generally favourable reviews from music critics. Rock Hard awarded the album 8/10, stating it was a "real powerhouse" and highlighting the consistency of Pretty Maids' catalogue. They praised the songwriting, noting the band knew exactly how to blend strong melodies with driving riffs.

Anton Sanatov of Metal Temple rated the album 7/10, praising its songwriting, musicianship and combination of melodic passages with heavier metal elements. However, he considered its sound overly familiar and criticised the production for being excessive at times, despite describing the performances as top-notch. Reviewing the album for Classic Rock, Sleazegrinder awarded it three out of five stars, praising its energy, Ronnie Atkins’ vocals and Ken Hammer’s guitar work, while observing that the band retained much of the sound of their 1984 album Red, Hot and Heavy.

Jürgen Lugerth of laut.de noted the album’s combination of hard rock, heavy metal, melodic choruses and ballads, but considered its musical approach too similar to that of other melodic rock bands. He also felt that the emphasis on harmony could become tiresome.

== Track listing ==
All tracks are written by Ronnie Atkins and Ken Hammer.

No.	Title	Length
1.	"When God Took a Day Off"	6:01
2.	"Kingmaker"	4:16
3.	"Face the World"	3:59
4.	"Humanize Me"	4:13
5.	"Last Beauty on Earth"	4:05
6.	"Bull's Eye"	3:56
7.	"King of the Right Here and Now"	4:41
8.	"Heavens Little Devil"	3:48
9.	"Civilized Monsters"	4:57
10.	"Sickening"	3:45
11.	"Was That What You Wanted"	5:00

Japanese version (bonus tracks)
No.	Title	Length
12.	"Kingmaker" (extended version)
13.	"Humanize Me" (extended version)

iTunes Store version (bonus track)
No.	Title	Length
12.	"Kingmaker" (extended version)	5:46

== Personnel ==
- Ronnie Atkins – vocals, writer
- Ken Hammer – guitar, writer
- René Shades – bass, bass and guitar solos engineering
- Allan Tschicaja – drums
- Kim Olesen – keyboards
- Jacob Hansen – producer, engineer, mixer, mastering
- Chris Laney – additional guitar solos engineering
- Janne Stark – additional guitar solos engineering
- Jonas Haagensen – assistant engineer

== Charts ==
Chart (2016)	Peak position
Belgian Albums (Ultratop Wallonia)	99
French Albums (SNEP)	159
German Albums (Offizielle Top 100)	35
Japanese Albums (Oricon)	78
Swedish Albums (Sverigetopplistan)	36
Swiss Albums (Schweizer Hitparade)	31
