= Scream (Pretty Maids album) =

Studio album by Pretty Maids
- Released: 13 October 1994
- Recorded: 1994
- Studios: Sweet Silence Studios, Copenhagen
- Genres: Hard rock, Heavy metal
- Label: Epic
- Producers: Pretty Maids, Flemming Rasmussen

Pretty Maids chronology
Stripped (1993)	Scream (1994)	Screamin' Live (1995)

Scream is the sixth studio album by Danish hard rock band Pretty Maids. It was first released in Japan on 13 October 1994 through Epic Records, before receiving its European release on 13 January 1995. The album marked a return to the band's heavier guitar-oriented sound following the predominantly acoustic arrangements of their previous studio album, Stripped (1993).

== Background and recording ==
Following the release of Stripped, Pretty Maids returned to a heavier musical direction with Scream. The album reunited the band with producer and engineer Flemming Rasmussen, who had previously worked with them on Sin-Decade (1992). Rasmussen was associated with Sweet Silence Studios in Copenhagen, where the band recorded Scream.

In a 2000 interview with Metal Reviews, guitarist Ken Hammer discussed Rasmussen's involvement in the band's recordings. He explained that the connection developed partly because the band wanted to work at Sweet Silence, which Rasmussen owned. Hammer also discussed the songwriting partnership between himself and vocalist Ronnie Atkins, explaining that the pair were principally responsible for writing the band's material.

The album was released during a period in which hard rock and heavy metal bands faced a changing musical landscape following the commercial emergence of grunge. In a 2008 interview with Heavymetal.dk, Atkins reflected on the contrasting musical trends of the early 1990s and discussed the band's experiences during the period following the success of Sin-Decade.

== Release and reception ==
Scream marked a return to a heavier, more guitar-oriented sound following the predominantly acoustic arrangements of its predecessor, Stripped (1993). The album opens with the heavy metal songs "Rise", "Scream" and "Psycho-Time-Bomb-Planet-Earth", characterised by prominent guitar riffs and a powerful rhythm section. The remaining material combines faster heavy metal songs with mid-tempo tracks, melodic hard rock and ballads, including "In a World of Your Own" and "Anytime Anywhere".

"Walk Away" was promoted to European radio in 1995, appearing as a Power Play addition at the Polish rock station Radio Flash in April.

The album reached number 27 on the Danish albums chart, and number 92 on the German Albums Chart.

== Critical reception ==
Professional ratings
Review scores
Source	Rating
Aux Portes du Metal	Very Good
Metal Music Archives	3.5/5 stars
Rock Hard	8.5/10

Aux Portes du Metal praised Scream, describing it as the band's heaviest album to that point. The reviewer commended Flemming Rasmussen's production, particularly the powerful guitar sound and dynamic rhythm section, and praised the opening trio of "Rise", "Scream" and "Psycho-Time-Bomb-Planet-Earth". The review also highlighted "No Messiah" and "Adrenaline Junkie", although it criticised the more commercially oriented "Walk Away" and the ballads "In a World of Your Own" and "Anytime Anywhere". The reviewer considered the album the band's strongest release since Future World (1987).

In a retrospective review, UMUR of MetalMusicArchives awarded the album 3.5 out of 5, describing it as a return to heavier music following the predominantly acoustic Stripped. The reviewer praised the opening three tracks and the album's production, but considered the two ballads overly sentimental.

German magazine Rock Hard gave Scream 8.5 out of 10. The reviewer felt the band had ignored prevailing trends and shown that a distinctive heavy metal style could be carried into a new decade. The review praised the album's heavy sound, which the band co-produced with Flemming Rasmussen, and the consistently strong songwriting of Ken Hammer and Ronnie Atkins. It described Scream as a good, sometimes brilliant melodic power metal record covering everything from the hard-hitting "When It All Comes Down", the mid-tempo "Scream", and the ballads "Walk Away" and "In a World of Your Own".

== Track listing ==
All tracks written and arranged by Ronnie Atkins and Ken Hammer.

No.	Title	Length
1.	"Rise"	4:37
2.	"Scream"	4:35
3.	"Psycho-Time-Bomb-Planet-Earth"	3:46
4.	"This Love"	4:40
5.	"Walk Away"	4:54
6.	"No Messiah"	4:05
7.	"In a World of Your Own"	5:03
8.	"Don't Turn Your Sex on Me"	3:56
9.	"Adrenaline Junkie"	4:54
10.	"Anytime Anywhere"	4:56
Total length:		45:26

== Personnel ==
Credits adapted from the album's published recording information.

Pretty Maids

- Ronnie Atkins – vocals
- Ken Hammer – guitar
- Kenn Jackson – bass
- Michael Fast – drums
- Alan Owen – keyboards

Additional musicians

- Dominique Gale – piano
- Knud Lindhard – backing vocals

Production

- Pretty Maids – production
- Flemming Rasmussen – production, engineering, mixing
- Henrik Vindeby – engineering
- Knud Lindhard – engineering

== Charts ==
Chart performance for Scream
Chart (1995)	Peak position
Danish Albums Chart	27
German Albums Chart	92
