= Trinity (Ronnie Atkins album) =

Studio album by Ronnie Atkins
- Released: 13 October 2023
- Genres: Hard rock, heavy metal
- Label: Frontiers
- Producer: Chris Laney

Ronnie Atkins chronology
Symphomaniac (2022)	Trinity (2023)

Singles from Trinity
- 1. "Trinity" Released: 7 August 2023; 2. "If You Can Dream It (You Can Do It)" Released: 12 September 2023

Trinity is the third solo studio album by Danish hard rock singer and songwriter Ronnie Atkins. The album was released on 13 October 2023 by Frontiers Records. Atkins has said of the album: "Likely the heaviest of the three albums I've released so far but nevertheless it's very melodic and lyrically present".

== Track listing ==
All tracks are written by Ronnie Atkins.

No.	Title	Length
1.	"Trinity"	4:30
2.	"Ode to a Madman"	4:32
3.	"Paper Tiger"	3:59
4.	"Soul Divine"	5:03
5.	"Via Dolorosa"	1:30
6.	"Godless"	6:03
7.	"Shine"	5:22
8.	"If You Can Dream It"	3:41
9.	"Sister Sinister"	4:46
10.	"Raining Fire"	5:16
11.	"The Unwanted"	3:47
12.	"What If"	5:22

Japanese version (bonus track)
No.	Title	Length
13.	"Godless" (alternate mix version)	7:00

== Charts ==
Chart (2023)	Peak position
Swiss Albums (Schweizer Hitparade)	49
