= Thomas Hanson =

Thomas Hanson may refer to:

- Thomas Hawkins Hanson (1750–1812), American military general
- Thomas Grafton Hanson (1865–1945), United States Army officer
- Tom Hanson (Australian footballer) (1891–1986), Australian rules footballer
- Tom Hanson (American football) (1907–1985), American football halfback
- Thomas S. Hanson (born 1939), American politician
- Tom Hanson (photojournalist) (1967–2009), Canadian photojournalist
- Tommy Hanson (1986-2015), Major League Baseball pitcher
- Tom Hanson (actor), American actor and director
- Tom Hanson, character in 21 Jump Street

== See also ==
- Thomas Hansen (disambiguation)
