= Undress Your Madness =

Studio album by Pretty Maids
- Released: 8 November 2019
- Recorded: February 2019
- Studios: Hansen Studios, Ribe, Denmark; LaneyLand Studio and Palma Music Studios
- Genres: Hard rock, heavy metal
- Label: Frontiers
- Producer: Jacob Hansen

Pretty Maids chronology
Kingmaker (2016)	Undress Your Madness (2019)	Maid in Japan – Future World Live 30 Anniversary (2020)

Singles from Undress Your Madness
- 1. "Serpentine" Released: 6 September 2019; 2. "Firesoul Fly" Released: 14 October 2019; 3. "Undress Your Madness" Released: 2 November 2019

Undress Your Madness is the sixteenth studio album by Danish hard rock/heavy metal Pretty Maids. The album was released on 8 November 2019 by Frontiers Records.

The album was written and recorded from January to February 2019.

In October 2019, lead singer Ronnie Atkins announced that he had been diagnosed with lung cancer. As a result, the band had to postpone and eventually cancel the concert tour for the album.

== Background ==
Guitarist Ken Hammer and keyboardist Chris Laney began developing material for the album in the summer of 2018, writing some initial guitar riffs. In December vocalist Ronnie Atkins rented a house in Horsens, Denmark, where he and Hammer worked on songs using acoustic guitars. Laney joined them and the three recorded their material before Laney developed around eight songs at his studio in Stockholm. These were largely complete by the time the band reconvened for recording, and the remaining tracks were developed during rehearsals.

Atkins described the album as a continuation of the musical direction the band had pursued over the preceding decade, adding that it was more melodic than their previous releases. He said that the material had been written in a relatively short period, not long before recording began in February. The album was produced by Jacob Hansen, Atkins praised the band's working relationship, citing their shared musical outlook and the chemistry between them.

== Singles and videos ==
Three singles were released from the album:

- "Serpentine" released as a single and video on 6 September 2019
- "Firesoul Fly" released as a single on 14 October 2019
- "Undress Your Madness" released as a single on 2 November 2019

"Will You Still Kiss Me (If I See You in Heaven)" was released as a music video on 8 November 2019

== Critical reception ==
Professional ratings
Review scores
Source	Rating
Rock Hard	8/10
Metal.de	7/10
Sonic Perspectives	7.8/10

Undress Your Madness received generally favourable reviews from music critics. Rock Hard awarded the album 8 out of 10, while Metal.de gave it 7 out of 10. Markus Endres of metal.de praised the album's catchy hooks and melodies, although he felt that the songs were too compact and lacked musical development and tension. Carl Frederick of Sonic Perspectives awarded the album 7.8 out of 10, praising its songwriting, musicianship and production, but noting that its sound was largely indistinguishable from the band’s previous three albums.

== Track listing ==
All tracks are written by Ronnie Atkins and Ken Hammer; except "Undress Your Madness" and "Shadowlands" written by Atkins, Hammer and Chris Laney.

No.	Title	Length
1.	"Intro"	0:33
2.	"Serpentine"	4:16
3.	"Firesoul Fly"	4:16
4.	"Undress Your Madness"	4:20
5.	"Will You Still Kiss Me (If I See You in Heaven)"	3:59
6.	"Runaway World"	4:26
7.	"If You Want Peace (Prepare for War)"	4:16
8.	"Slavedriver"	4:49
9.	"Shadowlands"	3:54
10.	"Black Thunder"	3:46
11.	"Strength of a Rose"	4:40

Japanese version (bonus track)
No.	Title	Length
12.	"Serpentine" (orchestral version)

== Personnel ==
- Ronnie Atkins – vocals
- Ken Hammer – guitar
- René Shades – bass
- Chris Laney – keyboards, guitar
- Allan Sørensen – drums
- Jacob Hansen – producer, engineer, mixer, mastering

== Charts ==
Chart (2019)	Peak position
Belgian Albums (Ultratop Wallonia)	131
French Albums (SNEP)	172
German Albums (Offizielle Top 100)	36
Swedish Albums (Sverigetopplistan)	31
Swiss Albums (Schweizer Hitparade)	13
UK Rock & Metal Albums (Official Charts)	15
