= Thomas Hansen =

Thomas Hansen may refer to:

- Tom Hansen (Nebraska politician) (1946–2025), American state legislator
- Tom Hansen (South Dakota politician) (born 1939), member of the South Dakota House of Representatives
- Thomas Blom Hansen (born 1958), Danish anthropologist
- Thomas Hansen (captain) (1762–1837), master of the first mission ship to New Zealand
- Thomas Hansen (musician) (1976–2007), Norwegian artist, known as Saint Thomas

== Sportspeople ==
- Tom Hansen (athlete) (born 1948), Danish runner
- Tom Hansen (biathlete) (born 1968), Canadian
- Thomas Hansen (cricketer) (born 1976), Danish cricketer
- Thomas Hansen (footballer, born 1983), Danish footballer
- Tommy Hansen (footballer, born 1950), Danish football midfielder
- Tommy Hansen (footballer, born 1967), Norwegian football midfielder

== Characters ==
- Tom Hansen, in film (500) Days of Summer
- Tom Hansen, protagonist of the video game Cold Fear

== See also ==
- Thomas Hanson (disambiguation)
