= Stripped (Pretty Maids album) =

Studio album by Pretty Maids
- Released: 6 September 1993
- Recorded: July 1992 and March 1993
- Studios: Werner Studios, Copenhagen; Sony Music Studio; Studio One
- Genre: Hard rock
- Length: 38:12
- Label: Columbia Records
- Producers: Pretty Maids, Henrik Nilsson

Pretty Maids chronology
Sin-Decade (1992)	Stripped (1993)	Scream (1994)

Singles from Stripped
- 1. "If It Ain't Gonna Change" Released: 1993; 2. "Please Don't Leave Me" Released: 10 July 1993

Stripped is the fifth studio album by Danish hard rock band Pretty Maids, released on 6 September 1993 through Columbia Records. The album features predominantly acoustic arrangements, representing a departure from the heavier sound of the band's preceding releases. In an August 1993 interview, Atkins described the recording as a deliberate change of direction, explaining that the band had previously spent much of the preceding decade making similar-sounding records. The album combines material previously recorded for the Japanese EP Off-Side with five new songs. The track listing also includes acoustic interpretations of "Please Don't Leave Me", written by Phil Lynott and John Sykes, and Queen's "'39", written by Brian May.

The album reached number 85 on the German Albums Chart, where it spent four weeks in the chart between September and October 1993.

== Critical reception ==
Professional ratings
Review scores
Source	Rating
Rock Hard	6/10
metal.de	4/10
Metallized	70/100

Stripped received mixed reviews from critics. Rock Hard awarded the album 6 out of 10, while Music & Media, reviewing the album in October 1993, highlighted its predominantly acoustic approach and praised the performances.

In a retrospective review, metal.de gave the album 4 out of 10, regarding it as a largely unnecessary departure from the band's heavier sound. Metallized was more favourable, awarding it 70 out of 100 and describing it as an enjoyable acoustic release, although not necessarily the best starting point for listeners discovering the band.

== Track listing ==
All songs were written by Ronnie Atkins and Ken Hammer, except where noted.

No.	Title	Length
1.	"If It Ain't Gonna Change"	3:34
2.	"Please Don't Leave Me" ((Phil Lynott, John Sykes))	3:20
3.	"In the Minds of the Young"	4:12
4.	"Too Late, Too Loud"	3:31
5.	"Say the Word"	4:43
6.	"'39" ((Brian May))	3:17
7.	"Heartbeat from Heaven"	3:49
8.	"How Does It Feel"	4:22
9.	"I'll Be There"	3:02
10.	"Savage Heart"	4:12
Total length:		38:12

== Personnel ==
Credits adapted from the album's release information.

Pretty Maids

- Ronnie Atkins – lead vocals, arrangements
- Ken Hammer – electric guitar, acoustic guitar, backing vocals, arrangements
- Kenn Jackson – bass guitar, backing vocals
- Michael Fast – drums, percussion, backing vocals

Additional musicians

- Dominic Gale – keyboards
- Henrik Nilsson – additional keyboards

Technical

- Pretty Maids – production, mixing
- Henrik Nilsson – production, mixing, engineering
- Knud Lindhard – engineering, backing vocals
- Morten Henningsen – engineering
- Allan Krohn – engineering

== Charts ==
Chart performance for Stripped
Chart (1993)	Peak position	Weeks
German Albums (Offizielle Deutsche Charts)	85	4
