= Pandemonium (Pretty Maids album) =

Studio album by Pretty Maids
- Released: 14 May 2010
- Recorded: January–February 2010 at Hansen Studios, Ribe, Denmark
- Genres: Hard rock, heavy metal
- Label: Frontiers
- Producer: Jacob Hansen

Pretty Maids chronology
Wake Up to the Real World (2006)	Pandemonium (2010)	It Comes Alive - Maid in Switzerland (2012)

Singles from Pandemonium
- 1. "Little Drops of Heaven" Released: 16 April 2010

Pandemonium is the twelfth studio album by Danish hard rock/heavy metal band Pretty Maids. The album was released on 14 May 2010 on Frontiers Records. Lead singer Ronnie Atkins has called the album "the best album we've done in something like 15 or 20 years".

The album debuted at number 83 on the German Albums Chart, becoming Pretty Maids' first album to chart in more than 10 years (since Anything Worth Doing Is Worth Overdoing in 1999). In their native Denmark, the album debuted at number 14 and became Pretty Maids' highest-charting album up to then.

"Little Drops of Heaven" was released as an official video on 14 April 2010, directed by Thomas Tjader, a digital single release followed on 16 April 2010.

== Critical reception ==
Professional ratings
Review scores
Source	Rating
Metal Forces	8.5/10
Metal Express Radio	8.5/10
Metal-Rules.com	4.5/5
Metal1.info	5/10
Sea of Tranquility	3/5 stars

Pandemonium received generally positive reviews from critics, although some reviewers were less enthusiastic. Neil Arnold of Metal Forces praised the album's consistency and described it as a "glorious record", highlighting the band's ability to combine heaviness with melodic songwriting.

Frank Jaeger of Metal Express Radio considered it an unexpectedly strong return, praising the arrangements and the opening tracks, particularly "I.N.V.U." and "Cielo Drive", although he felt the album lost some momentum towards its conclusion. JP of Metal-Rules.com similarly praised the album's combination of heaviness and melody, describing it as a potential career defining release and a strong contender for his top ten albums of the year.

In contrast, Thomas Meyns of Metal1.info criticised the inconsistency of the songwriting, arguing that the stronger tracks were undermined by several unremarkable compositions and overly commercial ballads. Richard Wheelhouse of Sea of Tranquility praised the tight performances, catchy hooks and crisp production, but felt that the band had not developed sufficiently from its established sound, describing the album as offering few surprises.

== Track listing ==
All tracks are written by Ronnie Atkins and Ken Hammer; except "Pandemonium" and "Final Day of Innocence" written by Atkins, Hammer and Morten Sandager.

No.	Title	Length
1.	"Pandemonium"	5:21
2.	"I.N.V.U."	4:57
3.	"Little Drops of Heaven"	4:37
4.	"One World One Truth"	4:19
5.	"Final Day of Innocence"	4:16
6.	"Cielo Drive"	3:53
7.	"It Comes at Night"	4:16
8.	"Old Enough to Know"	4:16
9.	"Beautiful Madness"	4:03
10.	"Breathless"	4:00
11.	"It Comes At Night" (remix)	5:46

Japanese version (bonus track)
No.	Title	Length
12.	"Ka-Ching"	3:19

== Personnel ==
- Ronnie Atkins – vocals
- Ken Hammer – guitars
- Kenn Jackson – bass
- Allan Tschicaja – drums
- Morten Sandager – keyboards, assistant engineer
- Jacob Hansen – producer, mixer, mastering, engineer, additional guitars
- Jeppe Andersson – assistant engineer
- Martin Pagaard Wolff – drum technician

== Charts ==
Chart (2010)	Peak position
Danish Albums (Hitlisten)	14
German Albums (Offizielle Top 100)	83
Swedish Albums (Sverigetopplistan)	45
Swiss Albums (Schweizer Hitparade)	63
