= Motherland (Pretty Maids album) =

Studio album by Pretty Maids
- Released: 22 March 2013
- Recorded: 2012–2013
- Studios: Hansen Studios (Ribe, Denmark)
- Genres: Hard rock, heavy metal
- Length: 52:06
- Label: Frontiers Records
- Producer: Jacob Hansen

Pretty Maids chronology
It Comes Alive - Maid in Switzerland (2012)	Motherland (2013)	Louder Than Ever (2014)

Singles from Motherland
- 1. "Mother of All Lies" Released: 22 January 2013; 2. "Sad to See You Suffer" Released: 5 March 2013

Motherland is the thirteenth studio album by the Danish hard rock and heavy metal band Pretty Maids. The album was released on 22 March 2013 in Europe and on 26 March 2013 in North America through Frontiers Records. It was produced by Jacob Hansen, who had previously collaborated with the band on their 2010 comeback effort, Pandemonium.

Frontman Ronnie Atkins described Motherland as one of the band's best ever, comparing it to their previous album he said it was "a bit more melancholic, moody and melodic." Andy Nathan from Get Ready to Rock agreed, saying it continued the musical trajectory established by its predecessor, combining a heavy, modern sonic landscape with the melodic hard rock sensibilities that defined the band's classic 1980s material.

== Background ==
The band started recording the album in mid August 2012, laying down basic tracks in the studio. However, the touring schedule got in the way so they started recording separately after that. Atkins said that there was no particular concept to the album, but lyrically it is about being patriotic and defending the values of their country. He felt the title Motherland was perfect.

Musically, the album features a heavy focus on the dual sonic interplay between Ken Hammer's chugging guitar riffs and Morten Sandager's prominent, 1980s-style synthesizer lines. It also features a contemporary-sounding production by Jacob Hansen, combining a hard-hitting melodic metal sound with catchy hooks and vocal harmonies.

== Release and promotion ==
The album was officially announced by Frontiers Records in late 2012. Prior to its issue, the band released the lead single "Mother of All Lies", accompanied by an official music video to anchor the album's promotional cycle.

Following the global release of the album in March 2013, Pretty Maids embarked on an extensive worldwide tour. This included prominent appearances at several major European metal festivals during the summer of 2013, such as Wacken Open Air and Bang Your Head!!!.

== Singles ==
Two singles were released from the album:

- "Mother of All Lies" released on 22 January 2013 as a digital single accompanied by an official music video.
- "Sad to See You Suffer" released on 5 March 2013 as a digital single.

== Critical reception ==
Professional ratings
Review scores
Source	Rating
Rock Hard	8/10
Times Leader	4/4 stars
Heavymetal.dk	7/10 stars
Metal1.info	7.5/10

Motherland received generally positive reviews from music critics. Jens Peters of Rock Hard awarded the album 8 out of 10, noting that the band had avoided major musical experimentation and remained faithful to its established sound, combining melodic metal and hard rock with elements of the heavier style that had characterised its 1980s material. He concluded that listeners who enjoyed its predecessor, Pandemonium, would not be disappointed.

Times Leader awarded the album four out of four stars, praising its aggressive sound, heavy riffs, melodic hooks and contemporary production, and describing the album as "Infernal and heavy, dark and infectious arena-ready metal."

Kasper Olsen of Heavymetal.dk gave it 7 out of 10, praising its catchy choruses, musicianship and atmospheric closing track "Wasted", although he felt that the album became less energetic and varied as it progressed. Marc Lengowski of Metal1.info awarded it 7.5 out of 10, regarding it as an enjoyable and polished melodic metal release, but expressing reservations about its formulaic songwriting and lack of lasting impact.

== Track Listing ==
All songs written by Ken Hammer and Ronnie Atkins, except where noted.

No.	Title	Writer(s)	Length
1.	"Mother of All Lies"		4:44
2.	"To Fool a Nation"		4:33
3.	"Confession"	Hammer, Morten Sandager, Atkins	1:40
4.	"The Iceman"	Hammer, Sandager, Atkins	3:56
5.	"Sad to See You Suffer"		4:41
6.	"Hooligan"		3:49
7.	"Infinity"		3:56
8.	"Why So Serious"		4:18
9.	"Motherland"	Allan Tschicaja, Hammer, Atkins	3:35
10.	"I See Ghosts"	Hammer, Rene Shades, Atkins	3:38
11.	"Bullet for You"		4:07
12.	"Who What Where When Why"		4:03
13.	"Wasted"	Hammer, Sandager, Atkins	5:07
Total length:			52:06

== Personnel ==
Adapted from the album's liner notes.

Pretty Maids

- Ronnie Atkins – lead vocals
- Ken Hammer – guitars
- Rene Shades – bass, additional Pro Tools engineering
- Morten Sandager – keyboards, additional Pro Tools engineering
- Allan Tschicaja – drums

Production

- Jacob Hansen – producer, recording, engineering, mixing
- Søren Andersen – additional recordings
- Kai Brockschmidt – cover artwork, package and booklet design
- Joakim Lenell – photography
- Thomas Tjaeder – photography

== Charts ==
Chart (2013)	Peak position
Denmark (Tracklisten)	13
Sweden (Sverigetopplistan)	22
Switzerland (Schweizer Hitparade)	29
Germany (Offizielle Top 100)	71
Belgium (Ultratop Wallonia)	115
