= Pretty Maids =

Danish hard rock/heavy metal band

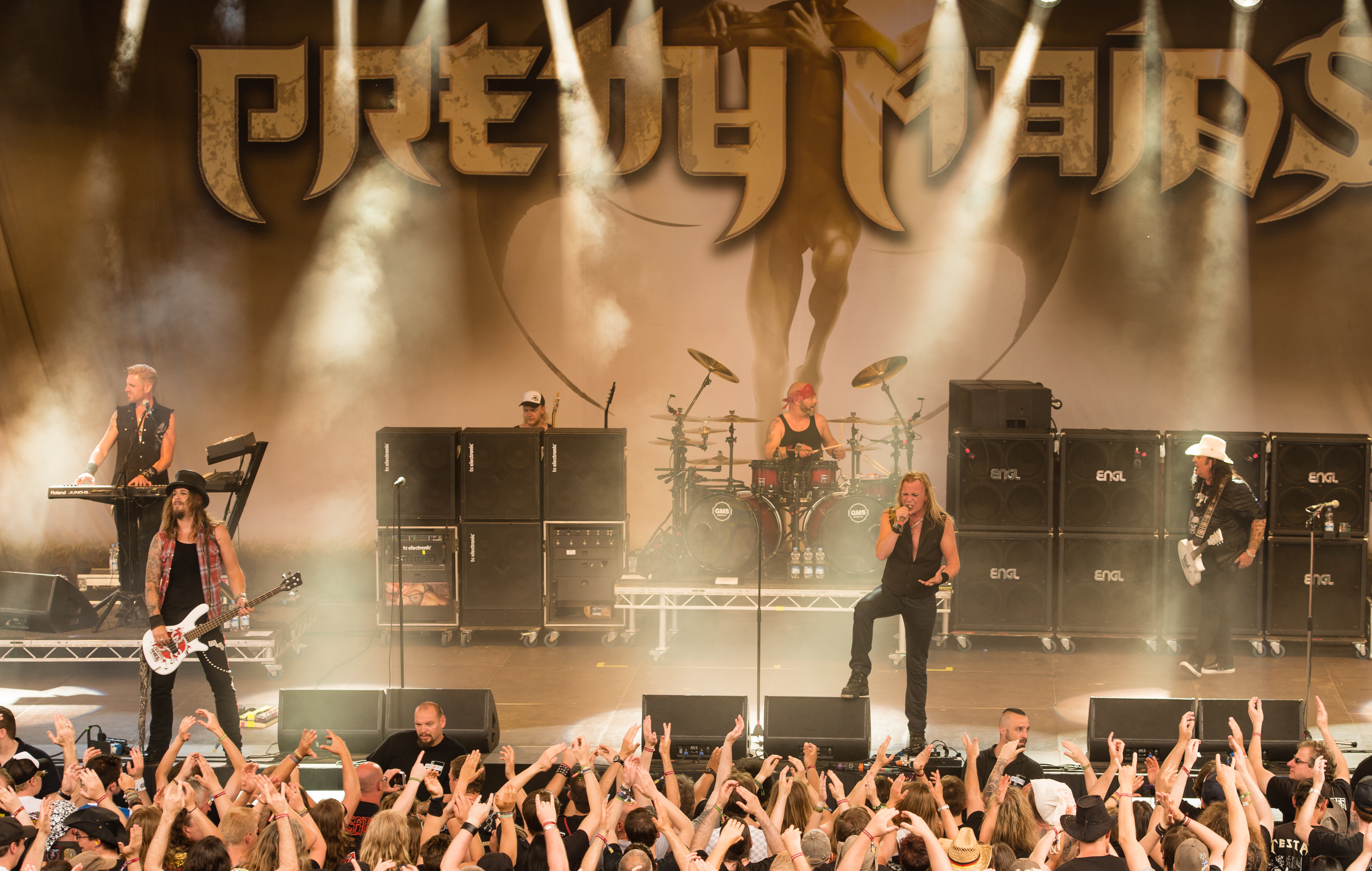

Background information
- Origin: Horsens, Denmark
- Genres: Heavy metal; hard rock
- Years active: 1981–present
- Label: Frontiers
- Members: Ronnie Atkins; Ken Hammer; Allan Tschicaja; Rene Shades; Chris Laney
- Past members: See former members here
- Website: prettymaids.dk

Pretty Maids is a Danish hard rock/heavy metal band from Horsens. They were formed in 1981 by Ken Hammer and completed with Ronnie Atkins in 1982.

The band have supported well known acts such as Black Sabbath, Whitesnake, Deep Purple, Alice Cooper, and Saxon, and were also featured at the 1987 German version of Monsters of Rock, where Deep Purple headlined.

After a prolonged international touring hiatus before the release of the 2006 Wake Up to the Real World album, the band have every year since been touring their primary markets of Denmark, Sweden, France, Germany and Japan.

== History ==
=== 1980s ===
Pretty Maids were formed in 1981 by friends Ken Hammer and John Jacobsen in Horsens, Denmark. According to a contemporary interview with Hammer, the Pretty Maids name had previously belonged to an earlier band of his (Pretty Maids Panic), and he retained it when assembling a new line-up. The group initially performed cover versions of songs by Thin Lizzy, Michael Schenker Group and Rainbow. Vocalist Ronnie Atkins subsequently joined after responding to an advertisement seeking a heavy metal vocalist. He travelled from Vejle to Horsens to audition, and joined after establishing a good musical rapport with the other members. Atkins and Hammer later began collaborating on original material, including the song "Children of Tomorrow". They self financed a demo with the tracks "City Light" and "Shelly the Maid" resulting in a deal with the English record label Bullet Records.

In 1983, the band released their debut self-titled EP under the name Pretty Maids, recognition was fuelled by their UK tour the same year. In 1984 they signed to CBS Records in Denmark, who remixed and re-released their self-titled EP with a different cover.

In 1984, the band released their debut studio album, Red Hot and Heavy, which was a success. The line-up featured two new members, former Shylock members Allan DeLong on bass and Rick Hanson on guitar. Hanson left the band and was briefly replaced by ex-Mercyful Fate guitarist Benny Petersen.

More acclaim followed with their second studio album, Future World, released in 1987. It was recorded in Bearsville Studios, New York, with producer Eddie Kramer. The collaboration did not work out and Flemming Rasmusen ended up producing the more hard rocking songs and Kevin Elson produced the more melodic tracks. Bonfire guitarist Angel Schleifer joined as touring guitarist in 1987-88.

=== 1990s ===
The 1990 follow up, Jump the Gun, with new guitarist Ricky Marx, was produced by Deep Purple bassist Roger Glover. The band more or less broke up after this record, leaving only founding members Ron Atkins and Ken Hammer.

They would not quit so recruited drummer Michael Fast and bassist Kenn Jackson, and went on to record Sin-Decade in 1992, once again teaming up with Metallica's producer Flemming Rasmussen. The album produced the single "Please Don't Leave Me" - a John Sykes cover.

=== 2000s ===
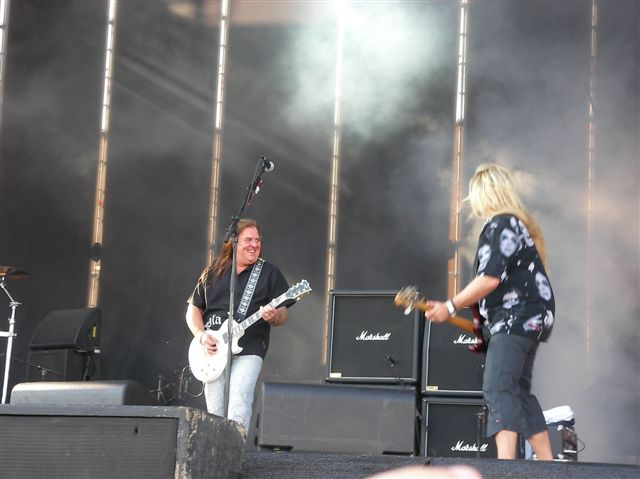
Pretty Maids in 2007

In September 2002, the band's management company Rock On went bankrupt, following what the band described as "very unwise business moves". This left Pretty Maids in a difficult financial situation and resulted in legal and copyright disputes.

On 6 December 2003, Hammer suffered a heart attack after a blood clot was discovered in his heart. He subsequently made a recovery, although the health problems contributed to the band's reduced activity over the following years.

As of July 2005, the drummer since 1991, Michael Fast, decided to leave before the recording of Wake Up to the Real World - an album that was originally intended to be released in 2005, but the initial recordings was postponed to the summer of 2006. In April 2006, new drummer Allan Tschicaja (Royal Hunt, Kingdom Come) was announced as Michael Fast's replacement. In 2006, Morten Sandager (ex-Mercenary) joined Pretty Maids, playing the keyboards.

=== 2010s ===
On 14 May 2010, Pretty Maids released Pandemonium, their first of five studio albums through the decade, all with Frontiers Records. Motherland followed on 22 March 2013, then Louder Than Ever on 21 March 2014 which consisted of re-recordings of eight previously released tracks along with four new songs. Kingmaker was released on 21 October 2016, and finally Undress Your Madness on 8 November 2019.

The 2010s brought several changes to Pretty Maids' line-up. The first came in April 2010, when the band announced that bassist Kenn Jackson was leaving. The following month, American bassist Hal Patino, formerly of King Diamond, was brought in as a temporary replacement. His tenure proved brief, however, and he announced his departure in April 2011.

The next change came in February 2016, when keyboardist Morten Sandager left the band. Later that year Chris Laney joined on a trial basis, playing both keyboards and guitar, before becoming a permanent member.

The line-up changed again in 2017, when drummer Allan Tschicaja announced his departure on 1 May. Explaining his decision, he said: "It’s been a difficult decision for me, but I want to focus more on family, friends and other projects." Just eight days later, Allan Sørensen was announced as his replacement. He made his live debut with the band that evening, when Pretty Maids opened for Kiss at Forum Horsens in Horsens, Denmark. In July 2019, following the departure of Allan Sørensen, Tschicaja returned to Pretty Maids, initially as a temporary replacement for the remaining summer festival dates.

Celebrating their 30th anniversary, Pretty Maids performed at Tivoli Gardens in Copenhagen on 22 April 2011, with René Shades making his live debut as the band's (then) temporary bassist.

On 15 September 2012, Pretty Maids performed in the United States for the first time, appearing at the ProgPower USA festival in Atlanta, Georgia.

On 9 July 2019, Pretty Maids announced that they had been forced to withdraw from their scheduled September appearance at ProgPower USA because the recent line-up change made it impossible to obtain the necessary visa in time.

=== 2020s ===
In March 2020, the band's lead singer and frontman Ronnie Atkins revealed that he had been diagnosed with lung cancer at the end of 2019. Despite initially being declared cancer-free following treatment, Atkins revealed in October 2020 that his cancer had returned and spread, resulting in a stage four diagnosis.

In 2021, Atkins released his debut solo album One Shot in lieu of touring or working in the studio with Pretty Maids, mainly for health and logistical reasons. Ken Hammer was also doing side projects around that time and in 2022 he released the album Taboo with H.E.R.O. vocalist Christoffer Stjerne.

In October 2021, two authorised books documenting the band's 40-year history were published. 40 år med Pretty Maids, written in Danish by Jan Eriksen, recounts the band's history through interviews with Ronnie Atkins and Ken Hammer. The English-language We Came To Rock – The Official Pretty Maids Journals, written by Ozzie Adenborg, draws on interviews with former and current band members, producers, managers, journalists and fans, alongside a chronicle of the band's history and concert appearances.

In June 2024, Pretty Maids returned to the stage after a five year break and performed a few shows including at Copenhell 2024 festival and the Time to Rock festival in Sweden.

== Legacy ==
Pretty Maids' song "Back to Back" from their debut studio album, Red, Hot and Heavy, was covered by the Swedish Power metal band HammerFall on their second studio album Legacy of Kings (1998) and by Swedish melodic death metal band Arch Enemy on their tenth studio album, Will to Power (2017).

== Band members ==
Current

- Ken Hammer — lead guitar, backing vocals (1981–present)
- Ronnie Atkins — lead vocals (1981–present)
- Rene Shades — bass, backing vocals (2011–present), rhythm guitar (2004, touring)
- Allan Tschicaja — drums (2006–2017, 2019–present)
- Chris Laney — keyboards, rhythm guitar (2016–present)

== Discography ==
Studio albums

- Red Hot and Heavy (1984)
- Future World (1987)
- Jump the Gun (1990)
- Sin-Decade (1992)
- Stripped (1993)
- Scream (1994)
- Spooked (1997)
- Anything Worth Doing Is Worth Overdoing (1999)
- Carpe Diem (2000)
- Planet Panic (2002)
- Wake Up to the Real World (2006)
- Pandemonium (2010)
- Motherland (2013)
- Louder Than Ever (2014)
- Kingmaker (2016)
- Undress Your Madness (2019)
