= One Shot (album) =

Studio album by Ronnie Atkins
- Released: 12 March 2021
- Studios: LaneyLand Studio, Stockholm, Sweden; Hansen Studios, Ribe, Denmark
- Genres: Hard rock, heavy metal
- Label: Frontiers
- Producer: Chris Laney

Ronnie Atkins chronology
One Shot (2021)	4 More Shots (The Acoustics) (2021)

Singles from One Shot
- 1. "Real" Released: 14 December 2020; 2. "One Shot" Released: 21 January 2021; 3. "Scorpio" Released: 18 February 2021

One Shot is debut solo studio album by Danish hard rock singer Ronnie Atkins. It was released on 12 March 2021 by Frontiers Records.

== Track listing ==
All tracks are written by Ronnie Atkins; except "Frequency of Love" written by Atkins and Chris Laney.

No.	Title	Length
1.	"Real"	3:58
2.	"Scorpio"	4:34
3.	"One Shot"	5:26
4.	"Subjugated"	3:50
5.	"Frequency of Love"	3:19
6.	"Before the Rise of an Empire"	3:29
7.	"Miles Away"	4:29
8.	"Picture Yourself"	4:12
9.	"I Prophesize"	3:30
10.	"One By One"	3:45
11.	"When Dreams Are Not Enough"	4:12

Japanese version — bonus track
No.	Title	Length
12.	"One Shot" (orchestral version)

== Personnel ==
- Ronnie Atkins – lead vocals, backing vocals
- Chris Laney – producer, arrangement, rhythm guitar, keyboards, backing vocals, acoustic guitar, lead guitar, solo guitar
- Jacob Hansen – mixer, mastering
- Allan Sørensen – drums
- Pontus Egberg – bass
- Morten Sandager – keyboards
- Anders Ringman – acoustic guitar
- Allan Sundberg – acoustic guitar
- Pontus Norgren – lead guitar, solo guitar
- Kee Marcello – lead guitar, solo guitar
- Oliver Hartmann – lead guitar, solo guitar, additional backing vocals
- John Berg – lead guitar, solo guitar
- Jan Gripstedt – lead guitar, solo guitar
- Allan Sundberg – lead guitar, solo guitar
- Linnea Vikström Egg – additional backing vocals
- Björn Strid – additional backing vocals

== Charts ==
Chart (2021)	Peak position
Danish Albums (Hitlisten)	15
German Albums (Offizielle Top 100)	19
Swedish Albums (Sverigetopplistan)	32
Swiss Albums (Schweizer Hitparade)	8
