= Red Hot and Heavy =

Red, Hot and Heavy

Studio album by Pretty Maids
- Released: 29 October 1984
- Recorded: July and August 1984
- Studios: Puk (Gjerlev, Denmark)
- Genres: Hard rock, heavy metal
- Length: 36:17
- Label: CBS
- Producers: Billy Cross, Tommy Hansen

Pretty Maids chronology
Red, Hot and Heavy (1984)	Future World (1987)

Singles from Red, Hot and Heavy
- 1. "Waitin' for the Time" Released: 1984; 2. "Red, Hot and Heavy" Released: 1985

Red, Hot and Heavy is the debut studio album by the Danish hard rock/heavy metal band Pretty Maids, released on 29 October 1984 by CBS Records. It is the only Pretty Maids album to feature Rick Hanson (ex-Shylock, later in Pentagon and Cold Drop). After the album's release, Hansen was briefly replaced by early Mercyful Fate guitarist Benny Petersen, who moved on to start the band Jackal, which released four albums.

The song "Night Danger" was used on the soundtrack for the horror film Demons (1985), directed by Lamberto Bava. In 2005, Red, Hot and Heavy was ranked at No. 437 in Rock Hard magazine's The 500 Greatest Rock & Metal Albums of All Time.

== Critical reception ==
Professional ratings
Review scores
Source	Rating
AllMusic	4.5/5 stars
Hit Parader	3/5 stars
Rock Hard	9/10
metal.de	9/10

Red, Hot and Heavy received generally positive reviews from critics. AllMusic awarded the album four and a half stars out of five, while German magazine Rock Hard gave it 9 out of 10, in a review by Uwe Lerch.

In a contemporary review published in July 1985, Hit Parader awarded the album three out of five stars. Reviewer Andy Secher praised the energy of guitarists Rick Hanson and Ken Hammer, while comparing aspects of the band's sound to the Scorpions and Deep Purple. The Danish magazine Hot Rockin' reviewed the album in November 1984, describing it as a very fine record and praising its quality and finesse. The review also highlighted the musicianship and guitar work of Ken Hammer and Rick Hanson.

In a retrospective review published in 2025, metal.de also awarded the album 9 out of 10, describing it as an early creative peak for the band and praising its energetic performances, strong songwriting and memorable choruses.

== Track listing ==
No.	Title	Lyrics	Music	Length
1.	"Fortuna Imperatrix Mundi (Carmina Burana)"		Carl Orff	0:22
2.	"Back to Back"	Ronnie Atkins	Ken Hammer, Alan Owen	3:34
3.	"Red, Hot and Heavy"	Atkins	Hammer	3:58
4.	"Waitin' for the Time"	Atkins	Hammer	4:45
5.	"Cold Killer"	Atkins	Hammer	4:42
6.	"Battle of Pride"	Atkins	Hammer	3:14
7.	"Night Danger"	Atkins	Hammer, Owen	3:52
8.	"A Place in the Night"	Atkins	Hammer, Owen	3:58
9.	"Queen of Dreams"	Atkins	Hammer	4:45
10.	"Little Darling"	Phil Lynott	Lynott	2:59

== Personnel ==
Pretty Maids

- Ronnie Atkins – vocals
- Ken Hammer – lead, rhythm and acoustic guitars
- Rick Hanson – lead and rhythm guitars
- Allan Delong – bass
- Phil Moorhead – drums
- Alan Owen – keyboards

Guest musicians

- Billy Cross – lead guitar (track 10), lead introduction (track 8)
- Tommy Hansen – organs (track 10)
- Knud Lindhard – backing vocals (tracks 4, 5, 8, 10)

Other staff

- Billy Cross – producer
- Tommy Hansen – producer, Fairlight CMI programming
