= Sin-Decade =

Studio album by Pretty Maids
- Released: 21 February 1992
- Recorded: July–September 1991 at Sweet Silence Studios, Copenhagen; Studio 1, Horsens
- Genres: Hard rock, heavy metal
- Label: Columbia
- Producers: Flemming Rasmussen, Pretty Maids

Pretty Maids chronology
Jump the Gun (1990)	Sin-Decade (1992)	Stripped (1993)

Singles from Sin-Decade
- 1. "Please Don't Leave Me" Released: 11 July 1992

Sin-Decade is the fourth studio album by the Danish hard rock/heavy metal band Pretty Maids. It was produced by Flemming Rasmussen and Pretty Maids, and released on 21 February 1992 by Columbia Records.

After the relative commercial failure of the band's previous album, Jump the Gun (1990), the bass guitarist Allan Delong, the keyboard player Alan Owen and the drummer Phil More left the group by late 1990, leaving only the singer Ronnie Atkins and the guitarist Ken Hammer. The two remaining members began writing songs for a new album, this time with "full creative control" according to Atkins. Due to the tumultuous situation around the band, Atkins and Hammer wrote "aggressive and heavy" songs. According to Atkins, the band decided to work with the Danish producer Flemming Rasmussen to avoid the "over-produced" sound of Jump the Gun. To complete the band's line-up, Atkins and Hammer recruited drummer Michael Fast and bass guitar player Kenn Jackson.

The album includes the single "Please Don't Leave Me", a cover version of the John Sykes song. It was released on 11 July 1992, and reached number 10 in the Danish charts. The song has become Pretty Maids' signature song. It was later re-recorded in an acoustic version for the band's fifth studio album, Stripped (1993).

== Critical reception ==
Professional ratings
Review scores
Source	Rating
metal.de	6/10
Metallized	82/100

Reviewing the album retrospectively for metal.de in 2015, Eckart Maronde described Sin-Decade as a new beginning for Pretty Maids following the departure of several band members. He considered the album heavier and more forceful than its predecessor, Jump the Gun, but felt that it lacked any outstanding songs. In a review for Aux Portes du Métal, Blaster of Muppets similarly regarded the album as a step in the right direction, praising its more energetic sound and powerful production. He singled out the title track as a potential new band classic, while describing "Running Out" and "Raise Your Flag" as highlights. However, he was less enthusiastic about the ballads, particularly the cover of Thin Lizzy's "Please Don't Leave Me". Reviewing the album for Metallized, Michael Rosenberg awarded it 82/100, describing it as a solid record without significant weak points. He praised its return to a heavier sound and considered it an important chapter in the band's career.

== Track listing ==
All lyrics are written by Ronnie Atkins and Ken Hammer, except "Please Don't Leave Me" written by Phil Lynott and John Sykes.

No.	Title	Length
1.	"Running Out"	3:59
2.	"Who Said Money"	3:42
3.	"Nightmare in the Neighbourhood"	4:56
4.	"Sin-Decade"	4:32
5.	"Come on Tough, Come on Nasty"	3:11
6.	"Raise Your Flag"	3:47
7.	"Credit Card Lover"	4:04
8.	"Know It Ain't Easy"	4:03
9.	"Healing Touch"	4:01
10.	"In the Flesh"	3:23
11.	"Please Don't Leave Me" (John Sykes cover)	5:15

== Personnel ==
- Ronnie Atkins - lead vocals
- Ken Hammer - lead guitar
- Michael Fast - drums
- Kenn Jackson - bass guitar
- Alan Owen - keyboards
- Dominic Gale - keyboards

Additional musician

- Knud Lindhard - backing vocals

== Charts ==
Chart performance for Sin-Decade
Chart (1992)	Peak position
Germany Albums (Offizielle Top 100)	62
Sweden Albums (Sverigetopplistan)	50
