= Future World (Pretty Maids album) =

Studio album by Pretty Maids
- Released: 20 April 1987
- Recorded: October 1986 – February 1987 at Bearsville Studios, Bearsville, New York, United States; Easy Sound Studio, Copenhagen, Denmark
- Genres: Heavy metal, power metal, glam metal
- Length: 41:04
- Label: CBS
- Producers: Eddie Kramer, Chris Isca

Pretty Maids chronology
Red Hot and Heavy (1984)	Future World (1987)	Jump the Gun (1990)

Singles from Future World
- 1. "Love Games" Released: 1987; 2. "Future World" Released: 1987

Future World is the second album by the Danish hard rock/heavy metal band Pretty Maids, released by CBS on 20 April 1987. By 1990, it had sold 300,000 copies worldwide.

The album reached number 22 on the Swedish charts, number 57 on the German charts, and number 165 on the US Billboard 200.

== Background and recording ==
Pretty Maids wanted an American or British producer for their second studio album and selected Eddie Kramer, having been impressed by his work on American hard rock band Icon's The Night of the Crime (1985). Kramer was subsequently dismissed by the record company during the sessions. Vocalist Ronnie Atkins joked about Kramer falling asleep at the mixing desk, then went on to recall that the recording had taken considerably longer than anticipated, with the band spending approximately four months in the United States rather than the planned six weeks. He attributed Kramer's departure to the increasing duration and expense of the sessions.

Atkins later recalled that CBS hoped Pretty Maids would become 'the next Europe', regarding the band as a potential major Scandinavian act in the American market. He attributed the album's commercial ambitions partly to the popularity of melodic rock at the time of its release in 1987. Mixing duties on the album were shared between Flemming Rasmussen, Kevin Elson and Chris Isca.

The album was recorded at Bearsville Studios in Woodstock, New York, between October 1986 and February 1987, with additional recording at Easy Sound Studio in Copenhagen. Engineer Chris Isca also worked on the production and received a co-producer credit. Isca mixed “Eye of the Storm”, while Flemming Rasmussen and Kevin Elson shared mixing duties on the remaining tracks.

Angel Schleifer of the German band Bonfire joined Pretty Maids for the 1987-88 tour but did not play on the album.

== Critical reception ==
Professional ratings
Review scores
Source	Rating
AllMusic	3/5 stars
Crash	4–5/6
Music Waves	4/5
Rock Hard	Klassiker

Future World received generally favourable reviews from music critics. James Christopher Monger of AllMusic praised the title track's guitar riff, driving rhythm section and Ronnie Atkins' vocals, as well as Alan Owen's keyboard contributions. He considered the ballads "Love Games" and "Eye of the Storm" more effective than comparable material by contemporary melodic rock bands. However, he criticised "We Came to Rock", describing it as a diluted imitation of Dio's "We Rock", and noted the band's tendency towards clichéd rock lyrics.

In a contemporary review for the German magazine Crash in September 1987, Frank Trojan praised the album's production and highlighted "Future World", "Yellow Rain", "Rodeo", "Needles in the Dark" and "Love Games". However, he felt that "We Came to Rock" and some of the other songs did not reach the same standard. He awarded the album a rating of 4–5 out of 6.

In February 2005, German heavy metal magazine Rock Hard featured Future World in its "Klassiker" (Classics) category, designating the album as a classic. They said the album was "A simply perfect, powerful, timelessly thunderous Euro-power metal album from first to last song."

Reviewing the album retrospectively for Music Waves in August 2010, LOLOCELTIC awarded it four out of five. The reviewer praised the band's musical development and more mature sound, highlighting the prominent keyboards of Alan Owen, Ken Hammer's guitar work and Ronnie Atkins' vocal performance. The review also commended the album's stylistic diversity, particularly the contrast between melodic hard rock and faster heavy metal, and described Future World as a cult album with a distinctive identity combining power, melody and memorable choruses.

== Track listing ==
All tracks written and arranged by Ronnie Atkins and Ken Hammer.

No.	Title	Length
1.	"Future World"	5:24
2.	"Loud 'n' Proud"	3:51
3.	"Love Games"	4:14
4.	"Yellow Rain"	5:28
5.	"Rodeo"	4:14
6.	"We Came to Rock"	4:30
7.	"Needles in the Dark"	5:02
8.	"Eye of the Storm""	4:55
9.	"Long Way to Go"	3:26

== Personnel ==
Adapted from the album's liner notes.

=== Pretty Maids ===
- Ronnie Atkins – lead & backing vocals
- Ken Hammer – guitars
- Allan Delong – bass guitar
- Phil Moorhead – drums
- Alan Owen – keyboards

=== Guest musicians ===
- Graham Bonnet - backing vocals (tracks 2, 6)
- Philip Hart - backing vocals (tracks 2, 3, 5, 6)

=== Other staff ===
- Eddie Kramer - producer, engineer
- Aaron Hurwitz - engineer
- Chris Isca - mixer (tracks 8), engineer, co-producer
- George Cowan - engineer
- Ken Lonas - engineer
- Thom Cadley - engineer
- Tommy Hansen - additional recordings
- Morten Henningsen - additional recordings assistant
- Flemming Rasmussen - mixer (tracks 1, 2, 4, 5, 7)
- Kevin Elson - mixer (tracks: 3, 6, 7)
- Frank Birch - assistant mixer (tracks 1, 2, 4, 5, 7)
- Wally Buck - assistant mixer (tracks 3, 6, 9)
- Bob Ludwig - mastering
- Joe Petagno - cover art

== Charts ==
Weekly chart performance for Future World
Chart (1987)	Peak position
German Albums (Offizielle Deutsche Charts)	57
Swedish Albums (Sverigetopplistan)	22
Eurochart Top 100 Albums	59
US Billboard 200	165
