= Jump the Gun (album) =

Studio album by Pretty Maids
- Released: 20 April 1990
- Recorded: Puk Studio, Denmark, 1990
- Genres: Hard rock, heavy metal, glam metal
- Length: 47:29
- Label: CBS
- Producer: Roger Glover

Pretty Maids chronology
Future World (1987)	Jump the Gun (1990)	Sin-Decade (1991)

Singles from Jump the Gun
- 1. "Young Blood" Released: 1990; 2. "Savage Heart" Released: 1990

Jump the Gun is the third studio album by the Danish hard rock/heavy metal band Pretty Maids. It was released on 20 April 1990 in Europe by CBS. In the US, the title was changed to Lethal Heroes and it was released by Epic Records. The album was produced by Deep Purple's bass guitarist Roger Glover. According to CBS, it was then the most expensive album recording to date in Denmark, with a cost of around DKK 3–3.5 million. Jump the Gun was nominated for Danish Heavy Rock Album of the Year at the 1991 Danish Grammy Awards, but lost to Skagarack's A Slice of Heaven.

Due to the underwhelming commercial performance of Jump the Gun, three members (including new guitarist Ricky Marx) left the band by late 1990 leaving only the lead singer Ronnie Atkins and the guitarist Ken Hammer. The band has said on numerous occasions that the decision to hire Glover as the album's producer was a mistake and led to its over-produced sound. In 2014, Atkins called the album his least favourite.

"Hang Tough" is a song that was written and recorded for Icon's Night of the Crime album but was not included in the final release. Icon's version is only available on the 1984: Live Bootleg CD and DVD.

== Critical reception ==
Professional ratings
Review scores
Source	Rating
metal.de	7/10
Metal Music Archives	3.5/5

The album received favourable retrospective assessments. Writing for Rock Hard Greece in 2020, Theodoros Miniatis described Jump the Gun as a worthy successor to Future World, praising the consistency of the band's musical style and the quality of its songwriting. He highlighted the energetic performances, hard rock riffs, catchy choruses, guitar melodies and keyboards, singling out "Rock the House" and "Attention" among the faster songs and "Savage Heart" for its atmospheric qualities. Miniatis considered the album one of Pretty Maids' most representative releases, despite its disappointing sales.

Reviewing the Original Album Classics collection for Metal.de in 2015, Eckart Maronde awarded Jump the Gun 7/10. He praised "Lethal Heroes", "Don't Settle for Less", "Savage Heart" and the title track, although he noted that the album's heavily produced sound had attracted criticism. Maronde also discussed its commercial failure in the United States, attributing this partly to the changing musical climate during the rise of grunge.

Time Signature of Metal Music Archives rated the album 3.5 out of 5 in 2011, describing it as an underrated example of melodic heavy metal. The review praised its powerful guitar riffs, memorable choruses and guitar solos, highlighting "Lethal Heroes", "Rock the House", "Headlines" and "Attention". However, the reviewer considered the synthesiser sound dated, albeit nostalgically appealing, and felt that the final three tracks were weaker than the rest of the album.

== Track listing ==
All music is composed by Ronnie Atkins and Ken Hammer, except "Hang Tough" written by Dan Wexler.

No.	Title	Length
1.	"Lethal Heroes"	3:54
2.	"Don't Settle for Less"	4:03
3.	"Rock the House"	3:23
4.	"Savage Heart"	4:39
5.	"Young Blood"	4:31
6.	"Headlines"	3:53
7.	"Jump the Gun"	3:49
8.	"Partners in Crime"	3:43
9.	"Attention"	4:00
10.	"Hang Tough" (Icon cover)	3:08
11.	"Over and Out"	3:58
12.	"Dream On"	4:28

== Personnel ==
- Ronnie Atkins - lead vocals
- Ken Hammer - lead guitar
- Ricky Marx - guitar
- Phil Moorhead - drums
- Allan Delong - bass guitar
- Alan Owen - keyboards

Additional musicians

- Ian Paice - drums on "Young Blood"
- Roger Glover - bass guitar on "Dream On"
- Ivan Pedersen - backing vocals
- Knud Linhard - backing vocals
- Freddy George Jensen - harp on "Dream On"
- The New Jersey Mass Choir appears on "Savage Heart"

== Charts ==
Chart performance for Jump the Gun
Chart (1990)	Peak position
German Albums (Offizielle Deutsche Charts)	35
Swedish Albums (Sverigetopplistan)	39
Switzerland Albums (Schweizer Hitparade)	20
Eurochart Top 100 Albums	71
