= Ronnie Atkins =

Danish singer

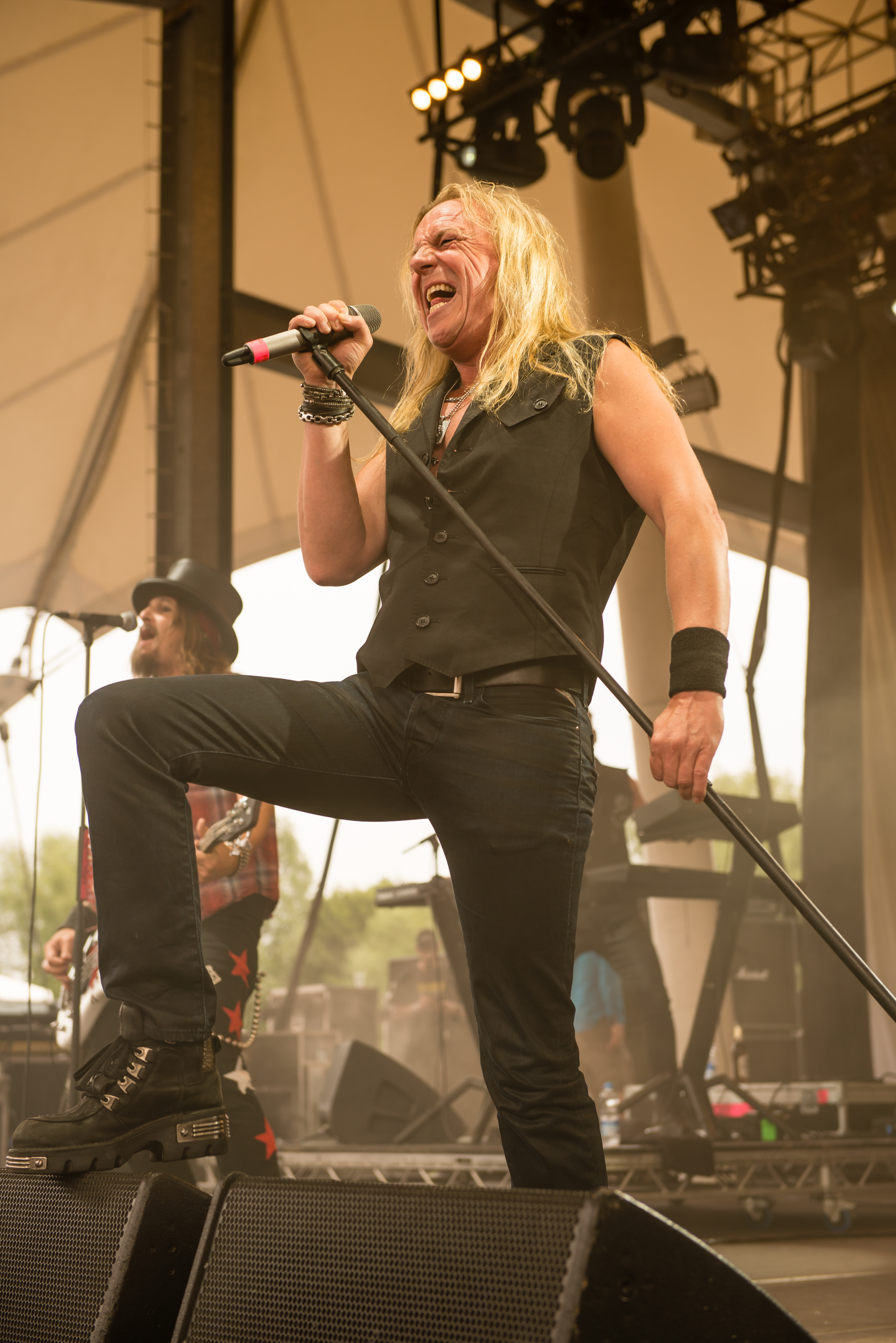
- Atkins performing in 2014

Background information
- Born: Paul Christensen; 16 November 1964 (age 61)
- Genres: Hard rock; heavy metal
- Occupations: Singer; songwriter
- Label: Frontiers
- Member of: Pretty Maids; Nordic Union; Avantasia

Ronnie Atkins (born Paul Christensen on 16 November 1964) is a Danish singer, best known as the co-founder, lead vocalist and primary songwriter for heavy metal band Pretty Maids. Atkins co-founded Pretty Maids in Horsens, Denmark in 1981 with guitarist Ken Hammer. Pretty Maids has released sixteen studio albums, four live albums and four extended plays.

He released his first solo album, One Shot, in 2021, followed by his second album, Make It Count, in 2022.

== Discography ==
Studio albums

- One Shot (2021)
- Make It Count (2022)
- Trinity (2023)

Extended plays

- 4 More Shots (2021)
- Symphomaniac (2022)

Nordic Union

- Nordic Union (2016)
- Second Coming (2018)
- Animalistic (2022)

Avantasia

- The Mystery of Time (2013), guest on Invoke The Machine
- Ghostlights (2016), guest on Let the Storm Descend Upon You, Unchain the Light and Wake up to the Moon
- Moonglow (2019), guest on Book of Shallows, Starlight and The Piper at the Gates of Dawn
- A Paranormal Evening with the Moonflower Society (2022), guest on Paper Plane
- Here Be Dragons (2025), guest on Phantasmagoria

== Health ==
Atkins has been diagnosed with and treating lung cancer since August 2019.
