= Rhapsody of Fire discography =

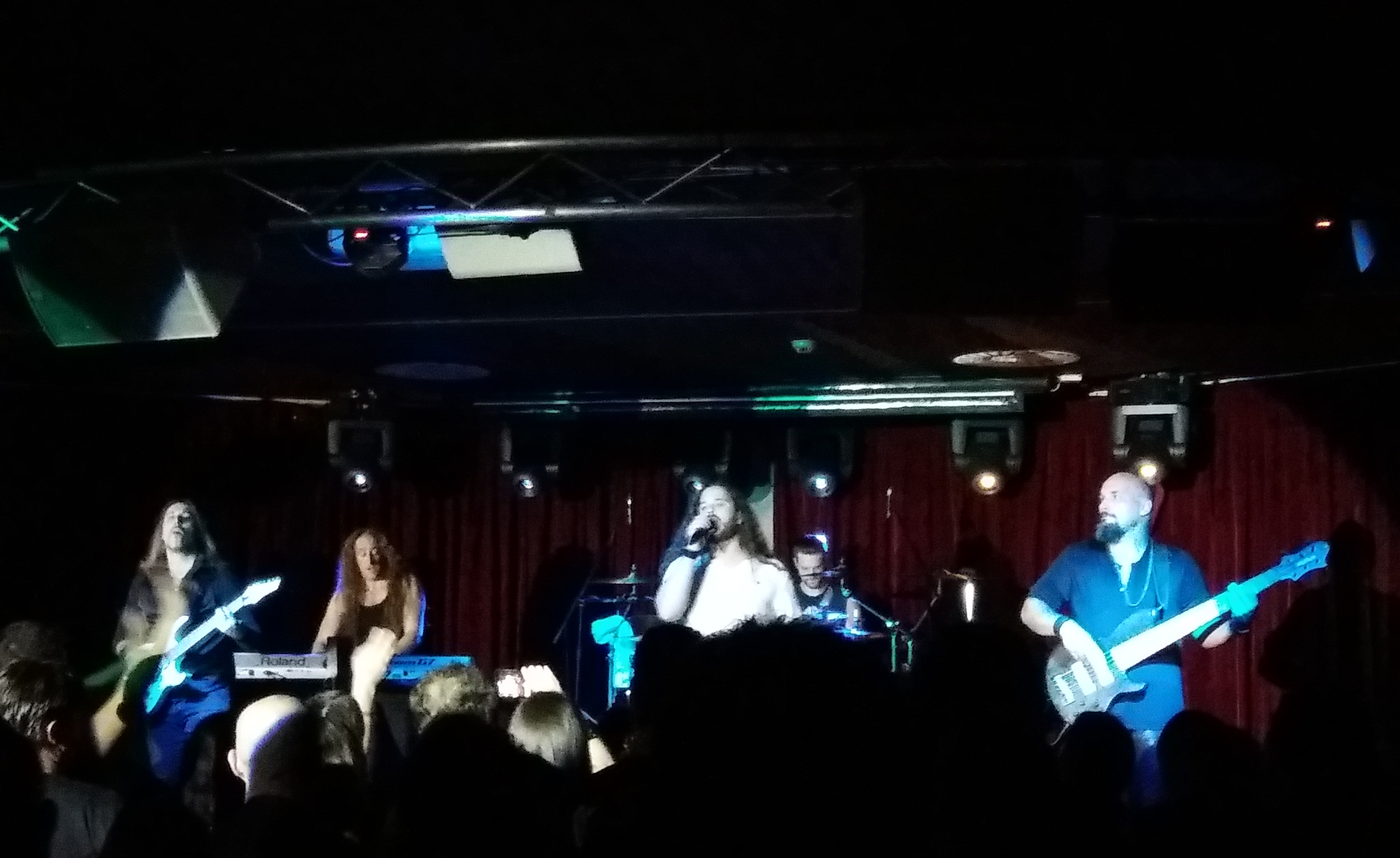
- Studio albums: 14
- Extended plays: 3
- Live albums: 2
- Compilation albums: 1
- Singles: 20
- Music videos: 10
- Demos: 2

This is the discography of Rhapsody of Fire, an Italian symphonic power metal band. It includes fourteen studio albums, three EPs, and various other media. Founded in 1993 in Trieste, the band originally released albums under the name Thundercross, but used the name Rhapsody from 1995 to July 2006. In 2006, they changed their name into Rhapsody of Fire.

== Studio albums ==
Year	Name	Label	ITA	AUT	BEL	CAN	CH	ESP	FIN	FRA	GER	GRE	JAP	NL	SWE	SWI
1997	Legendary Tales	Limb Music Products	-	-	-	-	-	-	-	-	-	-	52	-	-	-
1998	Symphony of Enchanted Lands	Limb Music Products	66	-	-	-	-	-	-	-	54	-	24	-	-	-
2000	Dawn of Victory	Limb Music Products	-	-	-	-	-	-	39	56	32	-	24	-	54	-
2001	Rain of a Thousand Flames	Limb Music Products	-	-	-	-	-	-	-	117	-	-	-	-	-	-
2002	Power of the Dragonflame	Limb Music Products	15	-	-	-	-	-	31	34	30	-	42	-	29	-
2004	Symphony of Enchanted Lands II – The Dark Secret	Magic Circle Music	-	-	-	-	62	-	-	27	33	-	40	70	-	62
2006	Triumph or Agony	Magic Circle Music	18	-	-	-	74	-	-	59	64	-	40	-	-	74
2010	The Frozen Tears of Angels	Nuclear Blast	31	58	96	129	39	81	35	51	33	11	41	-	53	39
2011	From Chaos to Eternity	Nuclear Blast	58	-	100	-	48	-	-	81	56	-	65	-	-	48
2013	Dark Wings of Steel	AFM Records	-	-	-	-	-	-	-	-	-	-	125	-	-	-
2016	Into the Legend	AFM Records	76	-	145	-	34	-	-	157	47	-	78	-	-	34
2019	The Eighth Mountain	AFM Records	88	-	148	-	25	-	-	185	22	-	-	-	-	-
2021	Glory for Salvation	AFM Records	-	-	-	-	-	-	-	-	89	-	-	-	-	31
2024	Challenge the Wind	AFM Records	-	-	-	-	-	-	-	-	-	-	-	-	-	36

== EPs ==
Year	Name	Label
2004	The Dark Secret	Magic Circle Music
2010	The Cold Embrace of Fear – A Dark Romantic Symphony	Nuclear Blast
2021	I'll Be Your Hero	AFM Records

== Singles ==
Year	Name	Label
1998	"Emerald Sword"	Limb Music Products
2000	"Holy Thunderforce"	Limb Music Products
2004	"Unholy Warcry"	Magic Circle Music
2005	"The Magic of the Wizard's Dream"	Steamhammer Records
2006	"A New Saga Begins"	Magic Circle Music
2010	"Reign of Terror"	Nuclear Blast
2010	"Sea of Fate"	Nuclear Blast
2011	"Aeons of Raging Darkness"	Nuclear Blast
2015	"Shining Star"	AFM Records
2017	"When Demons Awake"	AFM Records
2017	"Land of Immortals"	AFM Records
2017	"Knightrider of Doom"	AFM Records
2018	"The Legend Goes On"	AFM Records
2019	"Rain of Fury"	AFM Records
2019	"Master of Peace"	AFM Records
2021	"I'll Be Your Hero"	AFM Records
2021	"Glory for Salvation"	AFM Records
2021	"Magic Signs"	AFM Records
2021	"Terial the Hawk"	AFM Records
2021	"Chains of Destiny"	AFM Records
2023	"Kreel's Magic Staff"	AFM Records
2024	"Challenge the Wind"	AFM Records
2024	"A Brave New Hope"	AFM Records
2024	"Diamond Claws"	AFM Records
2024	"Mastered by the Dark"	AFM Records

== Live albums ==
Year	Name	Label	Type
2006	Live in Canada 2005: The Dark Secret	Magic Circle Music	Live
2013	Live – From Chaos to Eternity	AFM Records	Live

== Compilations ==
Year	Name	Label	Type
2004	Tales from the Emerald Sword Saga	Limb Music Products	Compilation
2017	Legendary Years	AFM Records	Compilation

== Demos ==
Year	Name	Label	Type	Notes
1994	Land of Immortals	—N/a	Demo	4 tracks
1995	Eternal Glory	Limb Music Products	Demo	7 tracks

== Videos/DVDs ==
Year	Name	Label	Type
2007	Visions from the Enchanted Lands	Magic Circle Music	Live

== Music videos ==
- "Emerald Sword" (1998)
- "Wisdom of the Kings" (2000)
- "Holy Thunderforce" (2001)
- "Rain of a Thousand Flames" (2001)
- "Power of the Dragonflame" (2002)
- "Unholy Warcry" (2004)
- "The Magic of the Wizard's Dream" (2006)
- "Sea of Fate" (2010)
- "Dark Wings of Steel" (2014)
- "Into the Legend" (2015)
- "Rain of Fury" (2019)
- "Chains of Destiny" (2021)
- "Un'ode per l'eroe" (2021)
- "Magic Signs" (2022)
- "Challenge the Wind" (2024)
- "Diamond Claws" (2024)
