= Legendary Years =

Studio album of re-recorded songs by Rhapsody of Fire
- Released: 26 May 2017
- Recorded: November 2016–February 2017
- Studios: Echoes Studio (Trieste); Zolfo Studio (Udine); Greenman Studios (Arnsberg); Audiofloor (Arnsberg)
- Genre: Symphonic power metal
- Length: 73:36
- Label: AFM Records
- Producer: Alex Staropoli

Rhapsody of Fire compilation album chronology
Tales from the Emerald Sword Saga (2004)	Legendary Years (2017)

Singles from Legendary Years
- 1. "When Demons Awake" Released: 28 April 2017; 2. "Land of Immortals" Released: 12 May 2017; 3. "Knightrider of Doom" Released: 19 May 2017

Professional ratings
Review scores
Source	Rating
Metal Hammer	3/5 stars

Legendary Years is a studio album by the Italian symphonic power metal band Rhapsody of Fire, consisting of re-recorded songs from The Emerald Sword Saga, a five concept albums-long story started in their first album Legendary Tales in 1997 and concluded in Power of the Dragonflame in 2002.

It is their first work with singer Giacomo Voli and drummer Manu Lotter, replacing longtime members Fabio Lione and Alex Holzwarth respectively. It also marks the band's first album (and first record since 1995) not to feature Lione, and the first without Holzwarth since their 1998 studio album Symphony of Enchanted Lands.

== Track listing ==
All lyrics are written by Luca Turilli; all music is composed by Turilli and Alex Staropoli.

No.	Title	Original album	Length
1.	"Dawn of Victory"	Dawn of Victory	4:44
2.	"Knightrider of Doom"	Power of the Dragonflame	3:58
3.	"Flames of Revenge"	Legendary Tales	5:32
4.	"Beyond the Gates of Infinity"	Symphony of Enchanted Lands	7:21
5.	"Land of Immortals"	Legendary Tales	4:53
6.	"Emerald Sword"	Symphony of Enchanted Lands	4:23
7.	"Legendary Tales"	Legendary Tales	7:49
8.	"Dargor, Shadowlord of the Black Mountain"	Dawn of Victory	4:47
9.	"When Demons Awake"	Power of the Dragonflame	6:46
10.	"Wings of Destiny"	Symphony of Enchanted Lands	4:17
11.	"Riding the Winds of Eternity"	Symphony of Enchanted Lands	4:12
12.	"The Dark Tower of Abyss"	Symphony of Enchanted Lands	6:51
13.	"Holy Thunderforce"	Dawn of Victory	4:20
14.	"Rain of a Thousand Flames"	Rain of a Thousand Flames	3:43
Total length:			73:36

Japanese bonus track
No.	Title	Original album	Length
15.	"Where Dragons Fly"	Emerald Sword (Single)	4:34
Total length:			78:10

== Personnel ==
All information from the album booklet.

Rhapsody of Fire

- Alex Staropoli – keyboards, production, engineering, editing
- Roberto De Micheli – guitars
- Alessandro Sala – bass
- Giacomo Voli – lead vocals, choir vocals, conductor (choir)
- Manu Lotter – drums

Additional musicians

- Manuel Staropoli – baroque recorder, baroque oboe, flute
- Massimo Marchese – lute
- Teodora Tommasi – celtic harp
- Elisa Frausin – cello
- Elisa Verzier – vocals (alto)
- Riccardo Rados – vocals (tenor)
- Hao Wang – vocals (bass)
- Matjaž Zobec – vocals (bass)
- Paola Marra – vocals (soprano)
- Galateia Mastichidou – vocals (soprano)

Choir

- Paolo Ribaldini, Davide Moras, Fabio Sambenini, Gabriele Gozzi, Alex Mari, Marco Sandron

Production

- Sebastian "Seeb" Levermann – engineering, editing, mixing, mastering, recording
- Massimo Goina – photography
- Paul Thureau – layout
- Luca Balboa – conductor
- Alexandre Charleux – cover art
