= The Magic of the Wizard's Dream =

Single by Rhapsody featuring Christopher Lee

from the album Symphony of Enchanted Lands II: The Dark Secret
- Released: March 29, 2005
- Recorded: 2004–2005
- Length: 4:26 (Album version); 3:42 (Duet version)
- Label: Steamhammer Records
- Songwriters: Luca Turilli, Alex Staropoli
- Producer: Joey DeMaio

Rhapsody singles chronology
"Holy Thunderforce" (2000)	"The Magic of the Wizard's Dream" (2005)	"Reign of Terror" (2010)

"The Magic of the Wizard's Dream" is the third single recorded by the Italian symphonic power metal band Rhapsody, released in 2005.

The title track was originally part of their 2004 album Symphony of Enchanted Lands II: The Dark Secret and is reproposed here in basically two versions: one with a slightly faster tempo and the album one. The faster version is sung by Fabio Lione, with actor and singer Christopher Lee as a guest, in four different languages (English, Italian, French and German) plus an orchestral mix of the English one.

Other songs include "Autumn Twilight", a fast-paced track, and "Lo Specchio d'Argento" ("The Silver Mirror") a power ballad with Italian lyrics.

== Background ==
Rhapsody re-recorded "The Magic of the Wizard's Dream", after Christopher Lee expressed interest in singing with them. Lee, who had become famous for his appearances in the Star Wars and Lord of the Rings films, also narrates the album Enchanted Lands II.

== Track listing ==
No.	Title	Length
1.	"The Magic of the Wizard's Dream (English version)"	3:42
2.	"The Magic of the Wizard's Dream (Italian version)"	3:41
3.	"The Magic of the Wizard's Dream (French version)"	3:42
4.	"The Magic of the Wizard's Dream (German version)"	3:43
5.	"The Magic of the Wizard's Dream (orchestral version)"	3:42
6.	"The Magic of the Wizard's Dream (album version)"	4:26
7.	"Autumn Twilight"	3:36
8.	"Lo Specchio d'Argento"	4:15
Total length:		30:47

== Release ==
An alternate release of the single exists, where tracks 3, 4, 5 and 7 are not present, replaced by "The Last Angels' Call" (from Symphony of Enchanted Lands II: The Dark Secret)

=== CD slim box single track list ===
No.	Title	Length
1.	"The Magic of the Wizard's Dream (English version)"	3:42
2.	"The Magic of the Wizard's Dream (Italian version)"	3:41
3.	"The Magic of the Wizard's Dream (Album version)"	4:26
4.	"Lo Specchio d'Argento"	4:15
5.	"The Last Angels' Call"	4:39
Total length:		24:24

== Personnel ==
Rhapsody of Fire

- Fabio Lione – vocals
- Luca Turilli – guitars
- Alex Staropoli – keyboards
- Alex Holzwarth – drums
- Patrice Guers – bass guitar

Additional musicians

- Christopher Lee – vocals
- Manuel Staropoli – flute
- Dominique Leurquin – guitars

Bohuslav Martinů Philharmonic Orchestra

- Emil Nosek – violin
- František Hrubý – violin
- Hana Roušarová – violin
- Hana Tesařová – violin
- Jan Nedoma – violin
- Jana Štípková – violin
- Jitka Hanáková – violin
- Milan Lapka – violin
- Miroslav Křivánek – violin
- Přemysl Roušar – violin
- Dana Blahutová – violin
- Hana Bílková – violin
- Jan Kotulan – violin
- Jaroslav Aladzas – violin
- Jitka Šuranská – violin
- Josef Geryk – violin
- Josef Kubelka – violin
- Josef Vyžrálek – violin
- Leo Sláma – violin
- Yvona Fialová – violin
- Dana Božková – viola
- Juraj Petrovič – viola
- Lucie Dümlerová – viola
- Michaela Slámová – viola
- Miroslav Kašný – viola
- Oldřich Šebestík – viola
- Pavel Novák – viola
- Roman Janů – viola
- Alexandr Erml – celli
- David Kefer – celli
- Erich Hulín – celli
- Hana Škarpová – celli
- Zdenka Aladzasová – celli
- Zuzana Ermlová – celli
- Josef Horák – double bass
- Michal Pášma – double bass
- Pavel Juřík – double bass
- Vladimír Hudeček – double bass
- Vítězslav Pelikán – double bass
- Jana Holásková – flute
- Jiřina Vodičková – flute
- Vladimír Vodička – flute
- Krista Hallová – oboe
- Svatopluk Holásek – oboe
- Aleš Pavlorek – clarinet
- Jiří Kundl – clarinet
- Jaroslav Janoštík – bassoon
- Václav Kaniok – bassoon
- František Vyskočil – French horn
- Jiří Zatloukal – French horn
- Josef Číhal – French horn
- Milan Kubát – French horn
- Rudolf Linner – French horn
- Vlastimil Kelar – French horn
- Pavel Skopal – trumpet
- Rostislav Killar – trumpet
- Zdeněk Macek – trumpet
- Ivan Dřínovský – trombone
- Milan Tesař – trombone
- Roman Sklenář – trombone
- Miloslav Žváček – tuba
- Lucie Vápová – harp

Production

- Joey DeMaio – production
- Petr Pololáník – orchestra conductor
