= Tales from the Emerald Sword Saga =

Compilation album by Rhapsody
- Released: March 1, 2004
- Recorded: April 1997 – January 2002, Multiple studios
- Genre: Symphonic metal, power metal
- Length: 70:58
- Label: Limb Music

Rhapsody compilation album chronology
Tales from the Emerald Sword Saga (2004)	Legendary Years (2017)

Tales from the Emerald Sword Saga is the first compilation album by the Italian symphonic power metal band Rhapsody in 2004.

== Track listing ==
No.	Title	Length
1.	"Warrior of Ice" (from Legendary Tales, 1997)	6:02
2.	"Rage of the Winter (Symphonic version)" (from the single "Holy Thunderforce", 2000)	4:48
3.	"Forest of Unicorns" (from Legendary Tales)	3:24
4.	"Land of Immortals (Remix)" (from the single "Emerald Sword", 1998)	4:52
5.	"Emerald Sword" (from Symphony of Enchanted Lands, 1998)	4:21
6.	"Wisdom of the Kings" (from Symphony of Enchanted Lands)	4:29
7.	"Wings of Destiny" (from Symphony of Enchanted Lands)	4:28
8.	"Riding the Winds of Eternity (Edit)"	3:48
9.	"Dawn of Victory" (from Dawn of Victory, 2000)	4:47
10.	"Holy Thunderforce (Remix)"	4:21
11.	"The Village of Dwarves" (from Dawn of Victory)	3:52
12.	"Rain of a Thousand Flames" (from Rain of a Thousand Flames, 2001)	3:47
13.	"Knightrider of Doom" (from Power of the Dragonflame, 2002)	3:57
14.	"March of the Swordmaster" (from Power of the Dragonflame)	5:04
15.	"Power of the Dragonflame" (from Power of the Dragonflame)	4:27
16.	"Lamento Eroico" (from Power of the Dragonflame)	4:39
Total length:		70:58

== Track differences ==
- Track 8, "Riding the Winds of Eternity", is the same as the one found in Symphony of Enchanted Lands, only with the sound of waves at the beginning left out.
- Track 9, "Dawn of Victory", features a brief tympani roll at the start of the track not found on the album version.
- Track 10, "Holy Thunderforce", distinguishes itself from the original version from Dawn of Victory for the loss of most of the choir parts.
