= Live in Canada 2005: The Dark Secret =

Live album by Rhapsody
- Released: 23 January 2006
- Recorded: 14 June 2005
- Venue: Métropolis (Montreal)
- Genre: Symphonic metal, power metal
- Length: 60:06
- Label: Magic Circle Music
- Producer: Rhapsody, Sascha Paeth, Joey DeMaio

Rhapsody live album chronology
Live in Canada 2005: The Dark Secret (2006)	Live – From Chaos to Eternity (2013)

Professional ratings
Review scores
Source	Rating
Allmusic	3.5/5 stars

Live in Canada 2005: The Dark Secret is the first live album by the Italian symphonic power metal band Rhapsody. It was recorded on 14 June 2005 at the Métropolis in Montreal, Canada, during the first part of the Demons, Dragons and Warriors World Tour.

It is the last release of the band under the name Rhapsody. They changed their name to Rhapsody of Fire later that year.

== Track listing ==
Disc 1

No.	Title	Length
1.	"The Dark Secret"	3:06
2.	"Unholy Warcry"	5:32
3.	"Wisdom of the Kings"	4:21
4.	"Village of Dwarves"	3:59
5.	"Erian's Mystical Rhymes"	13:12
6.	"Dawn of Victory"	6:17
7.	"Lamento Eroico"	4:45
8.	"Nightfall on the Grey Mountains"	4:41
9.	"March of the Swordmaster"	5:07
10.	"Emerald Sword"	6:07
11.	"Gran Finale"	3:03
Total length:		1:00:10

Disc 2 – Limited Edition DVD

1. Concert in Dolby Digital 5.1 Surround – 60:07
2. Preview: Introduction & USA – 1:58
3. Preview: Canada – 3:42
4. Preview: Europe – 5:14

== Personnel ==
Credits for Live in Canada 2005: The Dark Secret adapted from liner notes.

Rhapsody of Fire

- Fabio Lione – lead vocals
- Luca Turilli – guitar
- Dominique Leurquin – guitar
- Alex Staropoli – keyboards
- Patrice Guers – bass
- Alex Holzwarth – drums

Additional musician

- Dominique Leurquin – guitar

Production

- Sascha Paeth – production, engineering, mixing
- Dirk Kloiber – recording
- Philip Colodetti – engineering
- Ernst Seider – engineering
- Bob Rager – engineering
- Joey DeMaio – executive producer
- Karsten vom Wege – cover art, layout

== Charts ==
Chart (2006)	Peak position
French Albums (SNEP)	123
German Albums (Offizielle Top 100)	99
Italian Albums (FIMI)	57
