= Michael Rodenberg =

German keyboard player (born 1970)

Michael "Miro" Rodenberg
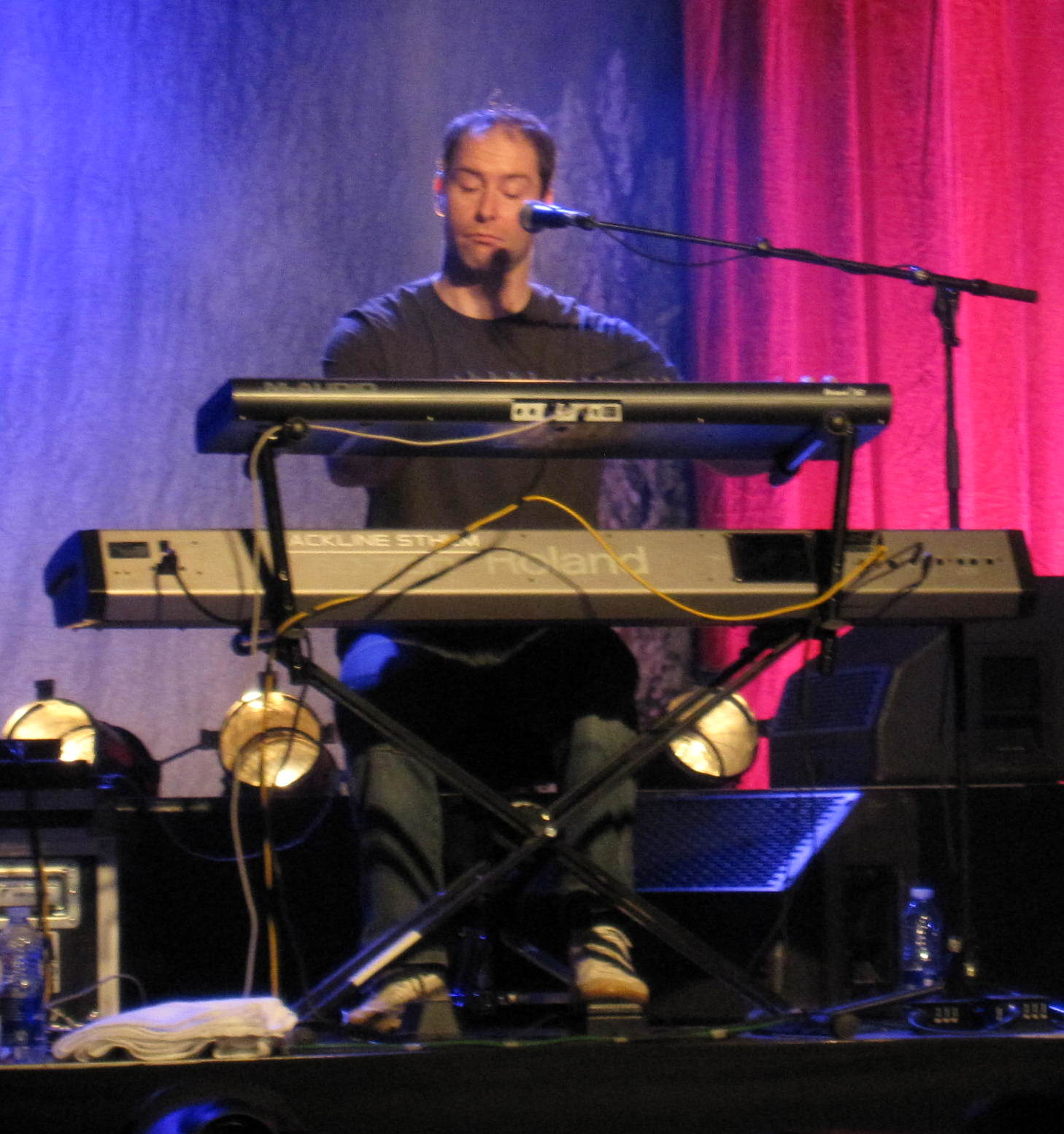

Background information
- Born: Wolfsburg, Germany
- Genres: Power metal, symphonic metal, heavy metal
- Occupations: Musician, record producer

Michael Rodenberg, nicknamed Miro (born 9 April 1970), is a German keyboard player and record producer known for working with power metal bands such as Angra, Shaaman, Luca Turilli, Rhapsody of Fire, Kamelot, and Heavens Gate. He mainly works in conjunction with his some-time bandmate Sascha Paeth.

In addition to his production work, Miro has made guest appearances for many of the bands he works with as a keyboard player, and also provides orchestral arrangements. He served a particularly long period as a guest of Kamelot, providing all keyboards on their studio albums from 1999 until 2005, when they hired tour musician Oliver Palotai as a full-time member.

In 2004, he participated in Aina, a metal opera featuring many guest heavy metal musicians.

In 2007, Miro and Sacha Paeth helped to relaunch Tobias Sammet's metal opera Avantasia, with the albums of The Wicked Trilogy (on which Miro played most of the keyboard parts and orchestrations), also leading it to have a live band and play world tours.

== Work ==
=== Production ===
- 1991 - Heavens Gate - "The Best Days of my Life" (Single)
- 1997 - Rhapsody - Legendary Tales (CD)
- 1998 - Rhapsody - Symphony of Enchanted Lands (CD)
- 1999 - Luca Turilli - King of the Nordic Twilight (CD)
- 1999 - Kamelot - The Fourth Legacy (CD)
- 2000 - Rhapsody - Dawn of Victory (CD)
- 2000 - Rhapsody - Holy Thunderforce (CD5")
- 2001 - Kamelot - Karma (CD)
- 2001 - Rhapsody - Rain of a Thousand Flames (CD)
- 2002 - Rhapsody - Power of the Dragonflame (CD)
- 2002 - Luca Turilli - Prophet of the Last Eclipse (CD)
- 2003 - Kamelot - Epica (CD)
- 2004 - Rhapsody - Tales from the Emerald Sword Saga (CD)
- 2004 - After Forever - Invisible Circles (CD)
- 2005 - Kamelot - The Black Halo (CD)
- 2005 - Epica - The Score – An Epic Journey (SACD)
- 2007 - Kamelot - Ghost Opera (CD)
- 2007 - Epica - The Divine Conspiracy (CD)
- 2009 - Epica - Design Your Universe (CD)
- 2010 - Kamelot - Poetry for the Poisoned (CD)
- 2011 - Trillium - Alloy (CD)
- 2012 - Epica - Requiem for the Indifferent (CD)

=== Appearance ===
==== Aina ====
- 2003 - Days of Rising Doom (CD/DVD)

==== Angra ====
- 2004 - Temple of Shadows (CD)

==== Avantasia ====
- 2007 - Lost in Space Part I (EP)
- 2007 - Lost in Space Part II (EP)
- 2008 - The Scarecrow (CD)
- 2010 - The Wicked Symphony (CD)
- 2010 - Angel of Babylon (CD)
- 2011 - The Flying Opera (CD/DVD)
- 2013 - The Mystery of Time (CD)
- 2016 - Ghostlights (CD)
- 2019 - Moonglow (CD)

==== Brainstorm ====
- 2000 - Ambiguity (CD)
- 2001 - Metus Mortis (CD)
- 2003 - Soul Temptation (CD)

==== Conception ====
- 2018 - My Dark Symphony (EP)
- 2020 - State of Deception (CD)

==== Edguy ====
- 2011 - Age of the Joker

==== Kamelot ====
- 1999 - The Fourth Legacy (CD)
- 2001 - Karma (CD)
- 2003 - Epica (CD)
- 2005 - The Black Halo (CD)
- 2007 - Ghost Opera (CD)
- 2010 - Poetry for the Poisoned (CD)
- 2012 - Silverthorn (CD)
- 2015 - Haven (CD)
- 2018 - The Shadow Theory (CD)
- 2023 - The Awakening (CD)

==== Rhapsody of Fire ====
- 1997 - Legendary Tales (Choir and producer)
- 1999 - Symphony of Enchanted Lands (Choir and producer)
- 2000 - Dawn of Victory (Epic choir and producer)
- 2002 - Power of the Dragonflame (Epic Choir and producer)

==== Luca Turilli ====
- 1999 - King of the Nordic Twilight (CD)
- 2002 - Prophet of the Last Eclipse (CD)

==== Shaaman ====
- 2002 - Ritual
- 2005 - Reason (CD)

==== Thalion ====
- 2004 - Another Sun (CD)
