= Symphony of Enchanted Lands II – The Dark Secret =

Studio album by Rhapsody
- Released: September 27, 2004
- Recorded: March–June 2004, Multiple studios
- Genres: Symphonic power metal; neoclassical metal
- Length: 72:46
- Label: SPV GmbH
- Producers: Luca Turilli, Alex Staropoli

Rhapsody studio album chronology
| Power of the Dragonflame (2002) | Symphony of Enchanted Lands II – The Dark Secret (2004) | Triumph or Agony (2006) |

Singles from Symphony of Enchanted Lands II – The Dark Secret
- 1. "Unholy Warcry" Released: June 28, 2004; 2. "The Magic of the Wizard's Dream" Released: March 29, 2005

Professional ratings
Review scores
| Source | Rating |
|---|---|
| Metal Rules | 4.5/5 stars |
| RevelationZ | 8.5/10 stars |

Symphony of Enchanted Lands II – The Dark Secret is the sixth studio album by the Italian symphonic power metal band Rhapsody, released on September 27, 2004. A concept album like all previous albums of the band, it is not a sequel to Symphony of Enchanted Lands but the first chapter of the band's new saga, The Dark Secret Saga, which would conclude with their ninth album From Chaos to Eternity.

Christopher Lee provides the spoken narration throughout this album. He is also a guest singer in the single version of the song "The Magic of the Wizard's Dream".

It is the last studio release of the band under the name Rhapsody. They changed their name to Rhapsody of Fire in 2006.

== Track listing ==
All lyrics are written by Luca Turilli; all music is composed by Turilli and Alex Staropoli, excepted where noted.

| No. | Title | Writer(s) | Length |
|---|---|---|---|
| 1. | "The Dark Secret"; I. "The Ancient Prophecy"; II. "Ira Divina (Divine Wrath)" | Staropoli | 4:12: 2:24; 1:48 |
| 2. | "Unholy Warcry" | | 5:53 |
| 3. | "Never Forgotten Heroes" | | 5:32 |
| 4. | "Elgard's Green Valleys" | | 2:19 |
| 5. | "The Magic of the Wizard's Dream" | | 4:26 |
| 6. | "Erian's Mystical Rhymes (The White Dragon's Order)" | Turilli, Staropoli, Vivaldi | 10:31 |
| 7. | "The Last Angels' Call" | | 4:39 |
| 8. | "Dragonland's Rivers" | | 3:44 |
| 9. | "Sacred Power of Raging Winds" | | 10:06 |
| 10. | "Guardiani del destino" | Turilli | 5:50 |
| 11. | "Shadows of Death" | | 8:13 |
| 12. | "Nightfall on the Grey Mountains" | | 7:20 |
| Total length: | | | 72:46 |

The album was also made available in a Digipak edition containing a bonus disc with several extra tracks.

Digipack edition CD 2 bonus tracks
| No. | Title | Length |
|---|---|---|
| 1. | "Age of the Red Moon" | 3:45 |
| 2. | "Guardians of Destiny" | 5:28 |
| 3. | "Thunder’s Mighty Roar" | 5:36 |
| 4. | "Lo Specchio D’argento" | 4:13 |
| Total length: | | 19:02 |

== Personnel ==
Credits for Symphony of Enchanted Lands II – The Dark Secret adapted from liner notes.

Rhapsody of Fire

- Fabio Lione – lead vocals
- Luca Turilli – guitars, production
- Alex Staropoli – keyboards, orchestral arrangements, production
- Patrice Guers – bass
- Alex Holzwarth – drums

Additional musicians

- Manuel Staropoli – baroque recorder
- Christopher Lee – narration
- Toby Eddington – narration
- Dominique Leurquin – guitars (rhythm)
- Johannes Monno – guitars (classical)
- Stefan Horz – harpsichord
- Søren Leupold – lute
- Paulina van Laarhoven – viola
- Bridget Fogle – soprano vocals, choir vocals

Choir

- Cinzia Rizzo, Gerit Göbel, Miro Rodenberg, Olaf Hayer, Previn Moore, Robert Hunecke-Rizzo, Thomas Rettke

Brno Academy Choir

- Dana Kurečková, Iva Holubová, Jana Klinerová, Jaroslava Zezulová, Kateřina Hudcová, Lucie Matalová, Ludmila Kieseljovová, Ludmila Markesová, Vladimíra Dolejšová, Jiří Klecker, Karel Seffer, Libor Markes, Michael Pinsker, Milan Hanzliczek, Pavel Konárek, Robert Kurečka, Serhij Derda, Tomáš Ibrmajer, Vladimír Kutnohorský, Alena Sobolová, Andrea Dáňová, Barbora Francová, Dana Toncrová, Eva Badalová, Eva Klepalová, Kateřina Nejedlá, Kateřina Pastrňáková, Magda Krejčová, Marie Vališová, Petra Bodová, Petra Koňárková, Terezie Kamenická, Terezie Plevová, Zora Jaborníková, Ivan Nepivoda, Jakub Herzan, Jiří Barták, Marek Mikuš, Matěj Dupal, Tomáš Kamenický, Vladimír Prachař, Vít Matuška

Bohuslav Martinů Philharmonic Orchestra

- Emil Nosek – violin
- František Hrubý – violin
- Hana Roušarová – violin
- Hana Tesařová – violin
- Jan Nedoma – violin
- Jana Štípková – violin
- Jitka Hanáková – violin
- Milan Lapka – violin
- Miroslav Křivánek – violin
- Přemysl Roušar – violin
- Dana Blahutová – violin
- Hana Bílková – violin
- Jan Kotulan – violin
- Jaroslav Aladzas – violin
- Jitka Šuranská – violin
- Josef Geryk – violin
- Josef Kubelka – violin
- Josef Vyžrálek – violin
- Leo Sláma – violin
- Yvona Fialová – violin
- Dana Božková – viola
- Juraj Petrovič – viola
- Lucie Dümlerová – viola
- Michaela Slámová – viola
- Miroslav Kašný – viola
- Oldřich Šebestík – viola
- Pavel Novák – viola
- Roman Janů – viola
- Alexandr Erml – cello
- David Kefer – cello
- Erich Hulín – cello
- Hana Škarpová – cello
- Zdenka Aladzasová – cello
- Zuzana Ermlová – cello
- Josef Horák – double bass
- Michal Pášma – double bass
- Pavel Juřík – double bass
- Vladimír Hudeček – double bass
- Vítězslav Pelikán – double bass
- Jana Holásková – flute
- Jiřina Vodičková – flute
- Vladimír Vodička – flute
- Krista Hallová – oboe
- Svatopluk Holásek – oboe
- Aleš Pavlorek – clarinet
- Jiří Kundl – clarinet
- Jaroslav Janoštík – bassoon
- Václav Kaniok – bassoon
- František Vyskočil – French horn
- Jiří Zatloukal – French horn
- Josef Číhal – French horn
- Milan Kubát – French horn
- Rudolf Linner – French horn
- Vlastimil Kelar – French horn
- Pavel Skopal – trumpet
- Rostislav Killar – trumpet
- Zdeněk Macek – trumpet
- Ivan Dřínovský – trombone
- Milan Tesař – trombone
- Roman Sklenář – trombone
- Miloslav Žváček – tuba
- Lucie Vápová – harp

Production

- Sascha Paeth – mixing, engineering
- Rob La Vaque – engineering
- Filip Heurckmans – mastering
- Stefan Schmidt – engineering (orchestra)
- Bernd Kugler – engineering (orchestra)
- Jan Wrede – engineering (orchestra)
- Marc Lenz – engineering (orchestra)
- Joey DeMaio – executive producer
- Petr Pololáník – orchestra conductor
- Jaroslav Kyzlink – choir conductor
- Marek Obdržálek – orchestra director
- Marc Klinnert – artwork, design
- Eric Philippe – logo
- Karsten vom Wege – design
- Karsten Koch – photography

== Charts ==
| Chart (2004) | Peak position |
|---|---|
| French Albums (SNEP) | 27 |
| Dutch Albums (Album Top 100) | 70 |
| German Albums (Offizielle Top 100) | 33 |
| Swiss Albums (Schweizer Hitparade) | 62 |
