= From Chaos to Eternity =

Studio album by Rhapsody of Fire
- Released: June 17, 2011
- Recorded: September 2010 – January 2011
- Genres: Symphonic power metal; neoclassical metal
- Length: 57:26
- Label: Nuclear Blast
- Producers: Luca Turilli, Alex Staropoli

Rhapsody of Fire studio album chronology
The Frozen Tears of Angels (2010)	From Chaos to Eternity (2011)	Dark Wings of Steel (2013)

Singles from From Chaos to Eternity
- 1. "Aeons of Raging Darkness" Released: May 6, 2011

Professional ratings
Review scores
Source	Rating
Black Wind Metal	(4.25/5)
Suite101	4.5/5 stars
Metalholic	9.5/10 stars

From Chaos to Eternity is the ninth studio album by the Italian symphonic power metal band Rhapsody of Fire. It was released on June 17, 2011 via Nuclear Blast. This is the last album to feature long-time guitarist/songwriter Luca Turilli, bassist Patrice Guers, and session guitarist Dominique Leurquin, who all left the band on good terms in August 2011 to found Luca Turilli's Rhapsody, the last album with Christopher Lee as narrator, and the only album with guitarist Tom Hess.

It is the last album to be based on a fantasy saga until their new album The Eighth Mountain, and the final album in the Algalord Chronicles, a long conceptual storyline originating from the band's 1997 debut, Legendary Tales. Due to Hess leaving the band in 2013 and not being replaced, it is the only album by the band with two guitarists recognized as full-time members.

The song "From Chaos To Eternity" was listed in the top 100 album charts in many countries around the world, such as Japan, Italy, Switzerland, Germany, France and many others.

== Track listing ==
All lyrics are written by Luca Turilli except track 10 by Bruce Dickinson; all music is composed by Turilli and Alex Staropoli except track 10 by Dickinson and tracks 3 and 9 which also includes music from Ludwig van Beethoven's Piano Sonata N.1

No.	Title	Length
1.	"Ad Infinitum" ("To Infinity")	1:28
2.	"From Chaos to Eternity"	5:45
3.	"Tempesta di fuoco" ("Firestorm")	4:46
4.	"Ghosts of Forgotten Worlds"	5:31
5.	"Anima perduta" ("Lost Soul")	4:45
6.	"Aeons of Raging Darkness"	5:41
7.	"I Belong to the Stars"	4:52
8.	"Tornado"	4:55
9.	"Heroes of the Waterfalls' Kingdom"; I. "Lo spirito della foresta" ("The Spirit of the Forest"); II. "Realm of Sacred Waterfalls"; III. "Thanor's Awakening"; IV. "Northern Skies Enflamed"; V. "The Splendour of Angels' Glory (A Final Revelation)"	19:38; 3:15; 4:41; 3:21; 4:12; 4:09
Total length:		57:21

Digipak edition bonus track
No.	Title	Length
10.	"Flash of the Blade" (Iron Maiden cover)	4:17
Total length:		61:38

Japanese edition bonus track
No.	Title	Length
11.	"Tornado (Instrumental)"	6:33
Total length:		68:11

== Personnel ==
Rhapsody of Fire

- Fabio Lione – lead vocals
- Luca Turilli – guitar
- Tom Hess – guitar
- Patrice Guers – bass
- Alex Staropoli – keyboards
- Alex Holzwarth – drums

Additional musicians/voice cast

- Dominique Leurquin – guitar
- Christopher Lee – spoken vocals: narrator/The Wizard King, backing vocals
- Toby Eddington – spoken vocals: Iras Algor
- Stash Kirkbride – spoken vocals: Dargor
- Christina Lee – spoken vocals: Lothen
- Marcus d'Amico – spoken vocals: Khaas
- Simon Fielding – spoken vocals: Tarish
- Manuel Staropoli – baroque recorder
- Olaf Reitmeir – classical and acoustic guitars, acoustic bass
- Thomas Rettke, Herbie Langhans, Miro and Robert Huneeke – choir

Production

- Luca Turilli – production, booklet concept, cover concept
- Alex Staropoli – production, orchestral arrangements
- Sascha Paeth – mixing, engineering and editing
- Olaf Reitmeir and Simon Oberender – engineering and editing
- Miro – mastering
- Felipe Machado Franco – cover art, booklet layout, cover concept, photos retouching
- Janina Snatzke and Stephen Jensen – photos
- Nadia Bellir – Christopher Lee's costume design (photo)
- Tanya Seeman – Christopher Lee's costume making (photo)

== Charts ==
Chart (2011)	Peak position
Belgian Albums (Ultratop Wallonia)	100
French Albums (SNEP)	81
German Albums (Offizielle Top 100)	56
Italian Albums (FIMI)	58
Japanese Albums (Oricon)	65
Swiss Albums (Schweizer Hitparade)	48
UK Rock & Metal Albums (Official Charts)	39
