= The Frozen Tears of Angels =

Studio album by Rhapsody of Fire
- Released: April 30, 2010
- Recorded: Gate Studio (Wolfsburg, Germany), September–October 2009
- Genres: Symphonic power metal; neoclassical metal
- Length: 57:02
- Label: Nuclear Blast
- Producers: Luca Turilli, Alex Staropoli

Rhapsody of Fire studio album chronology
Triumph or Agony (2006)	The Frozen Tears of Angels (2010)	From Chaos to Eternity (2011)

Singles from The Frozen Tears of Angels
- 1. "Reign of Terror" Released: April 11, 2010

Professional ratings
Review scores
Source	Rating
About.com	3.5/5 stars
Allmusic	4/5 stars
Jukebox:Metal	3/5 stars

The Frozen Tears of Angels is the eighth studio album by the Italian symphonic power metal band Rhapsody of Fire. It was released on April 30, 2010, via Nuclear Blast. It is the first album to be released after a long hiatus, caused by a legal dispute with the band's previous label, Magic Circle Music. The concept album is the third chapter of The Dark Secret Saga, which began with Symphony of Enchanted Lands II: The Dark Secret.

The artwork for the album was created by Colombian artist Felipe Machado Franco.

In 2021, it was elected by Metal Hammer as the 13th best symphonic metal album of all time.

== Track list ==
All lyrics are written by Luca Turilli; all music is composed by Alex Staropoli and Turilli, except where noted.

No.	Title	Music	Length
1.	"Dark Frozen World (intro)"	Staropoli	2:13
2.	"Sea of Fate"	Fabio Lione, Turilli, Staropoli	4:47
3.	"Crystal Moonlight"		4:25
4.	"Reign of Terror"		6:52
5.	"Danza di fuoco e ghiaccio" ("Dance of Fire and Ice")	Turilli	6:24
6.	"Raging Starfire"		4:56
7.	"Lost in Cold Dreams"	Lione, Turilli, Staropoli	5:12
8.	"On the Way to Ainor"		6:58
9.	"The Frozen Tears of Angels"	Lione, Turilli, Staropoli	11:17
10.	"Labyrinth of Madness (outro)"		3:58
Total length:			57:02

Japanese edition bonus tracks
No.	Title	Length
11.	"Immortal New Reign"	5:29
Total length:		62:31

Digipak edition bonus tracks
No.	Title	Length
12.	"Sea of Fate (Orchestral version)" (Lione, Turilli, Staropoli)	3:54
Total length:		66:25

== Charts ==
Chart (2010)	Peak position
Austrian Albums Chart	58
Belgian Albums Chart	96
Canadian Albums Chart	129
European Albums (Billboard)	59
Finnish Albums Chart	35
French Albums Chart	51
German Albums Chart	33
Greek Albums Chart	11
Italian Albums Chart	31
Japanese Albums Chart	41
South Korean Albums Chart	69
Spanish Albums Chart	81
Swedish Albums Chart	53
Swiss Albums Chart	39
US Independent Albums (Billboard)	132
US Hard Rock Albums (Billboard)	60
US Heatseekers Albums (Billboard)	52

== Credits ==
Rhapsody of Fire

- Fabio Lione – vocals
- Luca Turilli – guitars, production, cover art
- Alex Staropoli – keyboards, production, cover art
- Patrice Guers – bass
- Alex Holzwarth – drums

Additional personnel

- Dominique Leurquin – additional guitars
- Christopher Lee – narration
- Toby Eddington – narration
- Stash Kirkbride – narration
- Christina Lee – narration
- Marcus D'Amico – narration
- Simon Fielding – narration
- Susannah York – narration
- Manuel Staropoli – baroque recorder
- Søren Leupold – lute
- Bridget Fogle – soprano vocals, choir vocals

Choir

- Herbie Langhans, Previn Moore, Robert Hunecke-Rizzo, Thomas Rettke

Production

- Sascha Paeth – mixing, engineering, editing, additional guitars
- Olaf Reitmeier – engineering, editing, additional guitars
- Simon Oberender – engineering, editing, choir vocals
- Miro – mastering
- Karsten vom Wege – logo
- Felipe Machado Franco – cover art, photography
- Janina Snatzke – photography
