= The Eighth Mountain =

2019 album by Rhapsody of Fire

Studio album by Rhapsody of Fire
- Released: 22 February 2019
- Recorded: June–November 2018
- Studio: Greenman Studios (Arnsberg); Studio I BNR (Sofia)
- Genre: Symphonic power metal
- Length: 64:30
- Label: AFM Records
- Producer: Alex Staropoli

Rhapsody of Fire studio album chronology
Into the Legend (2016)	The Eighth Mountain (2019)	Glory for Salvation (2021)

Singles from The Eighth Mountain
- 1. "The Legend Goes On" Released: 30 November 2018; 2. "Rain of Fury" Released: 11 January 2019; 3. "Master of Peace" Released: 15 February 2019

The Eighth Mountain is the twelfth studio album by the Italian symphonic power metal band Rhapsody of Fire. It was released on 22 February 2019 via AFM Records.

The album is the first chapter in a new saga, written by Alex Staropoli and Roberto De Micheli, entitled The Nephilim's Empire Saga. It is the first saga not written by Luca Turilli, who left the band in 2011. It is also the first studio album without vocalist Fabio Lione and the first without longtime drummer Alex Holzwarth since 1998's Symphony of Enchanted Lands. They were replaced by Giacomo Voli and Manu Lotter respectively, though it would be the only studio album with drummer Manu Lotter. English actor Christopher Lee, who died in 2015, posthumously appears on the track "Tales of a Hero's Fate" as a narrator.

A music video for "Rain of Fury" was released on 11 January 2019.

== Track listing ==
All lyrics are written by Giacomo Voli, Roberto de Micheli and Alex Staropoli; all music is composed by Alex Staropoli and Roberto de Micheli.

No.	Title	Length
1.	"Abyss of Pain"	0:48
2.	"Seven Heroic Deeds"	4:47
3.	"Master of Peace"	5:31
4.	"Rain of Fury"	4:09
5.	"White Wizard"	4:56
6.	"Warrior Heart"	4:29
7.	"The Courage to Forgive"	4:54
8.	"March Against the Tyrant"	9:22
9.	"Clash of Times"	4:41
10.	"The Legend Goes On"	4:45
11.	"The Wind, the Rain and the Moon"	5:22
12.	"Tales of a Hero's Fate"	10:47
Total length:		64:30

Japanese bonus track
No.	Title	Length
13.	"Rain of Fury" (Japanese version)	4:09
Total length:		68:40

== Personnel ==
Credits for The Eighth Mountain adapted from liner notes.

Rhapsody of Fire

- Alex Staropoli – keyboards, production, engineer, recording, orchestra and choir arrangements, songwriting, lyrics
- Roberto De Micheli – guitars, songwriting, lyrics
- Alessandro Sala – bass
- Giacomo Voli – lead vocals, lyrics
- Manu Lotter – drums

Additional personnel

- Christopher Lee – posthumous narration on track 12
- Manuel Staropoli – flute, oboe
- Manuel Tomadin – harpsichord
- Vito Lo Re – orchestra conductor, scoring
- Bulgarian National Radio Symphony Orchestra – orchestra

Choir

- Alex Mari, Angelo Guidetti, Beatrice Bini, Chiara Tricarico, Enrico Correggia, Fabio Sambenini, Gabriele Gozzi, Marco Vincini, Monica Marozzi, Niccolò Porcedda, Raffaele Albanese, Stefano Ciceri, Stefano Corradini

Production

- Karsten Koch – photography
- Alex Charleux – cover art
- Sebastian "Seeb" Levermann – engineer, recording, mixing, mastering
- Marco Straccioni – recording, mixing (orchestra)
- Slav Slavtchev – orchestra contractor
- Maurizio Assenti – layout

== Charts ==
Chart (2019)	Peak position
Belgian Albums (Ultratop Wallonia)	148
French Albums (SNEP)	185
German Albums (Offizielle Top 100)	22
Italian Albums (FIMI)	88
Japanese Albums (Oricon)	118
Swiss Albums (Schweizer Hitparade)	25
