= Staropoli =

Staropoli is a surname. Notable people with the surname include:

- Alex Staropoli (born 1970), Italian musician
- Laureano Staropoli (born 1993), Argentine mixed martial arts fighter
