= Dark Wings of Steel =

Studio album by Rhapsody of Fire
- Released: November 22, 2013 (Europe); December 3, 2013 (America)
- Recorded: August–October 2013
- Genre: Symphonic power metal
- Length: 59:27
- Label: AFM Records, Roadrunner Records
- Producer: Alex Staropoli

Rhapsody of Fire studio album chronology
From Chaos to Eternity (2011)	Dark Wings of Steel (2013)	Into the Legend (2016)

Professional ratings
Review scores
Source	Rating
About.com	3/5 stars
MetalTraveller	4.5/5 stars
Nightfall in Metal Earth	1/5 stars

Dark Wings of Steel is the tenth studio album by the Italian symphonic power metal band Rhapsody of Fire. It was released on November 22, 2013, in Europe and December 3, 2013, in the United States via AFM Records. Following the various line-up changes since the previous album From Chaos to Eternity in 2011, Dark Wings of Steel is the first album by the band to not feature guitarist and founding member Luca Turilli, the first with guitarist Roberto De Micheli, and the only album with bassist Oliver Holzwarth.

== Background ==
Due to Turilli writing the lyrics and co-composing the songs with keyboardist Alex Staropoli in the previous albums, the lyrics are written by singer Fabio Lione, with Staropoli now composing the music with his brother Manuel. Following the departure of other guitarist Tom Hess earlier in the year, the album also marks the return to one full-time guitarist only.

Alex Staropoli stated: "Fabio from now on will be in charge of writing the lyrics and I think this is really important for a singer to be able to write and sing its own lyrics". He also noted about his brother Manuel: "I knew my brother had lots of talent and he proved himself by submitting me with many great songs, which some of them I had to arrange and to use. I am so proud of him and there is a lot more to come".

== Track listing ==
All lyrics are written by Fabio Lione; all music is composed by Roberto de Micheli, Alex Staropoli and Manuel Staropoli.

No.	Title	Length
1.	"Vis Divina" ("Divine Strength")	1:28
2.	"Rising from Tragic Flames"	6:16
3.	"Angel of Light"	7:05
4.	"Tears of Pain"	6:27
5.	"Fly to Crystal Skies"	5:13
6.	"My Sacrifice"	8:05
7.	"Silver Lake of Tears"	5:00
8.	"Custode di pace" ("Keeper of Peace")	5:07
9.	"A Tale of Magic"	4:18
10.	"Dark Wings of Steel"	5:51
11.	"Sad Mystic Moon"	4:37
Total length:		59:27

Digipak & vinyl edition bonus track
No.	Title	Length
12.	"A Candle to Light" (English version of Custode di Pace)	6:56
Total length:		66:23

Japanese edition bonus track
No.	Title	Length
12.	"Voler Vers Toi" (French version of Custode di Pace)	5:07
Total length:		64:34

== Personnel ==
Credits for Dark Wings of Steel adapted from liner notes.

Rhapsody of Fire

- Fabio Lione – lead vocals
- Roberto De Micheli – guitars
- Oliver Holzwarth – bass
- Alex Staropoli – keyboards, production, engineering, editing, cover and booklet concept
- Alex Holzwarth – drums

Additional musicians

- Manuel Staropoli – baroque flute, baroque oboe, recorder, duduk
- Macedonian Radio Symphonic Orchestra – orchestra
- Vito Lo Ré – orchestra and choir conductor, scoring

Choir

- Hao Wang, Matjaž Zobec, Noémi Boros, Paola Marra

Production

- Sebastian Roeder – engineering, mixing, editing
- Giorgi Hristovski – engineering
- Boban Apostolov – engineering
- Alberto Bravin – engineering, editing
- Christoph Stickel – mastering
- Luca Balbo – choir contractor
- Severin Schweiger – photography
- Karsten vom Wege – logo
- Felipe Machado Franco – cover art, layout, cover concept

== Charts ==
Chart (2013)	Peak position
Japanese Albums (Oricon)	125
