= The Cold Embrace of Fear – A Dark Romantic Symphony =

EP by Rhapsody of Fire
- Released: 15 October 2010
- Recorded: Gate Studio (Wolfsburg, Germany), September–October 2009
- Genres: Symphonic power metal; neoclassical metal
- Length: 35:44
- Label: Nuclear Blast
- Producers: Luca Turilli, Alex Staropoli

Rhapsody of Fire EP chronology
The Dark Secret (2004)	The Cold Embrace of Fear – A Dark Romantic Symphony (2010)	I'll Be Your Hero (2021)

Professional ratings
Review scores
Source	Rating
The Pit.de	7/10 stars
powermetal.de	9/10 stars

The Cold Embrace of Fear – A Dark Romantic Symphony is the second EP by Italian symphonic power metal band Rhapsody of Fire. It is essentially one long, orchestral song divided into seven acts. The album was recorded at the same time as their eighth studio album The Frozen Tears of Angels and released on 15 October 2010 in Europe.

== Track listing ==
All lyrics are written by Luca Turilli; all music is composed by Turilli and Alex Staropoli, except where noted.

No.	Title	Music	Length
1.	"ACT I - The Pass of Nair-Kaan"		2:01
2.	"ACT II - Dark Mystic Vision"		1:41
3.	"ACT III - The Ancient Fires of Har-Kuun"		14:56
4.	"ACT IV - The Betrayal"		3:58
5.	"ACT V - Neve Rosso Sangue" (Blood Red Snow)	Turilli, Staropoli, Fabio Lione	4:41
6.	"ACT VI - Erian's Lost Secrets"	Turilli, Staropoli, Lione	4:28
7.	"ACT VII - The Angels' Dark Revelation (featuring Christopher Lee)"		3:59
Total length:			35:44

== Charts ==
Chart (2010)	Peak position
Italian Albums Chart	60
French Albums Chart	105
Japanese Albums Chart	200
