= Triumph or Agony =

Studio album by Rhapsody of Fire
- Released: 25 September 2006
- Genre: Symphonic power metal; neoclassical metal
- Length: 62:32
- Label: SPV GmbH
- Producer: Luca Turilli, Alex Staropoli, Sascha Paeth

Rhapsody of Fire studio album chronology
Symphony of Enchanted Lands II – The Dark Secret (2004)	Triumph or Agony (2006)	The Frozen Tears of Angels (2010)

Singles from Triumph or Agony
- 1. "A New Saga Begins" Released: Summer 2006; 2. "Silent Dream" Released: 2007

Professional ratings
Review scores
Source	Rating
Allmusic	3.5/5 stars

Triumph or Agony is the seventh studio album by the Italian symphonic power metal band Rhapsody of Fire, released in Europe on 25 September 2006. It is the first album that the band released after their name change.

Triumph or Agony features a live 70 piece orchestra and choir and was again self-produced by guitarist/songwriter Luca Turilli and keyboardist/songwriter Alex Staropoli with assistance from co-producer Sascha Paeth. The album also features an array of guest narrators and character actors, including several recruits from the London theatre scene, Susannah York of the Superman film series and a return appearance by Christopher Lee, as the all-knowing ‘Wizard King’. The song "Il Canto del Vento", is the first song in the band's history that is not composed by Turilli or Staropoli, instead it was composed by Fabio Lione.

The cover art is done by artist Jeff Easley, famous for his work on the Dungeons & Dragons line of products.

== Track listing ==
All lyrics are written by Luca Turilli, except track 6 by Fabio Lione; all music is composed by Turilli and Alex Staropoli, except track 6 by Fabio Lione.

No.	Title	Length
1.	"Dar-Kunor"; I. "Echoes from the Elvish Woods"; II. "Fear of the Dungeons"	3:13: 1:31; 1:42
2.	"Triumph or Agony"	5:02
3.	"Heart of the Darklands"	4:10
4.	"Old Age of Wonders"	4:35
5.	"The Myth of the Holy Sword"	5:03
6.	"Il Canto del Vento" ("The Chant of the Wind")	3:54
7.	"Silent Dream"	3:50
8.	"Bloody Red Dungeons"	5:11
9.	"Son of Pain"	4:42
10.	"The Mystic Prophecy of the Demonknight"; I. "A New Saga Begins"; II. "Through the Portals of Agony"; III. "The Black Order"; IV. "Nekron's Bloody Rhymes"; V. "Escape from Horror"	16:26: 8:39; 0:41; 2:36; 0:41; 3:45
11.	"Dark Reign of Fire"; I. "Dark Reign of Fire"; II. "Winter Dawn's Theme"	6:26: 1:45; 4:41
Total length:		62:32

French edition bonus tracks
No.	Title	Length
12.	"Son of Pain (French version)"	4:42
Total length:		67:14

French deluxe edition bonus tracks
No.	Title	Length
13.	"A New Saga Begins (Radio Edit)"	4:19
14.	"Defenders of Gaia"	4:35
Total length:		76:08

Italian edition bonus tracks
No.	Title	Length
12.	"Defenders of Gaia"	4:35
13.	"A New Saga Begins (Radio Edit)"	4:19
14.	"Son of Pain (Italian version)"	4:42
Total length:		76:08

== Personnel ==
Rhapsody of Fire

- Fabio Lione – lead vocals
- Luca Turilli – guitars, production
- Alex Staropoli – keyboards, orchestral arrangements, production
- Patrice Guers – bass
- Alex Holzwarth – drums

Additional personnel

- Manuel Staropoli – flute, recorder
- Christopher Lee – narration
- Toby Eddington – narration
- Stash Kirkbride – narration
- Christina Lee – narration
- Marcus D'Amico – narration
- Simon Fielding – narration
- Susannah York – narration
- Dominique Leurquin – guitar solos (2, 5, 7, 8)
- Johannes Monno – guitars (classical)
- Bridget Fogle – soprano vocals

Choir

- Cinzia Rizzo, Miro Rodenberg, Olaf Hayer, Previn Moore, Robert Hunecke-Rizzo, Thomas Rettke

Brno Academy Choir

- Dana Kurečková, Iva Holubová, Jana Klinerová, Jaroslava Zezulová, Kateřina Hudcová, Lucie Matalová, Ludmila Kieseljovová, Ludmila Markesová, Vladimíra Dolejšová, Jiří Klecker, Karel Seffer, Libor Markes, Michael Pinsker, Milan Hanzliczek, Pavel Konárek, Robert Kurečka, Serhij Derda, Tomáš Ibrmajer, Vladimír Kutnohorský, Alena Sobolová, Andrea Dáňová, Barbora Francová, Dana Toncrová, Eva Badalová, Eva Klepalová, Kateřina Nejedlá, Kateřina Pastrňáková, Magda Krejčová, Marie Vališová, Petra Bodová, Petra Koňárková, Terezie Kamenická, Terezie Plevová, Zora Jaborníková, Ivan Nepivoda, Jakub Herzan, Jiří Barták, Marek Mikuš, Matěj Dupal, Tomáš Kamenický, Vladimír Prachař, Vít Matuška

Bohuslav Martinů Philharmonic Orchestra

- Emil Nosek – violin
- František Hrubý – violin
- Hana Roušarová – violin
- Hana Tesařová – violin
- Jan Nedoma – violin
- Jana Štípková – violin
- Jitka Hanáková – violin
- Milan Lapka – violin
- Miroslav Křivánek – violin
- Přemysl Roušar – violin
- Dana Blahutová – violin
- Hana Bílková – violin
- Jan Kotulan – violin
- Jaroslav Aladzas – violin
- Jitka Šuranská – violin
- Josef Geryk – violin
- Josef Kubelka – violin
- Josef Vyžrálek – violin
- Leo Sláma – violin
- Yvona Fialová – violin
- Dana Božková – viola
- Juraj Petrovič – viola
- Lucie Dümlerová – viola
- Michaela Slámová – viola
- Miroslav Kašný – viola
- Oldřich Šebestík – viola
- Pavel Novák – viola
- Roman Janů – viola
- Alexandr Erml – celli
- David Kefer – celli
- Erich Hulín – celli
- Hana Škarpová – celli
- Zdenka Aladzasová – celli
- Zuzana Ermlová – celli
- Josef Horák – double bass
- Michal Pášma – double bass
- Pavel Juřík – double bass
- Vladimír Hudeček – double bass
- Vítězslav Pelikán – double bass
- Jana Holásková – flute
- Jiřina Vodičková – flute
- Vladimír Vodička – flute
- Krista Hallová – oboe
- Svatopluk Holásek – oboe
- Aleš Pavlorek – clarinet
- Jiří Kundl – clarinet
- Jaroslav Janoštík – bassoon
- Václav Kaniok – bassoon
- František Vyskočil – French horn
- Jiří Zatloukal – French horn
- Josef Číhal – French horn
- Milan Kubát – French horn
- Rudolf Linner – French horn
- Vlastimil Kelar – French horn
- Pavel Skopal – trumpet
- Rostislav Killar – trumpet
- Zdeněk Macek – trumpet
- Ivan Dřínovský – trombone
- Milan Tesař – trombone
- Roman Sklenář – trombone
- Miloslav Žváček – tuba
- Lucie Vápová – harp

Production

- Jeff Easley – cover art
- Petr Pololanik – orchestra conductor
- Marek Obdržálek – choir conductor
- Sascha Paeth – production, engineering, mixing
- Joey DeMaio – executive producer
- Rob LaVaque – editing, engineering
- Phillip Colodetti – editing, engineering
- Bernd Kugler – orchestra and choir recording
- Marc Lenz – orchestra and choir recording
- Jan Wrede – orchestra and choir recording
- Stefan Schmidt – orchestra and choir recording
- Olaf Reitmeier – engineering

== Charts ==
Chart (2006)	Peak position
French Albums (SNEP)	59
German Albums (Offizielle Top 100)	54
Italian Albums (FIMI)	18
Japanese Albums (Oricon)	40
Swiss Albums (Schweizer Hitparade)	74
