= Zero Gravity (Rebirth and Evolution) =

2019 studio album by Turilli / Lione Rhapsody

Studio album by Turilli / Lione Rhapsody
- Released: July 5, 2019
- Recorded: December 2018 – April 2019
- Studio: Domination Studio (San Marino); Fyhr Music Productions (Gothenburg)
- Genre: Symphonic metal; progressive metal
- Length: 53:46
- Label: Nuclear Blast
- Producer: Luca Turilli; Fabio Lione

Singles from Zero Gravity (Rebirth and Evolution)
- 1. "Phoenix Rising" Released: 3 May 2019; 2. "D.N.A. (Demon and Angel)" Released: 7 June 2019; 3. "Zero Gravity" Released: 5 July 2019

Professional ratings
Review scores
Source	Rating
Sonic Perspectives	8.1

Zero Gravity (Rebirth and Evolution) is the only studio album by the Italian symphonic metal band Turilli / Lione Rhapsody. It was released on July 5, 2019 via Nuclear Blast. The album was funded by a crowdfunding campaign that the band had started on Indiegogo.

== Track listing ==
All tracks are written by Luca Turilli.

No.	Title	Length
1.	"Phoenix Rising"	6:15
2.	"D.N.A. (Demon and Angel)" (featuring Elize Ryd)	4:19
3.	"Zero Gravity"	5:53
4.	"Fast Radio Burst"	5:07
5.	"Decoding the Multiverse"	6:19
6.	"Origins"	2:27
7.	"Multidimensional"	4:42
8.	"Amata Immortale"	5:04
9.	"I Am" (featuring Mark Basile)	7:15
10.	"Arcanum (Da Vinci's Enigma)"	6:25
Total length:		53:46

Digipack and vinyl bonus track
No.	Title	Length
11.	"Oceano" (Josh Groban cover) (featuring Sascha Paeth and Arne Wiegand)	4:02
Total length:		57:48

== Personnel ==
All information from the album booklet.

Band members

- Fabio Lione – lead vocals, producer
- Luca Turilli – lead and rhythm guitar, keyboards, producer
- Dominique Leurquin – rhythm guitar, lead guitar
- Patrice Guers – bass guitar
- Alex Holzwarth – drums

Additional musicians

- Elize Ryd – vocals on "D.N.A. (Demon and Angel)"
- Mark Basile – vocals on "I Am", choir vocals
- Sascha Paeth – bass guitar on "Oceano"
- Arne Wiegand – guitars, mandolin, piano on "Oceano"
- Joost van den Broek – keyboards on "Oceano"
- Emilie Ragni – backing vocals, choir vocals
- Alessandro Conti – choir vocals

Production

- Stefan Heilemann – cover art
- Simone Mularoni – recording, mixing, mastering, rhythm guitars, guitar solos on "Fast Radio Burst" and "I Am"
- Kristian Fyhr – recording

== Charts ==
Chart (2019)	Peak position
Belgian Albums (Ultratop Wallonia)	164
French Albums (SNEP)	164
German Albums (Offizielle Top 100)	51
Swiss Albums (Schweizer Hitparade)	43
