= Distant Sky =

Distant Sky may refer to:

- A 2016 song by Rhapsody of Fire from the album Into the Legend
- A 2016 song by Nick Cave and the Bad Seeds from the album Skeleton Tree
