= Glory for Salvation =

2021 album by Rhapsody of Fire

Studio album by Rhapsody of Fire
- Released: 26 November 2021
- Recorded: 2019–2021
- Studio: Bunker Studio (Reggio Emilia); Greenman Studio (Arnsberg)
- Genre: Symphonic metal, power metal
- Length: 65:57
- Label: AFM
- Producer: Alex Staropoli

Rhapsody of Fire studio album chronology
| The Eighth Mountain (2019) | Glory for Salvation (2021) | Challenge the Wind (2024) |

Singles from Glory for Salvation
- 1. "I'll Be Your Hero" Released: 4 June 2021; 2. "Glory for Salvation" Released: 9 July 2021; 3. "Magic Signs" Released: 2 September 2021; 4. "Terial the Hawk" Released: 15 October 2021; 5. "Chains of Destiny" Released: 7 November 2021; 6. "Un'ode per l'eroe" Released: 17 December 2021

Glory for Salvation is the thirteenth studio album by the Italian symphonic power metal band Rhapsody of Fire. It was released on 26 November 2021 via AFM Records.

The album is the second chapter of The Nephilim's Empire Saga. It is the first studio album to feature Paolo Marchesich on drums.

== Background ==
On April 6, 2020, Vocalist Giacomo Voli in an exclusive interview, had revealed that the band were working on the album. Voli said:

"This year we will record the new album and probably start already in the summer. At the end of the tour I will start working on the lyrics with Roby De Micheli because some songs are already in the pre-production phase so they can be released in the spring of next year. As for the development of the saga, we will continue to narrate the events of this strange protagonist who was able to get out of hell thanks to the Nephilim. There are many possible ways and we will see what will happen."

The band later announced that the recording of the album had been completed on 24 September 2020, and were confirmed to be mixing the album with Sebastian "Seeb" Levermann in April 2021. The first single off of the album, "I'll Be Your Hero" was released on 4 June 2021 as an EP. The album's details and release date were later announced on 8 July 2021, along with the release of the second single and title song "Glory for Salvation". The third single, "Magic Signs" was released on 2 September 2021. The fourth single, "Terial the Hawk", was released on 15 October 2021. The fifth single, "Chains of Destiny" was released on 7 November 2021, along with a music video. The sixth single, "Un'ode per l'eroe" was released on 17 December 2021, along with a music video.

== Composition ==
=== Influences, style and themes ===
According to Staropoli, the song "Chains of Destiny" is "an epic, uplifting and intense song, characterized by catchy melodies, fast paced rhythm, great vocals and choirs".

== Track listing ==
All lyrics are written by Giacomo Voli; all music is composed by Alex Staropoli, Giacomo Voli and Roberto de Micheli.

| No. | Title | Length |
|---|---|---|
| 1. | "Son of Vengeance" | 5:46 |
| 2. | "The Kingdom of Ice" | 4:25 |
| 3. | "Glory for Salvation" | 5:04 |
| 4. | "Eternal Snow" | 1:33 |
| 5. | "Terial the Hawk" | 4:49 |
| 6. | "Maid of the Secret Sand" | 5:07 |
| 7. | "Abyss of Pain II" | 10:44 |
| 8. | "Infinitae Gloriae" ("Infinite Glory") | 4:31 |
| 9. | "Magic Signs" | 4:52 |
| 10. | "I'll Be Your Hero" | 5:29 |
| 11. | "Chains of Destiny" | 3:55 |
| Total length: | | 56:15 |

Bonus tracks
| No. | Title | Length |
|---|---|---|
| 12. | "Un'ode per l'eroe" ("An Ode to the Hero") | 4:51 |
| 13. | "La Esencia de un Rey" ("The Essence of a King") | 4:51 |
| Total length: | | 65:57 |

Japanese bonus track
| No. | Title | Length |
|---|---|---|
| 14. | "Sadame No Kusari" ("Chains of Destiny") | 3:55 |
| Total length: | | 69:52 |

== Personnel ==
Credits for Glory for Salvation adapted from liner notes.

Rhapsody of Fire

- Alex Staropoli – keyboards, orchestrations, choir vocals, engineering, production
- Roberto De Micheli – guitars
- Alessandro Sala – bass
- Giacomo Voli – lead and choir vocals
- Paolo Marchesich – drums

Additional personnel

- Manuel Staropoli – baroque recorders, flute
- Giovanni Davoli – uilleann pipes, low whistle
- Davide Simonelli – violin
- Mateo Sivelli – cello
- Valerio Mauro – harp

Choir

- Alex Mari, Angelo Guidetti, Erika Beretti, Gabriele Gozzi, Giacomo Pieracci, Giovani Maria Palmia

Production

- Sebastian "Seeb" Levermann – mixing, mastering
- Alberto Bravin – engineering, choir vocals
- Marco Vattovani – engineering
- Alexandre Charleux – artwork
- Paul Thureau – additional artwork, layout
- Emanuele Aliprandi – photography

== Charts ==
| Chart (2021) | Peak position |
|---|---|
| German Albums (Offizielle Top 100) | 89 |
| Swiss Albums (Schweizer Hitparade) | 31 |
