= Challenge the Wind =

2024 album by Rhapsody of Fire

Studio album by Rhapsody of Fire
- Released: 31 May 2024
- Recorded: 2022–2023
- Studio: Greenman Studio (Arnsberg)
- Genres: Symphonic metal; power metal
- Length: 63:27
- Label: AFM
- Producer: Alex Staropoli

Rhapsody of Fire studio album chronology
Glory for Salvation (2021)	Challenge the Wind (2024)

Singles from Challenge the Wind
- 1. "Kreel's Magic Staff" Released: 12 May 2023; 2. "Challenge the Wind" Released: 29 February 2024; 3. "A Brave New Hope" Released: 29 March 2024; 4. "Diamond Claws" Released: 3 May 2024; 5. "Mastered by the Dark" Released: 31 May 2024

Challenge the Wind is the fourteenth studio album by the Italian symphonic power metal band Rhapsody of Fire. It was released on 31 May 2024 via AFM Records and was produced by Alex Staropoli, the band's keyboardist. The album is the third chapter of The Nephilim's Empire Saga.

== Track listing ==
All tracks are written by Alex Staropoli, Giacomo Voli and Roberto De Micheli.

Challenge the Wind track listing
No.	Title	Length
1.	"Challenge the Wind"	4:55
2.	"Whispers of Doom"	4:57
3.	"The Bloody Pariah"	4:53
4.	"Vanquished by Shadows"	16:12
5.	"Kreel's Magic Staff"	6:10
6.	"Diamond Claws"	4:36
7.	"Black Wizard"	5:10
8.	"A Brave New Hope"	4:40
9.	"Holy Downfall"	6:54
10.	"Mastered by the Dark"	4:53
Total length:		63:27

Japanese bonus track
No.	Title	Length
11.	"Challenge the Wind" (Japanese version)	4:55
Total length:		68:15

== Personnel ==
Credits for Challenge the Wind adapted from liner notes.

Rhapsody of Fire

- Alex Staropoli – keyboards, backing vocals, orchestral arrangements, engineering, production
- Roberto De Micheli – guitars
- Alessandro Sala – bass
- Giacomo Voli – lead and choir vocals
- Paolo Marchesich – drums

Additional musicians

- Manuel Staropoli – baroque recorder
- Giovanni Davoli – uilleann pipes, low whistle

Choir

- Raffaele Albanese, Paolo Ribaldini, Alberto Bravin, Ivan Huecco

Production

- Sebastian "Seeb" Levermann – engineering, mixing, mastering
- Dennis Koehne – mixing
- Ville Assinen – cover art
- Josip Mihic – layout

== Charts ==
Chart performance for Challenge the Wind
Chart (2024)	Peak position
Japanese Hot Albums (Billboard Japan)	94
Swiss Albums (Schweizer Hitparade)	36
