= King of the Nordic Twilight =

1999 album by Luca Turilli

Studio album by Luca Turilli
- Released: 22 September 1999
- Recorded: Sascha Paeth Studio and Gate Studio, Wolfsburg, Germany, April–June 1999
- Genre: Symphonic power metal
- Length: 48:01
- Label: Limb Music/SPV
- Producer: Sascha Paeth & Miro

Luca Turilli chronology
The Ancient Forest of Elves EP (1999)	King of the Nordic Twilight (1999)	Prophet of the Last Eclipse (2002)

Professional ratings
Review scores
Source	Rating
AllMusic	3/5 stars

King of the Nordic Twilight is the debut studio album by the Italian musician Luca Turilli. It was released in 1999 through Limb Music Productions.

Track 11 is unlisted on any form of the album. It is an a cappella rendition of a traditional Icelandic song by soprano Rannveig Sif Sigurdardottir. Sometimes the track is referred to by her name, or as "Lullaby", but the real name of this song is "Sofðu unga ástin mín" ("Sleep My Little Loved One")

A limited edition of the album was released as a digibook with an expanded booklet. A video for the song "The Ancient Forest of Elves" is included as a hidden feature on the disc.

== Track listing ==
All lyrics are written by Luca Turilli; all music is composed by Luca Turilli.

No.	Title	Length
1.	"To Magic Horizons"	1:21
2.	"Black Dragon"	5:05
3.	"Legend of Steel"	5:21
4.	"Lord of the Winter Snow"	6:05
5.	"Princess Aurora"	3:47
6.	"The Ancient Forest of Elves"	4:43
7.	"Throne of Ice"	1:51
8.	"Where Heroes Lie"	4:24
9.	"Warriors Pride"	3:47
10.	"Kings of the Nordic Twilight"	11:37
Total length:		48:01

Hidden track
No.	Title	Length
11.	"Sofðu Unga Ástin Min" ("Sleep My Little Loved One")	2:12
Total length:		50:13

Japanese bonus track
No.	Title	Length
12.	"Knight of Immortal Fire"	5:11
Total length:		55:24

== Credits ==
Band members

- Luca Turilli — guitars, additional keyboards
- Olaf Hayer — lead and backing vocals
- Sascha Paeth — bass, acoustic and additional guitars, guitar solo on "Where Heroes Lie", producer, engineer, mixing, mastering
- Miro — keyboards, piano, harpsichord, producer, choir arrangements and conduction
- Robert Hunecke-Rizzo — drums

Additional musicians

- Opera Choir:
  - Sonja Pallasch, Heidrun Brockoff, Rosina Herrera-Sicilia, Ewald Bayerschmidt, Georg Mihalinov, Karl Heinz Kinsel, Jasinsky, Enrike Ochmann
- Rannveig Sif Sigurdardottir - soprano voice
- Epic Choir:
  - Thomas Rettke, Robert Hunecke-Rizzo, Cinzia Rizzo, Kirsten Metzing, Miro, Olaf Hayer
- Matthias Brommann - first violin
- Annette Berryman - flute
- Bettina Jhrig - viola
- Lord James David - narrator

== Charts ==
Chart (1999)	Peak position
German Albums (Offizielle Top 100)	53
