= Into the Legend =

Studio album by Rhapsody of Fire
- Released: 15 January 2016
- Recorded: 2015
- Genre: Symphonic power metal
- Length: 66:42
- Label: AFM Records
- Producer: Alex Staropoli

Rhapsody of Fire studio album chronology
Dark Wings of Steel (2013)	Into the Legend (2016)	The Eighth Mountain (2019)

Professional ratings
Review scores
Source	Rating
Angry Metal Guy	3.5/5 stars
Metalholic	4.5/5 stars
Metalstorm	4.1/5 stars
Nightfall in Metal Earth	4.1/5 stars

Into the Legend is the eleventh studio album by the Italian symphonic power metal band Rhapsody of Fire. It was released on 15 January 2016 via AFM Records.

It is the first album with bassist Alessandro Sala, and the final album with longtime members Fabio Lione on vocals and Alex Holzwarth on drums.

== Track listing ==
All lyrics are written by Fabio Lione; all music is composed by Roberto De Micheli, Alex Staropoli and Manuel Staropoli.

No.	Title	Length
1.	"In principio" (In the Beginning)	2:45
2.	"Distant Sky"	4:32
3.	"Into the Legend"	5:01
4.	"Winter's Rain"	7:44
5.	"A Voice in the Cold Wind"	6:18
6.	"Valley of Shadows"	6:54
7.	"Shining Star"	4:39
8.	"Realms of Light"	6:00
9.	"Rage of Darkness"	6:02
10.	"The Kiss of Life"	16:45
Total length:		66:40

Digipak edition bonus track
No.	Title	Length
11.	"Volar Sin Dolor" ("Flying Without Pain", Spanish version of Shining Star)	4:38
Total length:		71:18

Japanese edition bonus track
No.	Title	Length
11.	"Speranze e Amor" ("Hopes and Love", Italian version of Shining Star)	4:38
Total length:		71:18

== Personnel ==
Rhapsody of Fire

- Fabio Lione – lead vocals
- Roberto De Micheli – guitar
- Alessandro Sala – bass
- Alex Staropoli – keyboards, production
- Alex Holzwarth – drums

Additional musicians

- Manuel Staropoli – recorder, flute, crumhorn, oboe, duduk
- Matteo Brenci – guitars (7)
- Luca Balbo – piano (7)
- Elisa Frausin – cello
- Bayarma Rinchinova – flute
- Teodora Tommasi – harp
- Manuel Tomadin – harpsichord
- Luca Ventimiglia – musette, uilleann pipes, crumhorn
- Paolo Monetti – violone
- Macedonian Radio Symphonic Orchestra – orchestra
- Manuela Kriscak, Noémi Boros, Paola Marra – soprano vocals
- Elisa Verzier – alto vocals
- Riccardo Rados – tenor vocals
- Hao Wang, Matjaž Zobec – bass vocals

Choir

- Giacomo Voli, Beatrice Blaskovic, Caterina Lanza, Elisa Blaskovic, Erin Dorci, Sofia Rosie Mayer, Virginia Lanza, Davide Moras, Fabio Sambenini, Gabriele Gozzi, Paolo Ribaldini

Production

- Alberto Bravin – editing, engineering, mixing
- Atanas Babaleski – engineering
- Giorgi Hristovski – engineering
- Fulvio Zafred – engineering
- Maor Appelbaum – mastering
- Felipe Machado Franco – artwork, layout
- Daniele Peluso – photography
- Stefania Seculin – choir conductor
- Vito Lo Re – orchestra conductor

== Charts ==
Chart (2016)	Peak position
Belgian Albums (Ultratop Wallonia)	145
French Albums (SNEP)	157
German Albums (Offizielle Top 100)	90
Italian Albums (FIMI)	76
Japanese Albums (Oricon)	78
Swiss Albums (Schweizer Hitparade)	34
