= Dawn of Victory =

Studio album by Rhapsody
- Released: October 30, 2000
- Recorded: June – August 2000
- Genre: Symphonic power metal; neoclassical metal
- Length: 48:25
- Label: Limb Music
- Producer: Sascha Paeth and Michael Rodenberg

Rhapsody studio album chronology
Symphony of Enchanted Lands (1998)	Dawn of Victory (2000)	Rain of a Thousand Flames (2001)

Singles from Dawn of Victory
- 1. "Holy Thunderforce" Released: September 20, 2000

Professional ratings
Review scores
Source	Rating
AllMusic	2.5/5 stars
Metal Rules	4.5/5 stars
Sputnikmusic	4/5 stars

Dawn of Victory is the third studio album by the Italian symphonic power metal band Rhapsody, released in 2000. Like the previous albums, it centers on the story of Algalord and The Emerald Sword Saga. It was produced and engineered by Sascha Paeth and Miro. It is also the first album to feature drummer Alex Holzwarth.

In 2019, Metal Hammer ranked it as the second best power metal album of all time.

== Track listing ==
All lyrics are written by Luca Turilli; all music is composed by Turilli and Alex Staropoli, except where noted.

No.	Title	Music	Length
1.	"Lux Triumphans" ("Triumphant Light")	Staropoli	2:00
2.	"Dawn of Victory"		4:46
3.	"Triumph for My Magic Steel"		5:46
4.	"The Village of Dwarves"		3:52
5.	"Dargor, Shadowlord of the Black Mountain"		4:47
6.	"The Bloody Rage of the Titans"		6:23
7.	"Holy Thunderforce"		4:21
8.	"Trolls in the Dark"	Turilli	2:32
9.	"The Last Winged Unicorn"		5:43
10.	"The Mighty Ride of the Firelord"		9:15
Total length:			48:25

The album was also made available in a Digipak edition containing a bonus disc with several extra tracks.

Digipack edition CD 2 bonus tracks
No.	Title	Writer(s)	Length
1.	"Guardians" (Helloween Cover)	Michael Weikath	4:20
2.	"The Mighty Ride of the Firelord (Edit Version)"		4:46
3.	"Holy Thunderforce (Alternate Version)"		4:20
4.	"Triumph for My Magic Steel (Alternate Version)"		5:46
5.	"Dargor, Shadowlord of the Black Mountain (Extended Version)"		8:32
Total length:			27:44

The bonus disc also contained a multimedia track featuring:

- Holy Thunderforce (video clip)
- Epicus Furor – Emerald Sword (video clip)
- Wisdom Of The Kings (video clip)
- Algalord Chronicles I, II & III
- Photo Gallery
- Track Commentary
- History
- Screensaver (for PC use only)

== Credits ==
- Luca Turilli – Guitars
- Fabio Lione – Vocals
- Alex Staropoli – Keyboards
- Alessandro Lotta – Bass
- Alex Holzwarth – Drums

=== Guest musicians ===
- Epic choirs – Robert Hunecke-Rizzo, Thomas Rettke, Miro Rodenberg, Cinzia Rizzo, Florinda Klevisser
- Church Choirs – Helmstedt Kammerchoir conducted by Andreas Lamken
- Female Baroque voice – Constanze Backes
- Childish voice on "Trolls in the Dark" – Laurence Vanryne
- Baroque recorders – Manuel Staropoli
- Lead Violin – Maggie Ardorf
- Guest Drums – Thunderforce

== Charts ==
Chart (2000)	Peak position
Finnish Albums (Suomen virallinen lista)	39
French Albums (SNEP)	56
German Albums (Offizielle Top 100)	32
Italian Albums (FIMI)	49
Swedish Albums (Sverigetopplistan)	39
