= Power of the Dragonflame =

Studio album by Rhapsody
- Released: 18 March 2002
- Recorded: September–November 2001
- Studio: Gate & Pathway Studios, Wolfsburg, Germany
- Genre: Symphonic power metal; neoclassical metal
- Length: 61:06
- Label: Limb Music
- Producer: Sascha Paeth, Miro

Rhapsody studio album chronology
Rain of a Thousand Flames (2001)	Power of the Dragonflame (2002)	Symphony of Enchanted Lands II – The Dark Secret (2004)

Professional ratings
Review scores
Source	Rating
AllMusic	2.5/5 stars
Metal Rules	5/5 stars

Power of the Dragonflame is the fifth studio album by the Italian symphonic power metal band Rhapsody. It is also the last chapter in the Emerald Sword Saga.

The album was originally released by the german label Limb Music on 18 March 2002 in Europe and a month later, on 23 April 2002, in the United States.

In 2017, the online music magazine Loudwire ranked it as the 9th best power metal album of all time.

== Track listing ==
All lyrics are written by Luca Turilli; all music is composed by Alex Staropoli and Turilli, except where noted.

No.	Title	Music	Length
1.	"In Tenebris" (In Darkness)	Staropoli	1:29
2.	"Knightrider of Doom"		3:57
3.	"Power of the Dragonflame"		4:27
4.	"The March of the Swordmaster"		5:04
5.	"When Demons Awake"		6:47
6.	"Agony Is My Name"		4:58
7.	"Lamento eroico" (Heroic Cry)		4:39
8.	"Steelgods of the Last Apocalypse"		5:48
9.	"The Pride of the Tyrant"		4:51
10.	"Gargoyles, Angels of Darkness" I. "Angeli di Pietra Mistica" (Angels of Mystical Stone) - 9:56; II. "Warlords' Last Challenge" (Instrumental) - 1:25 III. "...And the Legend Ends..." - 7:42"	Staropoli, Turilli, Sascha Paeth	19:03
Total length:			61:06

Limited edition bonus track
No.	Title	Length
10.	"Rise from the Sea of Flames"	3:59

== Personnel ==
=== Rhapsody ===
- Fabio Lione – vocals
- Luca Turilli – lead and rhythm guitars
- Alex Staropoli – keyboards, harpsichord, piano, orchestral arrangements
- Alex Holzwarth – drums (Note: Alex Holzwarth is credited in the liner notes and appears in the photo shoots for the album, but accourding to some sources he did not participate on the recordings for this album)

=== Additional personnel ===
- Michael "Miro" Rodenberg – producer
- Sascha Paeth – producer, bass, classical guitar (track 11)
- Dana Lurie – lead violin
- Johannes Monno – classical guitar (track 11)
- Thunderforce – additional drums
- Herbie Langhans, Cinzia Rizzo, Robert Hunecke-Rizzo, Oliver Hartmann, Miro – choir (epic)
- Previn Moore and Bridget Fogle – choir (church)
- Bridget Fogle – female baroque voice
- Manuel Staropoli – baroque recorders
- Jay Lansford – narration

== Charts ==
Chart (2002)	Peak position
Finnish Albums (Suomen virallinen lista)	31
French Albums (SNEP)	34
German Albums (Offizielle Top 100)	30
Italian Albums (FIMI)	15
Swedish Albums (Sverigetopplistan)	29
