= Constanze Backes =

German soprano

- Born: Bochum, North Rhine-Westphalia, Germany
- Education: Folkwang-Hochschule
- Occupation: Classical soprano
- Years active: 1993-present
- Website: Official website

Constanze Backes is a classically trained German soprano in opera and concert. She has toured throughout Europe and performed in many classical genres but over the last few years has focused primarily on Early music. In addition she teaches children music technique and has translated musical works.

== Career ==
Constanze Backes was born in Bochum, North Rhine-Westphalia, Germany. She began her music studies at the Folkwang-Hochschule in Essen. Later, she studied privately with Jessica Cash in London and Hea-Soon Park.

In 1993, performing with John Eliot Gardiner, Backes appeared as Barbarina in Mozart's Le nozze di Figaro at the Théâtre du Châtelet of Paris, at the Royal Concertgebouw in Amsterdam, and recorded it for Deutsche Grammophon Archiv. She recorded with Gardiner also for Deutsche Grammophon Valetto in Monteverdi's L'incoronazione di Poppea and Papagena in Mozart's Zauberflöte.

Backes won the 1996 Lady-Nixon-Förderpreis for young singers and joined the Monteverdi Choir. She sang at the 1998 Göttingen Handel Festival, performing vocal chamber music by Handel and Domenico Scarlatti accompanied by Jacob Heringman on vihuela, harpsichordist Ludger Rémy and cellist Katie Rietman, singing arias from Handel's Sosarme and Tamerlano.

Other opera productions have included Reinhard Keiser's The Temple of Janus in Berlin's Hebbel am Ufer, Johann Adolph Hasse's Larinda e Vanesio at the Margravial Opera House, and a production of Purcell's King Arthur for the Ruhrtriennale 2003. She performed Proserpina in Monteverdi's L'Orfeo in the Festspielhaus Baden-Baden and in 2004 sang madrigals by Carlo Gesualdo and Monteverdi with conductor Thomas Hengelbrock at the Schwetzingen Festival.

In 2006, Backes sang in the program "Wege zu Mozart" with the Marais Consort in several engagements throughout Germany. She recorded Samuel Scheidt: The Great Sacred Concertos in 2007 with conductor Roland Wilson, alongside Monika Mauch, Markus Brutscher, Werner Buchin, Wolf Matthias Friedrich, Wilfried Jochens and Harry van der Kamp. She sang madrigals by Monteverdi with Wilson in a series of performances throughout the 2008/09 season. Performing with Passion of Cuivres in 2009, Backes sang La Comedie et la Mort at the Uckermärkische Musikwochen in the Uckermark In 2012, Backes premiered Joseph Schuster's re-discovered opera Il Marito Indolente at the festival Regensburg Tage Alter Musik.

In 2014, in collaboration with Stefan Horz, Backes recorded The Biography of Love, a selection of love songs from six different centuries based on their long collaboration. She has sung with ensembles such as Deutsche Händelsolisten, Gabrieli Consort, Gesualdo Consort Amsterdam, Israel Camerata Orchestra, Musica Fiata and Ensemble Weser-Renaissance Bremen, throughout Europe, including venues in Amsterdam, Aranjuez, Lisbon, London, Paris, Parma, Rome, Santiago de Compostela and York.

Backes has translated several theatrical and literary works and has taught children's music. She has taught the Wuppertal Boys’ Choir, and works with the Düsseldorf "Singpause", which trains schoolchildren in music techniques.
