= Rain of a Thousand Flames =

Studio album by Rhapsody
- Released: 29 October 2001
- Recorded: January – March 2001, Gate Studio, Wolfsburg, Germany
- Genres: Symphonic power metal; neoclassical metal
- Length: 41:56
- Label: Limb Music
- Producers: Sascha Paeth, Miro

Rhapsody studio album chronology
Dawn of Victory (2000)	Rain of a Thousand Flames (2001)	Power of the Dragonflame (2002)

Professional ratings
Review scores
Source	Rating
AllMusic	2.5/5 stars

Rain of a Thousand Flames is the fourth studio album by the Italian symphonic power metal band Rhapsody, released in 2001. It tells a part of The Emerald Sword Saga, but it is a parallel episode that is not essential to the story, taking place shortly after Dawn of Victory. While the Warrior of Ice is away, Akron uses the newly acquired Emerald Sword to ravage the land. The album was released at a reduced price and is considered a stop gap between the band's main releases.

== Track listing ==
All lyrics are written by Luca Turilli; all music is composed by Turilli and Alex Staropoli, except when noted in "credits".

No.	Title	Length
1.	"Rain of a Thousand Flames"	3:43
2.	"Deadly Omen"	1:48
3.	"Queen of the Dark Horizons"	13:42
4.	"Tears of a Dying Angel"	6:22
5.	"Elnor's Magic Valley"	1:40
6.	"The Poem's Evil Page"	4:04
7.	"The Wizard's Last Rhymes"	10:37
Total length:		41:56

== Credits ==
Credits adapted from the album's liner notes and Discogs release page.

=== Band members ===
- Luca Turilli - guitars.
- Fabio Lione - lead and backing vocals.
- Alex Staropoli - keyboards, harpsichord, piano, orchestral arrangement.
- Alessandro Lotta - bass.
- Alex Holzwarth - drums.

=== Additional musicians ===
- Bridget Fogle, Previn Moore - "church choir" vocals.
- Olaf Hayer, Oliver Hartmann, Robert Hunecke-Rizzo, Tobias Sammet - "epic choir" vocals.
- Jay Lansford - male narrator.
- Nadja Bellir - female narrator.
- Manuel Staropoli - baroque recorder.
- Dana Lurie - violin.

=== Additional notes ===
- The chorus in "Queen of the Dark Horizons" is based on the main theme of the horror picture Phenomena, by the Italian 1970s prog rock band Goblin.
- "Elnor's Magic Valley" is based on an Irish traditional music called Cooley's Reel
- "The Wizard's Last Rhymes" is based on the fourth movement of the New World Symphony by Antonín Dvořák.
- Tracks 4–7 are grouped with the name "Rhymes of a Tragic Poem - The Gothic Saga".

== Charts ==
Chart (2001)	Peak position
French Albums (SNEP)	117
