= Symphony of Enchanted Lands =

Studio album by Rhapsody
- Released: October 5, 1998
- Recorded: 1998
- Studios: Gate Studio, Wolfsburg, Germany
- Genres: Symphonic power metal; neoclassical metal
- Length: 55:42
- Label: Limb Music
- Producers: Sascha Paeth and Miro

Rhapsody studio album chronology
Legendary Tales (1997)	Symphony of Enchanted Lands (1998)	Dawn of Victory (2000)

Singles from Symphony of Enchanted Lands
- 1. "Emerald Sword" Released: September 9, 1998

Professional ratings
Review scores
Source	Rating
Allmusic	3/5 stars

Symphony of Enchanted Lands is the second studio album by the Italian symphonic power metal band Rhapsody, released on October 5, 1998 on Limb Music. It is the second part of the Emerald Sword Saga.

== Track listing ==
All lyrics are written by Luca Turilli; all music is composed by Turilli and Alex Staropoli.

No.	Title	Length
1.	"Epicus Furor" ("Epic Fury")	1:14
2.	"Emerald Sword"	4:20
3.	"Wisdom of the Kings"	4:28
4.	"Heroes of the Lost Valley"; I. "Entering the Waterfalls' Realm" (instrumental); II. "The Dragon's Pride"	2:04: 1:20; 0:45
5.	"Eternal Glory"	7:29
6.	"Beyond the Gates of Infinity"	7:23
7.	"Wings of Destiny"	4:28
8.	"The Dark Tower of Abyss"	6:46
9.	"Riding the Winds of Eternity"	4:13
10.	"Symphony of Enchanted Lands"; I. "Tharos' Last Flight"; II. "Hymn of the Warrior"; III. "Rex Tremende"; IV. "The Immortal Fire"	13:17: 1:00; 3:05; 6:31; 2:41
Total length:		55:42

== Personnel ==
=== Band members ===
- Fabio Lione - lead & backing vocals
- Luca Turilli - electric & acoustic guitars, part of the choirs
- Alex Staropoli - keyboards, harpsichord, piano, part of the choirs
- Alessandro Lotta - bass
- Daniele Carbonera - drums and percussion

=== Guest musicians ===
- Sascha Paeth - acoustic guitars, mandolin, balalaika
- Don Kosaken - Russian choirs
- Helmstedter Kammerchor, conducted by Andreas Lamken - sacred choirs
- Thomas Rettke, Robert Hunecke-Rizzo, Ricky Rizzo, Cinzia Rizzo, Tatiana Bloch, Davide Calabrese, Michele Mayer, Giuliano Tarlon, Cristiano Adacher, Manuel Staropoli - choirs
- Constanze Backes - female baroque voice on "Symphony of Enchanted Lands"
- Sir Jay Lansford - Narrator spoken parts
- Erik Steenbock - marching drums
- Manuel Staropoli - baroque recorders & baroque oboe
- Matthias Brommann - lead violin
- Claas Harders - viola da gamba
- Ulrike Wildenhof, Almut Schlicker, Stefanie Holk, Friedrike Bauer, Matthias Brommann - violins
- Marie-Theres Strumpf, Cosima Bergk, Jan Larsen - violas
- Hagen Kuhr - cello
- Andre Neygenfind - contrabass
- Stefan Horz - harpsichord

=== Production ===
- Produced by Sascha Paeth and Miro.
- Engineered, mixed and mastered by Sascha Paeth and Miro at Gate Studio in Wolfsburg, Germany
- All Artwork by: Eric Philippe
- Photography by: Karsten Koch, Hannover

== Charts ==
Chart (1998)	Peak position
German Albums (Offizielle Top 100)	54
Italian Albums (FIMI)	66
