= Legendary Tales =

Studio album by Rhapsody
- Released: October 27, 1997
- Recorded: April – May 1997, Gate Studio, Wolfsburg, Germany
- Genres: Symphonic power metal; neoclassical metal
- Length: 45:28
- Label: Limb Music
- Producers: Sascha Paeth and Miro

Rhapsody studio album chronology
Legendary Tales (1997)	Symphony of Enchanted Lands (1998)

Legendary Tales is the debut studio album by the Italian symphonic power metal band Rhapsody. It was released on October 27, 1997 on Limb Music. The album is the beginning of the Emerald Sword Saga.

== Track listing ==
All lyrics are written by Luca Turilli (including Algalord's Concept); all music is composed by Turilli and Alex Staropoli.

No.	Title	Length
1.	"Ira Tenax" (Tenacious Rage)	1:13
2.	"Warrior of Ice"	5:57
3.	"Rage of the Winter"	6:12
4.	"Forest of Unicorns"	3:24
5.	"Flames of Revenge"	5:34
6.	"Virgin Skies"	1:20
7.	"Land of Immortals"	4:53
8.	"Echoes of Tragedy"	3:32
9.	"Lord of the Thunder"	5:34
10.	"Legendary Tales"	7:49
Total length:		45:28

== Personnel ==
=== Band members ===
- Fabio Lione - vocals
- Luca Turilli - guitars
- Alex Staropoli - keyboards
- Daniele Carbonera - drums

=== Guest musicians ===
- Sascha Paeth - bass, acoustic guitars, mandolin
- Robert Hunecke - bass
- Manuel Staropoli - baroque recorder
- Thomas Rettke, Cinzia Rizzo - backing vocals
- Thomas Rettke, Robert Hunecke, Miro, Wolfgang Herbst, Rick Rizzo, Fabio Lione, Luca Turilli, Alex Staropoli, Cinzia Rizzo, Tatiana Bloch - Choir of Immortals
- Anne Schnyder - lead violin
- Anne Schnyder & Helia Davis - violins
- Oliver Kopf - viola
- Paul F. Boehnke - cello
- Andre Neygenfind - contra bass

== Production ==
- Produced by Sascha Paeth and Miro
- Engineered and mixed by Sascha Paeth and Miro at Gate-Studio in Wolfsburg, Germany.
- Cover art and logo design: Eric Philippe
- Photography: Karsten Koch, Hannover
