= Magic Circle Music =

American record label

- Founded: 2005
- Founder: Joey DeMaio
- Genre: Heavy metal
- Country of origin: U.S.
- Official website: magiccirclemusic.com (defunct)

Magic Circle Music is a heavy metal record label founded by Manowar bassist Joey DeMaio in 2005 named after Richard Wagner's Der Ring des Nibelungen. The purpose of the label is to give the band (Manowar) creative control. Furthermore, it is stated on their website that they (Manowar) saw many other bands "fall to the perils of greed and commercialization in the music industry". To put an end to this practice, DeMaio founded Magic Circle Music through which he felt he could help other developing artists avoid these traps.

Apart from releasing band merchandise, the label is also responsible for organizing the Magic Circle Festival, which first took place in 2007 in Bad Arolsen, Germany.

In 2008, there was a legal dispute between Rhapsody of Fire and Magic Circle Music. The band returned to Nuclear Blast afterwards.

== Roster ==
- Bludgeon
- David Shankle Group
- Feinstein
- Guardians of the Flame
- Jack Starr's Burning Starr
- Luca Turilli
- Luca Turilli's Dreamquest
- Majesty
- Manowar
- Rhapsody of Fire

== See also ==
- Manowar discography
