= Rhapsody of Fire =

Italian symphonic power metal band

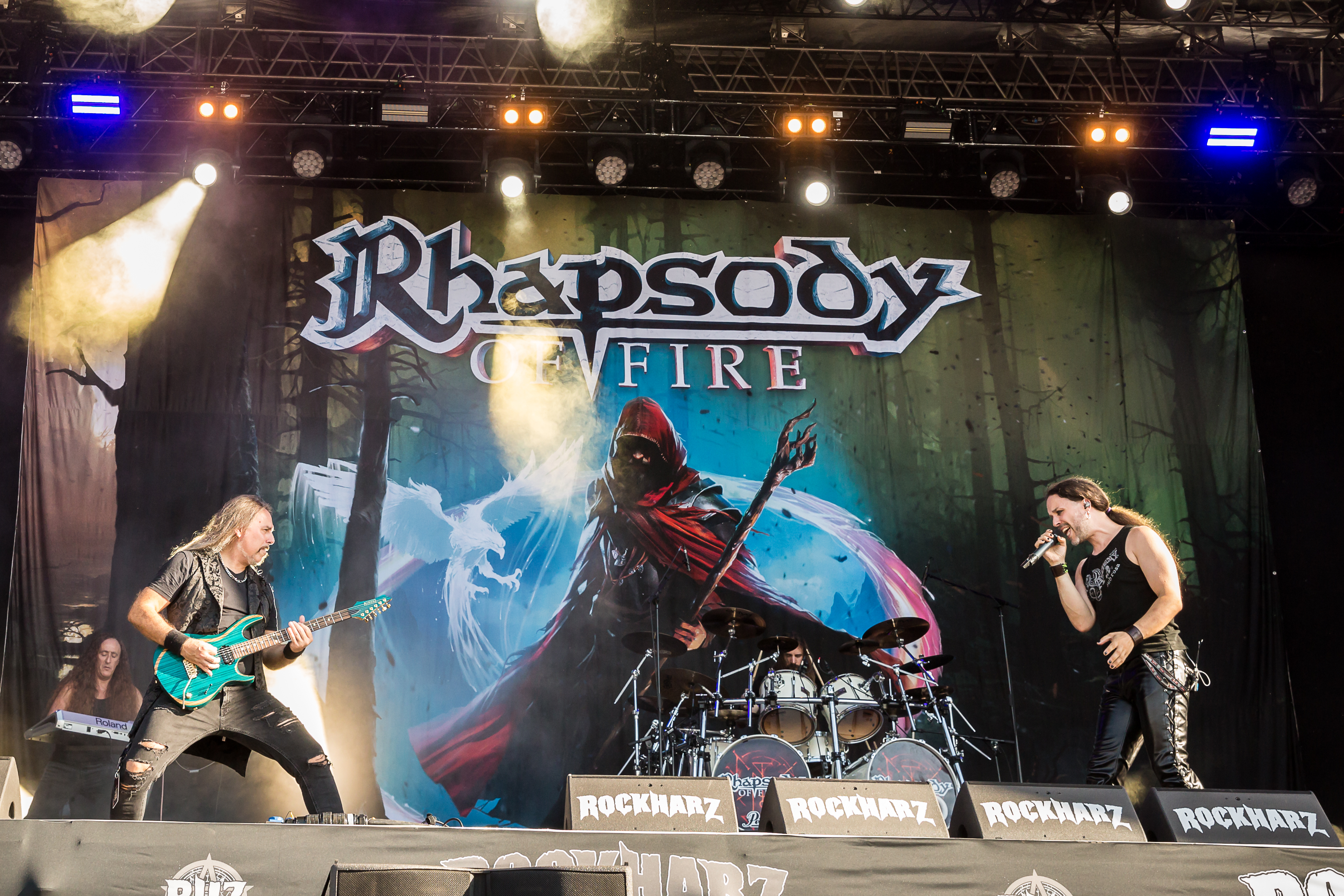
- Rhapsody of Fire performing at Rockharz 2025

Background information
- Also known as: Thundercross (1993–1995); Rhapsody (1995–2006)
- Origin: Trieste, Italy
- Genres: Symphonic power metal; neoclassical metal
- Years active: 1993–present
- Labels: AFM; Limb; Magic Circle; SPV; Nuclear Blast
- Spinoffs: Luca Turilli's Rhapsody; Turilli / Lione Rhapsody
- Members: Alex Staropoli; Roberto De Micheli; Alessandro Sala; Giacomo Voli; Paolo Marchesich
- Past members: See former members
- Website: www.rhapsodyoffire.com

Rhapsody of Fire (formerly known as Rhapsody) is an Italian symphonic power metal band formed in Trieste by guitarist Luca Turilli and keyboardist Alex Staropoli. The band is widely considered a pioneer of the symphonic power metal subgenre. Originally formed in 1993 as Thundercross, the band released albums under the moniker Rhapsody before changing their name to Rhapsody of Fire in 2006 due to trademark issues. The band is known for their fantasy concept albums for both the Emerald Sword Saga and the Dark Secret Saga.

In 2011, following the release of From Chaos to Eternity, which ended The Dark Secret Saga, founding guitarist Turilli left the band after 18 years. Long-term members Fabio Lione and Alex Holzwarth left the band in 2016. Staropoli continued the band and formed a new lineup with guitarist Roberto De Micheli, bassist Alessandro Sala, vocalist Giacomo Voli and drummer Paolo Marchesich, and began a concept album saga called the Nephilim's Empire Saga, with the albums The Eighth Mountain, Glory for Salvation and Challenge the Wind that were released in 2019, 2021 and 2024 respectively.

As of 2026, the band has released fourteen studio albums, two live albums, three EPs, and a live DVD.

== History ==
=== 1993–1997: Early years ===
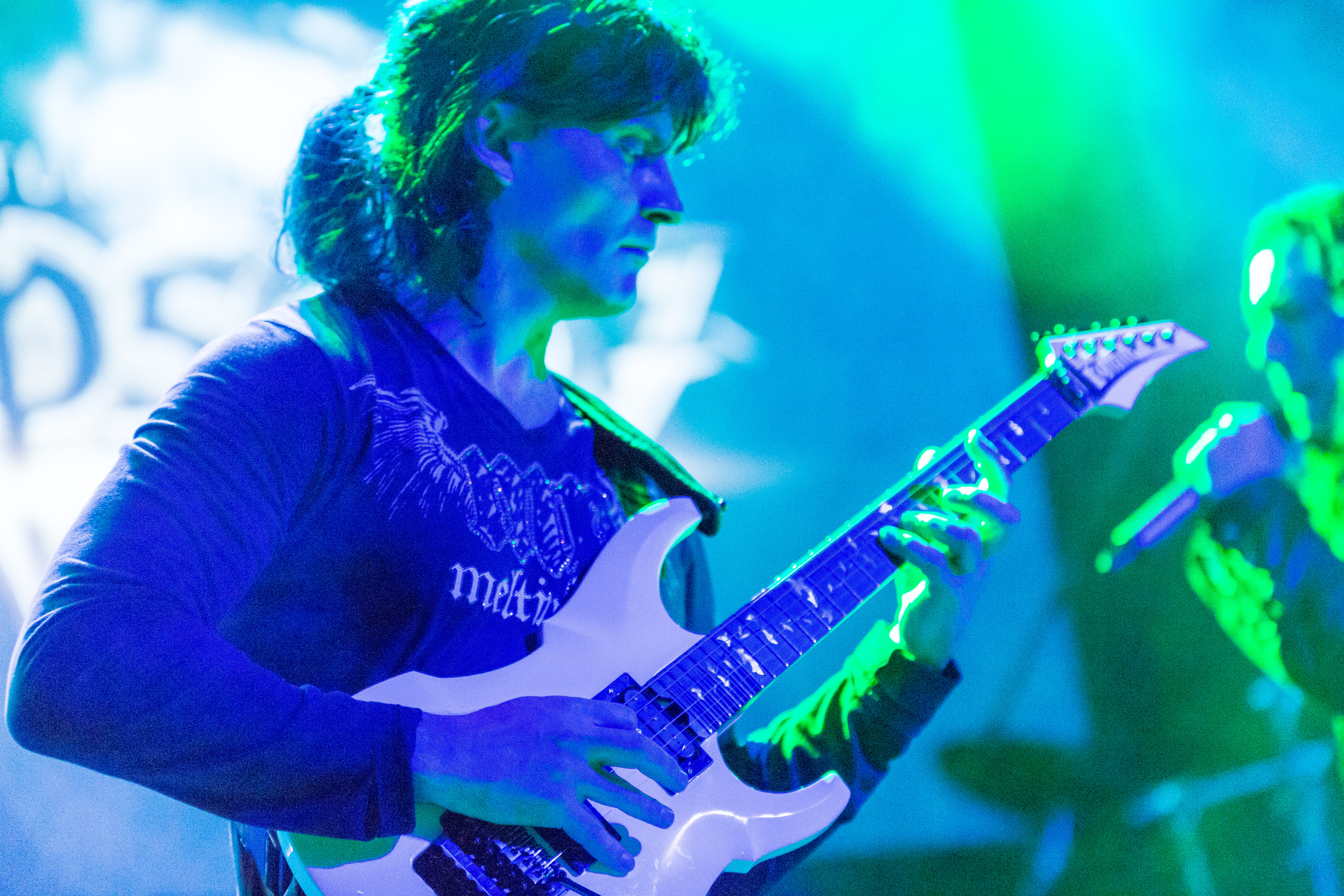
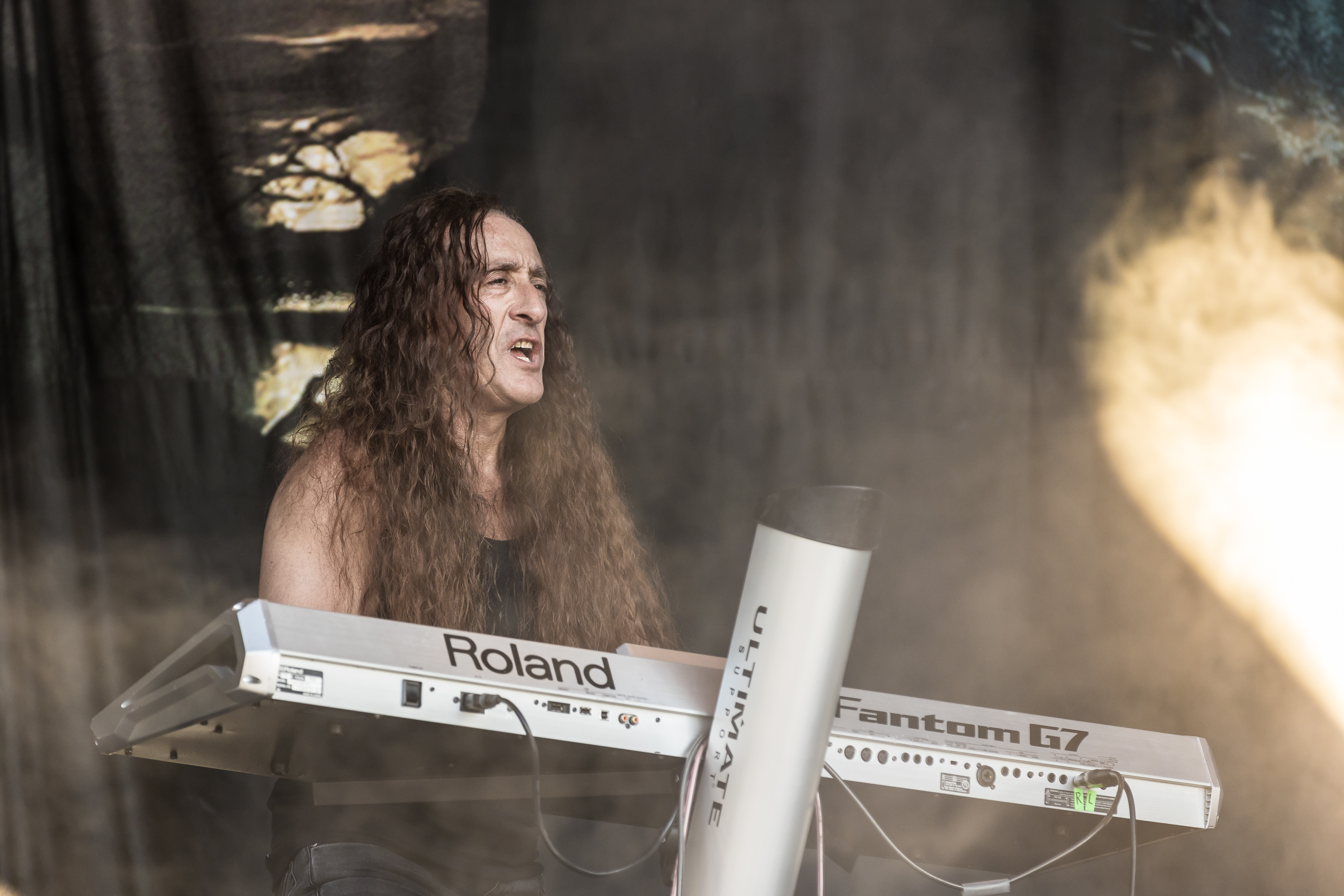
(L–R): Luca Turilli and Alex Staropoli, the two founding members of Rhapsody of Fire

The band was formed in 1993 by Luca Turilli, Alex Staropoli, and Daniele Carbonera under the name Thundercross. Guitarist Roberto De Micheli, a classmate of Turilli, soon joined the band, but chose to leave shortly afterwards.

In 1994, Thundercross released their first demo, Land of Immortals, with vocalist Cristiano Adacher. During this period of time, they went through a few bassist changes in their lineup.

After accepting a proposal from Limb Music Products & Publishing, the band started recording their second demo, Eternal Glory. At this time they also changed their name to Rhapsody. Shortly after the release of Eternal Glory, Adacher and bassist Furlan left the band. Former vocalist of Labyrinth and Athena Fabio Lione joined Rhapsody afterwards.

=== 1997–2004: The Emerald Sword Saga ===
With these four members, the band started recording their debut studio album, Legendary Tales, in Germany alongside producer Sascha Paeth. The album was released in 1997. The album is the first chapter of a saga titled The Emerald Sword Saga. The lyrics on the album (written by Turilli) often refer to mystical medieval folklore and the heroic valor of those times and are centered around high fantasy, highlighting, in particular, the everlasting fight between good and evil.

In 1998, after recruiting bassist Alessandro Lotta, the band released Symphony of Enchanted Lands, which further developed their characteristic style of music. The album features "Emerald Sword", which draws on Russian folklore and Celtic style elements, and further develops on the Emerald Sword Saga.

In 2000, Rhapsody started their first tour, starting in Sweden. They performed with Stratovarius and Sonata Arctica supported by their new drummer Alex Holzwarth.

After the tour, they began recording their new album, Dawn of Victory. The first single "Holy Thunderforce" was released in 2000 with some success. The new album showed Rhapsody in a whole new light, with a more aggressive style and sped-up tempo. It continued the third part of the Emerald Sword Saga, and the orchestra still played an important part of the album, with songs such as "Lux Triumphans", "The Village of Dwarves" and "The Bloody Rage of the Titans", played beside more bombastic melodies as "Dawn of Victory", "Triumph for My Magic Steel", "Dargor, Shadowlord of the Black Mountain" and "Holy Thunderforce". It was more successful than any of their previous outings, and "Dawn of Victory" ranked at #32 in the German charts, while in Japan it peaked in 4th place. In early summer 2001, Rhapsody toured through South America and Europe.

Rain of a Thousand Flames served as a bridge between the last part of the Emerald Sword Saga and Power of the Dragonflame. Power of the Dragonflame was released in February 2002 and saw incredible success worldwide. Marking the end of the Emerald Sword Saga, it contained soft ballads, upbeat metal melodies, and the epic 19-minute-long concluding song, "Gargoyles, Angels of Darkness". The band was joined by bassist Patrice Guers and touring guitarist Dominique Leurquin. Alex Holzwarth, who had been playing drums for Rhapsody onstage since 2000 was listed in the official band line-up on these releases, although Holzwarth has played drums in the studio since The Dark Secret EP.

=== 2004–2008: Beginning of The Dark Secret Saga, name change and legal issues ===
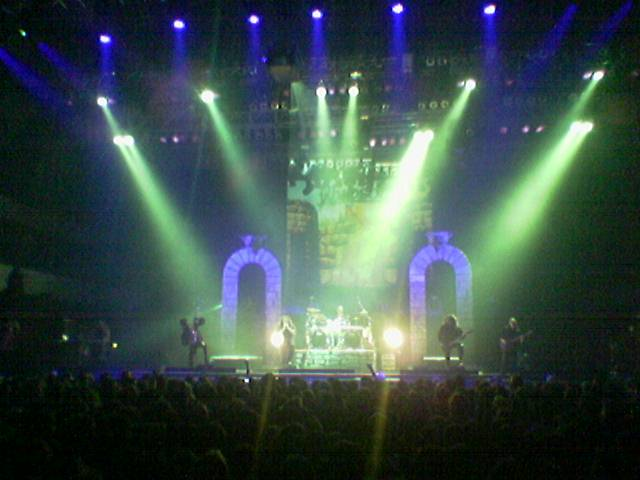
Rhapsody of Fire performing in 2007

The Dark Secret EP was released on 28 June 2004. It gave listeners a taste of what could be expected from the new album, labeled Symphony of Enchanted Lands II: The Dark Secret which was released several months later in September. Christopher Lee was involved in this project, narrating part of the storyline. Symphony of Enchanted Lands II was a follow-up to the Emerald Sword Saga called The Dark Secret Saga.

In July 2006 the band formerly known as Rhapsody changed their name to Rhapsody of Fire due to trademark issues. The band's website goes into further detail:

The band members consider this a great new start, reflecting the emboldened and increasingly grandiose direction that their music has taken. "The power of the Dragonflame will burn brighter than ever before," says guitarist/songwriter Luca Turilli. Keyboardist/songwriter Alex Staropoli adds, "The name Rhapsody of Fire better represents the energy that has always been present in this band and its music."

The band released Triumph or Agony, the second album in the Dark Secret saga, on 25 September 2006 in Europe. Triumph or Agony featured a live 70-piece orchestra and choir as Turilli and Staropoli continued to self-produce the band's work, assisted by Sascha Paeth.

Newer songs include "Silent Dream", "Son of Pain" and the epic 16-minute-long "The Mystic Prophecy of the Demonknight", an example of a cinema soundtrack adapted to a metal song. The album included Fabio Lione's first songwriting contribution for the band, "Il canto del Vento".

In June 2008, Luca Turilli reported on the band's official website about a "hard legal fight with Magic Circle Music and his main representative Mr. Joey DeMaio". Due to this, the band went on hiatus for a year and a half. During this period, Luca Turilli concentrated on his solo albums, Fabio Lione collaborated with Vision Divine and Kamelot, Alex Holzwarth collaborated with his brother Oliver, and Staropoli also announced his plans to record a solo album.

=== 2009–2011: End of The Dark Secret Saga, Turilli's departure and split into two bands ===
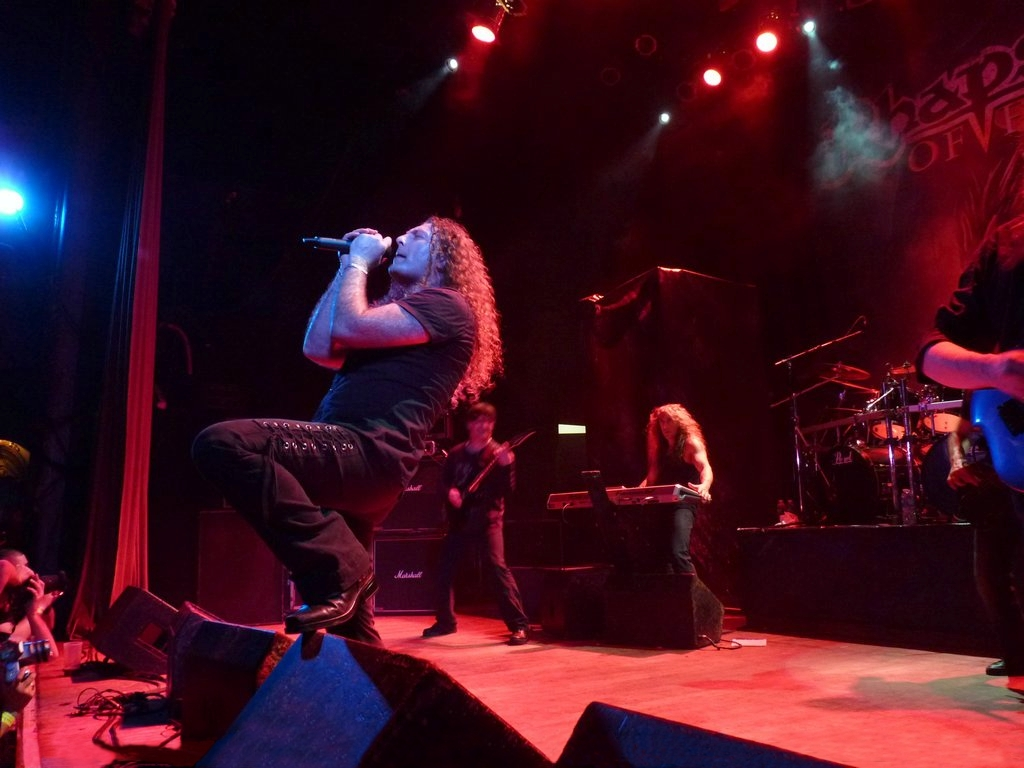
Rhapsody of Fire performing in Buenos Aires in 2010

In late 2009 Limb Music re-released their back-catalogue from 1997 to 2001, along with the compilation album Tales from the Emerald Sword Saga on digital music stores.

On 18 November 2009, it was announced that the band had signed with Nuclear Blast Records and that their new album, The Frozen Tears of Angels, would be released on 5 March 2010. However, Nuclear Blast stated that the album would not be released until 30 April. On 5 March 2010, the official Rhapsody of Fire website announced that it would indeed be released on 30 April. A new song was made available to download soon after. The album was produced by Luca Turilli and Alex Staropoli and mixed and mastered by Sascha Paeth at the Gate Studio in Wolfsburg. As well as the standard edition, it was released as a "special limited deluxe digipak" which included two bonus tracks and a 32-page booklet, and on vinyl.

A 35-minute EP entitled The Cold Embrace of Fear – A Dark Romantic Symphony was released in Europe on 15 October 2010 and in the United States on 25 January 2011. The story is directly connected to The Frozen Tears of Angels.

Rhapsody of Fire's ninth studio album, From Chaos to Eternity, was released on 12 July 2011. From Chaos to Eternity is the final album in the band's fantasy storyline, The Algalord Chronicles, which began with the release of Legendary Tales. It also marks the conclusion of The Dark Secret Saga, which began on Symphony of Enchanted Lands II: The Dark Secret. The final song on the album, the five-part "Heroes of the Waterfalls' Kingdom", is the band's longest, at almost twenty minutes long.

After the release of From Chaos to Eternity, the band underwent many line-up changes. On 15 April 2011, it was announced that Tom Hess had become Rhapsody of Fire's second guitarist. Hess had actually joined the band in December 2010, recording all the rhythm guitar parts and contributing several solos for From Chaos to Eternity. Hess began touring with the band starting in 2011.

On 16 August 2011, Rhapsody of Fire announced the departure of long-time guitarist, songwriter, and founding member Luca Turilli, along with bassist Patrice Guers. They went on to found a new Rhapsody band, Luca Turilli's Rhapsody. With the departure of Turilli, Tom Hess became the lead guitarist of the band. Oliver Holzwarth, brother of drummer Alex Holzwarth, was announced to be Guers' replacement on 1 September 2011. Soon after, on 27 September 2011, the band announced that Roberto De Micheli had joined them as a second guitar player.

=== 2012–2017: Continued line-up changes, Lione's departure and parallel farewell tour ===
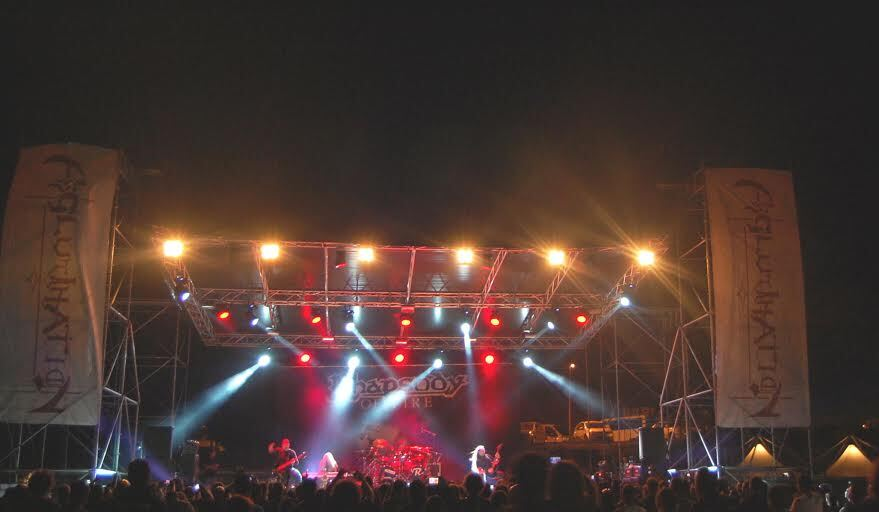
Rhapsody of Fire at the Agglutination Metal Festival 2012

The band embarked on their "From Chaos to Eternity World Tour" in the spring of 2012. This tour was their largest yet, spanning three continents. Later that year, on 11 December 2012, the band signed with AFM Records. On 3 May 2013, a second live album was released, titled Live – From Chaos to Eternity, recorded during the European dates of their From Chaos to Eternity World Tour.

In July 2013, Tom Hess respectfully parted ways with the band due to "philosophical differences" with Alex Staropoli. Hess would not be replaced, with the band continuing with just one guitarist. Recording for the band's next studio album, Dark Wings of Steel, also began in July 2013. Dark Wings of Steel was released at the end of the year and was the band's first album not to be based on the band's fantasy saga, The Algalord Chronicles, which spanned from Legendary Tales to From Chaos to Eternity. A European tour followed the release of the album.

Bassist Oliver Holzwarth left the band in August 2014. Alessandro Sala was announced as his replacement in June 2015, although he had joined the band a few months prior. Sala had previously been a bandmate of Roberto De Micheli in the band Sinestesia.

Songwriting for a followup to Dark Wings of Steel began in the fall of 2014. Album artwork and the track listings for the new album, titled Into the Legend, were revealed in November 2015. The album was released in January 2016.

After a short tour to promote the new album, Fabio Lione announced his departure on 28 September 2016. Drummer Alex Holzwarth also announced his departure on the band's Facebook page a couple of days later on 9 October 2016.

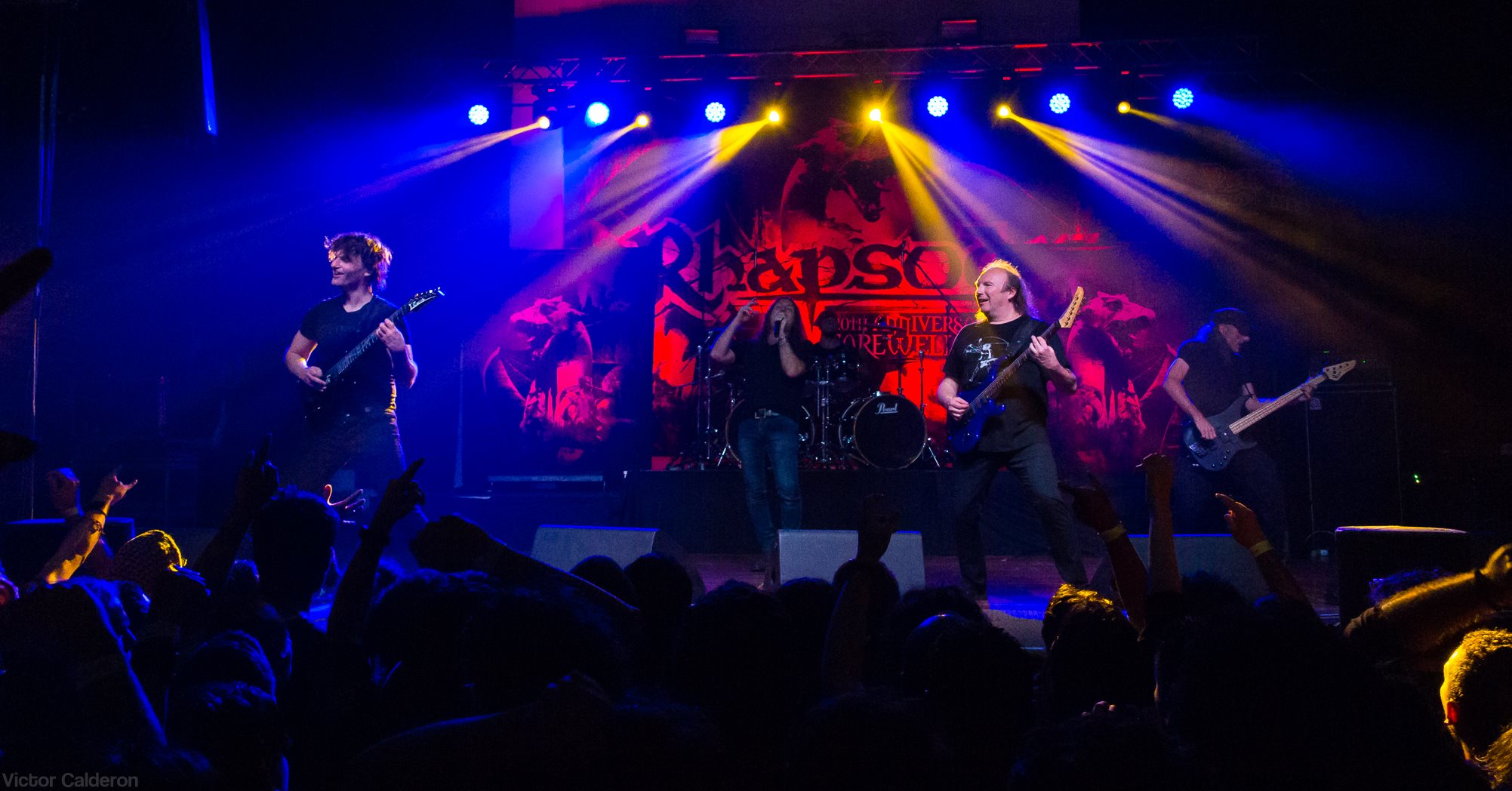
Former members performing in Costa Rica for the parallel Rhapsody farewell tour

On 21 November 2016, former members Luca Turilli, Fabio Lione, Alex Holzwarth, Patrice Guers and Dominique Leurquin announced a Rhapsody "20th Anniversary Farewell Tour", in parallel to the current band. The tour celebrated the 20th anniversary of Rhapsody's first album Legendary Tales and featured, among other songs, the album Symphony of Enchanted Lands played in its entirety. The 20th Anniversary Farewell Tour started on 26 April 2017 in Annecy, France, and ended on 20 March 2018 in Madrid, Spain.

On 11 November 2016, the band announced their new lead vocalist, Giacomo Voli. Manu Lotter was announced as the new drummer on 22 December 2016.

On 20 January 2017, the band announced that their new album will be 14 classic Rhapsody songs re-recorded. The new album titled Legendary Years was announced on 17 March 2017 from the band's Facebook page. The album was released on 26 May 2017.

The new lineup performed for the first time at the Trieste Summer Rock Festival at the castle of San Giusto on 29 July 2017 in Trieste, Italy. Following after the new line-up's debut performance was a tour with Orden Ogan in the fall of 2017.

=== 2018–present: The Nephilim's Empire Saga ===
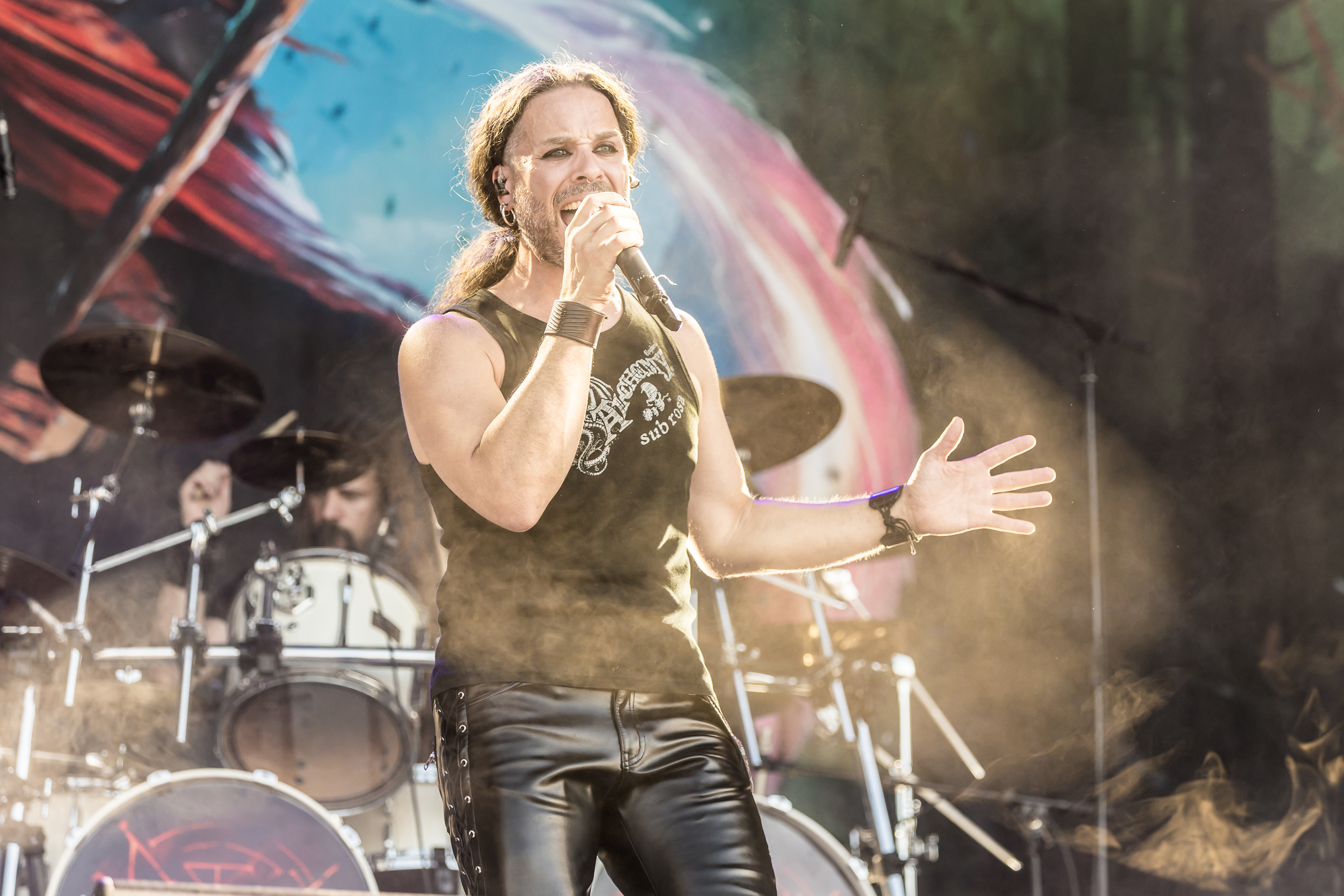
Giacomo Voli, the second lead vocalist, joined the band in 2016 following Fabio Lione's departure.

On 14 March 2018, the band had posted a narrative extract on their Facebook page, hinting that another album was being made. The band later revealed the title of their twelfth album The Eighth Mountain, as the first chapter of a new saga titled The Nephilim's Empire Saga on 16 November 2018. The album was released on 22 February 2019.

On 6 April 2020, Giacomo Voli revealed in an exclusive interview that the band was working on their next album. Giacomo said, "This year we will record the new album and probably start already in the summer. At the end of the tour, I will start working on the lyrics with Roby De Micheli because some songs are already in the pre-production phase so they can be released in the spring of next year. As for the development of the saga, we will continue to narrate the events of this strange protagonist who was able to get out of hell thanks to the Nephilim. There are many possible ways and we will see what will happen."

On 22 June 2020, it was announced that drummer Manu Lotter had departed from the band. The band announced Paolo Marchesich as their new drummer on 14 July 2020. Alongside Sala and De Micheli, Paolo Marchesich was also a member of Sinestesia.

Rhapsody of Fire had announced that the recording of the album had been completed on 24 September 2020, and were confirmed to be mixing the album with Sebastian "Seeb" Levermann in April 2021.

Rhapsody of Fire released their EP, I'll Be Your Hero, on 4 June 2021 which contained a song recorded for the band's thirteenth studio album, Glory for Salvation, the second chapter to The Nephilim's Empire Saga which was released on 26 November 2021. A second single named after the title of the album was released on 9 July 2021. The third single off of the album, "Magic Signs", was released on 2 September 2021. The fourth single, "Terial the Hawk", was released on 15 October 2021. The fifth single, "Chains of Destiny", was released on 7 November 2021, along with a music video.

On May 12, 2023, Rhapsody of Fire had released the single, "Kreel's Magic Staff". The band later announced the second single, "Challenge the Wind", the title track for the studio album which was released on 29 February 2024. The fourteenth studio album, Challenge the Wind, the third chapter to The Nephilim's Empire Saga was released on 31 May 2024. Three other singles were released to promote the album: "A Brave New Hope", "Diamond Claws", and "Mastered by the Dark". The band are set to perform in North America as an opening act for DragonForce alongside support act Ensiferum in November and December 2026.

== Band members ==
Current

- Alex Staropoli – keyboards (1993–present)
- Roberto De Micheli – guitar (1993, 2011–present)
- Alessandro Sala – bass (2015–present)
- Giacomo Voli – vocals (2016–present)
- Paolo Marchesich – drums (2020–present)

Former

- Cristiano Adacher – vocals (1993–1995)
- Andrea Furlan – bass (1993–1995)
- Daniele Carbonera – drums (1993–1999)
- Alessandro Lotta – bass (1998–2002)
- Patrice Guers – bass (2002–2011)
- Luca Turilli – guitar (1993–2011), vocals (1993)
- Tom Hess – guitar (2011–2013)
- Oliver Holzwarth – bass (2011–2014)
- Fabio Lione – vocals (1995–2016)
- Alex Holzwarth – drums (2000–2016)
- Manu Lotter – drums (2016–2020)

Session / Live

- Manuel Staropoli – studio baroque recorders (1997–present), composition (2013–present)
- Robert Hunecke-Rizzo – studio bass (1997)
- Sascha Paeth – studio bass (1997, 2002, 2014–2015)
- Jay Lansford – studio narration (1997–2002)
- Thunderforce – studio drums (2000–2002)
- Dominique Leurquin – live and studio guitars (2000–2011)
- Petr Pololanik – studio conductor and orchestrator (2004, 2006)
- Christopher Lee – studio narration, spoken vocals, occasional singing vocals (2004–2011; died 2015)
- Vito Lo Re – orchestra conductor (2013, 2016, 2019)
- Leone Conti – live bass (2020)
- Danilo Arisi – live bass (2024)

Timeline

== Discography ==
Studio albums

- Legendary Tales (1997)
- Symphony of Enchanted Lands (1998)
- Dawn of Victory (2000)
- Rain of a Thousand Flames (2001)
- Power of the Dragonflame (2002)
- Symphony of Enchanted Lands II – The Dark Secret (2004)
- Triumph or Agony (2006)
- The Frozen Tears of Angels (2010)
- From Chaos to Eternity (2011)
- Dark Wings of Steel (2013)
- Into the Legend (2016)
- The Eighth Mountain (2019)
- Glory for Salvation (2021)
- Challenge the Wind (2024)
