= Patrice Guers =

Patrice Guers (born 5 September 1969 in Annecy, Haute-Savoie, France) is the former bassist of the Italian symphonic power metal band Rhapsody of Fire. He joined the band after Alessandro Lotta left the band and performed with them until 2011, when he departed with guitarist Luca Turilli to found Luca Turilli's Rhapsody. He has also worked with Patrick Rondat, contributing in several albums and live appearances. He started playing bass at the age of fourteen. He has a progressive style of playing bass. Patrice is endorsed by the Vigier Basses company, French manufacturer.
