= Luca Turilli =

Italian musician

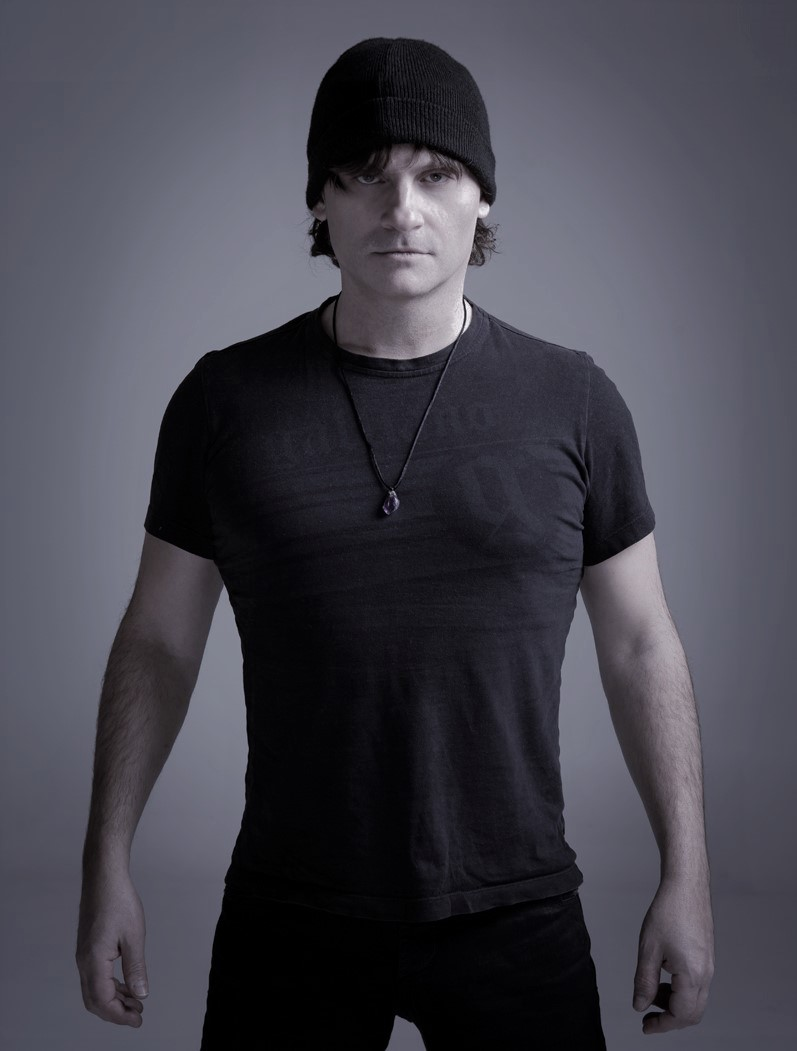
- Turilli in 2019

Background information
- Born: 5 March 1972 (age 54); Trieste, Italy
- Occupations: Musician; composer; arranger; record producer
- Instruments: Guitar; keyboards; piano
- Years active: 1993–present
- Formerly of: Rhapsody of Fire; Turilli / Lione Rhapsody; Luca Turilli's Rhapsody; Luca Turilli's Dreamquest

Luca Turilli (born 5 March 1972) is an Italian composer, arranger, producer and multi-instrumentalist. He is the original guitarist and a founder of the symphonic power metal band Rhapsody, later called Rhapsody of Fire, for which he composed and arranged all music with his colleague Alex Staropoli from 1997 until 2011.

In the early 2000s, Turilli released a trilogy of solo studio albums and one studio album under the name of Luca Turilli's Dreamquest. After his split from Rhapsody of Fire, he released three studio albums under the name Luca Turilli's Rhapsody. In 2019 Turilli released a studio album with other former Rhapsody of Fire members under the name Turilli / Lione Rhapsody.

In 2020, he announced the release of his debut piano album.

== Early life ==
Turilli was born in Trieste, Venezia Giulia, Italy. His father was a cello player who died when Turilli was only two years old. He inherited his passion for classical music, and at 16 years old, he started playing guitar. In 1993, Turilli survived cancer at age 21. At the age of 22, he started playing piano.

== Career ==
In 1993, Turilli founded the band Thundercross, which was renamed Rhapsody after releasing the first demo, and renamed once again to Rhapsody of Fire for trademark reasons in 2006.

In 2008, Turilli began an online guitar course titled Luca Turilli's Neoclassical Revelation.

In August 2011, Turilli split from Rhapsody of Fire, choosing to move forward with a new group, Luca Turilli's Rhapsody. This band released their debut album entitled Ascending to Infinity in 2012. Their second album Prometheus, Symphonia Ignis Divinus followed in 2015, One year later the same album was released under the title Prometheus, The Dolby Atmos Experience + Cinematic and Live. The album, mixed by producer/mixing engineer Chris Heil was the first one in music history to be mixed in Dolby Atmos

From November 2016 to March 2018, Turilli and his former bandmates Fabio Lione and Alex Holzwarth who in the meantime had also left Rhapsody of Fire, toured as Rhapsody Reunion on a tour entitled "20th Anniversary Farewell Tour".

After the tour's ending this same lineup formed a new band entitled Turilli / Lione Rhapsody. This band released their only album Zero Gravity (Rebirth and Evolution) in 2019. Turilli / Lione Rhapsody later disbanded in February 2023 following a final tour in Latin America, announcing that they would be "closing the chapter of their career for good".

== Playing style ==
Early in his career, Turilli was influenced by guitarists such as Yngwie Malmsteen, Tony MacAlpine, Marty Friedman and especially Jason Becker who is considered by him today as the greatest guitarist ever. His lead playing often includes extensive use of sweep picked arpeggios, tremolo picking, classically influenced phrases, and scales such as aeolian, harmonic minor, phrygian, locrian, and melodic minor. In his latest albums, he introduced new ethnic elements such as Hirajoshi and Pentatonic scales. As a pianist, his main influences are Romantic pianists like Chopin and contemporary composers such as Ludovico Einaudi, Yann Tiersen, Yiruma and Philip Glass.

== Discography ==
Studio albums:

- King of the Nordic Twilight (1999)
- Prophet of the Last Eclipse (2002)
- The Infinite Wonders of Creation (2006)

=== Rhapsody of Fire ===
Studio albums:

- Legendary Tales (1997)
- Symphony of Enchanted Lands (1998)
- Dawn of Victory (2000)
- Rain of a Thousand Flames (2001)
- Power of the Dragonflame (2002)
- Symphony of Enchanted Lands II – The Dark Secret (2004)
- Triumph or Agony (2006)
- The Frozen Tears of Angels (2010)
- From Chaos to Eternity (2011)

EPs and live albums:

- The Dark Secret (2004)
- Live in Canada 2005: The Dark Secret (2006)
- The Cold Embrace of Fear – A Dark Romantic Symphony (2010)

=== Luca Turilli's Dreamquest ===
Studio albums:

- Lost Horizons (2006)

=== Luca Turilli's Rhapsody ===
Studio albums:

- Ascending to Infinity (2012)
- Prometheus, Symphonia Ignis Divinus (2015)

Live albums:

- Prometheus, The Dolby Atmos Experience + Cinematic and Live (2016)

=== Turilli / Lione Rhapsody ===
Studio albums:

- Zero Gravity (Rebirth and Evolution) (2019)
