= Alex Staropoli =

Italian musician (born 1970)

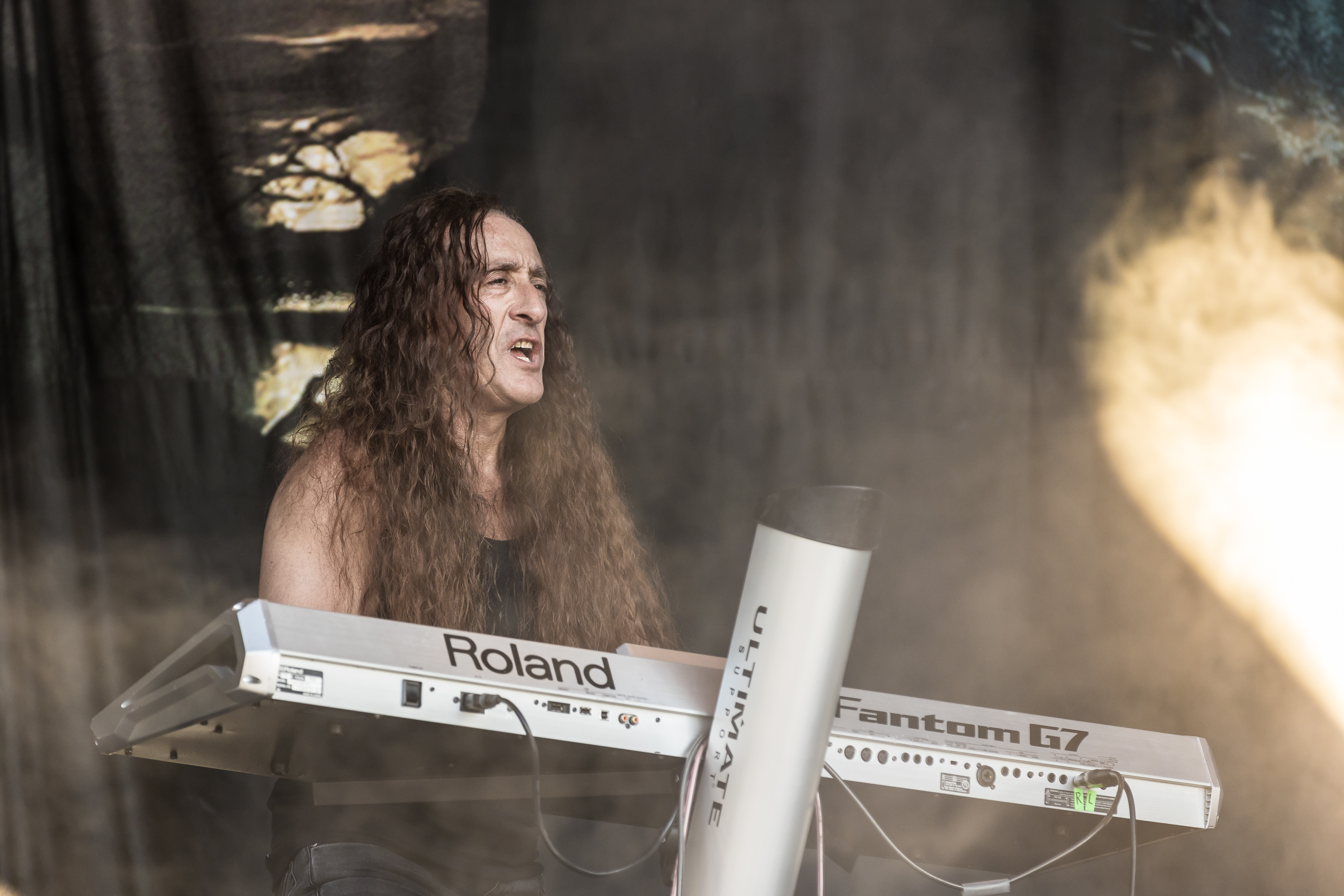
- Alex Staropoli performing at Rockharz in 2025.

Background information
- Born: Alessandro Staropoli; 9 January 1970 (age 56); Trieste, Italy
- Origin: Italy
- Genres: Power metal; symphonic metal; neoclassical metal
- Occupations: Musician; composer
- Instruments: Keyboard; guitar
- Years active: 1993–present
- Labels: Limb; Magic Circle; SPV; AFM
- Website: www.alexstaropoli.com

Alessandro "Alex" Staropoli (born 9 January 1970) is a keyboard player, composer, leader and co-founder of the Italian symphonic power metal band Rhapsody of Fire. He does the orchestral arrangements in all the band's songs. Following the split with Luca Turilli, Staropoli is Rhapsody of Fire's last remaining founding member.

== Biography ==
Staropoli was born in Trieste. As a child he was mainly interested in nature – mountains, forests and lakes. At the age of nine he got his first piano and began to study its basics, and at the age of fourteen he bought his first electric guitar. After meeting Luca, but before the creation of Rhapsody of Fire, he bought a Korg 01/W pro keyboard, a model he still uses.

Alex and Luca met in 1990 during a course in mental techniques (how to have more control of your own mind), and together they started the band Rhapsody (later named as Rhapsody of Fire) in 1993.
