= Kamelot discography =

This is the discography for American power metal band Kamelot.

== Albums ==
=== Studio albums ===
Title	Album details	Peak chart positions												Sales
Title	Album details	US	US Hard Rock	GER	SWE	NOR	FIN	AUT	SWI	FRA	NLD	JPN	UK	Sales
Eternity	Released: July 23, 1995; Label: Noise; Formats: CD, digital download	—	—	—	—	—	—	—	—	—	—	—	—	
Dominion	Released: April 15, 1997; Label: Noise; Formats: CD, digital download	—	—	—	—	—	—	—	—	—	—	—	—	
Siége Perilous	Released: August 4, 1998; Label: Noise; Formats: CD, digital download	—	—	—	—	—	—	—	—	—	—	—	—	
The Fourth Legacy	Released: September 19, 1999; Label: Noise; Formats: CD, digital download	—	—	—	—	—	—	—	—	—	—	—	—	
Karma	Released: July 9, 2001; Label: Sanctuary; Formats: CD, digital download	—	—	85	—	—	—	—	—	—	—	93	—	
Epica	Released: January 13, 2003; Label: Noise; Formats: CD, digital download	—	—	59	—	—	28	—	—	117	—	47	—	
The Black Halo	Released: March 15, 2005; Label: Steamhammer/SPV; Formats: CD, LP, digital download	—	—	81	24	—	50	—	—	101	—	41	—	
Ghost Opera	Released: June 4, 2007; Label: Steamhammer/SPV; Formats: CD, LP, digital download	—	—	61	29	25	35	—	88	83	51	34	—	
Poetry for the Poisoned	Released: September 29, 2010; Label: Edel AG/KMG; Formats: CD, LP, digital download	74	6	32	23	7	21	57	48	54	43	55	143	US: 6,100+
Silverthorn	Released: October 24, 2012; Label: Steamhammer/SPV; Formats: CD, LP, digital download	79	9	36	20	17	28	70	55	121	54	65	168	US: 5,400+
Haven	Released: May 5, 2015; Label: Napalm; Formats: CD, LP, digital download	75	1	14	44	43	12	41	24	150	23	28	119	US: 7,600+
The Shadow Theory	Released: April 6, 2018; Label: Napalm; Formats: CD, LP, digital download	141	2	13	55	—	24	30	13	122	60	44	—	
The Awakening	Released: March 17, 2023; Label: Napalm; Formats: CD, LP, digital download	—	—	9	—	—	—	31	15	—	94	54	—	
Dark Asylum	Released: August 28, 2026; Label: Napalm; Formats: CD, LP, digital download	—	—	19	—	—	—	24	11	—	—	44	—	
"—" denotes a recording that did not chart or was not released in that territory.

=== Compilation albums ===
Title	Album details
Where I Reign - The Very Best of the Noise Years 1995-2003	Released: May 13, 2016; Label: BMG/Sanctuary; Formats: 2 CD

=== Live albums ===
Title	Album details	Peak chart positions
Title	Album details	JPN
The Expedition	Released: October 10, 2000; Label: Noise Records; Formats: CD	—
One Cold Winter's Night	Released: November 14, 2006; Label: SPV/Steamhammer; Formats: CD	197
I Am the Empire – Live from the 013	Released: August 14, 2020; Label: Napalm; Formats: CD, LP, digital download	—
"—" denotes a recording that did not chart or was not released in that territory.

=== Video albums ===
Title	Album details	Peak chart positions	
Title	Album details	SWE	JPN
One Cold Winter's Night	Released: October 30, 2006; Label: Steamhammer; Formats: DVD	8	280
I Am the Empire – Live from the 013	Released: August 14, 2020; Label: Napalm; Formats: Blu-ray, DVD	—	—

== Singles ==
Titles	Year	Album
"The Haunting (Somewhere in Time)"	2005	The Black Halo
"March of Mephisto"	2005	The Black Halo
"Soul Society"	2006	The Black Halo
"The Human Stain"	2007	Ghost Opera
"Ghost Opera"	2007	Ghost Opera
"Rule the World"	2008	Ghost Opera
"Love You to Death"	2009	Ghost Opera
"The Great Pandemonium"	2010	Poetry for the Poisoned
"Hunter's Season"	2011	Poetry for the Poisoned
"Necropolis"	2011	Poetry for the Poisoned
"Sacrimony (Angel of Afterlife)"	2012	Silverthorn
"Falling Like the Fahrenheit"	2013	Silverthorn
"My Confession"	2013	Silverthorn
"Veil of Elysium"	2015	Haven
"Insomnia"	2015	Haven
"Liar Liar (Wasteland Monarch)"	2015	Haven
"My Therapy"	2016	Haven
"Under Grey Skies"	2017	Haven
"RavenLight"	2018	The Shadow Theory
"Phantom Divine (Shadow Empire)"	2018	The Shadow Theory
"Amnesiac"	2018	The Shadow Theory
"MindFall Remedy"	2019	The Shadow Theory
"Vespertine (My Crimson Bride)"	2019	The Shadow Theory
"One More Flag in the Ground"	2023	The Awakening
"Opus of the Night (Ghost Requiem)"	2023	The Awakening
"Eventide"	2023	The Awakening
"New Babylon"	2023	The Awakening
"NightSky"	2024	The Awakening
"Ashen World"	2026	Dark Asylum
"Godlike Alchemy"	2026	Dark Asylum
"Sanctuary"	2026	Dark Asylum

== Music videos ==
Year	Title	Director(s)	Album
2005	"The Haunting"	Patric Ullaeus	The Black Halo
2005	"March of Mephisto"	Patric Ullaeus	The Black Halo
2005	"Serenade"	Casey Grillo	The Black Halo
2007	"Ghost Opera"	IvanCode-iCodeTeam	Ghost Opera
2007	"The Human Stain"	IvanCode-iCodeTeam	Ghost Opera
2008	"Rule the World"	IvanCode-iCodeTeam	Ghost Opera
2009	"Pendulous Fall"	Casey Grillo	Ghost Opera
2009	"Love You To Death"	IvanCode-iCodeTeam	Ghost Opera
2010	"The Great Pandemonium"	Owe Lingwall	Poetry for the Poisoned
2010	"Hunter's Season"	Unknown	Poetry for the Poisoned
2011	"Necropolis"	Owe Lingvall	Poetry for the Poisoned
2012	"Sacrimony (Angel of Afterlife)"	IvanCode-iCodeTeam	Silverthorn
2013	"My Confession"	IvanCode-iCodeTeam	Silverthorn
2014	"Falling Like the Fahrenheit"	Ville Lipiäinen	Silverthorn
2015	"Insomnia"	IvanCode-iCodeTeam	Haven
2015	"Liar Liar (Wasteland Monarchy)"	IvanCode-iCodeTeam	Haven
2016	"My Therapy"	IvanCode-iCodeTeam	Haven
2018	"Phantom Divine (Shadow Empire)"	IvanCode-iCodeTeam	The Shadow Theory
2018	"Amnesiac"	IvanCode-iCodeTeam	The Shadow Theory
2018	"MindFall Remedy"	Thomas Crane	The Shadow Theory
2023	"One More Flag in the Ground"	Unknown	The Awakening
2023	"New Babylon"	Unknown	The Awakening
2023	"Eventide"	Unknown	The Awakening
2026	"Ashen World"	Unknown	Dark Asylum
2026	"Sanctuary"	Unknown	Dark Asylum
