= Silverthorn (album) =

2012 studio album by Kamelot

- Cover art by Stefan Heilemann

Studio album by Kamelot
- Released: October 24, 2012
- Recorded: January–June 2012
- Studios: Morrisound Recording, Tampa, Florida, US, Gate Studios, Wolfsburg, Germany, Palosphere Studios, Stuttgart, Germany, and JohanArt, Sweden
- Genres: Symphonic metal; power metal; progressive metal
- Length: 56:20
- Labels: SPV/Steamhammer (Europe and North America); King (Japan)
- Producers: Sascha Paeth, Miro and Kamelot

Kamelot chronology
Poetry for the Poisoned (2010)	Silverthorn (2012)	Haven (2015)

Alternate cover
- Silverthorn vinyl and 2-CD box set cover (2012)

Promo cover
- Silverthorn promo cover (2012)

Singles from Silverthorn
- 1. "Sacrimony (Angel of Afterlife)" Released: 5 September 2012; 2. "Falling Like the Fahrenheit" Released: 25 February 2013; 3. "My Confession" Released: 10 July 2013

Silverthorn is the tenth studio album by American power metal band Kamelot. The album was released on the Steamhammer label, a division of SPV, in October 2012 worldwide. It is the first album to feature Tommy Karevik as the lead singer and their third concept album, after Epica (2003) and The Black Halo (2005). The concept and story are original, and features a 19th-century little girl named Jolee, who dies in a tragic accident witnessed by her twin brothers. The story deals with how the girl's affluent family handles the tragic event, leading to cover-ups, secrets, and betrayal. The cover by Stefan Heilemann shows Jolee, the main character and angel of afterlife, as an adult.

== Release ==
Silverthorn was released in a staggered international rollout. The album was issued in Japan on October 24, 2012, followed by Germany on October 26, 2012, the rest of Europe on October 29, 2012, and North America on November 1, 2012.

== Music video ==
A music video was released for the promotional single "Sacrimony (Angel of Afterlife)". The video focuses on the story, mainly on the death of the main character, Jolee. The first part of the video takes place in 1863, with Jolee's two brothers flying a kite on the roof of their house, Jolee joins them and shortly after, a strong wind causes one of the brothers to step back, accidentally pushing Jolee off of the roof and into the river next to the house. The father then confronts the mother about the incident and roughly shoves her backward before roughly beating one of the boys while the other sits, crying and frustrated about the incident. Twenty-five years later in 1888, the two brothers, one still being frustrated, are sitting with each other while their father comes in with the intention of harming them. One stands up to his father and throws him on the ground. The father suffers a heart attack and dies. At the end of the video, one of the brothers hallucinates seeing Jolee while imprisoned and hugs her, only to reveal he is hugging nothing but empty air. Elize Ryd & Alissa White-Gluz were both featured in the video.

Another video for the single "My Confession" was posted on 10 July 2013 featuring the string quartet group, Eklipse. On August 27, the band released "Falling Like The Fahrenheit" as the last video for the album, featuring moments with fans and on stage.

== Critical reception ==
Professional ratings
Review scores
Source	Rating
Blabbermouth	8.5/10 stars
Metal Storm	8/10 stars
Metal Underground	4.5/5 stars
PopMatters	8/10 stars
El Lado Oscuro de la Luna	7.5/10 stars
Goetia Media	4.5/5 stars
Sea of Tranquility	4.5/5 stars

The album received mainly positive views, with critics applauding Tommy Karevik's performance as the new lead singer.

Metal Underground praised the album with a four and a half stars out of five stating "'Silverthorn' may appear to be a return of sorts to the uptempo styles of pre-“Poetry." " Blabbermouth also gave the album a positive review saying "For now, Kamelot continues to storm through their glory ride on the surge of a still-hefty fan base no doubt breathing easy that the unexpected departure of Roy Khan didn't lay this unit on the wayside. Instead, the equally animated Tommy Karevik (Seventh Wonder) steps into Khan's place, wielding his own arsenal of gusty altos and elevating passaggios to keep Kamelot humming on their tenth studio album, Silverthorn."

== Track listing ==
All tracks are written by Thomas Youngblood, Sascha Paeth, Oliver Palotai and Tommy Karevik, except "Falling Like the Fahrenheit" and "Leaving Too Soon" by Youngblood, Paeth, Palotai, Karevik and Bob Katsionis.

No.	Title	Length
1.	"Manus Dei"	2:12
2.	"Sacrimony (Angel of Afterlife)" (feat. Elize Ryd & Alissa White-Gluz)	4:39
3.	"Ashes to Ashes"	3:58
4.	"Torn"	3:51
5.	"Song for Jolee"	4:33
6.	"Veritas" (feat. Elize Ryd)	4:35
7.	"My Confession"	4:34
8.	"Silverthorn"	4:52
9.	"Falling Like the Fahrenheit" (feat. Elize Ryd)	5:05
10.	"Solitaire"	4:56
11.	"Prodigal Son": "Part I: Funerale"; "Part II: Burden of Shame (The Branding)"; "Part III: The Journey" (feat. Alissa White-Gluz)	8:52
12.	"Continuum" (silence at 1:53, cello solo at 2:49)	4:17

Japanese edition bonus track
No.	Title	Length
13.	"Leaving Too Soon"	3:51

Box set limited edition - disc 2 (instrumental version)
No.	Title	Length
1.	"Manus Dei (Instrumental Version)"	2:12
2.	"Sacrimony (Angel of Afterlife) [Instrumental Version]"	4:39
3.	"Kismet (Instrumental Version)"	1:41
4.	"Ashes to Ashes (Instrumental Version)"	3:58
5.	"Torn (Instrumental Version)"	3:51
6.	"Song for Jolee (Instrumental Version)"	4:33
7.	"Veritas (Instrumental Version)"	4:34
8.	"My Confession (Instrumental Version)"	4:33
9.	"Silverthorn (Instrumental Version)"	4:51
10.	"Falling Like the Fahrenheit (Instrumental Version)"	5:06
11.	"Solitaire (Instrumental Version)"	4:56
12.	"Prodigal Son (Instrumental Version)"	8:52
13.	"Continuum (Instrumental Version)"	1:53
14.	"Grace" (with Apollo Papathanasio & Niclas Engelin)	3:24

== Personnel ==
Credits for Silverthorn adapted from liner notes.

Kamelot

- Tommy Karevik – vocals
- Thomas Youngblood – guitars
- Sean Tibbetts – bass
- Oliver Palotai – keyboards, orchestrations
- Casey Grillo – drums, percussion

Additional personnel

- Elize Ryd – clean female vocals on "Sacrimony (Angel of Afterlife)", "Veritas", and "Falling Like the Fahrenheit", choir vocals
- Alissa White-Gluz – guttural vocals on "Sacrimony (Angel of Afterlife)" and clean female vocals on "Prodigal Son Part III: The Journey"
- Cinzia Rizzo – vocals on "Continuum"
- Sascha Paeth – additional guitars, growls
- Annelise Youngblood – nursery rhymes, child choir vocals
- István Tamás – accordion on "Veritas"
- Eklipse – strings on "Sacrimony (Angel of Afterlife)", "Falling Like the Fahrenheit" and "My Confession"
- Apollo Papathanasio – vocals on "Grace"
- Niclas Engelin – guitar on "Grace"
- Amanda Somerville – backing vocals, choir vocals, concept

Silverthorn Children's Choir

- Emilie Paeth, Noa Rizzo

Silverthorn Choir

- Robert Hunecke-Rizzo, Thomas Rettke, Simon Oberender, Cinzia Rizzo

Production

- Sascha Paeth – producer, engineer, mixing
- Miro – keyboards, orchestrations, producer, engineering
- Simon Oberender – additional guitars, growls, engineering, mastering
- Olaf Reitmeier – engineering
- Jim Morris – engineering
- Michelle Holtkamp– engineering
- Johan Larsson – engineering
- Kai Schumacher – engineering
- Luca Turilli – Latin consultant
- Stefan Heilemann – cover art

== Charts ==
Chart (2012)	Peak position
Austrian Albums Chart	70
Belgian Ultratop (Flanders)	116
Belgian Ultratop (Wallonia)	133
Canadian Albums Chart	86
Canadian Top Hard Music	7
Finnish Albums Chart	28
French Albums Chart	121
German Albums Chart	36
GfK Dutch Charts	54
Oricon Japanese Albums Chart	65
Norwegian Albums Chart	17
Swedish Albums Chart	20
Swiss Albums Chart	55
Spanish Albums Chart	89
UK Albums Chart	168
UK (Rock & Metal Chart)	17
UK (Indie Chart)	36
US Billboard Top 200	79
US Billboard Hard Rock Albums	9
US Billboard Top Internet	11
US Billboard Independent Albums	14
