= Kamelot =

American power metal band

- Kamelot in 2026; (L–R): Thomas Youngblood, Oliver Palotai, Tommy Karevik, Sean Tibbetts, Alex Landenburg

Background information
- Also known as: Camelot (1987–1991)
- Origin: Tampa, Florida, United States
- Genres: Power metal; heavy metal; progressive metal; symphonic metal
- Works: Discography
- Years active: 1987–present
- Labels: Napalm; Noise; SPV; Sanctuary; Edel
- Members: Thomas Youngblood; Oliver Palotai; Sean Tibbetts; Tommy Karevik; Alex Landenburg
- Past members: See former members
- Website: kamelot.com

Kamelot is an American power metal band from Tampa, Florida, formed by Thomas Youngblood in 1987. The Norwegian vocalist Roy Khan joined for the album Siége Perilous, and shared songwriting credit with Youngblood until his departure in April 2011. On June 22, 2012, Youngblood announced on their website that their new vocalist would be the Swedish singer Tommy Karevik, who was first featured on Kamelot's album Silverthorn as the main vocalist, co-songwriter, and lyricist.

As of 2026, Kamelot has released fourteen studio albums, three live albums, two live DVDs and twenty music videos.

== History ==
=== 1987–1997: Early years, Eternity and Dominion ===
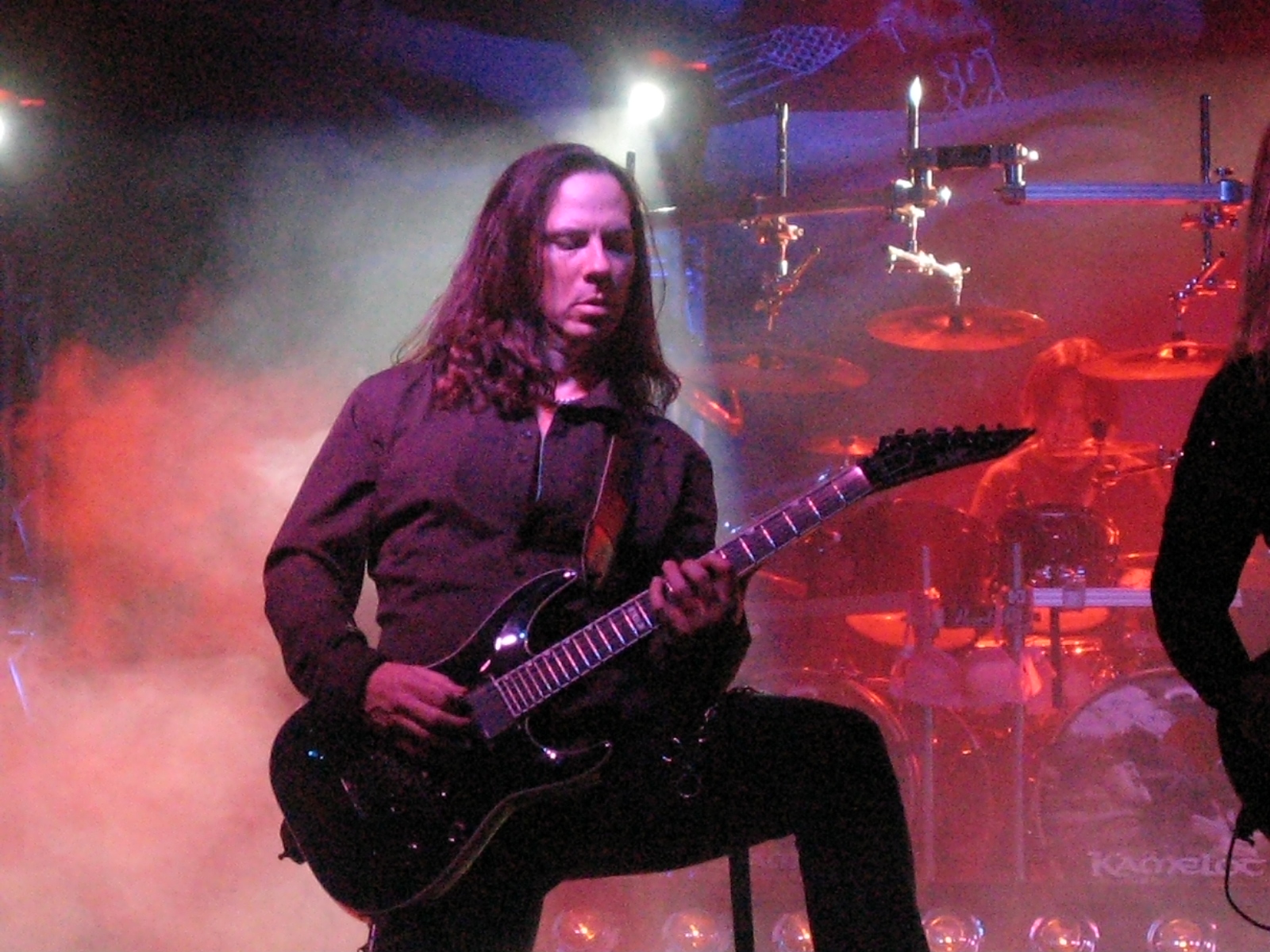
Thomas Youngblood, founding member and guitarist of Kamelot performing in 2009

The band was formed in Florida in 1987 by guitarist Thomas Youngblood, with Richard Warner on drums, Rob Beck on vocals and Dirk Van Tilborg on bass and keyboards, as "Camelot". This name was originally suggested by Youngblood's mother, since she loved John F. Kennedy.

In 1988 they recorded the song "Breaking The Silence", composed by Youngblood and Warner, for Tampa Bay's Metal Mercenaries: The Invasion, a cassette compilation of various heavy metal bands from Tampa Bay produced by Keith "Thumper" Collins (ex-bassist for Savatage).

In 1991 Sean Tibbetts (then using the stage name Sean Christians) joined as bass guitarist, Rob Beck was replaced on vocals by Mark Vanderbilt and Dirk Van Tilborg left the band. The band changed its name to Kamelot due to there being a local record store named Camelot, and to set it apart from the Camelot mythos. This line-up recorded, in the same year, the band's first demo.

In 1992 Glenn Barry replaced Sean Christians on bass guitar. The following year, the band recorded its second demo. After this, David Pavlicko was recruited as keyboardist; in 1993 the band signed a deal with Noise Records and released its first album, Eternity in 1995. The band's next album, Dominion, was released in 1997. Later that year after a tour in Europe, founder Richard Warner departed the band and drummer Casey Grillo was brought in.

=== 1998–2006: Siége Perilous to The Black Halo ===
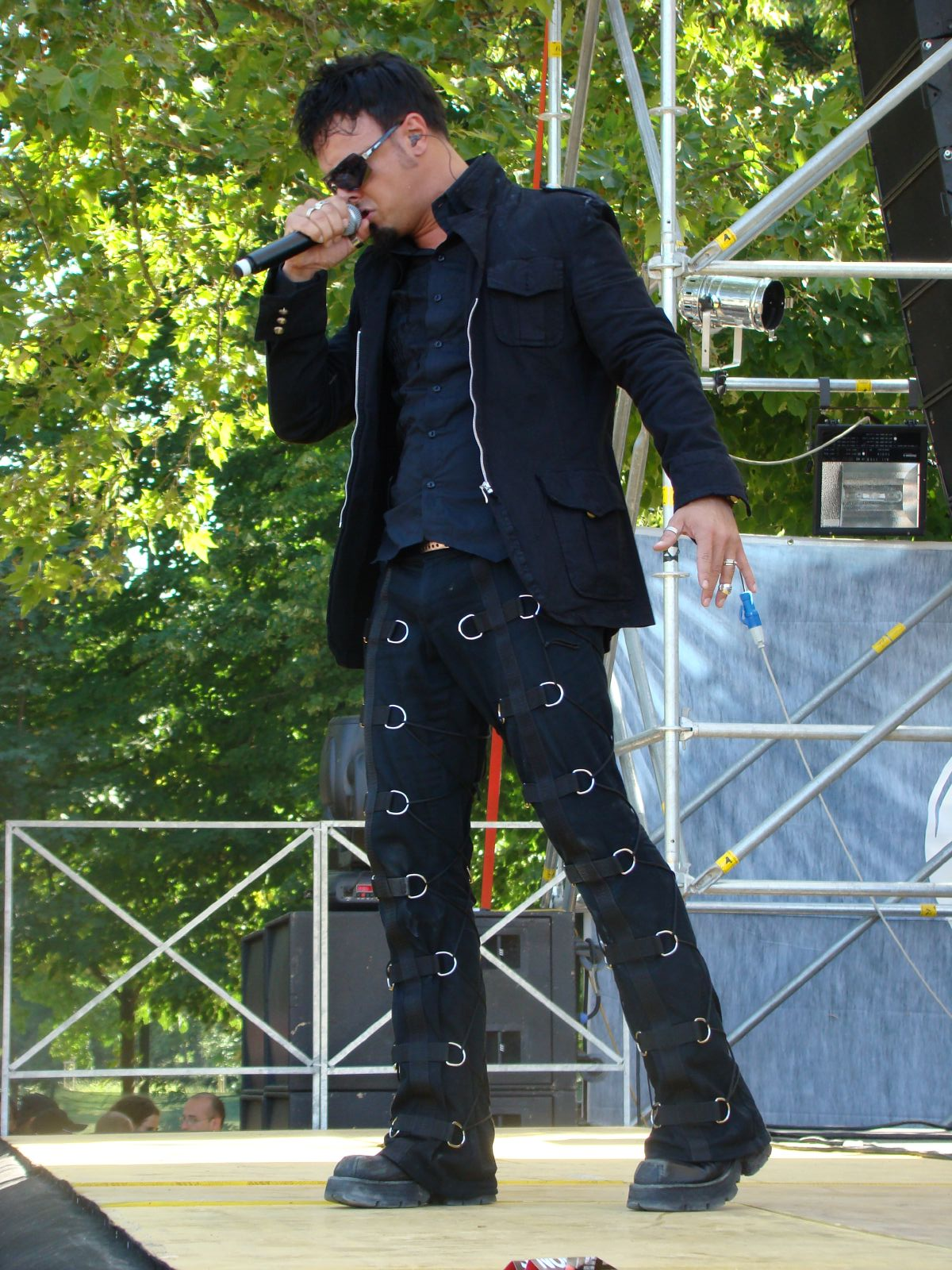
Roy Khan was the lead vocalist in Kamelot from 1998 to 2011

In 1998 Mark Vanderbilt was unable to tour and Roy Khan (of Conception) was recruited as the new lead vocalist. When Roy Khan was selected, he had to prove himself by skydiving with the band. With these two new members, Kamelot released its third studio album, Siége Perilous. The band undertook its first tour later that year, playing shows across Europe.

Following their first European tour and the departure of keyboardist Pavlicko, the band returned to Tampa to write music for a new album, The Fourth Legacy, released in 1999. In mid-2000, Kamelot undertook the New Allegiance Tour through Germany, Austria, Switzerland, the Netherlands, Belgium, Italy, Greece and Spain, during which the recordings for Kamelot's first live album, The Expedition, were made. A few months later, the band released its fifth album, Karma.

The sixth album, Epica, was released in 2003. Both Epica and the band's seventh album, The Black Halo, which was released in 2005, are based on Johann Wolfgang von Goethe's version of the legend of Faust. To support the new album, the band toured through Europe (with At Vance as a supporting band) and Japan. During the first leg of the "Black Halo World Tour 2005", Kamelot played a headliner show with Epica and Kotipelto. In Japan, the supporting group was Silent Force. The band also played at the Bang Your Head!!! Festival in Germany and the Graspop Metal Meeting in Belgium.

In 2005, Kamelot made its first music videos for the songs "The Haunting (Somewhere in Time)" and "March of Mephisto" from the album The Black Halo. Both videos were shot by the prolific director Patric Ullaeus. On October 5, 2005, Kamelot added Oliver Palotai as the fifth official band member; Palotai played both keyboards and (additional) guitars. On the second leg of the Black Halo World Tour, Kamelot visited North America (Canada and the US), South America (Brazil), and Europe (Belgium, the Netherlands, Norway and Sweden). On February 11, 2006, the band's live DVD One Cold Winter's Night was filmed by Patric Ullaeus at the Rockefeller Music Hall in Oslo, Norway. It was released on November 17, 2006, in Germany, on November 20 in other parts of Europe, and on November 21 in the US and Canada via SPV Records.

=== 2007–2011: Ghost Opera, Poetry for the Poisoned and Khan's departure ===
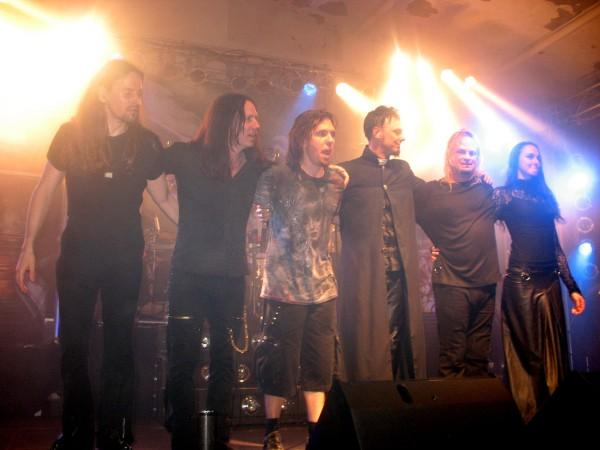
Kamelot after a performance in Köln, 2009

In late 2006 the band returned to Gate Studios in Wolfsburg, Germany, to record the album Ghost Opera, which was released on June 1, 2007 in Germany, on June 4 in the rest of Europe, and on June 5 in the US. The album was recorded and mixed at Gate Studios and Pathway Studios in Wolfsburg with the producers Sascha Paeth and Miro. Music videos were made for the songs "Ghost Opera", "The Human Stain", "Rule the World" and "Love You to Death". A re-issue of Ghost Opera, labeled Ghost Opera: the Second Coming, was released shortly after its predecessor. It contains the entire original Ghost Opera album and a second CD with ten songs recorded during a concert in Belgrade, Serbia, with the additional bonus tracks "Season's End", "The Pendulous Fall", "Epilogue" and "Rule the World (Remixed)". The World Tour 2008-2009 for Ghost Opera included three legs in Europe and one US tour. Support bands were Edguy, Firewind, Leaves' Eyes, Delain and Serenity. During the summers of 2008 and 2009, they played festivals like Wacken Open Air, Rock am Ring, Sonisphere Festival and Metal Rock Fest in Lillehammer. At the TT Circuit Assen they played as support with Within Temptation for Iron Maiden.

In December 2009, Youngblood announced that the bass guitarist Glenn Barry had officially left the band and had been replaced by the touring bass guitarist and former member Sean Tibbetts. In January 2010, Kamelot started working on their ninth studio album, in a cabin in Norway. It was said that the band was exploring "new sounds" and that the topics on the new album would be diverse. During early 2010, Kamelot published the titles of three songs from the upcoming album on their official website: "The Great Pandemonium", "Hunter's Season" and "Thespian Drama". They also revealed that guest musicians would appear: Simone Simons (she provided vocals for the ballad "House on a Hill" and the album's title track), and later Gus G, of the Greek power metal band Firewind.

On March 25, 2010 they began the "Pandemonium over Europe" tour, which ended on April 26, 2010. Afterward, the band revealed that the title of their ninth studio album was Poetry for the Poisoned. It was released by earMUSIC (the international label of the entertainment group Edel) in Europe on September 10, 2010, and by the band's own label KMG Recordings (via Knife Fight Media and Dismanic Distribution) in North America on September 14, 2010. A music video for "The Great Pandemonium" was directed by Owe Lingvall and was released on September 1, 2010. Poetry for the Poisoned entered the US Billboard 200 chart at number 74, selling 6,100 copies in its first week. During the summer of 2010 they played a festival summer tour which included festivals like Wacken Open Air, Rock am Ring, Tuska Open Air Festival, ARTmaИ!a. The last festival of the tour was Sziget Festival on August 14.

On September 6, 2010 the band announced that Khan had fallen seriously ill during rehearsals for the upcoming North American tour, just a few days before its scheduled start, and had returned to Norway. While it was initially reported that the band would continue the tour with the Norwegian vocalist Michael Eriksen of Circus Maximus in Khan's place, the band later announced that it would postpone the tour with Khan, though one show was performed with Eriksen at the ProgPower USA XI festival in Atlanta, Georgia, on September 10, 2010. However, on December 16, due to Khan's lingering illness, it was announced that Fabio Lione of Rhapsody of Fire would replace Khan for the remaining and rescheduled dates on the Pandemonium over Latin America, Europe and North America tours in 2011, and later the 70,000 Tons of Metal Cruise in 2012. Other guest singers appeared on selected shows, such as Simone Simons singing "The Haunting" and "Don't You Cry", Tommy Karevik singing "Center of the Universe", "EdenEcho" and "The Human Stain", Shagrath as Mephisto on "March of Mephisto" and "Memento Mori", Alissa White-Gluz also as Mephisto on "March of Mephisto" and Atle Pettersen on "Karma". On April 15, 2011, the band released Poetry for the Poisoned & Live from Wacken – Limited Tour Edition, containing the audio from Khan's last recorded show with the band.

=== 2012–2014: Arrival of Karevik and Silverthorn ===
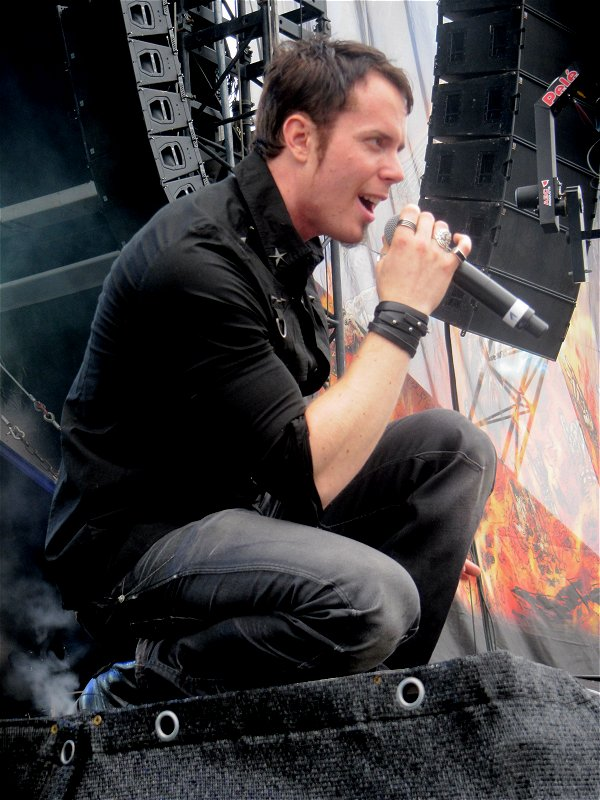
Karevik officially assumed Khan's place as lead vocalist in 2012

Following a period of uncertainty, Khan and Kamelot released separate statements on April 21 and 22 respectively, announcing Khan's departure from the band. According to Youngblood, the band was already searching for a new singer, with the deadline for submissions at the end of January. On June 22, Kamelot introduced Tommy Karevik as their new official vocalist. Karevik had previously appeared as one of the guest singers on the 2011 Pandemonium World Tour.

Kamelot returned to the German label SPV GmbH to release their tenth record (their first with Karevik), which was unveiled as Silverthorn in July, along with a release date of October 26, 2012. A music video was released for the first single from Silverthorn, "Sacrimony (Angel Of Afterlife)". Silverthorn was greeted with positive reviews and the band once again charted in the top 100 on the US Billboard Chart at number 79.

The band joined Nightwish on their Imaginaerum World Tour in North America as special guests during September and October 2012 in the period leading up to the release of Silverthorn, along with guest vocalists Elize Ryd and Alissa White-Gluz. Following the North American tour Kamelot embarked on a European headlining tour during November 2012, with support on the tour coming from Xandria, Triosphere and Blackguard. The band also toured new countries on Silverthorn including Australia, Korea and Taiwan.

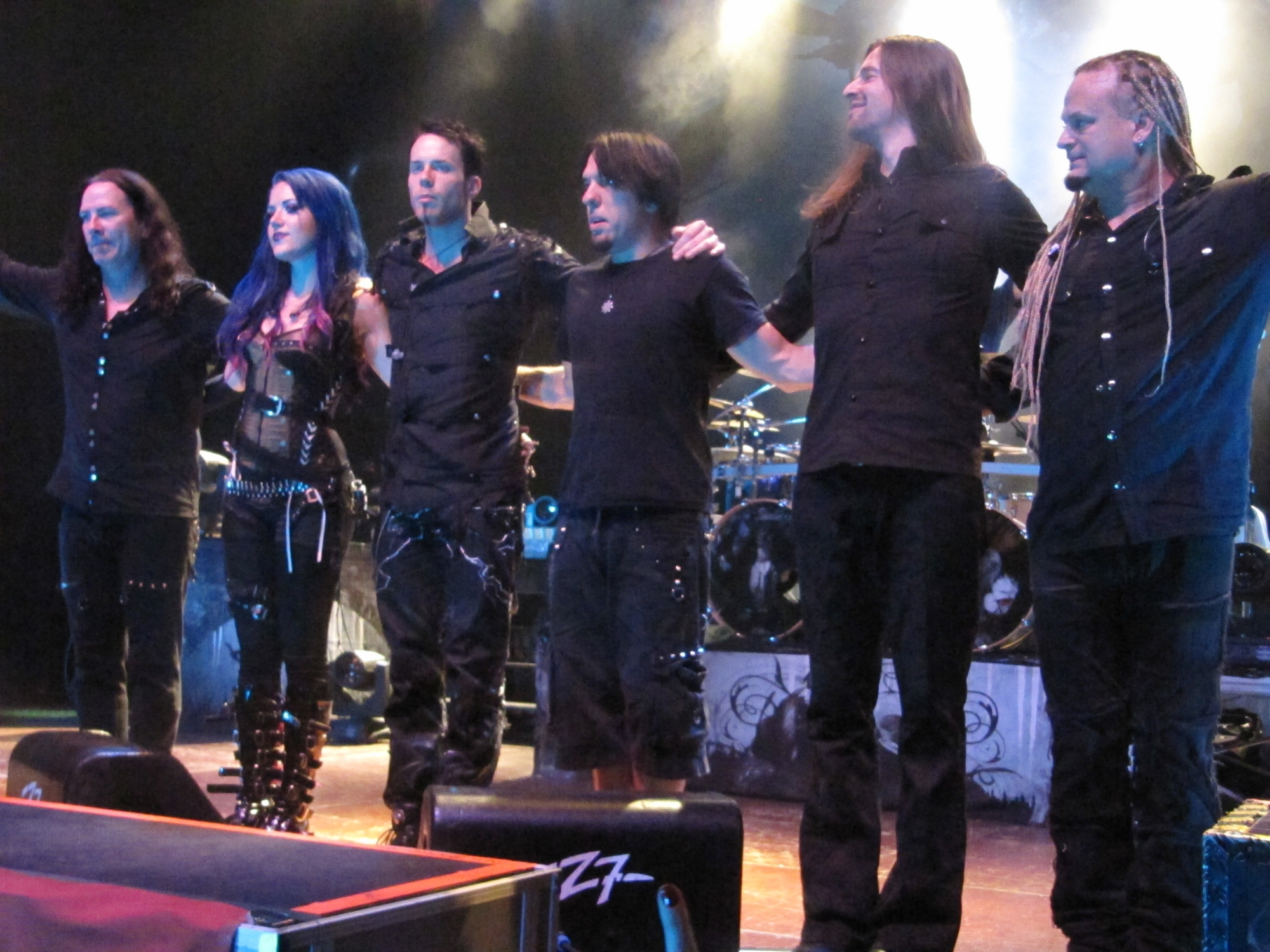
Kamelot after a performance in 2013 with Alissa White-Gluz

The band toured during 2013 with the band Delain, and string quartet Eklipse. During this leg of the tour, keyboardist Oliver Palotai sat out while he and girlfriend Simone Simons of the band Epica awaited the birth of their first child. Epica keyboardist Coen Janssen filled in for Palotai. The touring cycle for the album ended with tours in Europe, North America and finally South America in 2014.

In 2014 the band took some time off from touring, to concentrate on working on the next album. They only played two festivals in Europe, Sweden Rock Festival and Masters@Rock Festival and two club shows: in Trondheim, Norway, and in Haarlem, Netherlands. In Haarlem. they played a special acoustic set that included the live premiere of "Welcome Home" and the acoustic premiere of "Karma".

=== 2015–2019: Haven, The Shadow Theory and line-up changes ===
On February 23, 2015, the name of the eleventh Kamelot album Haven was announced. It was released on May 5 of that year. Alissa White-Gluz, Troy Donockley, and Charlotte Wessels appear as guests on the album. Three music videos were released for Haven: "Insomnia", "Liar Liar (Wasteland Monarchy)" and "My Therapy". The album was well received by critics and fans, which resulted in it entering the US Billboard Chart at number 75 and the Billboard Hard Rock Chart at number one.

Shortly before the release of the album, Kamelot began a new world tour to promote the album, which started in North America with DragonForce as special guests. During summer they played at Masters of Rock, Kavarna Rock Fest and Rock by the River Festival. Later in the year the band returned to Europe with Kobra and the Lotus and Gus G as support. Between their shows in Milan and Strasbourg, they headed to Japan over the weekend, to play at Loud Park Festival for the first time. 2015 was concluded with the second leg of the American tour, again with DragonForce. Kamelot's focus in 2016 continued to be on live shows in support of Haven and brought them again to Europe, but they also toured Japan and South America. In 2016, the band announced that following the end of the third Haven tour and a "couple of more [touring] dates", they would be working on their new studio album.

February 2, 2017 marked the second time for Kamelot joining the metal cruise 70000 Tons of Metal. The band opened for Iron Maiden and Ghost with Exodus on July 1, 2017 at the San Manuel Amphitheater in San Bernardino. Casey Grillo did not attend the show, so Alex Landenburg from Luca Turilli's Rhapsody filled in. 2017 concluded the Haven World Tour with shows in Russia, Greece and Israel.

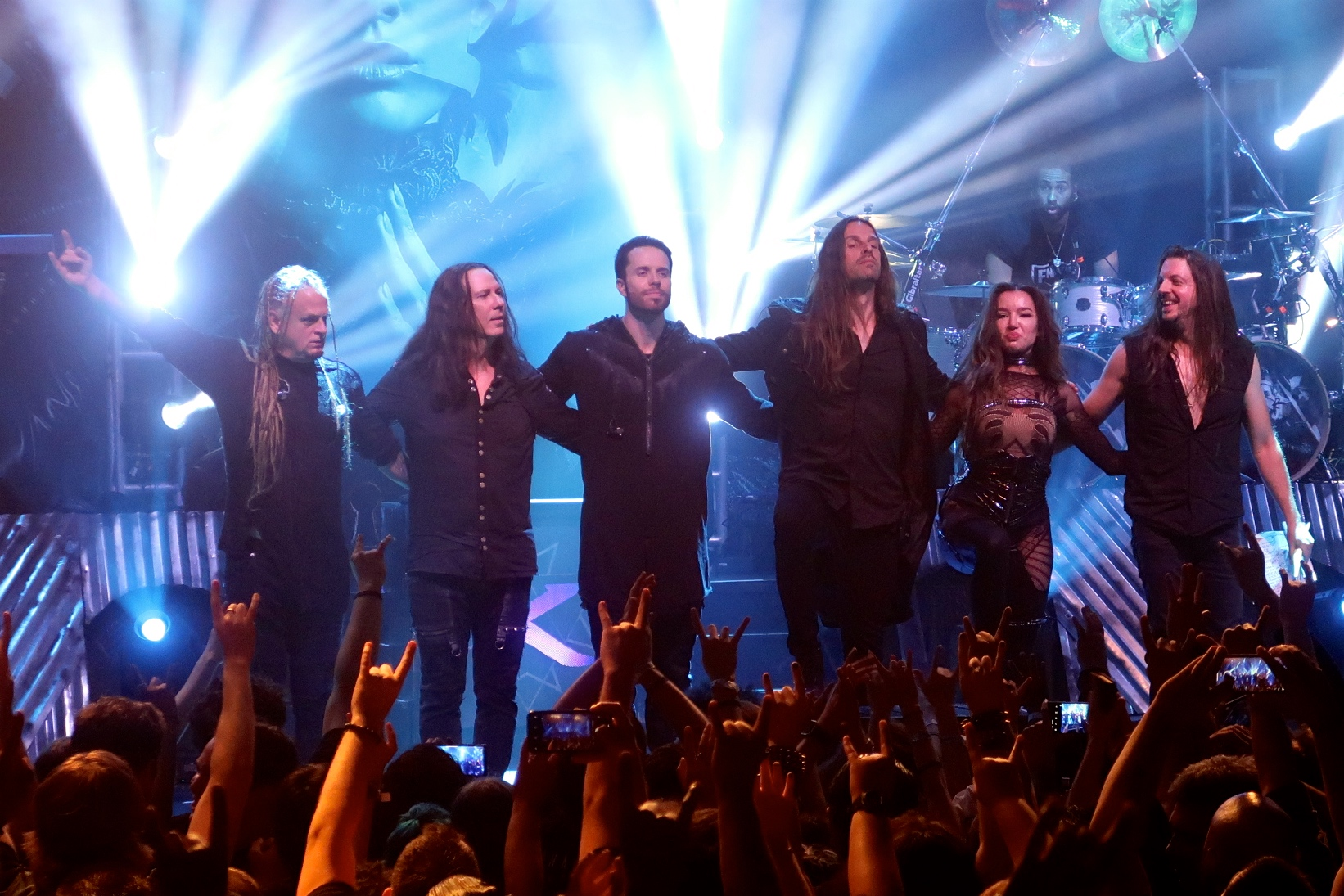
Kamelot after a performance in 2019 with Lauren Hart

On January 25, 2018, Kamelot announced their twelfth studio album, The Shadow Theory. It was released on April 6, 2018. Lauren Hart and Jennifer Haben appear as guests on the album. The album entered the Billboard Hard Rock Chart at number two and peaked the Amazon Hard Rock & Metal Chart at number one. Three music videos were released for The Shadow Theory: "Phantom Divine (Shadow Empire)", "Amnesiac" and "MindFall Remedy". Kamelot announced that longtime member Casey Grillo had departed from the band on February 5, 2018 to "pursue other musical and touring opportunities" and to focus on his drumhead company. On the same day, Firewind drummer Johan Nunez was announced as the replacement drummer.

After the release of the new album, the band began The Shadow Tour to promote the album, starting in North America with Delain and Battle Beast as opening acts. After only two performances, the band announced that Johan Nunez would be stepping away due to injury and that Alex Landenburg would be his live replacement. Over the summer, they performed at European festivals. They toured Europe as headliners with support from Leaves' Eyes, Visions of Atlantis, Circus Maximus and Dynazty, followed by a Japan tour with special guests Witherfall and an Australia tour with Valhalore. Kamelot joined the metal cruise 70000 Tons of Metal for the third time on January 31, 2019. They returned to Europe in the spring with special guests Evergrey and Visions of Atlantis. Alex Landenburg was later announced as the official drummer on April 10, 2019. During the summer the band performed some exclusive European concerts and festivals including headliner shows at the Luppolo in Rock Festival and Z! Live Rock Fest. Kamelot concluded The Shadow Tour with another North American leg in the fall with support from Sonata Arctica and Battle Beast.

The band's third live release, I Am the Empire – Live from the 013, was recorded at the 013 in Tilburg, Netherlands on September 14, 2018 with Charlotte Wessels, Elize Ryd, Alissa White-Gluz, Eklipse and Sascha Paeth as special guests. The DVD/Blu-ray for the live release was later announced on June 3, 2020 with a release date of August 14, 2020.

=== 2020–present: The Awakening and Dark Asylum ===
On February 26, 2020 Kamelot announced that they would release their first book, Veritas: A Kamelot Legacy, via Rocket 88, which would include band memorabilia as well as studio, live and personal photos from the band's career, marking the thirtieth anniversary of Kamelot's founding.

In a June 2020 interview with the "Jones.Show", Youngblood revealed that he, Karevik and Palotai have been working on new material for their upcoming thirteenth album:

We have material for the new album right now that we're working on. And everything is fresh, but it still has this signature sound that we want to have and we feel is important. That's the trick for an artist — you've gotta make sure you give fans what they expect, but you don't want to give them the same thing, because then you're not growing and it's just gonna be boring. But we have been able to do that.

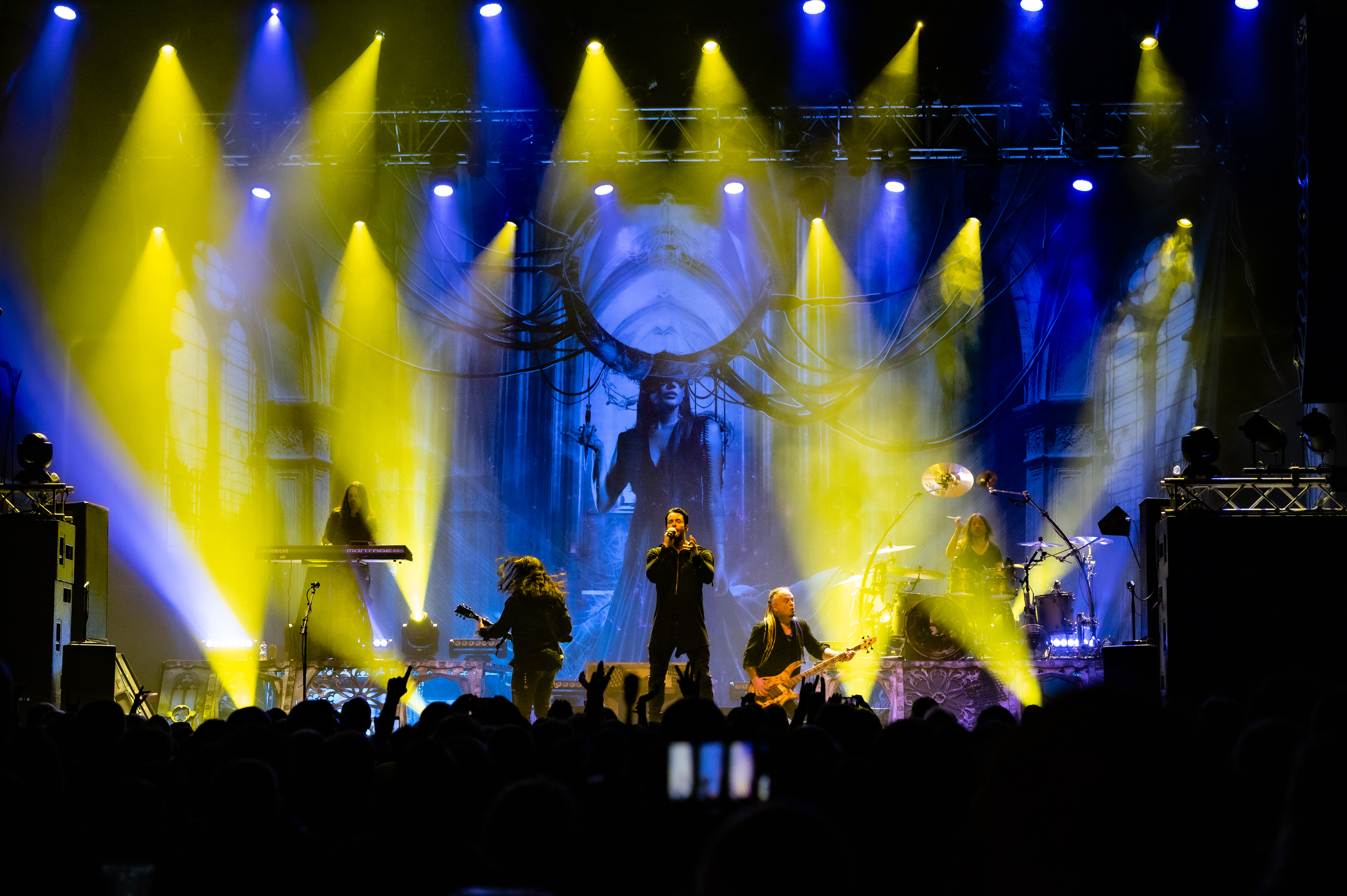
Kamelot performing in 2024

In two interviews with FaceCulture and A&P Reacts, Youngblood had also revealed that twenty-five songs had been written for the new album, of which they would focus on thirteen. Both Youngblood and Karevik had also stated that the band planned to release the new album in August or September 2021, though it originally was set to be released in March. In an October 13, 2020, interview with Gino Alache on the "Rockum Radio Show", Youngblood confirmed that there were twelve songs for the album and the band were preparing to enter the studio to record their thirteenth studio album. When asked about the album's songwriting approach in an interview, Youngblood said that the album will contain a mixture of new elements and influences, with material that fans should expect.

There had been no updates to the upcoming album's release date since passing the 2021 deadlines, but Kamelot produced two music videos for the album in May 2022. In the following month, the band announced that the "final touches of mixing are underway" for the album, which was planned for an early 2023 release, as well as the announcement that cellist Tina Guo would be a featured guest on the album. In addition to being confirmed as a headliner at the 2023 edition of ProgPower USA, the band supported the album by going on a five-day tour in Brazil with Turilli / Lione Rhapsody in February 2023 with Melissa Bonny as a guest vocalist. On December 9, 2022, the band announced the first European leg for their Awaken the World Tour, which began in March 2023. A teaser for the thirteenth studio album was released on January 6, 2023.

Simultaneously with the release of the single "One More Flag in the Ground", on January 12, 2023, the album's title was revealed, as The Awakening, and it was subsequently released on March 17, 2023. Prior to its release, the band had released three singles to promote the album: "Opus of the Night (Ghost Requiem)", "Eventide" and "NightSky".

On September 19, 2025, Kamelot released the Ascension (1995–1998) box set, which contains remastered versions of the band's first three studio albums, and unreleased material.

The band announced the Dark Asylum World Tour on February 24, 2026. The tour features shows in North America with support from Visions of Atlantis and Frozen Crown, and Europe with support from Exit Eden and Temperance. The European leg began in Tilburg, Netherlands as a part of a two-day event called KamFest which took place on October 30 and 31. On May 27, 2026, the band announced their fourteenth studio album, Dark Asylum, which was released on August 28, 2026. The album was supported by the release of three singles: "Ashen World", which features Decessus vocalist and Miss World Chile contestant Ignacia Fernández, "Godlike Alchemy", and "Sanctuary" which features both Clémentine Delauney and Ignacia Fernández. On September 24, 2026, the band announced a second European leg in March 2027 for the Dark Asylum World Tour with support from Cyhra.

== Musical style ==
The band's sound is generally described as power metal, heavy metal, progressive metal, and symphonic metal, with elements of classical music, gothic metal, doom metal and progressive rock. According to AllMusic, the band's sound is known for "juxtaposing metallic power and keen melodic sensibilities."

== Band members ==
Current

- Thomas Youngblood – guitars, backing vocals (1987–present)
- Oliver Palotai – keyboards, additional guitars (2005–present)
- Sean Tibbetts – bass (1991–1992, 2009–present)
- Tommy Karevik – lead vocals (2012–present)
- Alex Landenburg – drums, percussion (2019–present)

Former

- Rob Beck – lead vocals (1987–1991)
- Dirk Van Tilborg – bass, keyboards (1987–1991)
- Richard Warner – drums (1987–1997)
- Mark Vanderbilt – lead vocals (1991–1998)
- David Pavlicko – keyboards (1993–1998)
- Glenn Barry – bass (1992–2009)
- Roy Khan – lead vocals (1998–2011)
- Casey Grillo – drums, percussion (1997–2018)
- Johan Nunez – drums, percussion (2018–2019)

Live and session

- Howard Helm – keyboards (1998–1999)
- Günter Werno – keyboards (2000)
- Sascha Paeth – additional guitars (1999–present)
- Michael "Miro" Rodenberg – keyboards, backing vocals, orchestral arrangements (1999–present)
- Michael Eriksen – lead vocals (2010)
- Fabio Lione – lead vocals (2011–2012)

Live guest musicians

- Elisabeth Kjærnes – additional vocals (2006)
- Mats Olausson – keyboards (2003; died 2015)
- Heather Shockley – additional vocals (2005)
- Mari Youngblood – additional vocals (2005–2007)
- Anne-Catrin Maerzke – additional vocals (2007–2009)
- Amanda Somerville – additional vocals (2009)
- Jake E Berg – vocals (2010–2011)
- Charlotte Wessels – additional vocals (2010, 2018)
- Elize Ryd – additional vocals (2010–2015, 2017, 2018)
- Edu Falaschi – lead vocals (2011)
- Simone Simons – additional vocals (2006–2012)
- Alissa White-Gluz – additional vocals (2011–2016, 2018)
- Coen Janssen – keyboards (2013)
- Linnéa Vikström – additional vocals (2012, 2015)
- Floor Jansen – additional vocals (2013)
- Marcela Bovio – additional vocals (2013–2014)
- Kobra Paige – additional vocals (2015–2017)
- Aeva Maurelle – additional vocals (2016)
- Noora Louhimo – additional vocals (2018–2019)
- Lauren Hart – additional vocals (2018–2019)
- Melissa Bonny – additional vocals (2023–2024)
- Secil Sen – additional vocals (2026)
- Clémentine Delauney – additional vocals (2026)
- Giada Etro – additional vocals (2026)
- Ignacia Fernández – additional vocals (2026)

Session guest musicians

- Dirk Bruinenberg – drums, percussion (1999)
- Robert Hunecke-Rizzo – drums, percussion (1999)
- Cinzia Rizzo – vocals (1999, 2001, 2003, 2005–2007, 2012)
- Mari Youngblood – vocals (2003, 2005–2006)
- Luca Turilli – guitars (2003)
- Amanda Somerville – vocals (2005–2012)
- Simone Simons – vocals (2005–2008, 2010, 2023)
- Shagrath – vocals (2005)
- Jens Johansson – keyboards (2005)
- Elize Ryd – vocals (2012)
- Anne-Catrin Märzke – vocals (2008)
- Jon Oliva – vocals (2010–2011)
- Chanty Wunder – vocals (2010–2011)
- Björn "Speed" Strid – vocals (2010)
- Gus G – guitars (2010)
- Alissa White-Gluz – vocals (2012, 2015)
- Charlotte Wessels – vocals (2015)
- Troy Donockley – uilleann pipes, tin whistle (2015)
- Jennifer Haben – vocals (2018)
- Lauren Hart – vocals (2018)
- Melissa Bonny – vocals (2023)
- Ignacia Fernández – vocals (2026)
- Clémentine Delauney – vocals (2026)
- Tobias Sammet – vocals (2026)
- Rannveig Sif Sigurðardóttir – vocals (2026)
- Sólveig Sara Leupold – vocals (2026)
- Lea-Sophie Fischer – violin (2026)

== Discography ==
Studio albums

- Eternity (1995)
- Dominion (1997)
- Siége Perilous (1998)
- The Fourth Legacy (1999)
- Karma (2001)
- Epica (2003)
- The Black Halo (2005)
- Ghost Opera (2007)
- Poetry for the Poisoned (2010)
- Silverthorn (2012)
- Haven (2015)
- The Shadow Theory (2018)
- The Awakening (2023)
- Dark Asylum (2026)
