= The Expedition =

2000 live album by Kamelot

Live album by Kamelot
- Released: October 2000
- Recorded: April 2000
- Venue: Concerts in Germany and Greece
- Genre: Symphonic power metal
- Length: 60:56
- Label: Noise
- Producer: Sascha Paeth

Kamelot live chronology
The Expedition (2000)	One Cold Winter's Night (2006)

Professional ratings
Review scores
Source	Rating
RevelationZ Magazine	7/10

The Expedition is the first live album by American power metal band Kamelot, released in October 2000 through Noise Records. The last three tracks are rare studio recordings: "We Three Kings" (instrumental) and "One Day" are additional material from the Siege Perilous sessions, and "We Are Not Separate" is a re-recorded version of a song from the Dominion album.

== Track listing ==
1. "Intro" / "Until Kingdom Come"
2. "Expedition"
3. "The Shadow of Uther"
4. "Millennium"
5. "A Sailorman's Hymn"
6. "New Allegiance" / "The Fourth Legacy"
7. "Call of the Sea"
8. "Desert Reign" / "Nights of Arabia"
9. "We Three Kings"
10. "One Day"
11. "We Are Not Separate"

== Personnel ==
=== Band members ===
- Roy Khan – vocals
- Thomas Youngblood – guitar, backing vocals
- Glenn Barry – bass guitar
- Casey Grillo – drums
- Günter Werno – keyboards

=== Production ===
- Recorded by Sascha Paeth from concerts in Germany and Greece April 2000
- Mixed and mastered by Sascha Paeth at Pathway Studios, Wolfsburg, Germany
- Assistants on site: Ralf Schindler, Thomas Kuschewski, Bonni "Q-ryched!" Bilski
- Tracks 9 and 10 recorded in 1998 at Morrisound Studios, Tampa, Florida - engineered By Howard Helm. Keyboards by Howard Helm
- Track 11 recorded in 2000 at Pathway Studios Wolfsburg, Germany - engineered by Sascha Paeth. Keyboards by Miro
- Intro by Hans Zimmer (09.10sec – 10:04sec of "Rocket Away" from the movie soundtrack The Rock)
- Photos by Axel Jusseit, Claudia Ehrhardt, Edwin Van Hoof and Kamelot
- Antique maps: © Photo Essentials
- Artwork and Layout by Maren/Noise Graphics
- Cover photos by Axel Jusseit
