= Ghost Opera =

2007 studio album by Kamelot

Studio album by Kamelot
- Released: June 1, 2007
- Recorded: May 2006–January 2007
- Studios: Gate Studios, Wolfsburg, Germany
- Genres: Power metal; heavy metal; progressive metal; symphonic metal
- Length: 43:59 (Original Album); 47:59 (Limited Edition); 47:31 (Japanese Release); 58:00 (The Second Coming disk 2)
- Label: SPV/Steamhammer
- Producers: Sascha Paeth and Miro

Kamelot chronology
| The Black Halo (2005) | Ghost Opera (2007) | Poetry for the Poisoned (2010) |

Reissue cover
- The Second Coming reissue cover (2008)

Singles from Ghost Opera
- 1. "The Human Stain" Released: 1 May 15, 2007; 2. "Ghost Opera" Released: 8 September 2007; 3. "Rule the World" Released: 27 March 2008; 4. "Love You to Death" Released: 11 May 2009

Professional ratings
Review scores
| Source | Rating |
|---|---|
| AllMusic | 3.5/5 stars |
| Goetia Media | 4/5 stars |

Ghost Opera is the eighth studio album by American power metal band Kamelot. It was released in 2007 by SPV GmbH/Steamhammer Records, on June 1 in Germany and followed by releases on June 4 in Europe and June 5 in the United States. It is the first studio album by Kamelot to feature keyboardist Oliver Palotai, and the last with bassist Glenn Barry. The album spawned four music videos for the songs "Ghost Opera", "The Human Stain", "Rule the World" and "Love You to Death".

On Billboard 200, the album peaked at number 18 on Top Heatseekers and number 48 on Independent Albums.

Prior to the release of the album, SPV Records distributed a strictly limited CD single of "Ghost Opera", handed out to fans attending the European Tour in March, April and May 2007. The album was released on vinyl in the spring of 2009, along with The Black Halo.

== Track listing ==
All songs written by Kamelot.

| No. | Title | Length |
|---|---|---|
| 1. | "Solitaire" | 1:00 |
| 2. | "Rule the World" | 3:40 |
| 3. | "Ghost Opera" | 4:06 |
| 4. | "The Human Stain" | 4:01 |
| 5. | "Blücher" | 4:04 |
| 6. | "Love You to Death" | 5:13 |
| 7. | "Up Through the Ashes" | 4:59 |
| 8. | "Mourning Star" | 4:37 |
| 9. | "Silence of the Darkness" | 3:43 |
| 10. | "Anthem" | 4:25 |
| 11. | "Eden Echo" | 4:13 |
| Total length: | | 43:59 |

Limited Edition bonus track
| No. | Title | Length |
|---|---|---|
| 12. | "The Pendulous Fall" | 3:59 |
| Total length: | | 47:58 |

Japanese bonus track
| No. | Title | Length |
|---|---|---|
| 12. | "Season's End" | 3:32 |
| Total length: | | 47:31 |

The Second Coming Disk 2
| No. | Title | Length |
|---|---|---|
| 1. | "Solitaire" (live) | 1:10 |
| 2. | "Ghost Opera" (live) | 4:06 |
| 3. | "The Human Stain" (live) | 4:15 |
| 4. | "Mourning Star" (live) | 4:31 |
| 5. | "When the Lights are Down" (live) | 4:03 |
| 6. | "Abandoned" (live) | 4:16 |
| 7. | "The Haunting (Somewhere in Time)" (live, feat. Simone Simons) | 4:34 |
| 8. | "Memento Mori" (live) | 9:08 |
| 9. | "Epilogue" (live) | 2:28 |
| 10. | "March of Mephisto" (live) | 4:50 |
| 11. | "Season's End" (Japanese Edition bonus track) | 3:32 |
| 12. | "The Pendulous Fall" (Limited Edition bonus track) | 3:59 |
| 13. | "Epilogue" (The Black Halo Japanese bonus track) | 2:46 |
| 14. | "Rule the World" (remix) | 4:22 |
| Total length: | | 58:00 |

== Limited edition CD + DVD and The Second Coming ==
In 2008, a reissue of Ghost Opera entitled Ghost Opera: The Second Coming was released on March 28 in Germany, March 31 for the rest of Europe and April 8 in the United States and Canada. The album was released as a double-disc set, with the first disc featuring Ghost Opera as previously released, and the videos for "The Human Stain" and "Memento Mori", filmed in Belgrade, Serbia. The second disc contained 10 live tracks from the same show, as well as three bonus tracks from Ghost Opera and The Black Halo and a remix of "Rule the World".

== Charts ==
| Chart (2007) | Peak position |
|---|---|
| Dutch Albums Chart | 51 |
| Finnish Albums Chart | 35 |
| French Albums Chart | 83 |
| German Albums Chart | 61 |
| Greek International Albums Chart | 23 |
| Japanese Albums Chart | 34 |
| Norwegian Albums Chart | 25 |
| Swedish Albums Chart | 29 |
| Swiss Albums Chart | 88 |
| UK (Rock & Metal Chart) | 24 |
| US Billboard Independent Albums | 48 |
| US Billboard Top Heatseekers | 18 |

| Chart (2008) | Peak position |
|---|---|
| Greek Albums Chart | 38 |

== Personnel ==
Credits for Ghost Opera adapted from liner notes.

Kamelot

- Roy Khan – vocals, keyboards
- Thomas Youngblood – guitars
- Glenn Barry – bass
- Casey Grillo – drums, percussion
- Oliver Palotai – keyboards

Additional personnel

- Miro – orchestrations, keyboards
- Simone Simons – female vocals on "Blücher"
- Amanda Somerville – female vocals on "Mourning Star", "Love You to Death", "Season's End" and "Ghost Opera"
- Sascha Paeth – additional guitars

Ghost Opera Choir

- Cinzia Rizzo, Robert Hunecke-Rizzo, Thomas Rettke

Personnel

- Sascha Paeth – producer, engineering
- Miro – producer, engineering
- Olaf Reitmeier – engineering
- Simon Oberender – engineering
- Bredo Myrvang – recording
- Mattias Norén – artwork, layout
- Elin Strigå – photo editing
- Alexandra V Bach – artwork
- Liliana Sanches – photography
