= Aina (German band) =

German progressive metal project

- Genres: Progressive metal; power metal; symphonic metal
- Years active: 2003–2004
- Label: Transmission/The End Records
- Past members: Sascha Paeth; Amanda Somerville; Robert Hunecke-Rizzo; Michael "Miro" Rodenberg

Aina was a German progressive metal project formed by Sascha Paeth with a number of guest appearances, including Glenn Hughes, Michael Kiske and Candice Night. It resulted in the metal opera Days of Rising Doom, released in 2003 by Transmission/The End Records. Amanda Somerville created the concept and wrote the lyrics. The music was composed by Robert Hunecke-Rizzo. Ten years after its release, Paeth indicated that there were no plans to revisit the project.

== Story ==
The album tells the story of a fictional country, Aina, ruled by King Taetius. It begins with a warning delivered to King Taetius (Damian Wilson) from The Prophets. ("Revelations") The story involves a love triangle between Oria Allyahan (Candice Night) and the two sons of King Taetius: Talon (Glenn Hughes) and Torek (Thomas Rettke). ("Silver Maiden") After the death of Taetius, Torek becomes the king of Aina. However, he flees the kingdom in rage and humiliation when Talon is the one that gains lady Oria's hand in marriage. ("Flight of Torek")

Torek befriends a gruesome race known as the Krakhon, to whom he becomes a mix of king and deity; he also takes on the name of their deity, Sorvahr. ("Naschtok Is Born") Quickly, Sorvahr gathers the army of the Krakhon and leads them into a war against the whole world. ("The Beast Within") Eventually he sieges and takes over Aina, casting out his brother, Talon, as well as Talon's wife, Oria, and daughter, Oriana. ("The Siege of Aina") In an effort to preserve his kingdom, Talon sends Oriana away from him where she can be safe. ("Talon's Last Hope") Meanwhile, Sorvahr rapes Oria, who eventually gives birth to Syrius. ("Rape of Oria", "Son of Sorvahr")

Unknowing of their relation to each other (as half-siblings and as enemies), Oriana and Syrius meet one another and fall in love. ("Serendipity") As the couple reaches adulthood, Talon returns to the kingdom with a new army to retake the throne of Aina. ("Rebellion") Talon takes Oriana with him to help lead the army; on the other side, Sorvahr takes Syrius with him to lead the opposing army. As Oriana and Syrius meet in battle, they declare a tentative peace on the battlefield. The peace is shattered when Sorvahr, disgusted with his son for making peace rather than war, kills Syrius. Horrified and enraged, Oriana then takes the fight back to Sorvahr and defeats him on the battlefield. ("Oriana's Wrath") She then takes the throne of the newly reinstated Kingdom of Aina. ("Restoration")

== Track listing ==
=== Disc 1: Days of Rising Doom ===
1. "Aina Overture" - 2:01
2. "Revelations" - 5:29
3. "Silver Maiden" - 5:00
4. "Flight of Torek" - 5:21
5. "Naschtok is Born" - 4:39
6. "The Beast Within" - 3:17
7. "The Siege of Aina" - 6:50
8. "Talon's Last Hope" - 6:10
9. "Rape of Oria" - 3:05
10. "Son of Sorvahr" - 2:58
11. "Serendipity" - 4:04
12. "Lalae Amer" - 4:13
13. "Rebellion" - 4:01
14. "Oriana's Wrath" - 6:13
15. "Restoration" - 4:55

=== Disc 2: The Story of Aina ===
1. "The Story Of Aina (instrumental)" - 15:08
2. "The Beast Within (single version)" - 3:43
3. "Ve Toura Sol-Rape Of Oria (Ainae version)" - 3:05
4. "Flight Of Torek (single version)" - 3:33
5. "Silver Maiden (alternate version)" - 4:59
6. "Talon's Last Hope (demo)" - 5:46
7. "The Siege Of Aina (single version)" - 3:55
8. "The Story Of Aina" - 15:08
9. "Oriana's Wrath (alternate version)" (Japanese Bonus Track) - 6:11

== Personnel ==
Credits for Days of Rising Doom adapted from liner notes.

Aina

- Amanda Somerville – vocals as Maiden Voice and Oriana's Conscience, choir vocals
- Robert Hunecke-Rizzo – drums, guitars, bass, choir vocals, mixing, engineering
- Michael Rodenberg – keyboards, effects, choir vocals, vocals as The Prophet, mixing, engineering

Additional personnel

- Glenn Hughes – Talon
- Michael Kiske – Narrator
- André Matos – Tyran
- Candice Night – Oria
- Sass Jordan – Oriana
- Tobias Sammet – Narrator
- Marko Hietala – Syrius
- Sebastian Thomson – The Storyteller
- Damian Wilson – King Taetius
- Thomas Rettke – Torek (Sorvahr)
- Olaf Hayer – Baktúk
- Cinzia Rizzo – vocals
- Rannveig Sif Sigurdardottir – vocals
- Simone Simons – soprano vocals
- Ann Shee – choir vocals
- Oliver Hartmann – The Prophets
- Herbie Langhans – The Prophets
- The Trinity School Boys Choir – The Angelic Ainae Choir

Additional musicians

- Olaf Reitmeier – acoustic guitars on "Revelations" and "Serendipity", engineering
- Derek Sherinian – keyboard solo on "The Siege of Aina"
- Jens Johansson – keyboard solo on "Revelations"
- T.M. Stevens – bass on "Son of Sorvahr"
- Axel Naschke – organ on "Son of Sorvahr"
- Emppu Vuorinen – guitar solo on "Rebellion"
- Thomas Youngblood – guitar solo on "Lalae Amêr"
- Erik Norlander – keyboard solo on "Rebellion"
- Andreas Pfaff, Gregor Dierck, Thomas Glöckner – violins
- David Schlage, Stefanie Priess – violas
- Jörn Kellermann, Lauri Angervo – cellos

Production

- Sascha Paeth – additional arrangements, mixing, engineering
- Peter van 't Riet – mastering
- Adam Briggs – artwork
- Carsten Drescher – layout
- Marc Klinnert – cover concept, artwork, logo
- Hans van Vuuren – executive producer
