= The Fourth Legacy =

1999 studio album by Kamelot

Studio album by Kamelot
- Released: September 19, 1999
- Recorded: 1999
- Studios: Gate Studio, Wolfsburg, Germany
- Genre: Symphonic power metal
- Length: 48:18
- Label: Noise/Modern Music
- Producers: Sascha Paeth and Miro

Kamelot chronology
Siége Perilous (1998)	The Fourth Legacy (1999)	Karma (2001)

Professional ratings
Review scores
Source	Rating
RevelationZ Magazine	7.5/10

The Fourth Legacy is the fourth studio album by American power metal band Kamelot. It was released in 1999 by Noise Records/Modern Music. It is the first album to credit vocalist Roy Khan as a writer on all tracks, establishing him as the main songwriter of the band together with founder and guitarist Thomas Youngblood.

== Track listing ==
All tracks are written by Roy Khan and Thomas Youngblood, except where noted.

No.	Title	Length
1.	"New Allegiance" (instrumental)	0:54
2.	"The Fourth Legacy"	4:55
3.	"Silent Goddess"	4:15
4.	"Desert Reign" (instrumental)	1:39
5.	"Nights of Arabia"	5:26
6.	"The Shadow of Uther" (Glenn Barry, Khan, Youngblood)	4:45
7.	"A Sailorman's Hymn"	4:05
8.	"Alexandria"	3:54
9.	"The Inquisitor" (Barry, Khan, Youngblood)	4:35
10.	"Glory"	3:42
11.	"Until Kingdom Come"	4:11
12.	"Lunar Sanctum"	5:59
Total length:		48:18

Japanese bonus track
No.	Title	Length
13.	"Can You Remember" (live)	4:27
Total length:		52:45

== Personnel ==
All information from the album booklet.

Kamelot

- Roy Khan – vocals
- Thomas Youngblood – guitars, backing vocals
- Glenn Barry – bass guitar
- Casey Grillo – drums

Additional musicians

- Miro – keyboards and orchestral arrangements
- Sascha Paeth – additional guitars
- Thomas Rettke – background vocals on "Nights of Arabia", "Until Kingdom Come" and "Alexandria"
- Dirk Bruinenberg – additional drums
- Robert Hunecke-Rizzo – additional drums
- Rannveig Sif Sigurdardóttir – backing vocals on "A Sailorman's Hymn"
- Cinzia Rizzo – female vocals on "Nights of Arabia"
- Farouk Asjadi – flute and additional percussion on "Desert Reign"
- Andre Neygenfind – double bass on "Nights of Arabia"
- Fallersleben String Quartet – strings
- Simon McTavish – flute

Production

- Sascha Paeth – producer, mixing, mastering
- Miro – producer
- Derek Gores – cover art, design
- Thomas Kuschewski – photography

== See also ==
- Scheherazade in popular culture
- Alexandria
