= Thomas Youngblood =

American guitarist

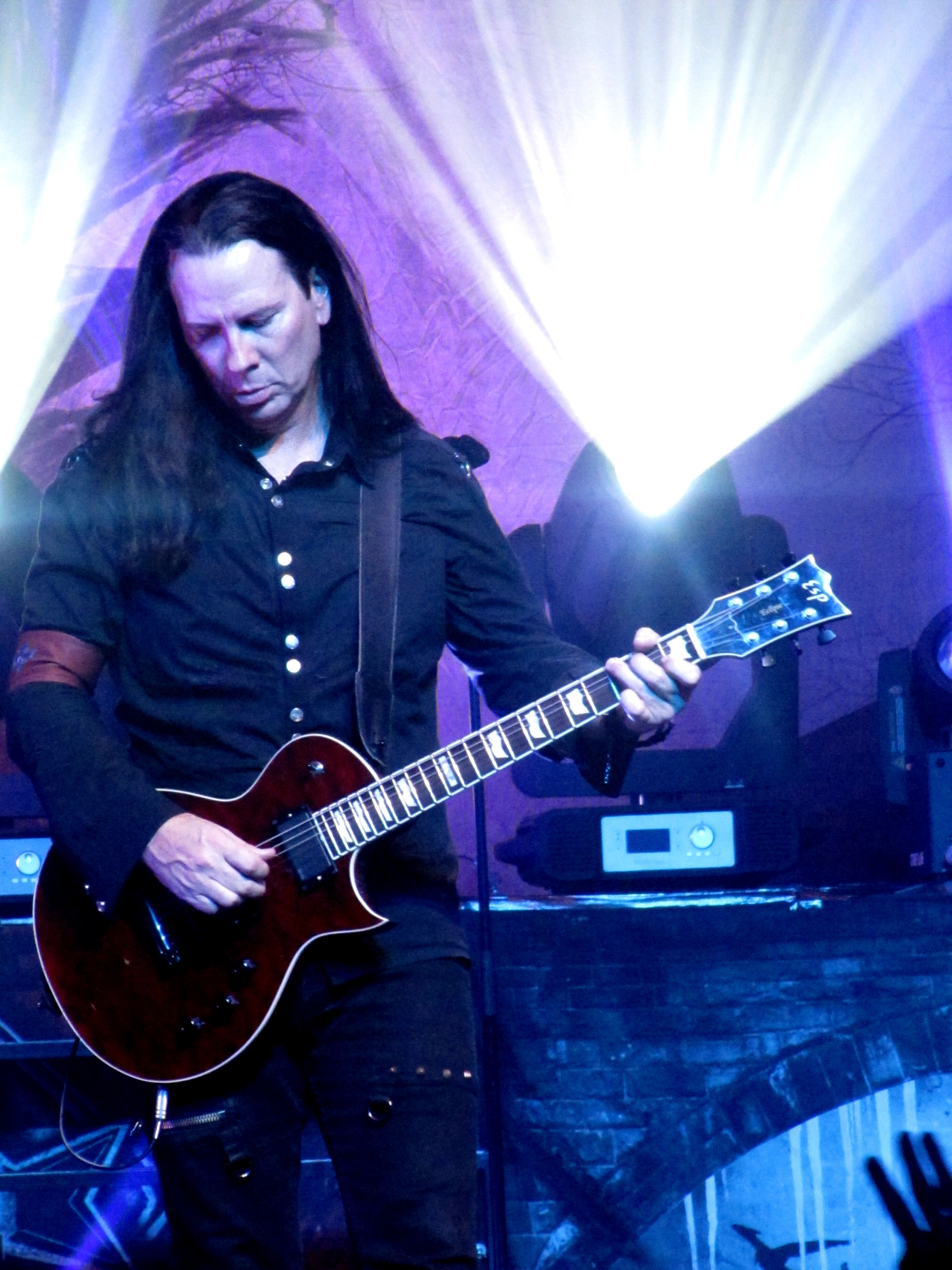
- Youngblood performing in 2013

Background information
- Born: May 29, 1974 (age 52); Richmond, Virginia, United States
- Origin: Tampa, Florida, United States
- Genres: Power metal, progressive metal, symphonic metal
- Occupations: Musician, songwriter
- Instrument: Guitar
- Years active: 1988–present
- Member of: Kamelot, Consortium Project
- Website: thomasyoungblood.com

Thomas Youngblood (born May 29, 1974) is an American guitarist, songwriter, and founding member of power metal band Kamelot.

== Early life ==
At the age of 12, after the death of his father, Youngblood moved from Virginia to Florida where he started learning to play guitar at age 15. Shortly after his move he began playing in his first band with school mates from the neighborhood. Through this he met drummer Richard Warner, and they decided to start a band together.

== Career ==
Kamelot was founded in Tampa, Florida by Youngblood and Richard Warner in 1991. They signed their first contract in 1994 with German label Noise Records. Six albums were released through the label. After the release of Epica in 2003 they started working with SPV/Steamhammer. With them they released The Black Halo (2005) and Ghost Opera (2007), after a temporary switch to Edel Music for the release of Poetry for the Poisoned (2010), they were back with SPV for another release with Silverthorn (2012). Currently the band is under contract with Napalm Records, Universal, ADA/Warner and King Records and released the album Haven in 2015.

Youngblood was the main composer of Kamelot's music from 1994 to 1998, collaborating with singer Roy Khan from 1998 to 2010. When Khan decided to leave the band, Tommy Karevik (Seventh Wonder) became the new singer. The new composing/writing team of the band consists of Thomas Youngblood, Oliver Palotai (keyboards), Sascha Paeth (producer) and Tommy Karevik (vocals). During Kamelot live shows Youngblood sings backing vocals and harsh vocals ("March of Mephisto") if needed. The song "Don't You Cry" is dedicated to his father and "Hunter's Season" to his mother.

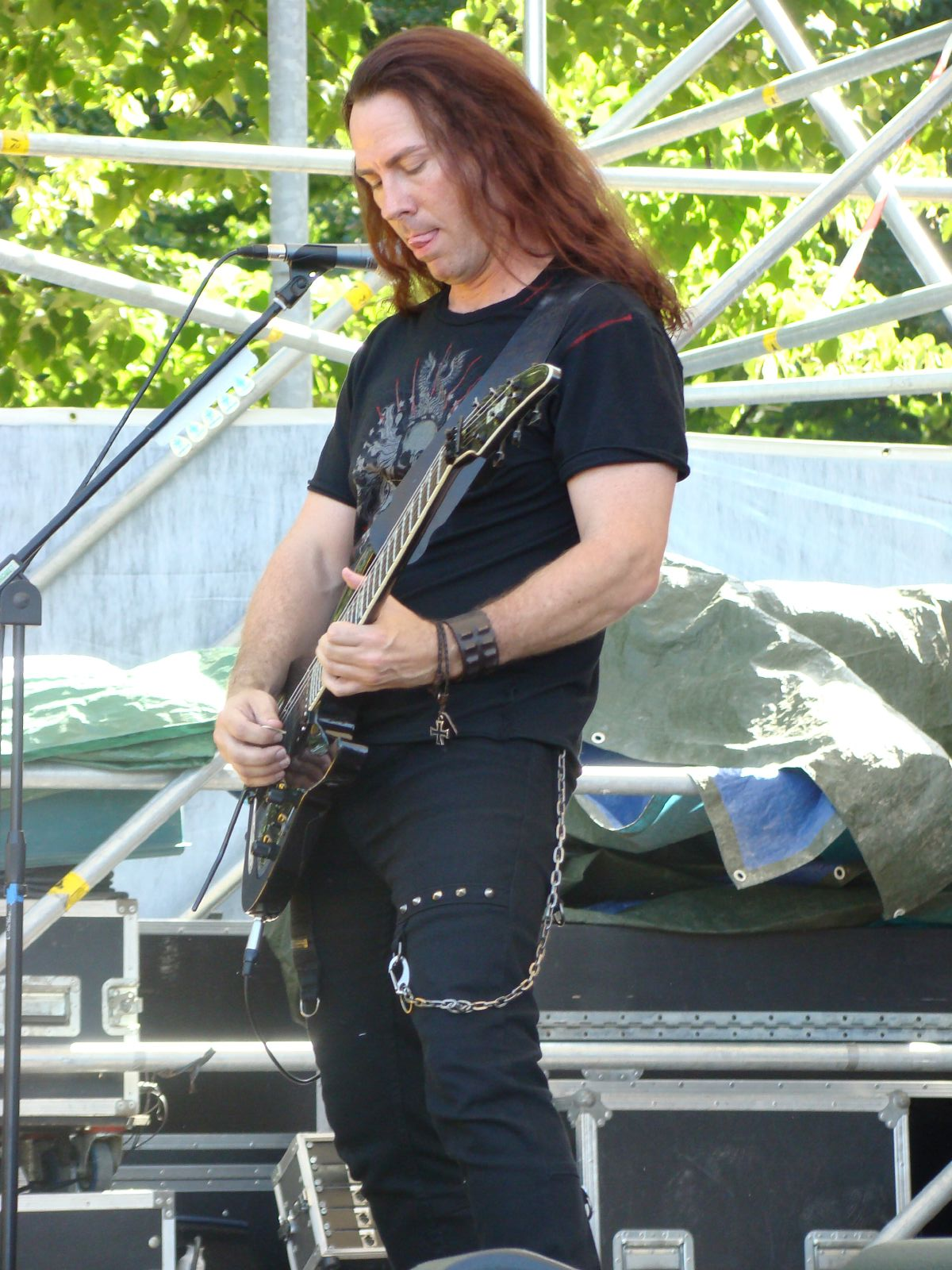
Youngblood in 2007

Youngblood is the only founding member continuously active in the band since its formation. He is also the CEO of KMI Entertainment, who are responsible for Kamelot's management and booking. With Kamelot, Youngblood played multiple headliner tours during the last 20 years in America, Asia, Australia and Europe and some of the biggest festivals like Wacken Open Air, Sweden Rock Festival, Sonisphere Festival, and Rock am Ring. After Kamelot released their 2023 studio album, The Awakening, the first single of the album, "One More Flag in the Ground", was under consideration for the Grammy for Best Metal Performance.

Youngblood collaborated with Mark Vanderbilt (ex-Kamelot vocalist) in the late 1990s for a project called "Monarque". The song "Arion" was released on the compilation CD "Powerquest – The Awakening".

Consortium Project is the brainchild of Ian Parry, vocalist of the Dutch band Elegy. Youngblood and Ian Parry met when Elegy toured with Kamelot in 1998. When the first album Consortium Project was recorded, Youngblood was part of it. Other contributions by Patrick Rondat, Arjen Lucassen, Stephan Lill and others. Youngblood also contributed on the second album Continuum in Extremis in 2001. He has co-songwriting credits for "Poetic Justice".

In 2003, Youngblood was invited to play guitars on the metal opera Days of Rising Doom by supergroup Aina, a project of Amanda Sommerville, Sascha Paeth, Robert Hunecke-Rizzo and Michael Rodenberg.

In 2003, another collaboration between Ian Parry and Thomas Youngblood came to fruit. They recorded the song "Flight of Icarus" for the Iron Maiden tribute double album Slave to the Power.

== Personal life ==
Youngblood lives in Tampa with his wife Mari who is a soprano vocalist. Mari Youngblood made appearances as guest artist on Kamelot's Epica and The Black Halo, as well as live appearances in 2007 and on the live DVD One Cold Winter's Night.

The voice of their daughter, Annelise, appears in "Soul Society" (The Black Halo) and the nursery rhyme of "Sacrimony" (Silverthorn). The voice of their son Thomas can be heard as the chorus in "Burns to Embrace" (The Shadow Theory)

His inspirations are varied and range from metal to new age. In addition to playing guitar, Youngblood plays drums, saxophone and keyboard.

== Discography ==
=== Kamelot ===
==== Studio albums ====
- Eternity (1995/Noise Records) CD
- Dominion (1997/Noise Records) CD
- Siége Perilous (1998/Noise Records) CD
- The Fourth Legacy (1999/Noise Records) CD
- Karma (2001/Noise Records) CD (German Album Charts #85)
- Epica (2003/Noise Records) CD (Finnish Album Charts #28)
- The Black Halo (2005/SPV/Steamhammer) CD, Vinyl (Swedish Album Charts #24)
- Ghost Opera (2007/SPV/Steamhammer) CD, Vinyl (Norwegian Album Charts #25)
- Poetry for the Poisoned (2010/Edel Music) CD, Vinyl (Billboard Top 200 Charts #74)
- Silverthorn (2012/SPV/Steamhammer) CD, Vinyl (Billboard Top 200 Charts #79)
- Haven (2015/Napalm Records) CD, Vinyl (Billboard Top 200 Charts #75)
- The Shadow Theory (2018/Napalm Records) CD, Vinyl (German Album Charts #13)
- The Awakening (2023/Napalm Records) CD, Vinyl
- Dark Asylum (2026/Napalm Records) CD, Vinyl

==== Live albums ====
- The Expedition (2000) CD
- One Cold Winter's Night (2006) CD
- I Am the Empire – Live from the 013 (2020) CD, Vinyl

==== DVDs ====
- One Cold Winter's Night (2006) DVD
- I Am the Empire – Live from the 013 (2020) DVD, Blu-ray

=== Guest appearances ===
- Power Quest: The Awakening Compilation – guitars and writing credits on "Arion" by Monarque (KMI Entertainment)
- Ian Parry's Consortium Project I (1999/Mascot Label Group) – guitars on "Change Breeds Contempt”
- Ian Parry's Consortium Project II – Continuum in Extremis (2001/Inside Out Music) – guitars and writing credits on "Poetic Justice”
- Aina – Days of Rising Doom (2003/The End Records) – guitars on "Lalae Amêr”
- Slave to the Power (2003/MeteorCity) – guitars on "Flight of Icarus"

== Publications ==
- Overnight Success – Columnist for Headbangers Lifestyle (October 29, 2015)

== TV appearances ==
- MTV's Headbangers Ball – Host (October 16, 2010)
- Metal Evolution – Episode: Power Metal (Documentary, 2012)
