= Poetry for the Poisoned =

2010 studio album by Kamelot

- Cover art by Seth Siro Anton

Studio album by Kamelot
- Released: September 10, 2010
- Recorded: 2009–2010
- Studios: Gate Studios, Wolfsburg, Germany
- Genres: Progressive metal; heavy metal; power metal
- Length: 50:04
- Labels: Avalon (Japan), earMUSIC (Europe), KMG Recordings (North America)
- Producers: Sascha Paeth and Miro

Kamelot chronology
Ghost Opera (2007)	Poetry for the Poisoned (2010)	Silverthorn (2012)

Reissue cover
- Live from Wacken – Limited Tour Edition reissue cover (2011)

Singles from Poetry for the Poisoned
- 1. "The Great Pandemonium" Released: 11 October 2010; 2. "Hunter's Season" Released: 30 June 2011; 3. "Necropolis" Released: 21 November 2011

Professional ratings
Review scores
Source	Rating
AllMusic	3.5/5 stars
Dangerdog	5/5 stars
Darkscene	8.5/10 stars
Metal Temple	8/10 stars
Metalstorm	(6.9/10)
Metalunderground	4/5 stars

Poetry for the Poisoned is the ninth studio album by American power metal band Kamelot. It was released on the earMUSIC label, a subdivision of Edel, on September 10, 2010 in Europe, and four days later in North America by the band's own label, KMG Recordings, in conjunction with Knife Fight Media.

It is the last Kamelot album with longtime lead vocalist and songwriter Roy Khan who left the band in 2011, and the first with original bass guitarist Sean Tibbetts, who left the band in 1992 prior to any release and returned in 2009 after 17 years.

A video was recorded for the song "The Great Pandemonium" and released on the band's official YouTube channel on September 6.

== Track listing ==
No.	Title	Writer(s)	Length
1.	"The Great Pandemonium" (featuring Björn "Speed" Strid)	Roy Khan, Thomas Youngblood	4:24
2.	"If Tomorrow Came"	Khan, Sascha Paeth	3:58
3.	"Dear Editor"	Khan, Youngblood	1:18
4.	"The Zodiac" (featuring Jon Oliva & Amanda Somerville)	Khan, Youngblood, Paeth	4:00
5.	"Hunter's Season" (featuring Gus G.)	Khan, Youngblood	5:34
6.	"House on a Hill" (featuring Simone Simons)	Khan, Youngblood, Paeth	4:14
7.	"Necropolis"	Khan, Youngblood	4:16
8.	"My Train of Thoughts"	Khan, Youngblood	4:08
9.	"Seal of Woven Years"	Khan, Youngblood	5:13
10.	"Poetry for the Poisoned, Pt. I: Incubus"	Khan, Youngblood	2:57
11.	"Poetry for the Poisoned, Pt. II: So Long" (featuring Simone Simons)	Khan, Youngblood	3:24
12.	"Poetry for the Poisoned, Pt. III: All is Over" (featuring Simone Simons)	Khan, Youngblood	1:03
13.	"Poetry for the Poisoned, Pt. IV: Dissection"	Khan, Oliver Palotai	2:00
14.	"Once Upon a Time"	Khan, Youngblood	3:45

=== Bonus tracks ===
No.	Title	Writer(s)	Length
15.	"Thespian Drama (instrumental)" (Japanese / vinyl single edition bonus track / iTunes bonus track)	Palotai	3:46
16.	"Where the Wild Roses Grow" (featuring Chanty Wunder, EU limited edition bonus track)	Nick Cave	3:59
17.	"House on a Hill (uncut version)" (US DVD edition bonus track / 2LP bonus track)	Khan, Youngblood, Paeth	5:02

== Special edition DVD ==
- "The Great Pandemonium" (video)
- Pick and Play for the song "The Great Pandemonium"
- Live at Norway Rock Festival 2010
- Interviews with each Kamelot member
- Background Images
- "House on a Hill" (uncut version) (US version only)

== Limited tour edition ==
In 2011, a reissue of Poetry for the Poisoned entitled Poetry for the Poisoned & Live From Wacken: Limited Tour Edition was released on April 15 in Europe and May 10 in the US. The album was released as a double-disc set, with the first disc featuring Poetry for the Poisoned as previously released and the second disc contained 8 live tracks from their show at Wacken Open Air 2010.

=== Track listing ===
Disc 1:

No.	Title	Writer(s)	Length
1.	"The Great Pandemonium" (featuring Björn "Speed" Strid)	Roy Khan, Thomas Youngblood	4:24
2.	"If Tomorrow Came"	Khan, Sascha Paeth	3:58
3.	"Dear Editor"	Khan, Youngblood	1:18
4.	"The Zodiac" (featuring Jon Oliva & Amanda Somerville)	Khan, Youngblood, Paeth	4:00
5.	"Hunter's Season" (featuring Gus G.)	Khan, Youngblood	5:34
6.	"House on a Hill" (featuring Simone Simons)	Khan, Youngblood, Paeth	4:14
7.	"Necropolis"	Khan, Youngblood	4:16
8.	"My Train of Thoughts"	Khan, Youngblood	4:08
9.	"Seal of Woven Years"	Khan, Youngblood	5:13
10.	"Poetry for the Poisoned, Pt. I: Incubus"	Khan, Youngblood	2:57
11.	"Poetry for the Poisoned, Pt. II: So Long" (featuring Simone Simons)	Khan, Youngblood	3:24
12.	"Poetry for the Poisoned, Pt. III: All Is Over" (featuring Amanda Somerville)	Khan, Youngblood	1:03
13.	"Poetry for the Poisoned, Pt. IV: Dissection"	Khan, Oliver Palotai	2:00
14.	"Once Upon a Time"	Khan, Youngblood	3:45
15.	"Where the Wild Roses Grow" (featuring Chanty Wunder)	Nick Cave	4:51

Disc 2 – Live from Wacken Open Air 2010:

No.	Title	Writer(s)	Length
1.	"The Great Pandemonium"	Khan, Youngblood	4:28
2.	"Human Stain"	Kamelot	4:24
3.	"Center of the Universe"	Kamelot	5:37
4.	"Pendulous Fall"	Kamelot	3:57
5.	"Hunter's Season"	Khan, Youngblood	5:16
6.	"Karma"	Khan, Youngblood	5:27
7.	"Forever"	Khan, Youngblood	10:14
8.	"March of Mephisto"	Kamelot	7:31

== Charts ==
Chart (2010)	Peak position
Austrian Albums Chart	57
Belgian Albums Chart	40
Canadian Albums Chart	11
Dutch Albums Chart	43
Finnish Albums Chart	21
French Albums Chart	54
German Albums Chart	32
Greek Albums Chart	24
Italian Albums Chart	57
Japanese Albums Chart	55
Norwegian Albums Chart	7
Swedish Albums Chart	23
Swiss Albums Chart	48
UK Albums Chart	155
US Billboard Top 200	72
US Billboard Hard Rock Albums	6
US Billboard Independent Albums	15

== Personnel ==
Credits for Poetry for the Poisoned adapted from liner notes.

Kamelot

- Roy Khan – vocals
- Thomas Youngblood – guitars
- Sean Tibbetts – bass
- Oliver Palotai – keyboards
- Casey Grillo – drums, percussion

Additional personnel

- Sascha Paeth – additional guitars, mixing, mastering
- Miro – additional keyboards, orchestrations
- Simone Simons – vocals on "House on a Hill" and "Poetry for the Poisoned, Pt. II–III"
- Björn "Speed" Strid – screams on "The Great Pandemonium"
- Jon Oliva – vocals on "The Zodiac"
- Gus G. – guitar solo on "Hunter's Season"
- Amanda Somerville – choir vocals on "Poetry for the Poisoned, Pt. I-IV" and vocals on "The Zodiac"
- Chanty Wunder – female vocals on "Where the Wild Roses Grow"
- Robert Hunecke-Rizzo – backing vocals
- Simon Oberender – backing vocals
- Thomas Rettke – backing vocals
- Cloudy Yang – backing vocals

Production

- Sascha Paeth – producer, mixing, mastering, engineering
- Miro – producer, engineering
- Roy Khan - producer
- Olaf Reitmeier - producer, engineering
- Seth Siro Anton – cover art, artwork
- Michał Loranc – additional artwork, layout
- Natalie Shau – additional artwork
- Alexandra Dekimpe – additional artwork
- Rachel Youngblood – additional artwork
