= Haven (Kamelot album) =

2015 studio album by Kamelot

Studio album by Kamelot
- Released: May 5, 2015
- Genres: Symphonic metal; power metal; progressive metal
- Length: 54:53
- Labels: Napalm/Universal, Napalm/ADA/Warner
- Producer: Sascha Paeth

Kamelot chronology
Silverthorn (2012)	Haven (2015)	The Shadow Theory (2018)

Singles from Haven
- 1. "Veil of Elysium" Released: April 1, 2015; 2. "Insomnia" Released: April 26, 2015; 3. "Liar Liar (Wasteland Monarchy)" Released: September 9, 2015; 4. "My Therapy" Released: May 4, 2016; 5. "Under Grey Skies" Released: December 22, 2017

Haven is the eleventh studio album by American power metal band Kamelot, released in North America on May 5, 2015 and world-wide on May 8. The album is produced by Sascha Paeth and mastered by Jacob Hansen. The cover and artwork were created by Stefan Heilemann and the additional art/layout were done by Gustavo Sazes. It features guest appearances by Alissa White-Gluz, Troy Donockley and Charlotte Wessels. It is also the band's first album with Napalm Records.

It is the final studio album to feature Casey Grillo on drums.

Professional ratings
Review scores
Source	Rating
AllMusic	4/5 stars
AntiHero Magazine	8/10 stars
Metal Storm	8/10 stars
Blabbermouth	8.5/10 stars

== Track listing ==
No.	Title	Length
1.	"Fallen Star"	4:39
2.	"Insomnia"	4:13
3.	"Citizen Zero"	5:49
4.	"Veil of Elysium"	3:54
5.	"Under Grey Skies" (featuring Charlotte Wessels and Troy Donockley)	4:52
6.	"My Therapy"	4:26
7.	"Ecclesia"	0:44
8.	"End of Innocence"	3:49
9.	"Beautiful Apocalypse" (featuring Charlotte Wessels)	4:25
10.	"Liar Liar (Wasteland Monarchy)" (featuring Alissa White-Gluz)	5:54
11.	"Here's to the Fall"	4:04
12.	"Revolution" (featuring Alissa White-Gluz)	4:49
13.	"Haven"	2:14
Total length:		54:53

Japanese edition
No.	Title	Length
14.	"The Ties That Bind"	3:52

Vinyl edition
No.	Title	Length
14.	"At First Light"	5:07

Exclusive bonus CD (available only with the limited mediabook and deluxe earbook)
No.	Title	Length
1.	"End of Innocence" (Piano Version)	3:35
2.	"Veil of Elysium" (Acoustic Version)	3:07
3.	"Fallen Star" (Orchestral Version)	4:52
4.	"Here's to the Fall" (Orchestral Version)	4:05
5.	"My Therapy" (Orchestral Version)	4:22
6.	"Fallen Star" (instrumental version)	4:40
7.	"Insomnia" (instrumental version)	4:12
8.	"Citizen Zero" (instrumental version)	5:51
9.	"Veil of Elysium" (instrumental version)	3:54
10.	"Under Grey Skies" (instrumental version)	4:52
11.	"My Therapy" (instrumental version)	4:26
12.	"End of Innocence" (instrumental version)	3:50
13.	"Beautiful Apocalypse" (instrumental version)	4:27
14.	"Liar Liar (Wasteland Monarchy)" (instrumental version)	5:54
15.	"Revolution" (instrumental version)	4:49

== Personnel ==
Credits for Haven adapted from liner notes.

=== Kamelot ===
- Tommy Karevik – lead vocals
- Thomas Youngblood – guitars, backing vocals, orchestral arrangements
- Sean Tibbetts – bass
- Oliver Palotai – keyboards, orchestral arrangements
- Casey Grillo – drums, percussion

=== Additional musicians ===
- Alissa White-Gluz – female vocals on "Liar Liar (Wasteland Monarchy)", grunts on "Liar Liar (Wasteland Monarchy)" and "Revolution"
- Troy Donockley – tin whistle on "Under Grey Skies"
- Charlotte Wessels – female vocals on "Under Grey Skies", backing vocals on "Beautiful Apocalypse"
- Cloudy Yang – backing vocals on "Revolution"
- Sascha Paeth – additional guitars
- Dennis Hornung – contrabass on "Fallen Star"
- Miro – additional keyboards on "Veil of Elysium" and "End of Innocence", engineering (additional)

=== Choir ===
- Cloudy Yang, Grazia Sposito, Herbie Langhans, Thomas Rettke

=== Production ===
- Jacob Hansen – mastering
- Stefan Heilemann – artwork, layout
- Gustavo Sazes – additional artwork, layout
- Jim Morris – recording, engineering (drums)
- Andrew Boullianne – recording, engineering (assistant) (drums)
- Philip Collodetti – engineering (additional)
- Olaf Reitmeier – engineering (additional)
- Tim Tronckoe – photography
- Nina Lahtinen – clothes
- Ville Juurikkala – photography (Troy Donockley)

== Charts ==
Chart (2015)	Peak position
Austrian Albums (Ö3 Austria)	41
Belgian Albums (Ultratop Flanders)	54
Belgian Albums (Ultratop Wallonia)	104
Dutch Albums (Album Top 100)	23
Finnish Albums (Suomen virallinen lista)	12
French Albums (SNEP)	150
German Albums (Offizielle Top 100)	14
Hungarian Albums (MAHASZ)	23
Japanese Albums (Oricon)	28
Spanish Albums (Promusicae)	73
Swedish Albums (Sverigetopplistan)	44
Swiss Albums (Schweizer Hitparade)	24
UK Independent Albums (Official Charts)	18
UK Rock & Metal Albums (Official Charts)	5
US Billboard 200	75
US Independent Albums (Billboard)	6
US Top Rock Albums (Billboard)	10
US Top Hard Rock Albums (Billboard)	1
