= Epica (Kamelot album) =

2003 studio album by Kamelot

Studio album by Kamelot
- Released: March 3, 2003
- Recorded: June – October 2002
- Studios: Gate Studio, Wolfsburg, Germany, Apple Recording Studio and Braden Studio, Tampa, Florida
- Genres: Symphonic metal; power metal; progressive metal
- Length: 52:12
- Label: Noise / Sanctuary
- Producers: Sascha Paeth and Miro

Kamelot chronology
Karma (2001)	Epica (2003)	The Black Halo (2005)

Professional ratings
Review scores
Source	Rating
Metal Storm	10/10 stars
RevelationZ Magazine	6.5/10

Epica is the sixth studio album by American power metal band Kamelot, released on March 3, 2003, through Noise Records. It was the first concept album by Kamelot. This album, along with its sequel, The Black Halo (2005), is a rock opera inspired by the story of Goethe's Faust. Epica tells Part 1 while The Black Halo tells Part 2. (Goethe's Faust has two parts.) Most of the lyrics were written before the music was composed. The album inspired the naming of the band Epica after its release.

In 2017 and 2019, respectively, Loudwire and Metal Hammer ranked it as the 18th and 22nd best power metal album of all time.

== Characters ==
- Ariel (Roy Khan) – Ariel is a curious, determined, and arrogant man. An unparalleled genius and an accomplished scientist and philosopher, he has become disappointed with the inability of these disciplines to answer his deepest questions and seeks to uncover the universal truth that they have failed to provide. He strongly believes that discovering such transcendent knowledge is the only thing that can make his life worthwhile. He is based on the character Heinrich Faust from Goethe's Faust.
- Helena (Mari) – Helena grew up with Ariel, and loves him deeply. She is the only person that Ariel has ever truly loved. She represents innocence and all that is pure and good. She is based on Gretchen from Goethe's Faust.
- Mephisto (Roy Khan) – Mephisto is a rebellious angel who was cast out of Heaven. He desperately yearns to reenter Heaven and be reunited with God. He deeply disdains humans, whom he considers inferior beings unworthy of God's love. Mephisto is one of the only characters to retain his name from the original Faust story.

== Plot ==
The story takes place at an unknown time and place on Earth. God has commanded all angels to serve alongside humans on the Earth, but one angel named Mephisto has refused to obey this order, claiming that he takes orders from God alone. For this, Mephisto is expelled from heaven. God eventually decides to give Mephisto one chance: If Mephisto can claim the soul of God's favorite man, an alchemist and scholar named Ariel, then can he return to heaven. If not, then Mephisto will be condemned to hell forever. ("Prologue"). Mephisto agrees and searches for Ariel.

Meanwhile, Ariel is introduced, and he begins to ponder his research on the true meaning of life and why God created humans ("Center of the Universe"). He concludes that neither science nor religion can truly answer these questions. Feeling restless, he decides to leave his home country to search for answers. He bids his farewell to everyone, including his lover Helena, as he departs on a quest for answers, vowing never to return. (Farewell) Years pass as Ariel searches. He becomes addicted to drugs (Interlude I: Opiate Soul) and eventually turns to the occult, during which he sees a brief vision of Mephisto. (The Edge of Paradise) He begins to think of Helena, whom he misses greatly, while aimlessly walking through the wilderness, regretting his decision to leave. ("Wander") He gives up his search and decides to commit suicide, believing that he will never find the answers he is looking for. (Interlude II: Omen) But before Ariel has the chance, Mephisto arrives and proposes a deal: Mephisto will help Ariel in his search for the questions, and fulfill all his worldly desires; in return, Mephisto will claim Ariel's soul when he dies. (Descent of the Archangel) Ariel is then mysteriously transported to Mephisto's castle (Interlude III: At the Banquet), where the fallen angel throws a feast in his honor. At the feast, Ariel agrees to Mephisto's contract, but with one modification: Mephisto can only claim Ariel's soul if Ariel experiences joy so sublime that he wishes to live forever in that moment. Mephisto begrudgingly accepts this deal. (A Feast for the Vain)

After leaving Mephisto's castle, Ariel is found by Helena, who has been searching for him over the years since he left. Ariel is shocked and overjoyed. (On the Coldest Winter Night) Ariel and Helena sleep together, and a child is conceived, unbeknownst to both of them. After spending some time with Helena, Ariel decides to leave and continue his search for the truth. With the newfound power that Mephisto has provided him, he feels that the answers are within his grasp. Ariel tells Helena of his intent to go, saying that, while he loves her, "love means nothing to me, if there is a higher place to be." (Lost & Damned) After Ariel leaves, Helena is heartbroken and, vowing that she will continue to love Ariel even in death, drowns herself in a river, also unknowingly killing her unborn child. Both are brought to heaven at the plea of the river spirit. (Helena's Theme) Helena's body is then discovered, and a town crier announces her suicide. (Interlude IV: Dawn) After learning of Helena's suicide and pregnancy, Ariel becomes increasingly upset and weeps at the river where Helena died. (The Mourning After (Carry On))

Consumed with grief, Ariel questions whether he should continue his quest. He blames both God and himself for Helena's death, but Mephisto encourages Ariel to continue his journey, claiming that human emotion will ultimately be their demise, calling it a curse. In Ariel's weakened state, Mephisto's influence over him grows, and he agrees to continue his quest. Helena watches him from heaven. (Ill Ways to Epica)

Ariel's story continues in The Black Halo.

== Track listing ==
All tracks are written by Roy Khan and Thomas Youngblood.

No.	Title	Length
1.	"Prologue" (instrumental)	1:07
2.	"Center of the Universe" (feat. Mari Youngblood)	5:27
3.	"Farewell"	3:43
4.	"Interlude I: Opiate Soul"	1:09
5.	"The Edge of Paradise"	4:09
6.	"Wander"	4:24
7.	"Interlude II: Omen" (instrumental)	0:40
8.	"Descent of the Archangel"	4:35
9.	"Interlude III: At the Banquet"	0:30
10.	"A Feast for the Vain"	3:57
11.	"On the Coldest Winter Night"	4:09
12.	"Lost and Damned"	4:58
13.	"Helena's Theme" (feat. Mari Youngblood)	1:51
14.	"Interlude IV: Dawn"	0:27
15.	"The Mourning After (Carry On)"	4:59
16.	"III Ways to Epica" (feat. Mari Youngblood)	6:16
Total length:		52:12

Limited edition bonus track
No.	Title	Length
17.	"Snow"	4:21
Total length:		56:33

Japanese bonus track
No.	Title	Length
17.	"Like the Shadows"	3:45
Total length:		55:57

== Charts ==
Chart (2003)	Peak position
Finnish Albums Chart	28
Japanese Albums Chart	47
German Albums Chart	59
French Albums Chart	117

== Personnel ==
All information from the album booklet.

Kamelot

- Roy Khan – vocals
- Thomas Youngblood – guitars, backing vocals
- Glenn Barry – bass guitar
- Casey Grillo – drums

Additional musicians

- Miro – keyboards and orchestral arrangements
- Sascha Paeth – additional guitars
- Mari Youngblood – female vocals on "Center of the Universe", "Helena's Theme" and "III Ways to Epica"
- Luca Turilli – guitar solo on "Descent of the Archangel"
- Günter Werno – keyboards
- Jan P. Ringvold – keyboards
- Robert Hunecke-Rizzo – choir vocals
- Cinzia Rizzo – choir vocals, Djembe on "On the Coldest Winter Night"
- Annie Langhans – choir vocals
- Herbie Langhans – choir vocals
- Fabricio Alejandro – Bandoneón on "Lost & Damned"
- Rodenberg Symphony Orchestra – orchestrations
- Olaf Reitmeier – Acoustic bass on "On the Coldest Winter Night"
- John Wilton – Master of Ceremonies on "At the Banquet", river spirit on "Helena's Theme"
- Andre Neygenfind – D-bass on "On the Coldest Winter Night"

Production

- Sascha Paeth – producer, mixing, mastering, engineering
- Miro – producer, engineering
- Derek Gores – artwork
