= One Cold Winter's Night =

2006 live album by Kamelot

Video by Kamelot
- Released: November 14, 2006
- Recorded: Rockefeller Music Hall, Oslo, Norway, February 11, 2006
- Genres: Symphonic metal; power metal; progressive metal
- Length: 90:36 (CD only)
- Label: SPV/Steamhammer
- Director: Patric Ullaeus
- Producers: Thomas Youngblood & Roy Khan

Kamelot live chronology
One Cold Winter's Night (2006)	I Am the Empire – Live from the 013 (2020)

One Cold Winter's Night

Live album by Kamelot
- Released: November 14, 2006
- Recorded: Rockefeller Music Hall, Oslo, Norway, February 11, 2006
- Genres: Symphonic metal; power metal; progressive metal
- Length: 90:36 (CD only)
- Label: SPV/Steamhammer
- Producer: Patric Ullaeus

Kamelot live chronology
The Expedition (2000)	One Cold Winter's Night (2006)	I Am the Empire – Live from the 013 (2020)

Professional ratings
Review scores
Source	Rating
AllMusic	3/5 stars
Metal Storm	8.6/10 stars
The Metal Crypt	5/5 stars
Chronicles of Chaos	9.5/10 stars
Sea of Tranquility	5/5 stars
The Metal Circus	9/10 stars

One Cold Winter's Night is the second live album by American power metal band Kamelot, released in 2006 on the SPV label Steamhammer in Germany. It is the second live album and first live DVD from the band, and was released on November 14, 2006. It marks the first appearance of Oliver Palotai on keyboards. The album featured guest appearances by Simone Simons while the second disc of the DVD set contained a number of interviews and videos.

The CD release contained the audio from the live in Oslo, Norway on 11 February 2006.

== DVD track listing ==
=== Disc One - The Concert ===
1. "Intro: Un assassinio molto silenzioso"
2. "The Black Halo"
3. "Soul Society"
4. "The Edge of Paradise"
5. "Center of the Universe"
6. "Nights of Arabia ”
7. "Abandoned"
8. "Forever"
9. "Keyboard Solo"
10. "The Haunting (Somewhere in Time)"
11. "Moonlight"
12. "When the Lights Are Down"
13. "Elizabeth (Parts I, II & III)"
14. "March of Mephisto"
15. "Karma"
16. "Drum Solo"
17. "Farewell"
18. "Curtain Call/Outro"

=== Disc 2 - Extras ===
Journey Within:

- HaloVision with Khan
- Up Close with Thomas Youngblood at home
- Casey Grillo at the drums
- Up Close Interview with Casey Grillo at home
- Up Close with Oliver Palotai
- Interview with Simone Simons from the band Epica

Videos:

- "The Haunting"
- "March of Mephisto"
- "March of Mephisto" (uncensored)
- "Serenade"
- Making of "The Haunting"
- "March of Mephisto" – Live at Sweden Rock 2006

Miscellaneous:

- Photo Gallery including two slideshows of concert photos and band's private photos
- Band Member Biographies and Top Fives
- Discography

== CD track listing ==
=== Disc one ===
1. "Intro: Un assassinio molto silenzioso" – 0:56
2. "The Black Halo" – 3:39
3. "Soul Society" – 4:35
4. "The Edge of Paradise" – 4:44
5. "Center of the Universe" – 6:02
6. "Nights of Arabia" – 6:26
7. "Abandoned" – 4:10
8. "Forever" – 7:55
9. "Keyboard Solo" – 1:45
10. "The Haunting (Somewhere in Time)" – 4:33
11. "Moonlight" – 5:10

=== Disc two ===
1. "When the Lights Are Down" – 4:29
2. "Elizabeth (Parts I, II & III)" – 13:01
3. "March of Mephisto" – 5:06
4. "Karma" – 5:41
5. "Drum Solo" – 2:50
6. "Farewell" – 5:22
7. "Outro" – 4:10
8. "Epilogue" – 2:40 (Japanese bonus track)

== Charts ==
Chart (2006)	Peak position
Japanese Albums Chart	197
Japanese DVD Chart	280

== Line-up ==
=== Kamelot ===
- Roy Khan – vocals
- Thomas Youngblood – guitars, backing vocals
- Glenn Barry – bass guitar
- Casey Grillo – drums
- Oliver Palotai – keyboards

=== Guest musicians ===
- Simone Simons – Marguerite on "The Haunting"
- Mari Youngblood – Helena on "Center of the Universe", "Abandoned" and Elizabeth Bathory on "Elizabeth pt I, II & III"
- Elisabeth Kjærnes – "Nights of Arabia" and "March of Mephisto"
- Snowy Shaw – acting Mephisto on "March of Mephisto"
- Halo choir: Karianne Kjærnes, Marianne Follestad, and Christian Kjærnes
- Voice of Mephisto on "March of Mephisto" by Shagrath
- Additional vocals on "Elizabeth" by Liv Nina Mosveen
- Vocals on "Un Assassinio Molto Silenzioso" by Cinzia Rizzo
