= Dark Asylum =

Studio album by Kamelot
- Released: August 28, 2026
- Length: 51:15
- Label: Napalm
- Producers: Sascha Paeth; Kamelot

Kamelot chronology
The Awakening (2023)	Dark Asylum (2026)

Singles from Dark Asylum
- 1. "Ashen World" Released: July 2, 2026; 2. "Godlike Alchemy" Released: July 29, 2026; 3. "Sanctuary" Released: August 27, 2026

Dark Asylum is the fourteenth studio album by American power metal band Kamelot. The album was released on August 28, 2026, via Napalm Records.

== Track listing ==
No.	Title	Length
1.	"Sanctorium"	1:39
2.	"Ashen World" (featuring Ignacia Fernández)	4:13
3.	"Dark Asylum"	4:39
4.	"Sanctuary" (featuring Clémentine Delauney and Ignacia Fernández)	4:25
5.	"Nocte Veritas"	0:46
6.	"One Last Masquerade" (featuring Tobias Sammet)	4:40
7.	"Ivy, My Dear"	4:34
8.	"Godlike Alchemy"	3:05
9.	"The Sleeping Mind (Orphic Paradigm)"	3:55
10.	"Kaleidoscope"	3:52
11.	"Enigma (Think of Me)"	4:56
12.	"Cassandra's Disease"	3:29
13.	"Beneath the Moon (Tunglið)" (featuring Rannveig Sif Sigurðardóttir, Sólveig Sara Leupold and Lea-Sophie Fischer)	2:06
14.	"The Puppet King"	3:01
15.	"Sanctum Requiem"	1:55
Total length:		51:15

Japanese edition bonus track
No.	Title	Length
16.	"Dreamer"

== Personnel ==
All information from the album booklet.

Kamelot

- Tommy Karevik – lead vocals
- Thomas Youngblood – guitars
- Sean Tibbetts – bass
- Oliver Palotai – keyboards, mixing
- Alex Landenburg – drums

Additional personnel

- Ignacia Fernández – guest vocals (tracks 2, 4)
- Clémentine Delauney – guest vocals (track 4)
- Tobias Sammet – guest vocals (track 6)
- Kobra Paige – additional vocals (track 7)
- Kiara Huber – additional vocals (track 3)
- Rannveig Sif Sigurðardóttir – guest vocals (track 13)
- Sólveig Sara Leupold – guest vocals (track 13)
- Lea-Sophie Fischer – violin (track 13)

Crew

- Sascha Paeth – production, engineering, additional guitars
- Michael Rodenberg – strings, arrangements (track 7)
- Billy King – choir and backing vocals
- Phil Hillen – engineering
- Jacob Hansen – mixing, mastering
- Corvin Bahn – mixing
- Peter Sallai – cover art
- Nina Korento – clothing
- Timo Maczollek – photography
- Natalie Enemede – photo editing
- Vadim "Vidick" Ojog – photo editing

== Charts ==
Chart performance for Dark Asylum
Chart (2026)	Peak position
Austrian Albums (Ö3 Austria)	24
Belgian Albums (Ultratop Flanders)	133
Belgian Albums (Ultratop Wallonia)	42
Finnish Physical Albums (Suomen virallinen lista)	7
French Physical Albums (SNEP)	66
French Rock & Metal Albums (SNEP)	26
German Albums (Offizielle Top 100)	19
German Rock & Metal Albums (Offizielle Top 100)	8
Japanese Albums (Oricon)	44
Japanese Rock Albums (Oricon)	6
Japanese Top Albums Sales (Billboard Japan)	44
Norwegian Physical Albums (IFPI Norge)	7
Swedish Hard Rock Albums (Sverigetopplistan)	11
Swedish Physical Albums (Sverigetopplistan)	10
Swiss Albums (Schweizer Hitparade)	11
UK Albums Sales (Official Charts)	91
UK Independent Albums (Official Charts)	28
UK Rock & Metal Albums (Official Charts)	10
