= Karma (Kamelot album) =

2001 studio album by Kamelot

Studio album by Kamelot
- Released: July 9, 2001
- Recorded: December 2000 – March 2001
- Studios: Gate Studio (Wolfsburg, Germany)
- Genres: Symphonic power metal; progressive metal
- Length: 55:55
- Label: Sanctuary
- Producers: Sascha Paeth and Miro

Kamelot chronology
The Fourth Legacy (1999)	Karma (2001)	Epica (2003)

Professional ratings
Review scores
Source	Rating
AllMusic	2/5 stars
RevelationZ Magazine	8/10

Karma is the fifth studio album by American power metal band Kamelot. It was released on July 9, 2001 through Noise Records which is a part of Sanctuary Records.

== Track listing ==
All tracks are written by Roy Khan and Thomas Youngblood, except where noted.

No.	Title	Writer(s)	Length
1.	"Regalis Apertura" (instrumental)	Miro	1:57
2.	"Forever"		4:07
3.	"Wings of Despair"		4:32
4.	"The Spell"		4:20
5.	"Don't You Cry"		4:18
6.	"Karma"		5:11
7.	"The Light I Shine on You"		4:15
8.	"Temples of Gold"		4:11
9.	"Across the Highlands"		3:46
10.	"Elizabeth I: Mirror Mirror"		4:23
11.	"Elizabeth II: Requiem for the Innocent"		3:46
12.	"Elizabeth III: Fall from Grace" (silence after 4:14)		11:00
Total length:			55:55

iTunes bonus track & US edition
No.	Title	Length
13.	"Ne pleure pas" (French version of "Don't You Cry")	4:14
Total length:		60:09

Japanese edition
No.	Title	Length
13.	"Once and Future King"	4:29
Total length:		60:24

== Personnel ==
All information from the album booklet.

Kamelot

- Roy Khan – vocals
- Thomas Youngblood – guitars
- Glenn Barry – bass
- Casey Grillo – drums, percussion

Additional musicians

- Miro – keyboards, orchestrations, backing vocals
- Sascha Paeth – additional guitars
- Farouk Asjadi – Shakuhachi
- Liv Nina Mosven – vocals on "Requiem for the Innocent" and "Fall from Grace"
- Olaf Hayer – choir vocals
- Cinzia Rizzo – choir vocals, backing vocals on "Karma"
- Robert Hunecke-Rizzo – choir vocals

Strings quartet

- Tobias Rempe – violin
- Corinna Guthmann – violin
- Marie-Theres Stumpf – viola
- Patrick Sepec – cello

Production

- Miro – producer, mixing, mastering, engineering
- Sascha Paeth – producer, mixing, mastering, engineering
- Kim Grillo – photography
- Derek Gores – artwork

== Charts ==
Chart (2001)	Peak position
German Albums Chart	85

== Notes ==
- "Forever" is based on "Solveig's Song", written by Edvard Grieg for his Peer Gynt Suites.
- "Don't You Cry" is dedicated to Thomas Youngblood Sr., who died when his son was very young.
- "Ne Pleure Pas" is essentially the same song as "Don't You Cry", only sung in French.
- The trilogy of songs that close the album on the normal edition, "Elizabeth" I, II & III, are based on the story of Elizabeth Bathory.
- There is silence from the end of "Fall From Grace" to 11:00. This is because Karma was Kamelot's fifth studio album and they wanted its duration to be 55:55. The silence is kept intact even in versions of the album with bonus tracks.
