= The Shadow Theory =

2018 studio album by Kamelot

Studio album by Kamelot
- Released: April 6, 2018
- Genres: Symphonic metal; progressive metal; power metal
- Length: 52:13
- Label: Napalm
- Producers: Sascha Paeth, Kamelot

Kamelot chronology
Haven (2015)	The Shadow Theory (2018)	The Awakening (2023)

Singles from The Shadow Theory
- 1. "RavenLight" Released: March 3, 2018; 2. "Phantom Divine (Shadow Empire)" Released: March 29, 2018; 3. "Amnesiac" Released: May 29, 2018; 4. "MindFall Remedy" Released: September 5, 2018; 5. "Vespertine (My Crimson Bride)" Released: March 13, 2019

Professional ratings
Review scores
Source	Rating
Exclaim!	6/10
Metal Hammer	6/7

The Shadow Theory is the twelfth studio album by American power metal band Kamelot. The album is produced by Sascha Paeth and was released on April 6, 2018. Guests on the album include Lauren Hart and Jennifer Haben.

It is the only studio album to feature Johan Nunez, replacing longtime member Casey Grillo on drums, who had departed from the band on February 5, 2018, to pursue other musical and touring opportunities and to focus on his drumhead company.

== Track listing ==
All tracks are written by Oliver Palotai, Sascha Paeth, Thomas Youngblood and Tommy Karevik, with "The Last Day of Sunlight" co-written by Bob Katsionis.

No.	Title	Length
1.	"The Mission"	1:30
2.	"Phantom Divine (Shadow Empire)" (featuring Lauren Hart)	4:05
3.	"RavenLight"	3:38
4.	"Amnesiac"	3:40
5.	"Burns to Embrace"	5:53
6.	"In Twilight Hours" (featuring Jennifer Haben)	4:15
7.	"Kevlar Skin"	4:05
8.	"Static"	3:58
9.	"MindFall Remedy" (featuring Lauren Hart)	3:22
10.	"Stories Unheard"	4:24
11.	"Vespertine (My Crimson Bride)"	3:58
12.	"The Proud and the Broken"	6:24
13.	"Ministrium (Shadow Key)"	3:02
Total length:		52:13

Japanese edition bonus track
No.	Title	Length
14.	"Angel of Refraction" (instrumental)	4:23

Bonus CD (Digipak edition)
No.	Title	Length
1.	"Phantom Divine (Shadow Empire)" (instrumental version)	4:07
2.	"RavenLight" (instrumental version)	3:38
3.	"Amnesiac" (instrumental version)	3:38
4.	"Burns to Embrace" (instrumental version)	5:53
5.	"Kevlar Skin" (instrumental version)	4:05
6.	"The Proud and the Broken" (instrumental version)	6:25
7.	"The Last Day of Sunlight" (bonus track)	4:20

== Personnel ==
All information from the album booklet.

Kamelot

- Tommy Karevik – vocals
- Thomas Youngblood – guitars
- Sean Tibbetts – bass
- Oliver Palotai – keyboards
- Johan Nunez – drums, percussion

Guest musicians

- Lauren Hart – guest vocals and growls on "Phantom Divine (Shadow Empire)" and growls on "MindFall Remedy"
- Jennifer Haben – guest vocals on "In Twilight Hours"

Choir

- Oliver Hartmann, Herbie Langhans, Cloudy Yang, Annie Berens, Nadine Ruch, Evelyn Mank, Thomas Dalton Youngblood

Crew

- Sascha Paeth – production, mixing, engineering, additional guitars and keys, and growls on "The Proud and the Broken"
- Thomas Youngblood – engineering, editing
- Oliver Palotai – orchestral arrangements, engineering, editing
- Jacob Hansen – mastering
- Stefan Heilemann – artwork
- Arne Wiegand – engineering, editing
- Miro Rodenberg – engineering, editing
- Olaf Reitmeier – engineering, editing
- Logan Mader – engineering, editing
- Tim Tronckoe – photography

== Charts ==
Chart (2018)	Peak position
Austrian Albums (Ö3 Austria)	30
Belgian Albums (Ultratop Flanders)	50
Belgian Albums (Ultratop Wallonia)	60
Dutch Albums (Album Top 100)	60
Finnish Albums (Suomen virallinen lista)	24
German Albums (Offizielle Top 100)	13
Hungarian Albums (MAHASZ)	27
Spanish Albums (Promusicae)	74
Swedish Albums (Sverigetopplistan)	55
Swiss Albums (Schweizer Hitparade)	13
US Billboard 200	141
US Top Hard Rock Albums (Billboard)	7
US Top Rock Albums (Billboard)	26
