= Eternity (Kamelot album) =

1995 studio album by Kamelot

Studio album by Kamelot
- Released: 1995
- Recorded: 1995
- Studio: Morrisound Studios, Tampa, Florida
- Genre: Symphonic power metal
- Length: 51:24
- Label: Noise
- Producer: Jim Morris, Kamelot

Kamelot chronology
Eternity (1995)	Dominion (1997)

Professional ratings
Review scores
Source	Rating
RevelationZ Magazine	5/10

Eternity is the debut studio album by American power metal band Kamelot, released in 1995. The album was remastered along with Dominion and Siége Perilous as part of the Ascension (1995–1998) box set, released on September 19, 2025. A lyric video for the remastered version of the title track came with the announcement.

== Track listing ==
All lyrics are written by Richard Warner; all music is composed by Thomas Youngblood.

No.	Title	Length
1.	"Eternity"	5:41
2.	"Black Tower"	4:06
3.	"Call of the Sea"	5:15
4.	"Proud Nomad"	4:52
5.	"Red Sands"	4:09
6.	"One of the Hunted"	5:26
7.	"Fire Within"	4:54
8.	"Warbird"	5:22
9.	"What About Me"	4:20
10.	"Étude jongleur" (Instrumental)	0:50
11.	"The Gleeman"	6:19

== Personnel ==
All information from the album booklet.

Kamelot

- Mark Vanderbilt – lead vocals
- Thomas Youngblood – guitars, backing vocals
- David Pavlicko – keyboards
- Glenn Barry – bass guitar
- Richard Warner – drums

Additional musicians

- Todd Plant – backing vocals
- Leroy Meyers – backing vocals
- Howard Helm – additional keyboards

Production

- Jim Morris – producer, engineering
- Dave Wehner – assistant engineer
- Steve Heritage – assistant engineer
- Jeff MacDonald – assistant engineer
- Buni Zubaly – photography
- Chrissy Orsini – clothing
- Rachel Youngblood – design, illustration
