= The Awakening (Kamelot album) =

2023 studio album by Kamelot

Studio album by Kamelot
- Released: March 17, 2023
- Genres: Symphonic metal; progressive metal; power metal
- Length: 52:51
- Label: Napalm
- Producers: Sascha Paeth; Kamelot

Kamelot chronology
The Shadow Theory (2018)	The Awakening (2023)	Dark Asylum (2026)

Singles from The Awakening
- 1. "One More Flag in the Ground" Released: January 12, 2023; 2. "Opus of the Night (Ghost Requiem)" Released: February 14, 2023; 3. "Eventide" Released: March 15, 2023; 4. "New Babylon" Released: May 23, 2023; 5. "NightSky" Released: March 18, 2024

Professional ratings
Review scores
Source	Rating
Blabbermouth.net	8/10
Metal Hammer	5/7 stars
New Noise	4/5 stars

The Awakening is the thirteenth studio album by American power metal band Kamelot. The album was released on March 17, 2023, via Napalm Records. It is the band's first studio album in five years, following 2018's The Shadow Theory, making this the longest gap between two studio albums by Kamelot.

It is the first studio album to feature Alex Landenburg on drums following the departure of Johan Nunez.

== Background ==
Following the tour for The Shadow Theory, Youngblood revealed in June 2020 that he, Karevik and Palotai were working on new material for the upcoming thirteenth Kamelot album.

Youngblood also revealed that a number of twenty-five songs had been written for the new album, focusing on only thirteen of them. Although the album was supposed to be released in March 2020, both Youngblood and Karevik had also stated that the band planned to release the new album in August or September 2021. Youngblood confirmed the number of twelve songs for the album and that the band were going to the studio to record their thirteenth studio album, as well as confirmed that the album will contain a mixture of both old and new elements and influences.

Kamelot announced that they had produced two music videos for the album in May 2022, following the 2021 deadline being passed. In the following month, the band finished the mixing for the album, later planning its release for an early 2023 release. Cellist Tina Guo was later announced that she would be a featured guest on the album.

== Track listing ==
All tracks are written by Karevik, Youngblood, Palotai and Paeth, with "The Great Divide" co-written by Jani Liimatainen.

The Awakening track listing
No.	Title	Length
1.	"Overture" (intro)	1:18
2.	"The Great Divide"	4:08
3.	"Eventide"	4:15
4.	"One More Flag in the Ground"	4:08
5.	"Opus of the Night (Ghost Requiem)"	5:48
6.	"Midsummer's Eve"	4:28
7.	"Bloodmoon"	4:51
8.	"NightSky"	3:24
9.	"The Looking Glass"	4:51
10.	"New Babylon" (featuring Simone Simons and Melissa Bonny)	4:19
11.	"Willow"	3:51
12.	"My Pantheon (Forevermore)"	4:34
13.	"Ephemera" (outro)	2:56
Total length:		52:51

Japanese edition bonus track
No.	Title	Length
14.	"Call of the Void"	3:42
Total length:		56:33

== Personnel ==
All information from the album booklet.

Kamelot

- Tommy Karevik – lead vocals
- Thomas Youngblood – guitars
- Sean Tibbetts – bass
- Oliver Palotai – keyboards, backing vocals
- Alex Landenburg – drums, percussion

Additional personnel

- Michael Rodenberg – additional keyboards, arrangements on "Midsummer's Eve"
- Kobra Paige – additional vocals on "One More Flag in the Ground"
- Brian Howes – backing vocals on "One More Flag in the Ground"
- Tina Guo – cello (tracks 5 and 6)
- Florian Janoske – violin on "Midsummer's Eve"
- Simone Simons – guest vocals on "New Babylon"
- Melissa Bonny – guest vocals on "New Babylon"
- Oliver Hartmann – backing vocals
- Herbie Langhans – backing vocals
- Ina Morgan – backing vocals

New Babylon Choir

- Chris Fenske
- Svenja Kehder

Crew

- Jacob Hansen – mixing, mastering
- Sascha Paeth – production, engineering, additional guitars, vocals
- Giannis Nakos – artwork
- Karl Dicaire – engineering
- Phil Hillen – engineering
- Tommy Karevik – engineering
- Oliver Palotai – engineering

== Charts ==
Chart performance for The Awakening
Chart (2023)	Peak position
Austrian Albums (Ö3 Austria)	31
Canadian Current Albums (Billboard)	11
Canadian Current Digital Albums (Billboard)	13
Canadian Hard Music Albums (Billboard)	2
Canadian Hard Rock Albums(Billboard)	35
Belgian Albums (Ultratop Flanders)	85
Dutch Albums (Album Top 100)	94
German Albums (Offizielle Top 100)	9
Japanese Hot Albums (Billboard Japan)	54
Scottish Albums (Official Charts)	68
Swiss Albums (Schweizer Hitparade)	15
UK Albums (OCC)	27
UK Physical Albums (OCC)	28
UK Album Downloads (Official Charts)	30
UK Rock & Metal Albums (Official Charts)	4
UK Independent Albums (Official Charts)	11
UK Independent Breakers (OCC)	3
US Current Albums (Billboard)	27
US Current Digital Albums (Billboard)	17
US Current Hard Music Albums (Billboard)	2
US Current Hard Rock Albums (Billboard)	2
US Current Rock Albums (Billboard)	11
US Record Label Independent Current Albums (Billboard)	7
