= Dominion (Kamelot album) =

1997 studio album by Kamelot

Studio album by Kamelot
- Released: 1997
- Recorded: 1996
- Studio: Morrisound Studios, Tampa, Florida
- Genre: Symphonic power metal
- Length: 46:38
- Label: Noise
- Producer: Jim Morris

Kamelot chronology
Eternity (1995)	Dominion (1997)	Siége Perilous (1998)

Professional ratings
Review scores
Source	Rating
RevelationZ Magazine	5.5/10

Dominion is the second studio album by American power metal band Kamelot, released in 1997. It was the last album to feature original vocalist Mark Vanderbilt and founding drummer Richard Warner. The album was re-released by Sanctuary Records in 2007, and again on September 19, 2025, remastered along with Eternity and Siége Perilous as part of the Ascension (1995–1998) box set that was named after this album's intro track.

== Track listing ==
All tracks are written by Richard Warner and Thomas Youngblood, except where noted.

No.	Title	Writer(s)	Length
1.	"Ascension" (Instrumental)	David Pavlicko, Youngblood	1:25
2.	"Heaven"		3:39
3.	"Rise Again"		4:06
4.	"One Day I'll Win"		5:39
5.	"We Are Not Separate"		3:45
6.	"Birth of a Hero"		5:17
7.	"Creation" (Instrumental)	Glenn Barry, Youngblood	5:06
8.	"Sin"		3:35
9.	"Song of Roland"		4:54
10.	"Crossing Two Rivers"		4:29
11.	"Troubled Mind"	Pavlicko, Warner, Youngblood	4:39

== Personnel ==
All information from the album booklet.

Kamelot

- Mark Vanderbilt – lead vocals
- Thomas Youngblood – guitars, backing vocals
- David Pavlicko – keyboards
- Glenn Barry – bass guitar
- Richard Warner – drums

Production

- Jim Morris – production, engineer
- Dave Wehner – assistant engineer
- Brian Benscoter – assistant engineer
- Steve Heritage – assistant engineer
- Buni Zubaly – photography
- Derek Gores – artwork, design
- Rachel Youngblood – graphic consultation
