= The Black Halo =

2005 studio album by Kamelot

Studio album by Kamelot
- Released: March 15, 2005
- Recorded: June–October 2004
- Studios: Gate Studios (Wolfsburg); Above the C Studios (Tampa)
- Genres: Power metal; symphonic metal; heavy metal; progressive metal
- Length: 57:21
- Label: SPV/Steamhammer
- Producers: Sascha Paeth, Miro, Roy Khan, Thomas Youngblood

Kamelot chronology
Epica (2003)	The Black Halo (2005)	Ghost Opera (2007)

Singles from The Black Halo
- 1. "The Haunting (Somewhere in Time)" Released: March 15, 2005; 2. "March of Mephisto" Released: April 4, 2005; 3. "Soul Society" Released: April 7, 2006

Professional ratings
Review scores
Source	Rating
AllMusic	4.5/5 stars
Last Rites	10/10 stars
Metal Storm	9.7/10 stars

The Black Halo is the seventh studio album by American power metal band Kamelot. It was released on March 15, 2005, through Steamhammer Records. It is a concept album inspired by Goethe's Faust. Continuing the story introduced in Epica (2003), it is the second and final record in Kamelot's two-part rock opera about Ariel (a character based on Heinrich Faust). Epica tells Part 1 while The Black Halo tells Part 2. Goethe's Faust is also broken into two parts. The Black Halo features guest appearances by Simone Simons (Epica), Shagrath (Dimmu Borgir), Jens Johansson (Stratovarius), and several others. The album was released on vinyl in the spring of 2009, along with Ghost Opera (2007). Regarded as the band's magnum opus, in 2026, Loudwire ranked it as the third greatest progressive power metal album of all time. Likewise, it has been often ranked as one of the greatest albums of the progressive and power metal genres.

== Characters ==
- Ariel (Roy Khan) – Ariel is a curious, determined, and arrogant man. An unparalleled genius and an accomplished scientist and philosopher, he has become disappointed with the inability of these disciplines to answer his deepest questions and seeks to uncover the universal truth that they have failed to provide. He strongly believes that discovering such transcendent knowledge is the only thing that can make his life worthwhile. In Epica, Ariel's quest for this truth led him to make a binding deal with Mephisto, under which Mephisto would supply him with worldly power and knowledge. In exchange, if Ariel ever experiences a moment in which he is so content that he wishes to linger there forever, his soul will belong to Mephisto. After a reunion with Helena, Ariel left her to continue his quest, driving her to commit suicide. Ariel is based on the character Heinrich Faust from Goethe's Faust.
- Helena (Mari) – Helena grew up with Ariel, and loves him deeply. She is the only person that Ariel has ever truly loved. She represents innocence and all that is pure and good. In Epica, after Ariel left to embark on his quest for ultimate knowledge, she went in search of him, and eventually found him. Though they stayed together for a time, Ariel left her to continue his quest. Helena, distraught at this, killed herself. Now in Heaven, she is watching over Ariel. Helena is based on Gretchen from Goethe's Faust.
- Mephisto (Shagrath) – Mephisto is a rebellious angel who was cast out of Heaven. He desperately yearns to reenter Heaven and be reunited with God. He deeply disdains humans, whom he considers inferior beings unworthy of God's love. In Epica, Mephisto made a bet with God that he could claim the soul of Ariel, God's favorite man. If Mephisto wins his bet, he can re-enter Heaven, but if he loses, he will be condemned to Hell for eternity. Mephisto manipulated Ariel into a contract whereby Mephisto would provide Ariel with worldly power and knowledge, and in exchange, if Ariel ever experiences a moment of such deep contentment that he wishes to linger there forever, his soul would belong to Mephisto. Mephisto is the only character whose name was left as it was in the original Faust story.
- Marguerite (Simone Simons) – A young woman living in the Town (in which Epica ends and The Black Halo begins), Marguerite's voice and appearance are similar to Helena's. Her character was inspired by the appearance of Helen of Troy in Goethe's Faust, but she is named after Gretchen from Goethe's Faust, "Gretchen" being a nickname for Margaret or Marguerite.

== Plot ==
Continuing from Epica, Ariel is still stricken with grief and sorrow over Helena's death. (March of Mephisto) With Ariel's will nearly under Mephisto's total control, the fallen angel brings Ariel a beautiful young woman named Marguerite, who looks and speaks like Helena. Ariel seduces Marguerite and the two sleep together, which completes Mephisto's manipulation of Ariel. (When the Lights are Down) The morning after, Ariel regains his memory, breaking Mephisto's control over him, and comes to his senses. He apologizes to Marguerite and explains his story, begging her to leave, but saying that they might meet again someday. (The Haunting (Somewhere in Time)) Ariel leaves Mephisto, and wonders how all the pain he has caused could come about as a result of his good intentions in searching for the answers to the meaning of life. (Soul Society) He concludes that it is impossible to find these answers on Earth and that they must lie in heaven alone. (Interlude I: Dei Gratia) Realizing that his sins have prevented him from entering heaven, he begs God for forgiveness but hears no sign from Him. (Abandoned) Heartbroken, he realizes that he will never be able to reunite with Helena, nor find the answers he seeks. He looks back on the suffering that he has caused to everyone he knows and concludes that it can never be undone. (This Pain)

With this, Ariel prompts himself into action and decides to confront Mephisto. He crosses the river and approaches Mephisto's castle. (Moonlight) Resigning himself to death, he approaches Mephisto. (Interlude II: Un Assassinio Molto Silenzioso) Ariel denounces him as traitorous and evil. He cuts his ties to Mephisto, and resolves to live a good life like Helena did, even though his sins have damned his soul to hell anyway. (The Black Halo) Ariel states that humanity will always struggle with the very questions that Ariel has been trying to answer throughout his journey. This prompts him to a sudden realization: that love is the ultimate answer to life, and that the true love between himself and Helena was thus a part of it, even before he left on his quest. He knows now that, even having found his answer, he will never be truly satisfied, and that his free will allows him to create his own meaning of life and his own destiny. With his questions finally answered, he comes to a state of transcendental understanding and sublime joy, so strong that he wishes to linger at that moment forever. (Nothing Ever Dies)

This moment of total satisfaction brings into effect the contract that Ariel made with Mephisto, and thus his soul now belongs to the fallen angel. As Ariel's soul begins to leave his body, Mephisto prepares to claim it. However, Helena intercedes to God on Ariel's behalf. Since Ariel has rejected all evil, even in the face of certain damnation, he has redeemed himself, and God allows him to enter heaven with Helena. Mephisto, his bet with God lost, wails as he is cast into hell forever. (Memento Mori)

With the story over, it is revealed that Ariel's tale is a playset for a New Year's Eve festival, similar to the framing device of Goethe's Faust. (Interlude III: Midnight – Twelve Tolls for a New Day) The festival ends with a tribute to tragedy, comedy, and the cyclical nature of life. (Serenade)

== Track listing ==
All tracks are written by Kamelot.

No.	Title	Length
1.	"March of Mephisto" (featuring Shagrath)	5:28
2.	"When the Lights Are Down"	3:41
3.	"The Haunting (Somewhere in Time)" (featuring Simone Simons)	5:40
4.	"Soul Society"	4:17
5.	"Interlude I: Dei Gratia"	0:57
6.	"Abandoned" (featuring Mari Youngblood)	4:07
7.	"This Pain"	3:59
8.	"Moonlight"	5:10
9.	"Interlude II: Un Assassinio Molto Silenzioso"	0:40
10.	"The Black Halo"	3:43
11.	"Nothing Ever Dies"	4:45
12.	"Memento Mori" (featuring Shagrath & Mari Youngblood)	8:54
13.	"Interlude III: Midnight - Twelve Tolls for a New Day"	1:21
14.	"Serenade"	4:32
Total length:		58:41

Limited edition bonus tracks
No.	Title	Length
15.	"The Haunting (Somewhere in Time)" (feat. Simone Simons, radio edit)	3:42
16.	"March of Mephisto" (feat. Shagrath, radio edit)	3:31

Japanese bonus tracks
No.	Title	Length
15.	"Epilogue"	2:46
16.	"Soul Society" (radio edit)	3:52

== Charts ==
Chart (2005)	Peak position
Belgian Albums Chart	81
Finnish Albums Chart	50
French Albums Chart	101
German Albums Chart	81
Japanese Albums Chart	41
Norwegian Albums Chart	87
Swedish Albums Chart	24

== Personnel ==
Credits for The Black Halo adapted from liner notes.

Kamelot

- Roy Khan – vocals
- Thomas Youngblood – guitars
- Glenn Barry – bass
- Casey Grillo – drums, percussion

Additional personnel

- Miro – keyboards, orchestral arrangements
- Sascha Paeth – additional guitars
- Jens Johansson – keyboard solos on "March of Mephisto" and "When the Lights Are Down"
- Shagrath – Mephisto character on "March of Mephisto" and "Memento Mori"
- Cinzia Rizzo – cabaret singer on "Un Assassinio Molto Silenzioso"
- Simone Simons – Marguerite character on "The Haunting"
- Geoff Rudd – The Usher at the Theater (pre-gap track) and Mayor of Gatesville (track 13)
- Mari Youngblood – Helena character on "Memento Mori" and "Abandoned"
- Annelise Youngblood – Baby Alena on "Soul Society"
- Andre Neygenfind – D-bass on "Abandoned"
- Wolfgang Dietrich – oboe on "Memento Mori"
- Rodenberg Symphony Orchestra – orchestrations

Choir

- Herbie Langhans, Amanda Somerville, Michael Rodenberg, Gerit Göbel, Thomas Rettke and Elisabeth Kjærnes

Production

- Sascha Paeth – producer, mixing, mastering, engineering
- Miro – producer, engineering
- Olaf Reitmeier - mixing
- Michael Tibes – mastering
- Philip Colodetti – mastering
- Derek "Dodge" Gores – cover art
