= Siége Perilous =

1998 studio album by Kamelot

Studio album by Kamelot
- Released: August 4, 1998
- Recorded: January–March 1998
- Studio: Morrisound Studios, Tampa, Florida
- Genre: Symphonic power metal
- Length: 50:37
- Label: Noise
- Producer: Thomas Youngblood; Kamelot

Kamelot chronology
Dominion (1997)	Siége Perilous (1998)	The Fourth Legacy (1999)

Professional ratings
Review scores
Source	Rating
AllMusic	3/5 stars
RevelationZ Magazine	6.5/10

Siége Perilous is the third studio album by American power metal band Kamelot. It was released on August 4, 1998, through Noise Records. It is the first album with Roy Khan on vocals and Casey Grillo on drums, and is the final album to feature David Pavlicko on keyboards.

In Arthurian legend, the Siege Perilous, otherwise known as "The Seat Perilous", is the seat at the Round Table reserved for the knight who would quest for and return the Holy Grail.

The album was remastered along with Eternity and Dominion as part of the Ascension (1995–1998) box set, released on September 19, 2025.

== Track listing ==
Siége Perilous track listing
No.	Title	Writer(s)	Length
1.	"Providence"	David Pavlicko	5:35
2.	"Millennium"	Roy Khan	5:15
3.	"King's Eyes"	Glenn Barry; Thomas Youngblood	6:14
4.	"Expedition"	Glenn Barry; Thomas Youngblood	5:41
5.	"Where I Reign"	David Pavlicko	5:58
6.	"Rhydin"	Thomas Youngblood	5:03
7.	"Parting Visions"	Roy Khan; Thomas Youngblood	3:34
8.	"Once a Dream"	Thomas Youngblood	4:24
9.	"Irea"	Roy Khan	4:32
10.	"Siege" (Instrumental)		4:21
Total length:			50:37

Japanese edition bonus track
No.	Title	Length
11.	"One Day"	4:10
Total length:		54:47

2025 remaster bonus tracks
No.	Title	Length
11.	"We Three Kings"	4:45
12.	"One Day"	4:10
13.	"Look Through These King's Eyes" (King's Eyes Demo)	6:25
14.	"Millennium" (Instrumental Demo)	5:04
15.	"Eternal Flame" (Once a Dream Demo)	4:52
Total length:		75:53

=== Notes ===
- The track listing on the back cover of the CD is incorrect. "Rhydin" is track 6, while "Parting Visions" and "Once a Dream" are shifted down once each. The track listing shown here is the correct version, which is listed in the liner notes.
- The title of track 6 is a reference to the fantasy role-playing world, RhyDin.

== Personnel ==
All information from the album booklet.

Kamelot

- Roy Khan – lead vocals
- Thomas Youngblood – guitars, backing vocals, producer
- David Pavlicko – keyboards
- Glenn Barry – bass guitar
- Casey Grillo – drums

Additional musician

- Tore Østby – acoustic guitar on "Siege"

Production

- Tommy Newton – mixing
- Mark Prator – engineer
- Jim Morris – engineer
- Tom Morris – engineer
- Derek Gores – cover art
- Rachel Youngblood – graphic production, design
- Kim Grillo – photography
