= Fräulein Wunder =

German pop rock band

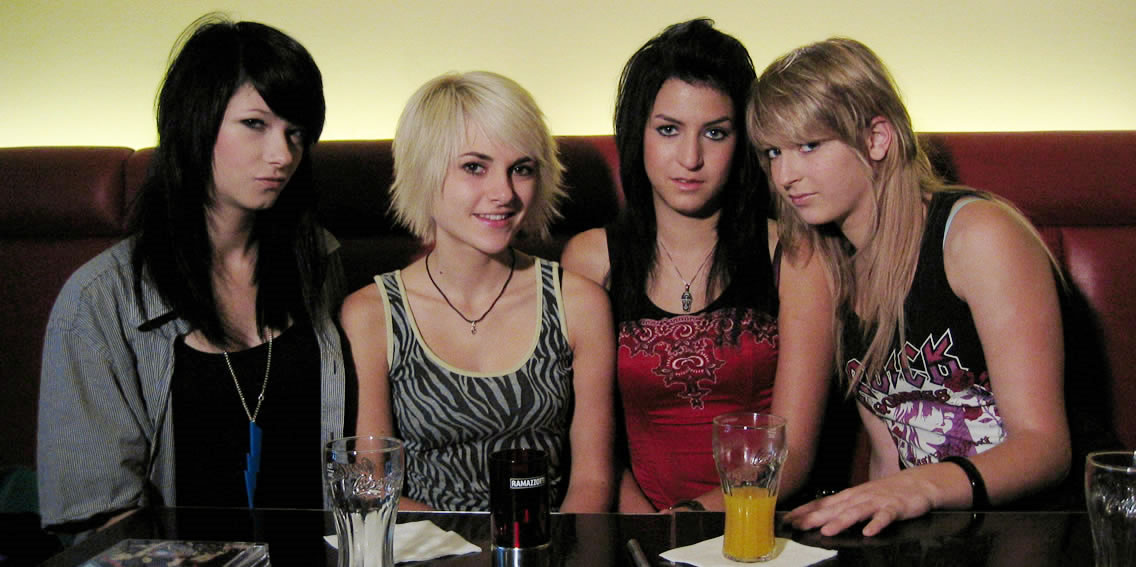
- Left to right: Chanty, Kerstin, Pia, Steffy

Background information
- Origin: Hesse, Germany
- Genres: Pop punk, pop rock
- Years active: 2006–2010
- Labels: Universal, Vertigo
- Members: Chanty; Kerstin; Steffy; Pia

Fräulein Wunder (German for "Miss Miracle") was a German pop rock band from Friedberg, Hesse.

== Band history ==
The four band members regularly met in 2006 at one of the member's hobby cellar to play cover songs of their favorite bands. In 2007, they wrote their first songs, and later, followed up with their first appearances. Initially, the group formed under the name Puppenblut (literally 'doll blood'), but they briefly took the name sHERO until 2008. In one of their concerts, they were discovered by a label. The band shortly thereafter published their first album on August 29, 2008. They quickly followed up with their first single, Wenn ich ein Junge wär, which made it to number 16 in the German single charts. In August and July 2008, the band aired several "band diaries" on Viva. In 2009, the band represented Hesse in the Bundesvision Song Contest and reached sixth place with their song Sternradio.

In May 2011, Steffy revealed in an interview with Burning-Music.de that the band had broken up. She now plays bass for the Berlin pop-rock band SuperCircus.

== Members ==
- Vocals: Chanty Wunder a.k.a. Jana Chantal Franziska Loch (born 29 October 1990)
- Guitar: Kerstin Wunder a.k.a. Kerstin Klein (born 24 November 1990)
- Bass: Steffy Wunder a.k.a. Stefanie Spänkuch (born 15 August 1989)
- Drums: Pia Wunder a.k.a. Pia Gottwals (born 15 May 1991)

== Discography ==
=== Albums ===
- Fräulein Wunder (2008) (DE: #40, AT: #33)

=== Singles ===
- Wenn ich ein Junge wär ("If I were a boy", 2008) (DE: #16, AT: #41, LT: #7)
- Mein Herz ist Gift für dich ("My heart is poison for you", 2008) (DE: #79)
- Sternradio ("Starradio", 2009) (DE: #55)
