= Robert Hunecke-Rizzo =

German musician

Robert Hunecke-Rizzo (17 June 1971, Wolfsburg) is a German bassist, guitarist and drummer, known for his work with Heavens Gate, Luca Turilli, and Kamelot.

He was one of the founding members of the supergroup Aina, which released the metal opera Days of Rising Doom in 2003. He was the music composer and played most of the instruments on the album. He was also a touring member as bass player of the metal opera project Avantasia, and his performance was thereby recorded on the band's live DVD The Flying Opera released in 2011. He was part of the Avantasia world tours in 2008 and 2010.
