= Common Ground Festival =

Punk rock festival held in the United Kingdom

- Genre: Punk rock, anarcho-punk, hardcore punk, dub
- Dates: September
- Location: United Kingdom
- Years active: 2004–present
- Founders: Dave Cox
- Organiser: Pumpkin Records
- Website: www.commongroundfest.com

Common Ground Festival was originally called "The Dirty Weekend" (until 2016) and is a not-for-profit punk rock festival held in the United Kingdom every September since 2004. Profits go to various grass roots charities focusing on political activism, animal rights, and other causes. It is generally dominated by anarcho-punk, crust punk, and hardcore punk bands but also features dub, ska punk, and folk punk acts.

== History ==
The festival emerged as The Dirty Weekend in Rhyl, Wales in 2004. Originally a one-day event, the festival soon became a 2-day festival, moving from venue to venue around North Wales until managing to find a more permanent location in Wrexham in 2011 for three years, until the festival was cut short by an electrical fault caused a fire at the venue. Changing its name to Common Ground, it still struggled to find a suitable home and relocated every year.

== 2004 ==
Having put regular gigs on in Rhyl, Dave Cox, Steve Brute and Leigh Cox (all of punk band The Cox), organised the first Dirty Weekend festival at The Morville Hotel in the town on 6 & 7 August 2004. Bands included on the line-up were Drongos For Europe, Red Flag 77, Instant Agony and Stuntface.

== 2005 ==
Moving to the smaller confines of The Dudley Arms, Rhyl, the second festival was held over the weekend of 6 August 2005. The line-up included; Drongos For Europe, The Nerds and 3 Minute Warning.

== 2006 ==
At The Dudley Arms, Rhyl

== 2007 ==
At The Dudley Arms, Rhyl, over the weekend of 2 June 2007. Bands included The Restarts, Riot Squad, Stuntface, 3 Minute Warning.

== 2008 ==
This time over the weekend of 20 September 2008, the festival had found a new venue at Hendre Hall, near Bangor, Gwynedd. The line-up included 'bigger' names on the punk scene such as Discharge, Subhumans and Inner Terrestrials.

== 2012 ==
The festival, after a four-year hiatus emerged across two venues in Wrexham on 7 & 8 September, announced proceeds would be donated to animal charities including, Greyhound Rescue Wales. Event organisers included Elliot Capper, Dave Cox, Hannah Pickup and Pumpkin Records (who also hosted one of the stages). The line-up included; Inner Terrestrials (who pulled out), Roughneck Riot, The Tear Up, Global Parasite, Vice Squad, Neville Staple and Doom.

== 2013 ==
Again held in Wrexham, The Dirty Weekend festival was cut short when a small fire fused the electric supply, preventing headliners Extreme Noise Terror from finishing their set as the venue filled with smoke. Other bands on the bill that year included, Oi Polloi, Concrete Sox, Citizen Fish and Emissaries Of Syn.

== 2014 ==
In 2014 a new home was found for the festival at the workhouse in Llanfyllin, however, even before the festival occurred, local residents were up in arms due to the controversial nature of some of the bands booked to play there. The festival went ahead with no problems but under pressure from the council and local MP, the venue wasn't able to allow the festival to go on the following year.

== 2015 ==
This year saw the Dirty Weekend festival move to yet another new location to the south of Chester, an area called Chester Lakes that had a campsite. Larger crowds of approximately 500 people attended over the weekend of 4-5-6 September, but again had problems, this time due to noise complaints from local residents. Ahead of the event Pumpkin Records released a download compilation of bands appearing on the bill, including, Hellbastard, Deviated Instinct, Spam Javelin, The Mob

== 2016 ==
On 26 January 2016 it was announced festival was to move south (far from its early roots in North Wales), to a location near the Forest of Dean under the new name of 'Common Ground Festival'. The event managed to raise over £900 for their supported charities and took place on 2-3-4 September. The line-up included; Doom, Louise Distras and Cress

== 2017 ==
Still moving south, this year's Common Ground festival was held at The Black Swan in Bristol on 1-2-3 September 2017. Bands included were; Omega Tribe, Pizzatramp, Skaciety, Warwound, and The Stupids. The event ran at a loss of £2302. A 37 track download compilation album "Common Ground 2017" was released on 21 August 2017 in aid of charities supported by the festival organisers. A series of benefit gigs took place during late 2017 and into 2018 to raise funds for the organisers (who were by now Matt of Pumpkin Records and Elliot Capper), and they asked for help looking for a new venue.

== 2018 ==
On 16 March 2018, the Common Ground Facebook page announced there would be no festival this year being unable to locate a suitable venue.

== Notable previous acts ==
- Extreme Noise Terror
- Oi Polloi
- Inner Terrestrials
- Neville Staple
- The Restarts
- Culture Shock
- Antisect
- Radical Dance Faction
- Police Bastard
- Hellbastard
- The Mob
- Anti-System
- Concrete Sox

== See also ==
- List of punk rock festivals
- List of music festivals in the United Kingdom
