= Inner Terrestrials =

- Origin: London, England
- Genres: ska punk, dub, punk
- Years active: 1994–present
- Members: Jay Terrestrial; Fran Webber; Ben Swan
- Past members: Paco Carreno
- Website: Official website

Inner Terrestrials (also referred to as iT!) is a British punk band from South London, England. Originally formed by Jay Terrestrial and Fran Webber, their first gig was in February 1994. Their music is a mix of punk, dub, ska and a touch of folk, with lyrics that are more often than not aggressively political and cover subjects such as anarchism, animal rights, land ownership, the class system, war, and many other subjects. Completely anti-establishment, they prefer to deal only with underground and DIY distributors (distros) and collectives, and as such became "legendary" (according to Peppermint Iguana, The Bolton News, and The South Wales Evening Post) in the underground punk and squatter scene in the UK and across Europe.

== Career ==
Originally formed by Jay Terrestrial and Fran Webber, their first gig was at the Queen Adelaide Pub in Penge, South London on 14 February 1994. The band has gigged every year since their beginnings, and by 2015, they had played thousands of gigs across the UK, Ireland, mainland Europe, Réunion Island, and Japan.

== Benefits ==
In 2009, the band played alongside the Fun Lovin' Criminals to raise funds for direct action against logging. In February 2015, the band played a fundraiser for victims of the Gaza–Israel conflict in Uplands, Swansea, Wales.

== Members ==
- Jay Terrestrial – vocals, guitar, whistle
- Fran Webber – vocals, bass
- Ben Swan – drums

At the start of 2014 Ben "The Boy Wonder" Swan joined the band.

=== Former ===
- Paco Carreno – drums (1996–2006, 2007–2013)

Paco Carreno (formerly of Conflict) came in on drums for the debut album in 1996. Paco stayed with the band until 2006 when he took a break for health reasons. Before he returned in 2007 Inner Terrestrials drumming was covered by Kevin (Headjam) and Michel (Six-8). In 2013 Paco's health again meant he could no longer continue, and Martin (Los Albertos) drummed for the band for the 2013 touring schedule. Paco died on 20 February 2015, at the age of 49.

== Discography ==
=== Albums ===
- iT! (1996)
- X (2004)
- Tales of Terror (2012)
- Heart of the Free (2021)

=== Live albums ===
- Escape from New Cross (1997)
- Live in Auxerre (DVD) (2003)
- Mud, Sweat and Beers (Live at Endorse-It) (DVD) (2008)

=== EP ===
- Enter The Dragon (1999)
- Guns of Brixton (2003)

=== Singles ===
- Barry Horne (2002)

=== Collaborations ===
- IT filmed a video of "The Toreador March" (Bizet) for actor Christopher Lee's 2006 operatic album Revelation.
- In 2005 Jay Terrestrial collaborated with members of The Filaments, Ex-cathedra, Sonic Boom Six, The King Blues (and many more acts) in forming the supergroup 'Suicide Bid). Suicide Bid released 'This is the generation' album on Household Name Records in 2005 and 'The Rot Stops here' on Maloka records in 2006.

== See also ==
- Punk ideology
