= Riot Squad =

Riot Squad may refer to:

- Police riot squad, see Riot control
- Riot Squad (band), an English punk rock band from Mansfield, England
- Riot Squad (1933 film), an American Pre-Code film
- Riot Squad (1941 film), an American crime film
- Riot Squad (comics), a supervillain team from Marvel Comics

== See also ==
- The Riot Squad, a pop group from London, England
