= Hedras Ramos =

Guatemalan guitarist

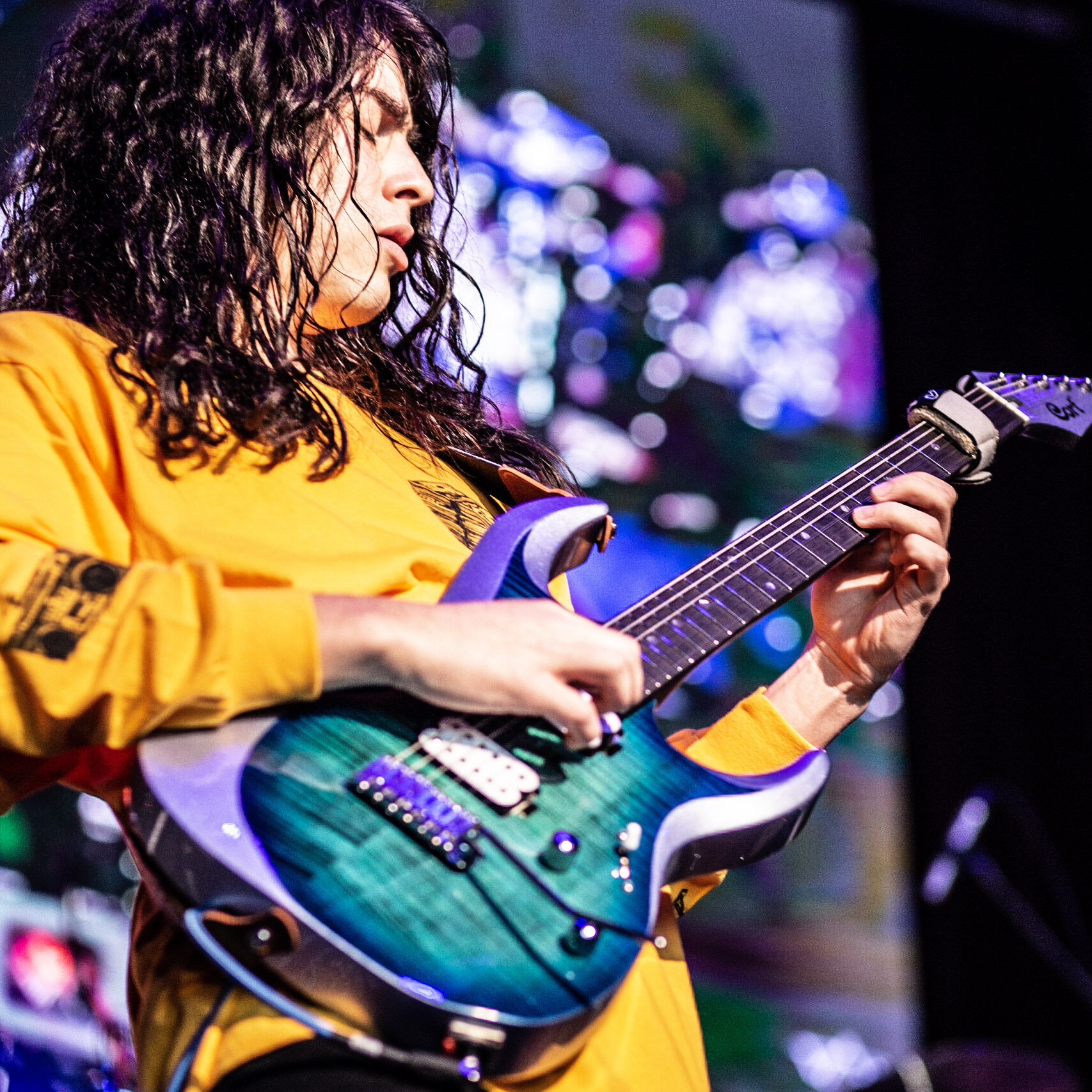

Background information
- Born: Hedras David Ramos Velasquez; February 3, 1992 (age 34); Guatemala City, Guatemala
- Genres: Progressive metal, heavy metal, hard rock, shred, instrumental rock, jazz fusion
- Occupations: Musician, guitarist
- Instruments: Guitar, bass, piano, drums
- Years active: 2005–present
- Website: hedrasmusic.com

Hedras David Ramos Velasquez (born February 3, 1992) is a Guatemalan multi-instrumentalist, specializing in guitar.

== Biography ==
=== Career ===
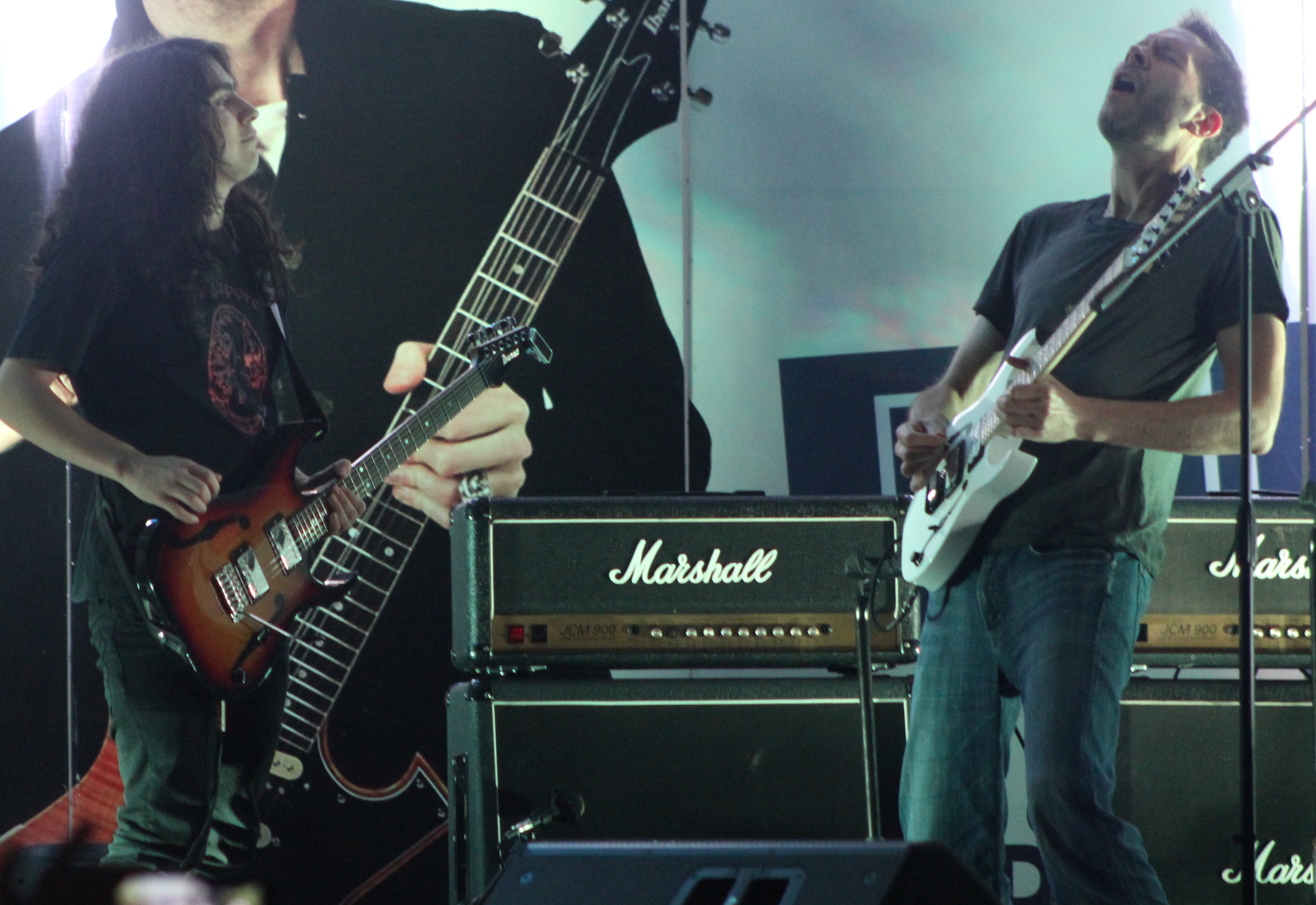
Hedras & Paul Gilbert

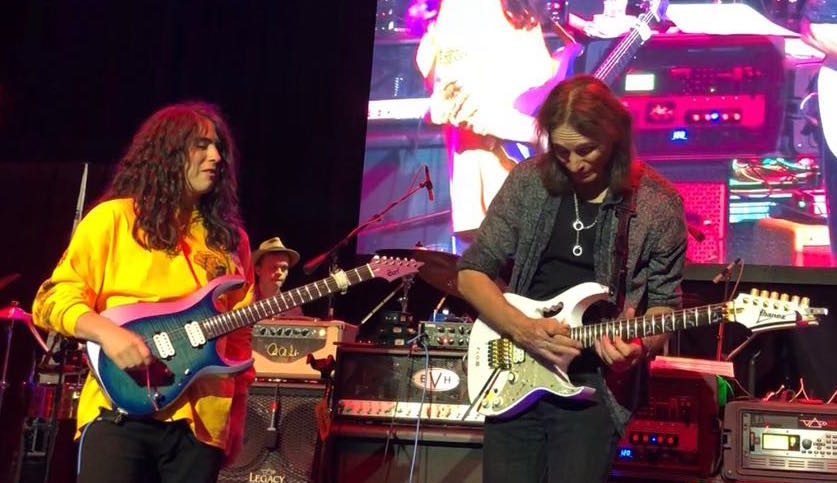
Hedras & Steve Vai

Hedras began his musical career at age six by learning to play the drums. It wasn't until 2005 however (at age 13) when Hedras became interested in learning guitar. He typically practiced 7 or more hours every day, even playing up to 12 hours a day during vacations from school.

Entirely self-taught, Hedras pushed himself hard to master the guitar and on December 15, 2009, by the time he was 16 years old, he had composed and produced his first instrumental album New Sounds. Following this release was his instrumental Christmas album The Holy Gift of Shred which became available for purchase in November 2009.

In 2016, Hedras played with guitarist Paul Gilbert in Guatemala city.

After moving to Los Angeles CA, In 2018 Hedras started giving many guitar clinics at prestigious Music School "Musicians Institute" which led to his participation at the Big Mama Jamathon where he performed with Steve Vai.

Hedras also opened a show for Guns N' Roses in Guatemala during their "Chinese Democracy" tour.

=== Endorsements ===
In February 2011, Rock Band released a new game featuring Ramos and the single "Insanity of the Atoms" from his third album Atoms and Space. On September 2 of that same year, Rock Band released another game featuring the single "Stellar Crash", also from Atoms and Space. Both games are currently available for Xbox 360 users and are not yet rated.

== Discography ==
- Atoms And Space (2011)
- Charlemagne: The Omens of Death (2013)
- The Impressionist (2017)
- Pagans (2020)
- Angels (2022)
