= Charlemagne: The Omens of Death =

Studio album by Christopher Lee
- Released: 27 May 2013
- Genre: Heavy metal; power metal
- Length: 52:53
- Label: Charlemagne Productions Ltd.

Christopher Lee chronology
Charlemagne: By the Sword and the Cross (2010)	Charlemagne: The Omens of Death (2013)	Metal Knight (2014)

Singles from Charlemagne: The Omens of Death
- 1. "Let Legend Mark Me as the King" Released: 27 May 2012

Charlemagne: The Omens of Death is the fourth and final album by the English actor and singer Christopher Lee. It was released on 27 May 2013. It is a sequel to his album Charlemagne: By the Sword and the Cross (2010). The music was arranged by Judas Priest's Richie Faulkner and features prominent Guatemalan guitar virtuoso Hedras Ramos, as well as his father, Hedras Ramos Sr., on bass.

On his 90th birthday (27 May 2012), Lee announced the release of the first single, "Let Legend Mark Me as the King", signifying his move onto "full on" heavy metal, after performing a more symphonic style on his prior releases. He was the oldest heavy metal performer in history. He was joined on the single by tenor Vincent Ricciardi, who also appeared on Charlemagne: By the Sword and the Cross.

== Track listing ==
No.	Title	Length
1.	"The Portent"	4:29
2.	"Charles the Great"	6:23
3.	"The Siege"	7:09
4.	"Massacre of the Saxons"	5:41
5.	"Dawning of a New Age"	4:40
6.	"Let Legend Mark Me as the King"	5:45
7.	"The Betrayal"	5:02
8.	"The Devil's Advocate"	4:54
9.	"The Ultimate Sacrifice"	5:09
10.	"Judgement Day"	3:41
Total length:		52:53

== Personnel ==
=== Singers ===
- Christopher Lee as Charlemagne (Ghost)
- Vincent Ricciardi as Young Charlemagne
- Phil S.P as Pippin the Short
- Mauro Conti as Pope Hadrian
- Lydia Salnikova as Hildegard
- Gordon Tittsworth as Roland
- Aaron Cloutier as Duke Lupo
- Daniel Vasconcelos as Oliver

=== Musicians ===
- Hedras Ramos Jr. – guitars, composition ("The Devil's Advocate", "The Ultimate Sacrifice")
- Hedras Ramos Sr. – bass guitar
- Ollie Usiskin – drums

=== Additional personnel ===
- Richie Faulkner – arrangements
- Marco Sabiu – composer
- Marie-Claire Calvet – lyricist
- John Wistow – composer, lyricist
