= Charlemagne: By the Sword and the Cross =

Studio album by Christopher Lee
- Released: 15 March 2010
- Genre: Symphonic metal; orchestral; spoken word
- Length: 62:21
- Label: Charlemagne Productions Ltd.
- Producer: J. Aneiros, C. Canonici

Christopher Lee chronology
Revelation (2006)	Charlemagne: By the Sword and the Cross (2010)	Charlemagne: The Omens of Death (2013)

Charlemagne: By the Sword and the Cross is a symphonic metal concept album by the English actor and singer Christopher Lee. It was released on 15 March 2010. This was Lee's first full-length album in the genre, having previously worked with such bands as Rhapsody of Fire and Manowar.

It tells the story of Charlemagne, the first Holy Roman Emperor, to whom Lee can trace his ancestry. Geneticists have pointed out however that virtually everyone of European ancestry is directly descended from Charlemagne, and Scott Hershberger writing for Scientific American stated that Lee’s enthusiasm for his link to Charlemagne “may have been a tad excessive”.

The album's promotional MySpace page garnered over 20 million hits from around the world. The album features two bands and a number of guest vocalists playing the different roles in the story. Music was composed by Marco Sabiu. A music video for "The Bloody Verdict of Verden" was released in June 2012. A heavy metal follow-up album, titled Charlemagne: The Omens of Death, was released in 2013.

== Track listing ==
All lyrics written by Marie-Claire Calvet, all music composed by Marco Sabiu.

1. "Overture" – 2:53
2. Act I:
  1. "Intro" – 1:34
  2. "King of the Franks" – 7:14
3. Act II:
  1. "Intro" – 1:46
  2. "The Iron Crown of Lombardy" – 8:12
4. Act III:
  1. "Intro" – 3:26
  2. "The Bloody Verdict of Verden" – 6:16
5. Act IV:
  1. "Intro" – 2:31
  2. "The Age of Oneness Out of Diversity" – 6:07
6. Act V:
  1. "Intro" – 2:09
  2. Starlight – 4:40
7. "Finale" – 3:57
8. "Iberia" – 5:10
9. "The Bloody Verdict of Verden" (Instrumental) – 6:20

== Personnel ==
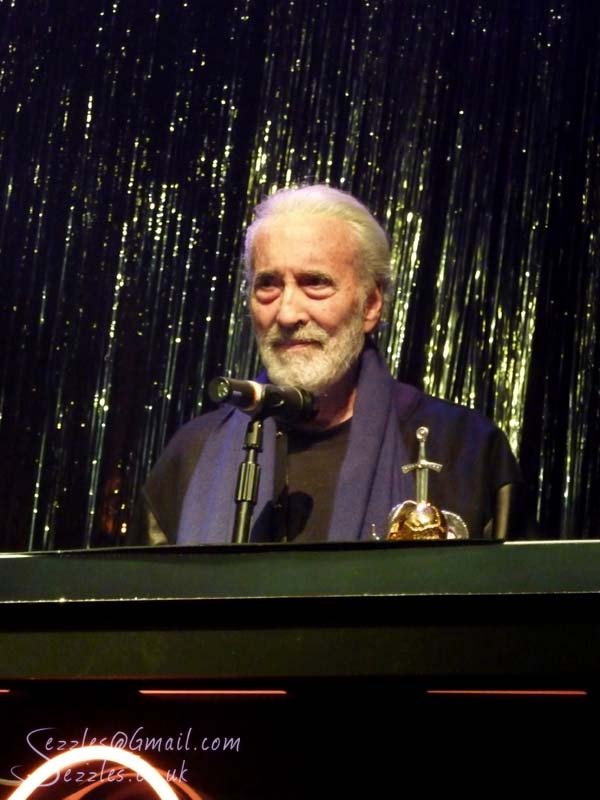
Christopher Lee receiving the "Spirit of Metal" award at the 2010 Metal Hammer Golden Gods awards ceremony

=== Vocals ===
- Christopher Lee – Charlemagne (Ghost)
- Vincent Ricciardi – Charlemagne (Young)
- Lydia Salnikova – Hildegard
- Christina Lee – narration
- Phil SP – Pepin the Short
- Mauro Conti – Pope Hadrian
- Christi Ebenhoch – storytelling singer
- Dave "Grav" Cavill – additional vocals
- John Wistow – backing vocals
- European Cinematic Symphony Choir – choir

=== Musicians ===
- Tony Newton – bass
- Corrado Canonici – double bass
- Ollie Usiskin – drums
- Chris Jones – electric guitar
- Matt Pearce – electric guitar
- Raffaello Gentili – electric guitar
- Leigh Alexandra – keyboards
- European Cinematic Symphony Orchestra – orchestra

=== Production ===
- Juan Aneiros – production
- Monica Tong – assistant production
- Juan Ramirez – co-production
- Corrado Canonici – executive production
- Andy Jackson – engineering, mastering
- Marco Sabiu – orchestration, conducting
- Mauro Conti – management vocal consulting
