= Louise Distras =

English musician

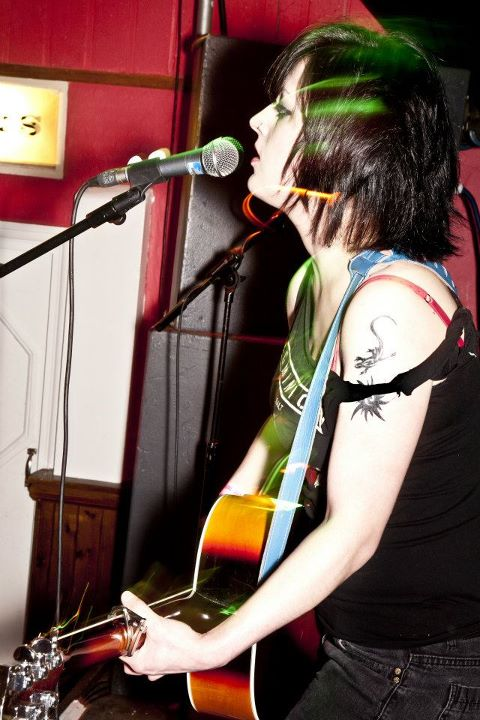
- Distras in 2012

Background information
- Genres: Alternative Rock
- Occupations: Singer, songwriter
- Instruments: Vocals, Guitar
- Years active: 2012 – present
- Website: www.louisedistras.com

Louise Distras is an English singer, songwriter and musician from Wakefield, West Yorkshire.

== Early life ==
Louise Distras was born in Wakefield, a city in the North of England, in 1987. She taught herself to play the violin and guitar, the latter by skipping school and listening to Nirvana's "Bleach". She ran away from home during her teenage years, finding solace in songwriting and guitar-playing.

== Career ==
=== 2012–2015: Early career and Dreams from the Factory Floor ===
Louise Distras began performing live in 2012, starting in pubs and at open mic nights. She met Anne Scargill, who inspired her to write for women, leading to her first single "The Hand You Hold" released on YouTube on International Women's Day 2012, which garnered media attention from The Guardian, The Independent, and BBC Radio 1. In 2015, she released her debut album, Dreams from the Factory Floor, and toured America, Canada, Scandinavia, and Europe, opening for bands like The Damned, Buzzcocks, Stiff Little Fingers, and Television. Music journalist John Robb called her "the most important protest singer we have" in a review on the Louder Than War website.

=== 2016 – 2019: Rising profile and "Street Revolution" EP ===
In 2016, Louise Distras released the single "Aileen" through Kerrang!, indicating a shift in her musical direction. Kerrang! magazine recognised her as a "Star of 2017", describing her as "the most exciting voice in UK punk." "Aileen" received radio play from BBC Radio 1's Huw Stephens, Radio X's John Kennedy, and KROQ's Rodney Bingenheimer and was included in the "Hugs for Chelsea" benefit album, which was featured by Rolling Stone.

Throughout this period, Distras toured the UK and Europe with The King Blues. She headlined the Nick Alexander stage at Frank Turner's Lost Evenings Festival in London and made a second appearance at Glastonbury Festival, invited by Billy Bragg.

In 2018, she announced work on her second album and released the music video for "Land of Dope and Glory", directed by MTV VMA-nominated Lewis Cater, which she described as "inspired by Black Mirror" with a dystopian aesthetic, in an interview with Loudersound.

In 2019, Distras released the "Street Revolution" EP, which was well received by Kerrang!, who praised her vocal capabilities. The title track "Street Revolution" was highlighted by Radio X's John Kennedy and listed among DJ Gary Crowley's top tracks of the year.

During this time she also performed in Germany, opening for bands like The Subways, The Interrupters, Dead Kennedys, and Dropkick Murphys, and contributed as a guest on The King Blues' album "38 Minutes".

=== 2020–2022: Covid 19 and creative pause ===
Distras announced via social media that the release of her new album was delayed due to the impact of the COVID-19 pandemic on the music industry. She also mentioned experiencing online abuse during this period.

On 4 November 2022, she released a new single titled "Black Skies", featuring a spoken-word introduction by Steve Ignorant of Crass.

In an interview with Backseat Mafia, Distras disclosed that she resorted to crowdfunding for her upcoming album since she never received payment for sales from her debut album, Dreams from the Factory Floor.

=== 2023: New album Beauty After Bruises ===
On 27 January, Louise Distras released the single "Girl in the Mirror" and announced her second album, Beauty After Bruises, which was released on 28 April via Ministry of Love Records. She described the album as, "I don't want to make music that's a space for the best, glossy version of myself so Beauty After Bruises is about the ugly truth. This album is messy just like me and it's about honouring the parts of myself that I looked away from."

Beauty After Bruises was recorded at 25th Street Studios in Oakland, California, with producer Ross Peterson, who has been Grammy-nominated for his work with artists like Bruce Springsteen and Elle King. The album was mixed by Stephen Street, known for his collaborations with bands like The Smiths, The Cranberries, and Blur. Notable guest musicians on the album include Mick Talbot of The Style Council and Dexys Midnight Runners on keyboards, and Gunnar Olsen of Puscifer on drums.

Reviews of the album were generally positive. Louderthanwar described Distras's contribution to punk music, stating, "Punk is about attitude and Louise has enough for the whole of Yorkshire. Her voice was always emotional but now it's more introspective, more mature and distinctive. With less shouting, she has become a voice to be heard."

Clash magazine praised the release, noting, "Wakefield's underground heroine Louise Distras is at her best on new album Beauty After Bruises," and described it as "a hugely endearing return from a massive talent."

== Artistry and style ==
Louise Distras's musical influences include Nirvana, with their 1989 debut album Bleach being her favourite. Her earlier influences encompass a wide range of artists such as Bee Gees, Queen, ABBA, Sex Pistols, Whitney Houston, Oasis, and Lydia Lunch.

Distras has incorporated elements of the classic 1977 punk rock aesthetic in her work, particularly evident in the music videos for "The Hand You Hold" and "Shades of Hate".

== Personal life ==
Louise Distras labels herself as a "soft working class feminist," her identity deeply rooted in her Northern English background. She has championed feminist issues, notably by supporting the Russian punk band Pussy Riot in 2012.

In 2015 she gave a performance with Mick Jones of The Clash and Glen Matlock of the Sex Pistols at London's Coronet Theatre. The event was a fundraiser for the London Fire Brigade, held in memory of Joe Strummer.

By 2019, she had become an ambassador for Musicians Against Homelessness, collaborating with key figures like Jon Sparkes of Crisis, Alan McGee, Shaun Ryder, and Neville Staple from The Specials, to fight homelessness through a campaign at the Houses of Parliament in London.

In more recent years, her political stance has shifted, and she has been described as aligning with right-leaning positions. In 2024, she was reported to have attended and performed at a rally in London organised by activist Tommy Robinson.

== Discography ==
=== Albums ===
- Dreams from the Factory Floor, Street Revolution Records, CD/DD, 2013, Pirates Press Records, LP, 2015
- Beauty After Bruises, DD, CD, LP, Ministry Of Love Records Department 2023

=== Singles/EPs ===
- "The Hand You Hold", DD 2012
- "Shades of Hate", DD 2012
- "Stand Strong Together", DD 2013
- "Love Me the Way I Am"/"Bullets", 7", DD 2014
- "Bullets", DD 2015
- "Aileen", CD, DD 2016
- "Outside of You", DD 2017
- "Land of Dope and Glory", DD 2018
- "Street Revolution" EP, CD, DD 2019
- "Black Skies", DD, Ministry Of Love Records Department 2022
- "Girl in the Mirror", DD, Ministry Of Love Records Department 2023
- "Factory Girl", DD, Ministry Of Love Records Department 2023
- "Truth in Your Lies", DD, Ministry Of Love Records Department 2023
- "Love & Money", DD, Ministry Of Love Records Department 2023

=== Compilation appearances ===
- "Aileen" on Hugs for Chelsea, DD, 2016

=== Collaborations ===
- Paradise by The King Blues, 38 Minutes CD, DD, 2019
- Boomer and the Severed Goats Head by The King Blues, 38 Minutes CD, DD, 2019
- Black Skies by Louise Distras featuring Steve Ignorant, DD, 2022
