= Revelation (Christopher Lee album) =

Studio album by Christopher Lee
- Released: 10 June 2006
- Recorded: 2006
- Genre: Vocal
- Length: 58:38
- Label: Magic Film

Christopher Lee chronology
| Christopher Lee Sings Devils, Rogues & Other Villains (1998) | Revelation (2006) | Charlemagne: By the Sword and the Cross (2010) |

Revelation is a solo cover album released in 2006 by the English actor and singer Christopher Lee. A music video for the song "My Way" (originally written by Paul Anka) was released, featuring Lee in and around his home in Cadogan Square.

== Track listing ==
1. Previously Unreleased Track "Alexander Townley – The Pum" – 7:06
2. "The Impossible Dream (The Quest)" – 3:28
3. "I, Don Quixote – Man of la Mancha" – 3:42
4. "Carmencita – Quiero y no quiero querer" – 4:06
5. "The Toreador March – Flamenco Mix" – 5:21
6. "O Sole Mio – It's Now or Never" 3:51
7. "High Noon" – 2:23
8. "Wanderin' Star" – 3:44
9. "Oh What a Beautiful Mornin'" – 2:58
10. "Name Your Poison" – 3:13
11. "Toreador March – Heavy Metal Mix" – 4:39
12. "The Little Drummer Boy" – 3:02
13. "Silent Night" – 2:59
14. "My Way" – 4:34
15. Behind the Music – with Christopher Lee – 22:20
