= Christopher Lee =

English actor and singer (1922–2015)

Sir Christopher Lee CBE CStJ
- Lee in The Hound of the Baskervilles (1959)
- Born: Christopher Frank Carandini Lee; 27 May 1922; Belgravia, London, England
- Died: 7 June 2015 (aged 93); Chelsea, London, England
- Occupations: Actor; singer; military officer
- Years active: 1948–2015
- Spouse: Birgit Krøncke (m. 1961)
- Children: 1
- Relatives: Marie Carandini (great-grandmother); Christie Palmerston (great-uncle); Harriet Walter (niece)
- Awards: Knight Bachelor (2009)
- Musical career
- Genres: Opera; symphonic metal; power metal
- Military career
- Allegiance: Finland (1939); United Kingdom (1940–1946)
- Branch: Finnish Army (1939); Home Guard (1940); Royal Air Force (1941–1946)
- Service years: 1939–1946
- Rank: Flight lieutenant
- Conflicts: World War II; Winter War; North African campaign; Allied invasion of Italy; Battle of Monte Cassino; World War II in Yugoslavia; Raid on Drvar

Signature
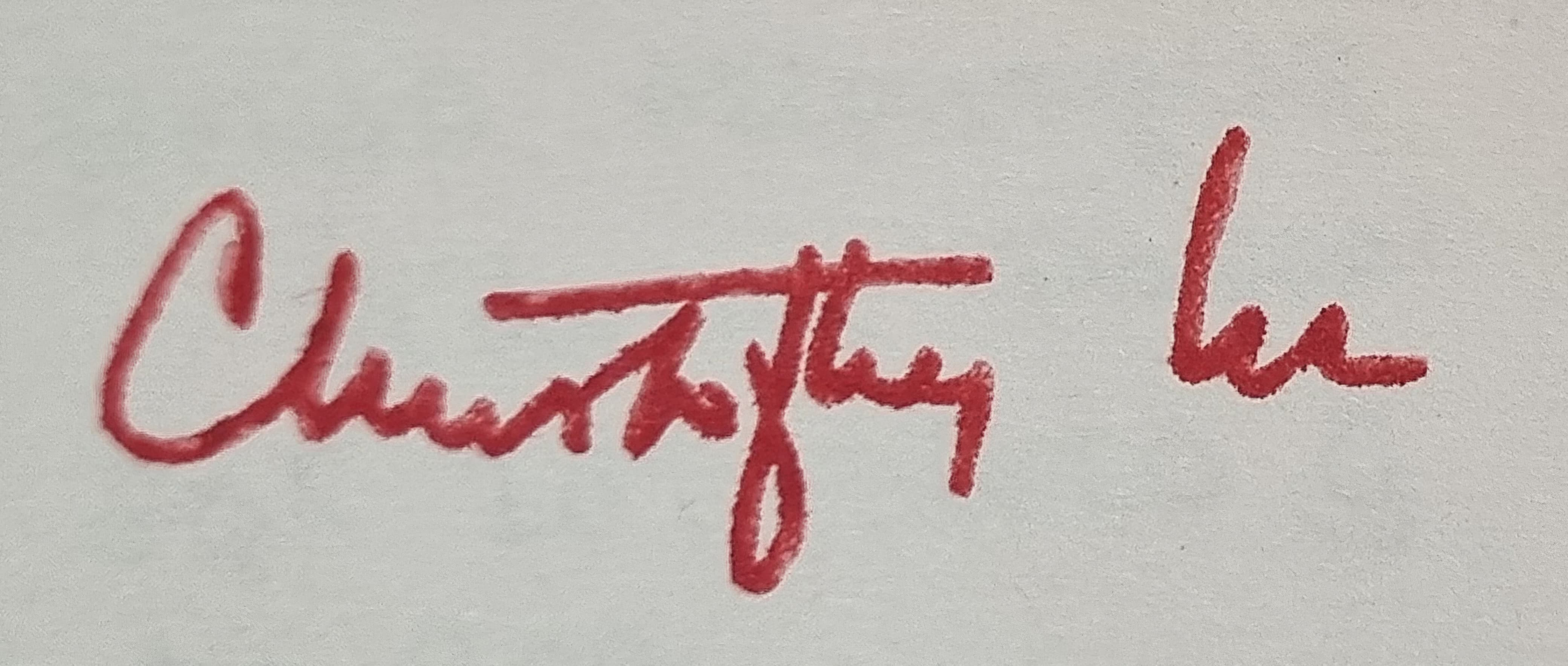

Sir Christopher Frank Carandini Lee (27 May 1922 – 7 June 2015) was an English actor and singer. In a career spanning over 60 years, he became known as an actor with tremendous screen presence and a deep and commanding voice, who often portrayed villains in horror and franchise films. Lee was knighted for services to drama and charity in June 2009, and received the BAFTA Fellowship in 2011 and the BFI Fellowship in 2013.

After playing smaller roles in films like Corridor of Mirrors (1948), Captain Horatio Hornblower (1951), Moulin Rouge (1952), Bitter Victory (1957), and A Tale of Two Cities (1958), Lee gained fame for portraying Count Dracula in seven Hammer Horror films, beginning with Dracula (1958). A fixture of Hammer films, he starred in Taste of Fear (1961), Rasputin the Mad Monk (1966), The Devil Rides Out (1968), To the Devil a Daughter (1976), and opposite his friend Peter Cushing in The Curse of Frankenstein (1957), The Hound of the Baskervilles (1959), The Mummy (1959), and The Gorgon (1964). He also starred in other horror films, such as The City of the Dead (1960), The Whip and the Body (1963), Castle of the Living Dead (1964), Dr. Terror's House of Horrors (1965), Eugenie (1969), The House That Dripped Blood (1971), Horror Express (1972), and Death Line (1972).

Lee received praise for his performances as Lord Summerisle in The Wicker Man (1973) and Francisco Scaramanga in the James Bond film The Man with the Golden Gun (1974). He returned to prominence with a new generation of audiences for his roles as Saruman in The Lord of the Rings film trilogy (2001–2003), which he reprised in The Hobbit film trilogy (2012–2014), and as Count Dooku in Star Wars: Episode II – Attack of the Clones (2002) and Star Wars: Episode III – Revenge of the Sith (2005). Around this time, he became a frequent collaborator of Tim Burton, appearing in his films Sleepy Hollow (1999), Corpse Bride (2005), Charlie and the Chocolate Factory (2005), Alice in Wonderland (2010), and Dark Shadows (2012). Other notable film credits include The Three Musketeers (1973), Airport '77 (1977), The Last Unicorn (1982), Gremlins 2: The New Batch (1990), Jinnah (1998), and Hugo (2011).

Lee was also a classically trained singer with a passion for heavy metal. He recorded several albums, including the symphonic-metal concept albums Charlemagne: By the Sword and the Cross (2010) and Charlemagne: The Omens of Death (2013), portraying the title character of Charlemagne. These projects featured Lee providing spoken word, singing, and dramatic narration.

== Early life ==
Christopher Frank Carandini Lee was born on 27 May 1922 in Belgravia, London, to Lieutenant Colonel Geoffrey Trollope Lee (1879–1941) of the 60th King's Royal Rifle Corps, and Countess Estelle Marie (née Carandini di Sarzano) (1889–1981). Geoffrey fought in the Boer War and First World War, and Estelle was an Edwardian beauty who was painted by Sir John Lavery, Oswald Birley, and Olive Snell, and sculpted by Clare Sheridan. Lee's maternal great-grandfather, Jerome Carandini, the Marquis of Sarzano, had Italian roots; and Lee's maternal great-grandmother was the English-born opera singer Marie Carandini (née Burgess). Lee had an elder sister, Xandra Carandini Lee (1917–2002), and a younger brother, Nicholas.

Lee's parents separated when he was four and divorced two years later. During this time, Lee's mother took his sister and him to Wengen in Switzerland. After enrolling in Miss Fisher's Academy in Territet, Lee played his first role, as Rumpelstiltskin. They then returned to London, where Lee attended Wagner's private school in Queen's Gate, and his mother married Harcourt George St-Croix Rose, a banker and uncle of Ian Fleming. Fleming, author of the James Bond novels, thus became Lee's step-cousin. The family moved to Fulham, living next door to the actor Eric Maturin. One night, Lee was introduced to Prince Felix Yusupov and Grand Duke Dmitri Pavlovich, the assassins of Grigori Rasputin, whom Lee was to play many years later.

When Lee was nine, he was sent to Summer Fields School, a preparatory school in Oxford, some of whose pupils later attended Eton College. Lee continued acting in school plays, though "the laurels deservedly went to Patrick Macnee." He applied for a scholarship to Eton, where his interview was in the presence of the ghost story author M. R. James. Lee's poor maths skills meant that he was placed eleventh and missed out on being a King's Scholar by one place. Lee's stepfather was not willing to pay the higher fees for Lee to be an Oppidan Scholar, so instead Lee attended Wellington College, where he won scholarships in the classics after studying Ancient Greek and Latin. Aside from a "tiny part" in a school play, Lee did not act while at Wellington. He was a "passable" racquets player and fencer and a competent cricketer but did not do well at the other sports of hockey, football, rugby and boxing. Lee disliked the parades and weapons training and would always "play dead" as soon as possible during mock battles. He was frequently beaten at school, including once at Wellington for "being beaten too often", though Lee accepted them as "logical and therefore acceptable" punishments for knowingly breaking the rules. By the summer term of 1939, which was Lee's last at Wellington College, his stepfather had accrued gambling debts of £25,000 (equivalent to £1,400,000 in 2025).

When Lee's mother separated from Rose, Lee was compelled to work. His sister was already working as a secretary for the Church of England Pensions Board. There were no immediate opportunities for Lee, who was sent to the French Riviera, where his sister was on holiday with friends. On his way there, Lee stopped briefly in Paris, where he stayed with the journalist Webb Miller, a friend of Rose, and witnessed Eugen Weidmann's execution by guillotine, which was the last public execution performed in France. Arriving in Menton, Lee stayed with the Russian Mazirov family among exiled princely families. It was arranged that he should remain in Menton after his sister had returned home, but with Europe on the brink of war, Lee returned to London. He worked as an office clerk for United States Lines, taking care of the mail and running errands.

== Military service ==
Almost all of what is known of Lee’s military service is based on a chronology of events as set out in his autobiography. When the Second World War broke out in 1939, Lee had enrolled in a military academy and volunteered to fight for the Finnish Army against the Soviet Union during the Winter War. He and other British volunteers were kept away from the fighting, but they were issued with winter gear and were posted on guard duty a safe distance from the border. After two weeks in Finland, they returned home. In a later interview, Lee said that he knew how to shoot but not how to ski and that he probably would not be alive if he had been allowed to go to the front line.

Lee returned to work at United States Lines and found his work more satisfying, feeling that he was contributing. In early 1940, Lee joined Beecham's, at first as an office clerk, then as a switchboard operator. When Beecham's moved out of London, he joined the Home Guard. In the winter, Lee's father fell ill with bilateral pneumonia and died on 12 March 1941. Realising that he had no inclination to follow his father into the Army, Lee decided to enlist while he still had some choice of service and volunteered for the Royal Air Force.

Lee reported to RAF Uxbridge for training and was then posted to the Initial Training Wing at Paignton. After passing his exams in Liverpool, the British Commonwealth Air Training Plan meant that Lee travelled on the Reina del Pacifico to South Africa, then to his posting at Hillside, at Bulawayo in Southern Rhodesia. Training with de Havilland Tiger Moths, Lee took his penultimate training session before his first solo flight, during which he began to suffer from headaches and blurred vision. The medical officer hesitantly diagnosed a failure of Lee's optic nerve, and he was told he would never be allowed to fly again. Lee was devastated, and the death of a fellow trainee from his former school, Summer Fields, only made Lee more despondent. His appeals were fruitless, and he was left with nothing to do. Lee was moved around to different flying stations before being posted to Southern Rhodesia's capital, Salisbury, in December 1941. He then visited the Mazowe Dam, Marandellas, the Wankie Game Reserve and the ruins of Great Zimbabwe. Thinking he should "do something constructive for my keep", Lee applied to join RAF Intelligence. His superiors praised his initiative, and Lee was seconded into the British South Africa Police and was posted as a warder at Salisbury Prison. He was then promoted to leading aircraftman. Leaving South Africa, he sailed from Durban to Suez on the SS Nieuw Amsterdam.

After "killing time" at RAF Kasfareet near the Great Bitter Lake in the Suez Canal Zone in 1942, Lee resumed intelligence work in the city of Ismaïlia. He was then attached to No. 205 Group RAF before being commissioned at the end of January 1943, and attached to No. 260 Squadron RAF as an intelligence officer. As the North African campaign progressed, the squadron "leapfrogged" between Egyptian airstrips, from RAF El Daba to Maaten Bagush and on to Mersa Matruh; they lent air support to the ground forces and bombed strategic targets. Lee, "broadly speaking, was expected to know everything." The Allied advance continued into Libya, through Tobruk and Benghazi to the Marble Arch (a triumphal arch built by Fascist Italy) and then through El Agheila, Khoms and Tripoli, with the squadron averaging five missions a day. As the advance continued into Tunisia, with the Axis forces digging themselves in at the Mareth Line, Lee was almost killed when the squadron's airfield was bombed. After the Battle of the Mareth Line, the squadron made their final base in Kairouan; following the Axis surrender in North Africa in May 1943, the squadron moved to Zuwarah in Libya in preparation for the Allied invasion of Sicily. They then moved to Malta, and, after its capture by the British Eighth Army, the Sicilian town of Pachino, before making a permanent base in Agnone Bagni.

At the end of July 1943, Lee received his second promotion of the year, this time to flying officer. After the Sicilian campaign was over, Lee came down with malaria for the sixth time in under a year, and was flown to a hospital in Carthage for treatment. When he returned, the squadron was restless, frustrated with a lack of news about the Eastern Front and the Soviet Union in general, and with no mail from home and no alcohol. Unrest spread and threatened to turn into mutiny. Lee, by now an expert on Russia, talked them into resuming their duties, which much impressed his commanding officer.

Following the Allied invasion of Italy, the squadron was based in Foggia and Termoli during the winter of 1943, where Lee was then seconded to the Army during an officers' swap scheme. During most of the Battle of Monte Cassino, he was attached to the Gurkhas of the 8th Indian Infantry Division. While spending some time on leave in Naples, Lee climbed Mount Vesuvius, which erupted three days later. During the final assault on Monte Cassino, the squadron was based in San Angelo, and Lee was nearly killed when one of the planes crashed on takeoff, and he tripped over one of its live bombs. After the battle, the squadron moved to airfields just outside Rome, and Lee visited the city, where he met his mother's cousin, Nicolò Carandini, who had fought in the Italian resistance movement.

In November 1944, Lee was promoted to flight lieutenant and left the squadron in Jesi to take up a posting at Air Force HQ. He took part in forward planning and liaison, in preparation for a potential assault into the rumoured German Alpine Fortress. After the war ended, Lee was invited to go hunting near Vienna and was then billeted in Pörtschach am Wörthersee. For the final few months of his service, Lee, who spoke fluent French, Italian, and German, among other languages, was seconded to the Central Registry of War Criminals and Security Suspects. Here, he was tasked with helping to track down Nazi war criminals. Of his time with the organisation, Lee said: "We were given dossiers of what they'd done and told to find them, interrogate them as much as we could and hand them over to the appropriate authority". He completed his service with the RAF, in 1946.

Lee said that during the war he was attached to special forces, but declined to give details. Lee's stepfather served as a captain in the Intelligence Corps, but it is unlikely he had any influence over Lee's military career. Lee saw his stepfather for the last time on a bus in London in 1940, after he was divorced from Lee's mother, and Lee did not speak to him.

== Career ==
=== 1947–1957: Career beginnings ===
Returning to London in 1946, Lee was offered his old job back at Beecham's with a significant raise, but he turned them down as "I couldn't think myself back into the office frame of mind." The Armed Forces were sending veterans with an education in the Classics to teach at universities, but Lee felt his Latin was too rusty and didn't care for the strict curfews. During lunch with his mother's cousin Nicolò Carandini, who had become the Italian Ambassador to Britain, Lee was detailing his war wounds when Carandini said, "Why don't you become an actor, Christopher?" Lee liked the idea, and after assuaging his mother's protests by pointing to the successful Carandini performers in Australia (who included his great-grandmother Marie Carandini, an opera singer), he met Nicolò's friend Filippo Del Giudice, a lawyer-turned-film producer and head of Two Cities Films, part of the Rank Organisation. Lee recalled that Giudice "looked me up and down" and "concluded that I was just what the industry had been looking for." He was sent to see Josef Somlo for a contract:

Initially, I was told [by Somlo] I was too tall to be an actor. That's a quite fatuous remark to make. It's like saying you're too short to play the piano. I thought, "Right, I'll show you..." At the beginning I didn't know anything about the technique of working in front of a camera, but during those 10 years, I did the one thing that's so vitally important today – I watched, I listened and I learned. So when the time came I was ready... Oddly enough, to play a character who said nothing [The Creature in The Curse of Frankenstein].

Somlo sent Lee to see Rank's David Henley and Olive Dodds, who signed him on a seven-year contract. Like other students at Rank's "Charm School," Lee had difficulty finding work. He finally made his film début in 1948, in Terence Young's Gothic romance Corridor of Mirrors. He played Charles; the director got around his height by placing him at a table in a nightclub alongside Lois Maxwell, Mavis Villiers, Hugh Latimer and John Penrose. Lee had a single line, "a satirical shaft meant to qualify the lead's bravura."

In this early period, Lee made an uncredited appearance in Laurence Olivier's film version of Hamlet (1948), as a spear carrier (his later co-star and close friend Peter Cushing played Osric). A few years later, he appeared in Captain Horatio Hornblower (1951) as a Spanish captain. Lee was cast when the director asked him if he could speak Spanish and fence, which he was able to do. Lee appeared uncredited in the American epic Quo Vadis (1951), which was shot in Rome, playing a chariot driver and was injured when he was thrown from it at one point during the shoot.

Lee recalled that his breakthrough came in 1952, when Douglas Fairbanks, Jr. began making films at the British National Studios. He said in 2006, "I was cast in various roles in 16 of them and even appeared with Buster Keaton and it proved an excellent training ground." The same year, Lee appeared in John Huston's Oscar-nominated Moulin Rouge. Throughout the next decade, he made nearly 30 films, including The Cockleshell Heroes, playing mostly stock action characters.

=== 1957–1976: Work with Hammer ===
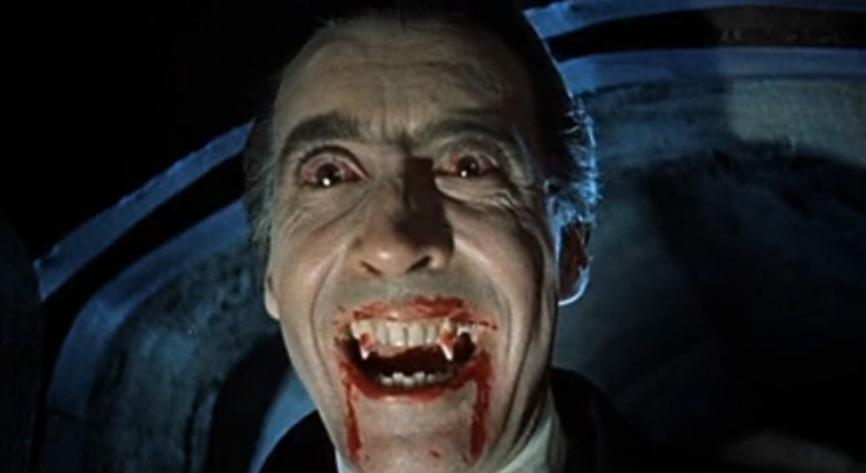
Lee as the title character in Dracula (1958). He fixed the image of the fanged vampire in popular culture.

Lee's first film for Hammer Film Productions was The Curse of Frankenstein (1957), in which he played Frankenstein's monster, with Peter Cushing as Baron Victor Frankenstein. It was the first film to co-star Lee and Cushing, who ultimately appeared together in over 20 films and became close friends. When Lee arrived at a casting session for the film, "they asked me if I wanted the part, I said yes and that was that." A little later, he co-starred with Boris Karloff in the film Corridors of Blood (1958). Lee had previously appeared with Karloff in 1955 in the "At Night, All Cats are Grey" episode of the British television series Colonel March of Scotland Yard. Karloff and Lee were London neighbours for a time in the mid-1960s.

Lee's Dracula is a force of nature: red-eyed, blood dripping from fangs, often in the grip of rage. He's hypnotic, physically powerful, well-spoken, but Lee also understood – crucially – that an important layer from Bram Stoker's novel had been missing from Lugosi's performance: sexuality. Lee's Dracula is a rampant sex fiend, using that stare to make buxom ladies everywhere come over a little faint.

— Empire magazine's entry for Lee's portrayal of Dracula as the 7th Greatest Horror Movie Character of All Time.

Lee's own appearance as Frankenstein's monster led to his first appearance as the Transylvanian vampire Count Dracula in the film Dracula (1958, known as Horror of Dracula in the US). The film saw Lee's "triumphant debut" fix the image of the fanged vampire in popular culture, according to the writer Kevin Jackson. Dracula has been ranked among the best British films. Lee introduced a dark, brooding sexuality to the character, with Tim Stanley stating, "Lee's sensuality was subversive in that it hinted that women might quite like having their neck chewed on by a stud." The film magazine Empire ranked Lee's portrayal the 7th Greatest Horror Movie Character of All Time. CNN listed the performance third in their top 10 British villains, noting his "chilling, sonorous tone." Lee accepted a similar role in the Italian comedy horror film Uncle Was a Vampire (1959). That same year, he starred as Kharis in Hammer's The Mummy, and played Sir Henry Baskerville (to Cushing's Sherlock Holmes) in The Hound of the Baskervilles. Lee later played Holmes himself in Sherlock Holmes and the Deadly Necklace (1962). In the same year, he played a leading role in the German film The Puzzle of the Red Orchid, speaking German, which he had learned during his education in Switzerland. Lee auditioned for a part in the film The Longest Day, but was turned down because he did not "look like a military man". Some film books incorrectly credit Lee with a role in the film, something he had to correct for the rest of his life.

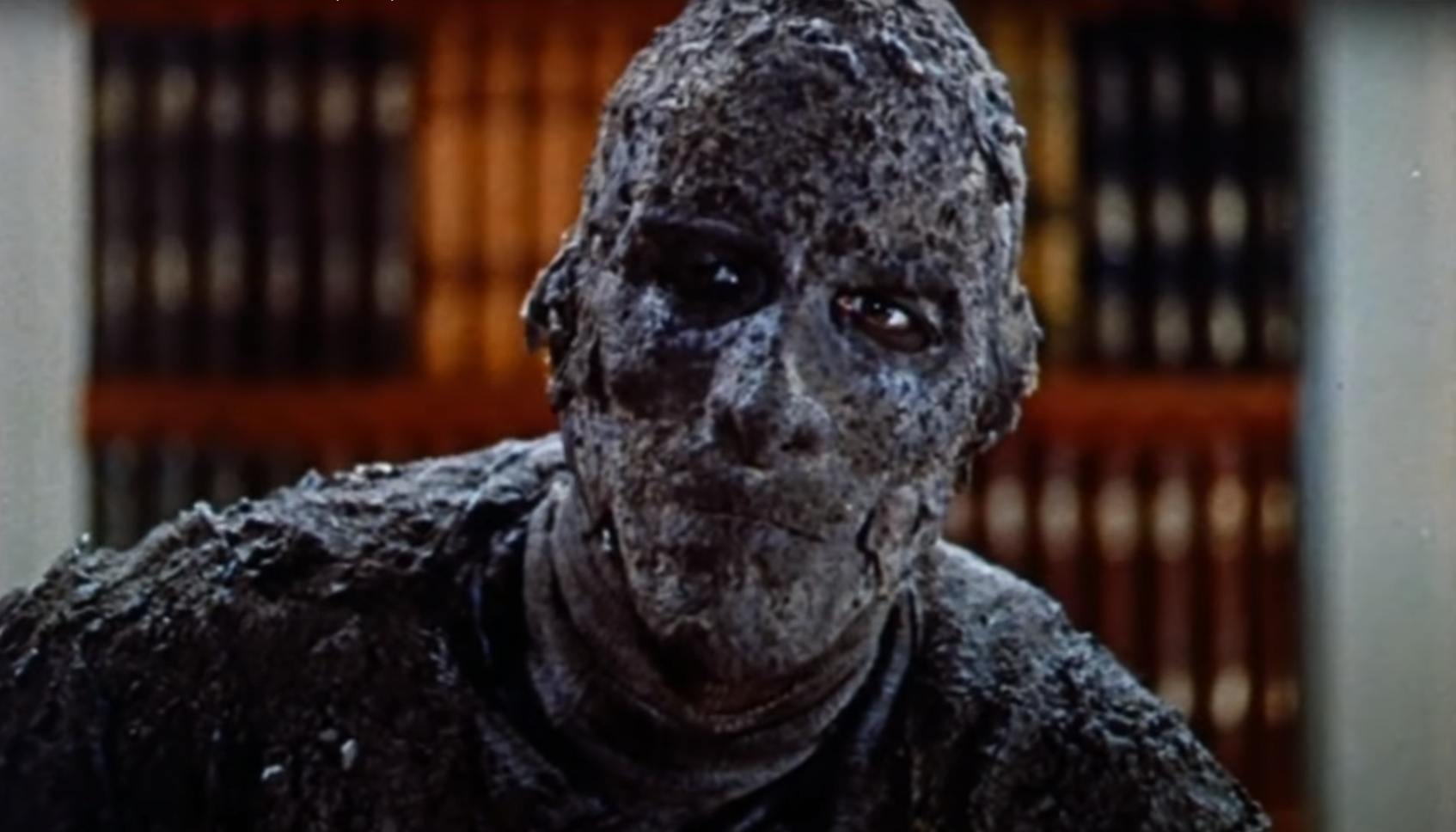
Lee as Kharis in The Mummy (1959)

Lee returned to the role of Dracula in Hammer's Dracula: Prince of Darkness (1966). Lee's role has no lines; he merely hisses his way through the film. Stories vary as to the reason for this: Lee stated he refused to speak the poor dialogue he was given, but the screenwriter Jimmy Sangster said that the script did not contain any lines for the character. This film set the standard for most of the Dracula sequels in the sense that half the film's running time was spent on telling the story of Dracula's resurrection and the character's appearances were brief. Lee went on record to state that he was virtually "blackmailed" by Hammer into starring in the subsequent films; unable or unwilling to pay him his going rate, they would resort to reminding him of how many people he would put out of work if he did not take part:

The process went like this: The telephone would ring and my agent would say, "Jimmy Carreras [President of Hammer Films] has been on the phone, they've got another Dracula for you." And I would say, "Forget it! I don't want to do another one." I'd get a call from Jimmy Carreras, in a state of hysteria. "What's all this about?!" "Jim, I don't want to do it, and I don't have to do it." "No, you have to do it!" And I said, "Why?" He replied, "Because I've already sold it to the American distributor with you playing the part. Think of all the people you know so well, that you will put out of work!" Emotional blackmail. That's the only reason I did them.

Lee's roles in the films Dracula Has Risen from the Grave (1968), Taste the Blood of Dracula, and Scars of Dracula (both 1970) all gave the Count very little to do. Lee said in an interview in 2005, "all they do is write a story and try and fit the character in somewhere, which is very clear when you see the films. They gave me nothing to do! I pleaded with Hammer to let me use some of the lines that Bram Stoker had written. Occasionally, I sneaked one in." He starred in two further Dracula films for Hammer in the early 1970s, Dracula A.D. 1972 (1972) and The Satanic Rites of Dracula (1973), both of which brought the character into the modern era. The Satanic Rites of Dracula was the last Dracula film in which Lee played the role, as he felt he had played it too many times and that the films had deteriorated in quality. It was tentatively titled Dracula Is Dead... and Well and Living in London, a parody of the stage and film musical revue Jacques Brel is Alive and Well and Living in Paris (1968), but Lee was not amused. Speaking at a press conference in 1973 to announce the film, Lee said, "I'm doing it under protest. I think it is fatuous. I can think of twenty adjectives – fatuous, pointless, absurd. It's not a comedy, but it's got a comic title. I don't see the point." In all, Lee played Dracula 10 times: seven films for Hammer Productions, once for Jesús Franco's Count Dracula (1970), went uncredited in Jerry Lewis's One More Time (1970), and gave his final portrayal in Édouard Molinaro's Dracula and Son (1976). He also played an unnamed but Dracula-like vampire in The Magic Christian (1969).

Lee starred as Grigori Rasputin in Rasputin, the Mad Monk (1966) and returned to Sherlock Holmes films with Billy Wilder's British-made The Private Life of Sherlock Holmes (1970), in which he plays Sherlock's smarter brother, Mycroft. Lee considered this film to be the reason he stopped being typecast: "I've never been typecast since. Sure, I've played plenty of heavies, but as Anthony Hopkins says, 'I don't play villains, I play people.'"

Lee's friend, the author Dennis Wheatley, sparked his interest in the occult. Hammer made three films from Wheatley's novels, two of them starring Lee, The Devil Rides Out (1968) and To the Devil a Daughter (1976). The latter was troubled by production difficulties and disowned by the author. Although financially successful, it was Hammer's last horror film of the 20th century.

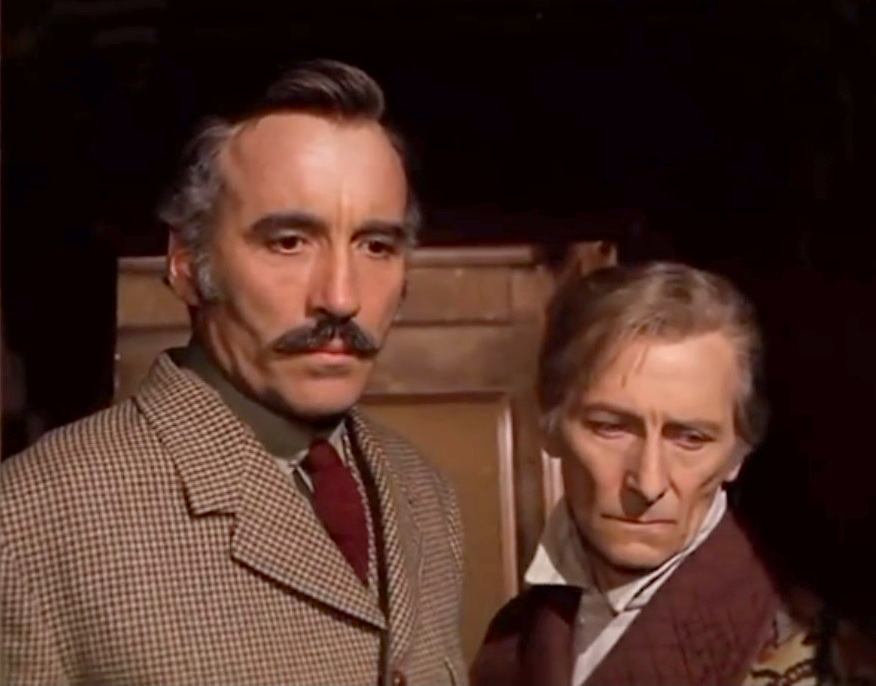
Lee and his close friend Peter Cushing in Horror Express (1972). They starred in twenty-two films together.

Like Cushing, Lee also appeared in films for other companies from 1957 to 1977. These included the Dr. Fu Manchu series between 1965 and 1969 (beginning with The Face of Fu Manchu), where he starred as the villain in yellowface make-up; I, Monster (1971), an adaptation of Robert Louis Stevenson's 1886 novella Strange Case of Dr Jekyll and Mr Hyde, with the main characters' names changed to Dr. Charles Marlowe and Mr. Edward Blake; The Creeping Flesh (1972); and his personal favourite, which Lee considered his best film, The Wicker Man (1973), in which he played Lord Summerisle. Wanting to break free of his image as Dracula and take on more interesting acting roles, Lee met with the screenwriter Anthony Shaffer, and they agreed to work together to make a horror film centring on "old religion", in sharp contrast to the popular Hammer films of the day. Loosely based on David Pinner's novel Ritual, Shaffer and Lee paid Pinner £15,000 for the rights to the novel, and Shaffer set to work on the screenplay. Lee was so keen to get the film made, and the budget was so small, that he gave his services for free.

Lee appeared as the on-screen narrator in Jess Franco's Eugenie (1970) as a favour to the producer Harry Alan Towers, unaware that it was softcore pornography, as the sex scenes were shot separately.

I had no idea that was what it was when I agreed to the role. I was told it was about the Marquis de Sade. I flew out to Spain for one day's work playing the part of a narrator. I had to wear a crimson dinner jacket. There were lots of people behind me. They all had their clothes on. There didn't seem to be anything peculiar or strange. A friend said: 'Do you know you are in a film in Old Compton Street?' In those days that was where the mackintosh brigade watched their films. 'Very funny,' I said. So I crept along there heavily disguised in dark glasses and scarf, and found the cinema and there was my name. I was furious! There was a huge row. When I had left Spain that day everyone behind me had taken their clothes off!

In addition to making films in the United Kingdom, Lee made films in mainland Europe: he appeared in two German films, Count Dracula (1970), where he again played the vampire count, and The Torture Chamber of Dr. Sadism (1967). Other films Lee made in Europe include Castle of the Living Dead (1964) and Horror Express (1972). He was a producer of the horror film Nothing But the Night (1972), in which he starred. It was the first and last film Lee produced, as he did not enjoy the process.

Lee appeared as the Comte de Rochefort in Richard Lester's The Three Musketeers (1973). He injured his left knee during filming, something he still felt many years later. After the mid-1970s, Lee eschewed horror roles almost entirely. Ian Fleming, author of the James Bond spy novels and Lee's step-cousin, had offered him the role of the titular antagonist in the first Eon-produced Bond film Dr. No (1962). Lee enthusiastically accepted, but by the time Fleming told the producers, they had already chosen Joseph Wiseman for the role. Lee finally got to play a James Bond villain in The Man with the Golden Gun (1974), in which he was cast as the assassin Francisco Scaramanga. Lee said of his performance, "In Fleming's novel he's just a West Indian thug, but in the film he's charming, elegant, amusing, lethal... I played him like the dark side of Bond."

Because of Lee's filming schedule on the Bond film in Bangkok, the director Ken Russell was unable to sign him to play the Specialist in Tommy (1975). That role was eventually given to Jack Nicholson. In an AMC documentary on Halloween (1978), John Carpenter states that he offered the role of Samuel Loomis to Peter Cushing and Christopher Lee, before Donald Pleasence took the role. Years later, Lee told Carpenter that turning down the role was the biggest regret of his career.

=== 1977–1999: Move to Hollywood ===
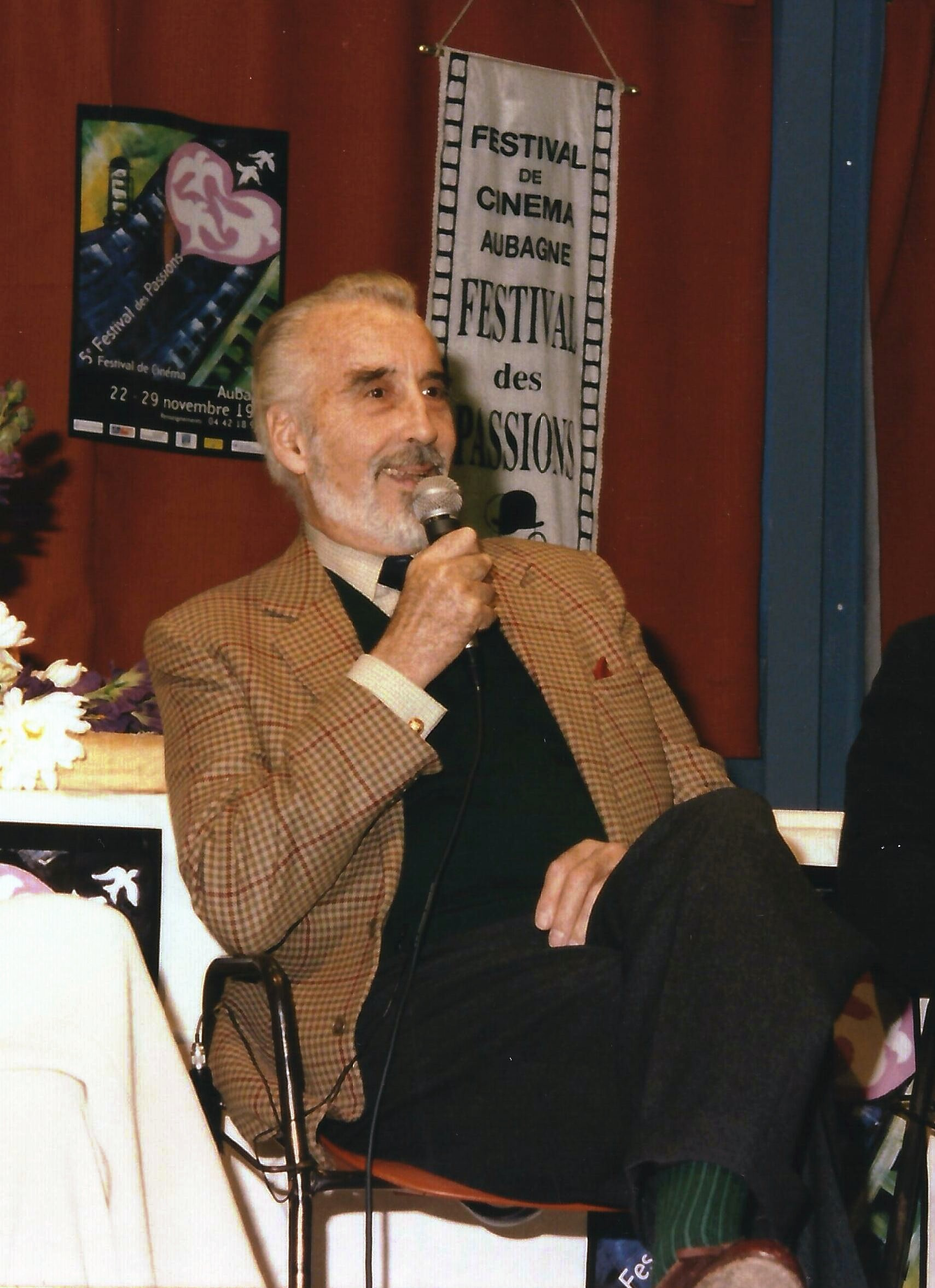
Lee at Festival des Passions in Aubagne, France, in September 1996

In 1977, Lee left the UK for the US, concerned at being typecast in horror films, as had happened to his close friends Peter Cushing and Vincent Price. His first American appearance was in the disaster film Airport '77 (1977). In 1978, Lee surprised many people with his willingness to go along with a joke, appearing as guest host on NBC's Saturday Night Live. Steven Spielberg, who was in the audience for that show, cast him in 1941 (1979). Meanwhile, Lee co-starred with Bette Davis in the Disney film Return from Witch Mountain (1978). He turned down the role of Dr. Barry Rumack (finally played by Leslie Nielsen) in the disaster spoof Airplane! (1980), a decision he later called "a big mistake."

Lee played the mad scientist Dr. Catheter in Gremlins 2: The New Batch (1990). In a nod to his role as Dracula in Hammer Films, as the Bat Gremlin transforms, Dr. Catheter experiences deja-vu – the audience hears Dracula music. Lee made his last appearances as Sherlock Holmes in the television films Incident at Victoria Falls (1991) and Sherlock Holmes and the Leading Lady (1992). He reunited with Cushing in person for the last time in a documentary, Flesh and Blood: The Hammer Heritage of Horror (1994), which they jointly narrated, two months before Cushing's death. He also appeared as Lucas de Beaumanoir, the Grand Master of the Knights Templar, in Ivanhoe (1997), the BBC/A&E co-production of Walter Scott's Ivanhoe. He was also included in two episodes of the miniseries The Odyssey (1997), directed by Andrei Konchalovsky, as the blind prophet Tiresias.

Lee considered his best performance to be in this period, when he played Pakistan's founder Muhammad Ali Jinnah in the biopic Jinnah (1998).

=== 2000–2009: Resurgence in franchise films ===
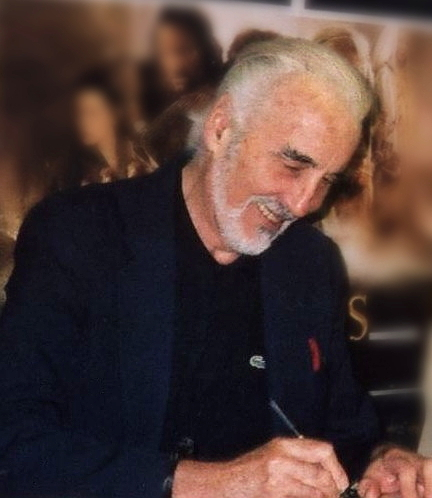
Lee at Forbidden Planet, New Oxford Street, London, signing The Two Towers

Lee played Flay in the BBC television serial Gormenghast (2000), based on Mervyn Peake's novels, and returned to film to play Saruman in Peter Jackson's The Lord of the Rings trilogy, based on the high fantasy novel by J. R. R. Tolkien. In the commentary, he stated that for decades he had dreamt of playing Gandalf, but conceded that he was now too old in his mid-70s, and that his physical limitations prevented him from being considered; Ian McKellen, who was in his early 60s, was cast in the role alongside Lee. The role of Saruman, unlike that of Gandalf, required no horse-riding and far less fighting. Lee had met Tolkien once quite by chance at a pub in Oxford, which made him the only person involved in Jackson's films to have done so. Lee made a habit of reading the novels at least once a year. He also performed for The Tolkien Ensemble's album At Dawn in Rivendell in 2003. Lee's appearance in the final film in the trilogy, The Lord of the Rings: The Return of the King, was cut from the theatrical release, but the scene was reinstated in the extended edition. The Lord of the Rings marked the beginning of a major career revival that continued with the role of the villainous Count Dooku in the George Lucas-directed Star Wars: Episode II – Attack of the Clones (2002) and Star Wars: Episode III – Revenge of the Sith (2005). Lee acted opposite Hayden Christensen, Ewan McGregor, and Natalie Portman, and did most of the swordplay himself, though a stunt double was required for the long shots with more vigorous footwork. Anthony Daniels described him as "a real bastion of cinema history" in his memoirs.

Lee played the corrupted wizard Saruman in Peter Jackson's The Lord of the Rings and The Hobbit film trilogies. The role has been described as "one of the most powerful villains in cinema history", relying on Lee's "physical appearance", in contrast to the Dark Lord Sauron.

In 2005, Lee played Dr. Wilbur Wonka, the father of Willy Wonka, in Tim Burton's film adaptation of the Roald Dahl children's classic Charlie and the Chocolate Factory. He also voiced Pastor Galswells in the animated film Corpse Bride. In 2007, Lee collaborated with Burton again on Sweeney Todd: The Demon Barber of Fleet Street, playing the spirit of Sweeney Todd's victims, called the Gentleman Ghost, alongside Anthony Head, with both singing "The Ballad of Sweeney Todd," its reprises and the Epilogue. These songs were recorded, but eventually cut since Burton felt that the songs were too theatrical for the film. Lee's appearance was completely cut from the film, but Head still had an uncredited one-line cameo. Also in 2007, Lee played the First High Councillor in The Golden Compass. In late November 2009, he narrated the Science Fiction Festival in Trieste, Italy. Also in 2009, Lee starred in Stephen Poliakoff's British period drama Glorious 39, Academy Award-nominated director Danis Tanović's war film Triage, and Duncan Ward's comedy Boogie Woogie.

During this time, Lee provided voices for numerous films and video games. He spoke fluent English, Italian, French, Spanish, and German, and was moderately proficient in Swedish, Russian, and Greek. Lee was the original voice of Thor in the German dubs of the Danish 1986 animated film Valhalla, and of King Haggard in both the English and German dubs of the 1982 animated adaptation of The Last Unicorn. He provided all the voices for the English dub of Monsieur Hulot's Holiday (1953). Lee voiced Death in the animated versions of Terry Pratchett's Soul Music and Wyrd Sisters, and reprised the role in the Sky1 live action adaptation The Colour of Magic, taking over from the late Ian Richardson. He provided the voice for the role of Ansem the Wise/DiZ in video games including Kingdom Hearts II.

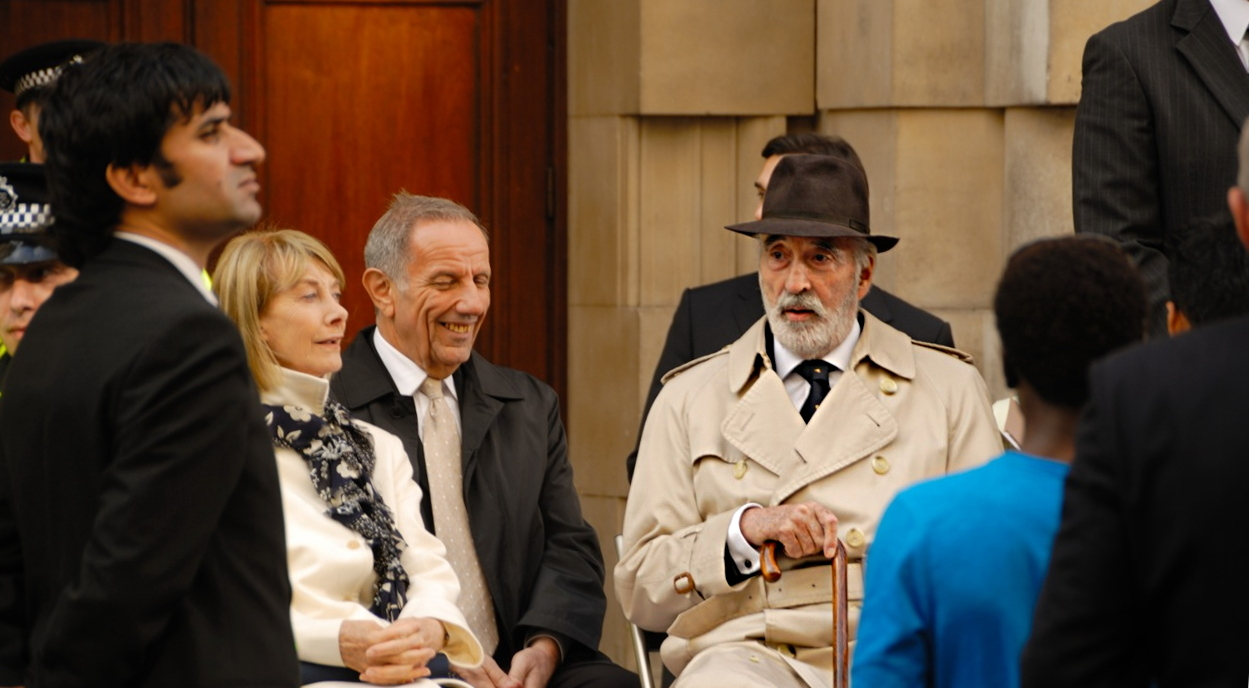
Lee filming Marcus Warren's The Heavy in Westminster, London in 2007

Lee reprised his role as Saruman in the video game The Lord of the Rings: The Battle for Middle-earth. He narrated and sang for the Danish musical group The Tolkien Ensemble's 2003 studio album At Dawn in Rivendell, taking the role of Treebeard, King Théoden and others in the readings or singing of their respective poems or songs. In 2007, Lee voiced the transcript of The Children of Húrin by J. R. R. Tolkien for the audiobook version of the novel. In 2005, he provided the voice of Pastor Galswells in The Corpse Bride, co-directed by Tim Burton and Mike Johnson. He served as the narrator on The Nightmare Before Christmas poem, also written by Tim Burton. Lee reprised his role as Count Dooku in the animated film Star Wars: The Clone Wars (2008).

Some 30 years after playing Francisco Scaramanga in The Man with the Golden Gun, Lee provided the voice of Scaramanga in the video game GoldenEye: Rogue Agent. In 2013, he voiced The Earl of Earl's Court in the BBC Radio 4 radio play Neverwhere by Neil Gaiman. Lee recorded special dialogue, in addition to serving as the Narrator, for the Lego The Hobbit video game released in April 2014; at the age of 91 years and 316 days old, he appears in the Guinness Book of Records as the oldest video game narrator.

=== 2010–2015: Later roles ===
In 2004, Lee lamented that Hollywood scripts were mainly spin-offs, as people were afraid of taking financial risks, commenting that he was mostly being offered spin-offs of Lord of the Rings or Star Wars. In 2010, Lee marked his fourth collaboration with Tim Burton by voicing the Jabberwock in Burton's adaptation of Lewis Carroll's classic book Alice in Wonderland, alongside Johnny Depp, Helena Bonham Carter and Anne Hathaway. Lee respected Depp as "a fellow survivor", describing him as "inventive and [having] enormous versatility". In 2010, Lee received the Steiger Award (Germany), and in February 2011, he was awarded the BAFTA Fellowship.

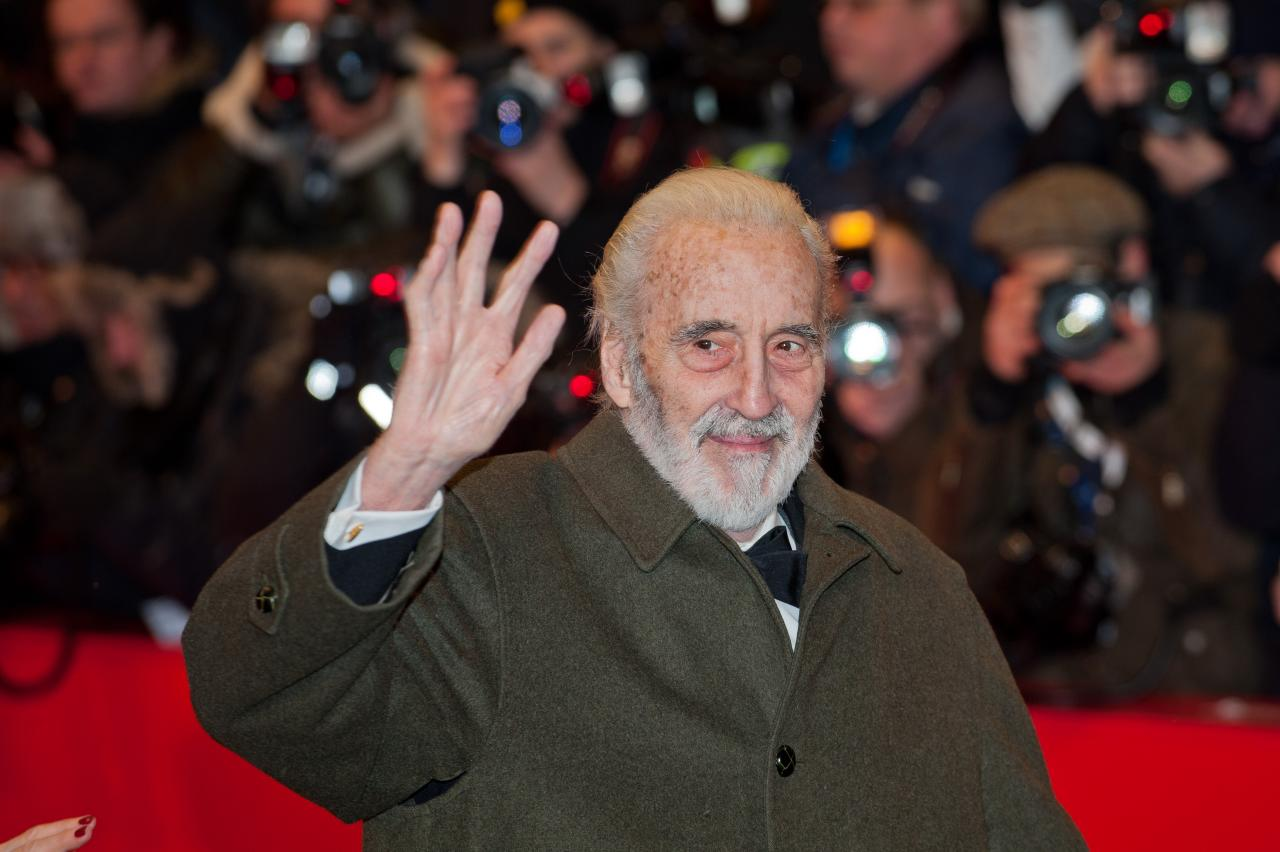
Lee at the Berlin International Film Festival in February 2012

In 2011, Lee appeared in a Hammer film, The Resident, for the first time in 35 years. The film was directed by Antti Jokinen, and Lee gave a "superbly sinister" performance alongside Hilary Swank and Jeffrey Dean Morgan. While filming scenes for the film in New Mexico in early 2009, Lee injured his back after tripping over power cables on set. Lee appears as the unnamed "Old Gentleman" who acts as Lachlan's mentor in a flashback. That same year, Lee appeared in the critically acclaimed Hugo, directed by Martin Scorsese.

Lee reprised the role of Saruman for the prequel film The Hobbit. He said he would have liked to have shown Saruman's corruption by Sauron, but was too old to travel to New Zealand, so the production was adjusted to allow him to participate from London. In 2012, Lee marked his fifth and final collaboration with Tim Burton, by appearing in Burton's film adaptation of the gothic soap opera Dark Shadows, in the small role of a New England fishing captain.

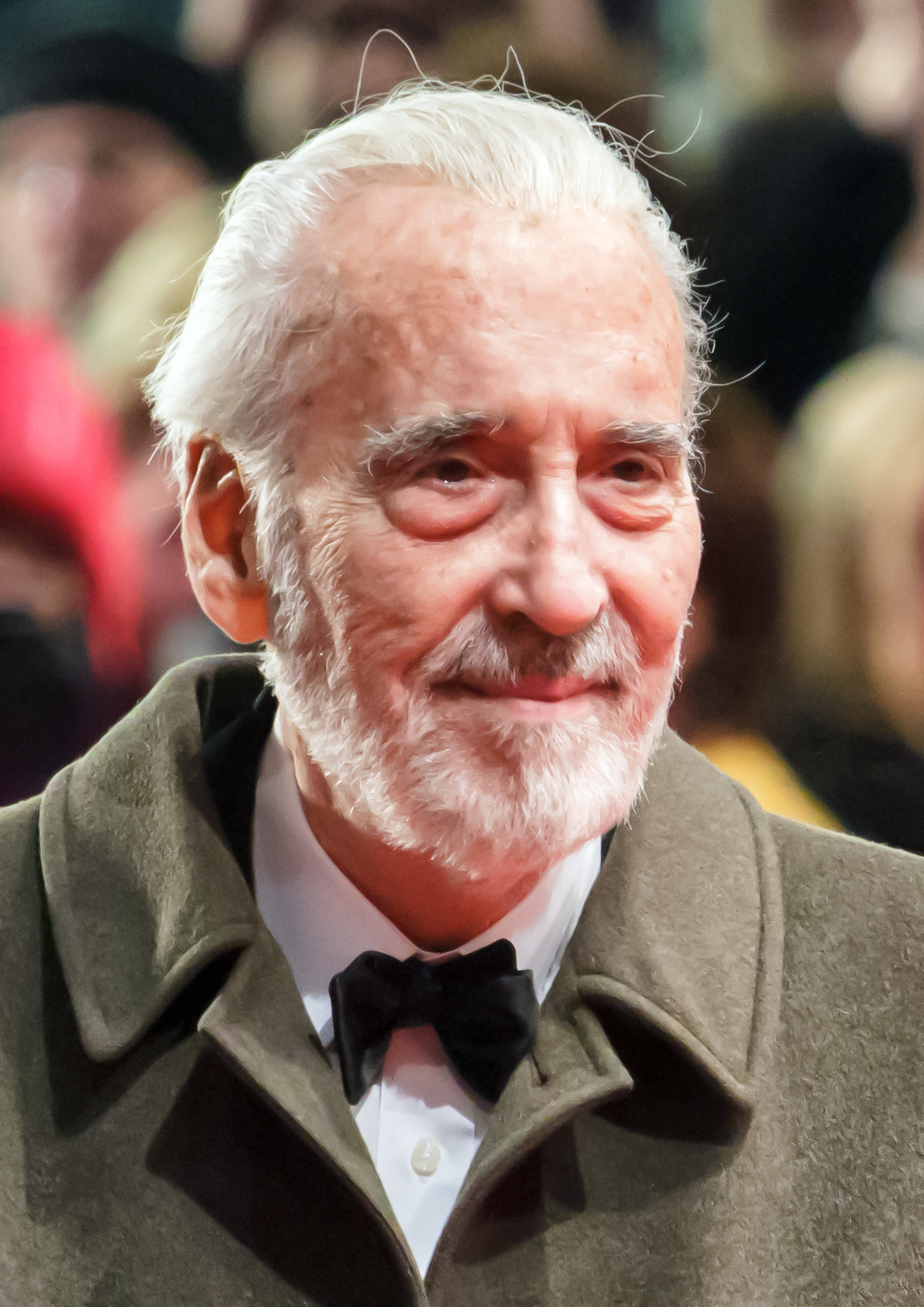
Lee at the 2013 Berlin International Film Festival

In an interview in August 2013, Lee said that he was "saddened" to hear his friend Johnny Depp was considering retiring from acting, observing that he himself had no intention of doing that:

There are frustrations – people who lie to you, people who don't know what they are doing, films that don't turn out the way you had wanted them to – so, yes, I do understand [why Depp would consider retiring]. I always ask myself, "Well, what else could I do?" Making films has never just been a job to me, it's my life. I have some interests outside of acting – I sing and I've written books, for instance – but acting is what keeps me going, it's what I do, it gives life purpose... I'm realistic about the amount of work I can get at my age, but I take what I can, even voice-overs and narration.

Lee narrated the feature-length documentary Necessary Evil: Super-Villains of DC Comics, which was released on 25 October 2013. In 2014, he appeared in an episode of the BBC documentary series Timeshift called How to Be Sherlock Holmes: The Many Faces of a Master Detective. Lee and others who had played Sherlock Holmes discussed the character and the various interpretations of him. He appeared in a web exclusive, reading an excerpt from the Sherlock Holmes short story The Final Problem.

A month before his death, Lee had signed to star with an ensemble cast in the Danish film The 11th. One of his final performances was in Angels in Notting Hill, directed by Michael Pakleppa, an independent fantasy film about an angel trapped in London who falls in love with a human being. Lee played The Boss / Mr. President and the film premiered in the Regent Street Cinema, London on 29 October 2016.

== Music career ==
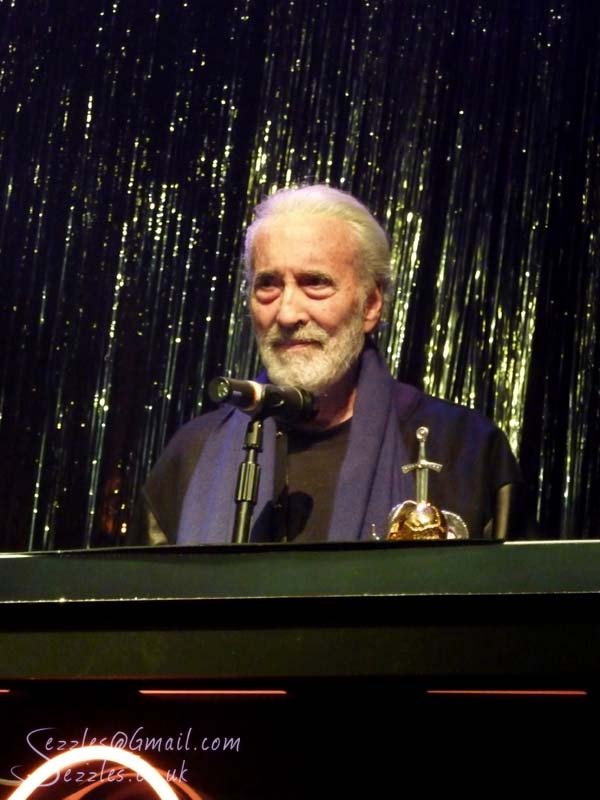
Lee receiving the "Spirit of Hammer" award for his album Charlemagne: By the Sword and the Cross at the 2010 Metal Hammer Golden Gods ceremony in London

With his operatic bass voice, Lee sang on The Wicker Man soundtrack, performing Paul Giovanni's composition, "The Tinker of Rye." He sang the closing credits song of the 1994 horror film Funny Man. In 1977, Lee appeared on Peter Knight and Bob Johnson's (from Steeleye Span) concept album The King of Elfland's Daughter.

Lee's first contact with heavy metal music came by singing a duet with Fabio Lione, lead vocalist of the Italian symphonic power metal band Rhapsody of Fire on the single "The Magic of the Wizard's Dream" from their 2004 album Symphony of Enchanted Lands II – The Dark Secret, although Lee only performs backing vocals on the album version. Later, he appeared as a narrator and backing vocalist on the band's four albums Symphony of Enchanted Lands II – The Dark Secret, Triumph or Agony, The Frozen Tears of Angels, and From Chaos to Eternity, as well as on the EP The Cold Embrace of Fear – A Dark Romantic Symphony, portraying the Wizard King. Lee worked with Manowar while they were recording a new version of their first album, Battle Hymns, replacing the original voiceover of Orson Welles, who died in 1985.

With the song "Jingle Hell," Lee entered the Billboard Hot Singles Sales chart at No. 22, thus becoming the second oldest living performer to ever enter the music charts, at 91 years and 6 months. After media attention, the song rose to No. 18. as Lee became the oldest person to have a top 20 hit.

Lee released a third EP of covers in May 2014, called Metal Knight, to celebrate his 92nd birthday; in addition to a cover of "My Way," it contains "The Toreador March," inspired by the opera Carmen, and the songs "The Impossible Dream" and "I, Don Quixote" from the Don Quixote musical Man of La Mancha. Lee was inspired to record the latter songs because, "as far as I am concerned, Don Quixote is the most metal fictional character that I know." His fourth EP and third annual Christmas release came in December 2014, as Lee put out "Darkest Carols, Faithful Sing," a playful take on "Hark! The Herald Angels Sing." He explained: "It's light-hearted, joyful and fun... At my age, the most important thing for me is to keep active by doing things that I truly enjoy. I do not know how long I am going to be around, so every day is a celebration, and I want to share it with my fans."

Lee is featured in the symphonic metal album Charlemagne: By the Sword and the Cross in 2010, after having previously worked on metal projects. The heavy metal follow-up Charlemagne: The Omens of Death was released in 2013 on Lee's 91st birthday. He was honoured with the "Spirit of Hammer" award at the 2010 Metal Hammer Golden Gods Awards ceremony; when presented the award by Tony Iommi, Lee jokingly apologized to Saxon for his song "Massacre of the Saxons", and thanked the audience for listening to "a young man right at the beginning of his career". On the self-titled debut album by Hollywood Vampires, a supergroup consisting of Johnny Depp, Alice Cooper and Joe Perry, Lee is featured as a narrator in the track "The Last Vampire." Recorded shortly before his death, this marks Lee's final appearance on a musical record. In 2019, Rhapsody of Fire included a posthumous narration on their new album, The Eighth Mountain, where Lee narrated the concept story of the band's Nephilim Empire Saga.

== Personal life ==
=== Family and relationships ===
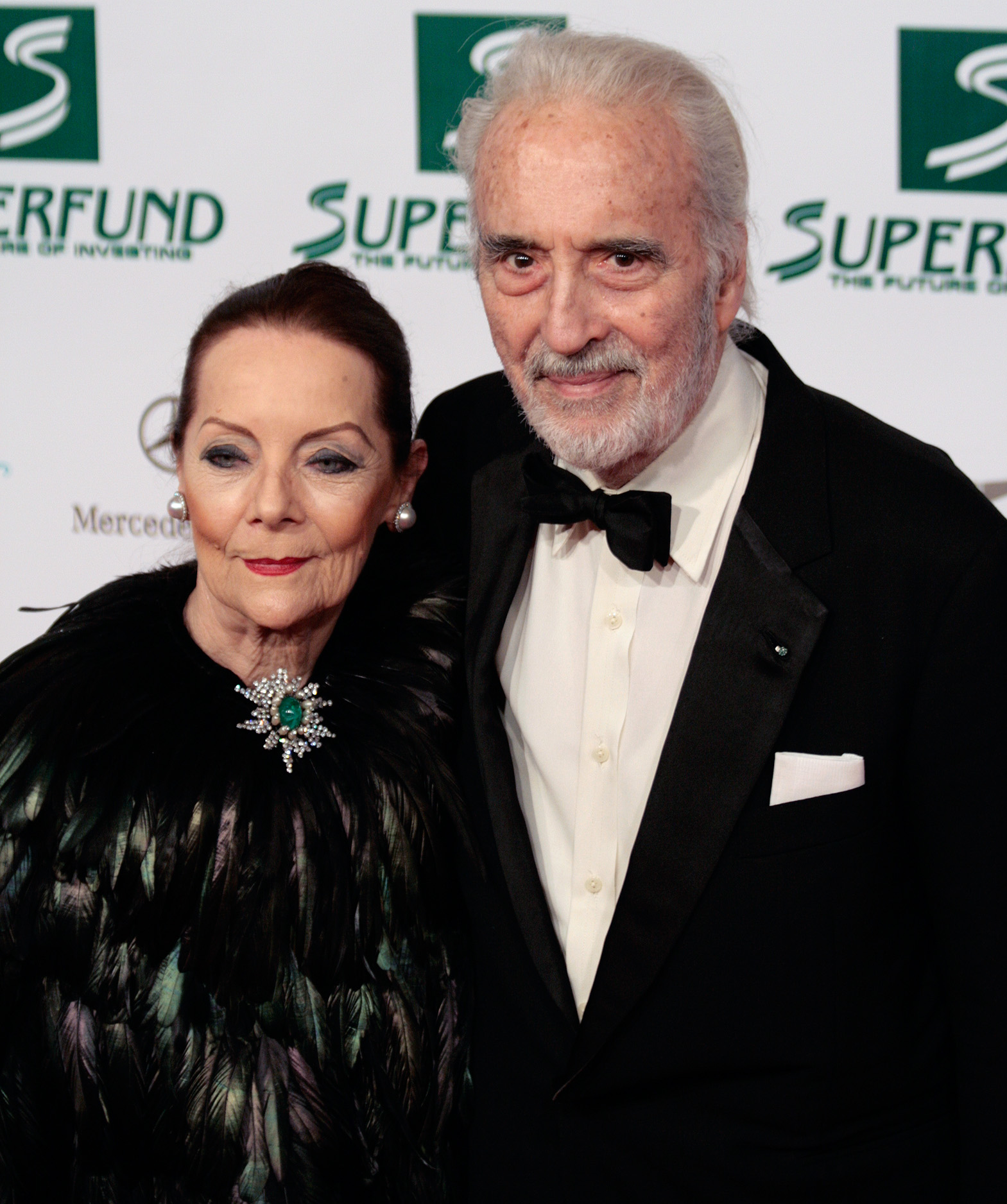
Lee with his wife, Birgit Krøncke, in March 2009

The Carandinis, Lee's maternal ancestors, were given the right to bear the coat of arms of the Holy Roman Empire by the Emperor Frederick Barbarossa.

In the late 1950s, Lee was engaged to Countess Henriette Ewa Agnes von Rosen, whom he had met at a nightclub in Stockholm. Her father, Count Fritz von Rosen, proved demanding, getting them to delay the wedding for a year, asking his London-based friends to interview Lee, hiring private detectives to investigate him, and asking Lee to provide him with references, which Lee obtained from Douglas Fairbanks Jr., John Boulting, and Joe Jackson. Lee found the meeting of her extended family to be like something from a surrealist Luis Buñuel film, and thought they were "killing me with cream." Finally, Lee needed the permission of King Gustaf VI of Sweden to marry. Lee had met him some years before while filming Tales of Hans Anderson, thus he received his blessing. Shortly before the wedding, Lee ended the engagement. He was concerned that his financial insecurity in his chosen profession meant that von Rosen "deserved better" than being "pitched into the dishevelled world of an actor." She understood, and they called the wedding off.

Lee was introduced to the Danish painter and former model Birgit "Gitte" Krøncke (1935–2024) by a Danish friend in 1960. They were engaged soon after and married on 17 March 1961. They had a daughter, Christina Erika Carandini Lee, born in 1963. Lee and his daughter provided spoken vocals on Rhapsody of Fire's album Triumph or Agony (2006) and EP The Cold Embrace of Fear – A Dark Romantic Symphony (2010).

Lee was the uncle of the English actress Harriet Walter. He moved to Los Angeles in the 1970s after becoming disillusioned with film roles he was being offered in Britain and stated that in Hollywood, "I was no longer a horror star. I was an actor." Lee subsequently moved back to England and lived with his family in Cadogan Square in Knightsbridge, central London until his death.

=== Physical characteristics and beliefs ===
Lee was known for his imposing height of 6 feet 4 inches (1.93 m).

Lee and his wife Birgit were listed among the "fifty best-dressed over 50s" by The Guardian in March 2013.

Politically, Lee supported the Conservative Party and favoured Michael Howard for leader following its defeat in the 2001 general election.

Lee was an Anglo-Catholic Christian. Following the Second World War, he was an altar server at St Stephen's Church in South Kensington, London, during T. S. Eliot's period as a parishioner there.

It was once erroneously reported Lee had a library of occult literature that amounted to 20,000 books. During a talk at University College Dublin, Lee confirmed that he did not have such a collection and said, "Somebody wrote that I had 20,000 books. I don't—I'd have to live in a bath!" Lee then said he owned only four or five such books. Lee cautioned the audience against involving themselves in occult practices, saying: "I have met people who claim to be Satanists, who claim to be involved with black magic, who claimed that they not only knew a lot about it. But as I said, I certainly have not been involved and I warn all of you: never, never, never. You will not only lose your mind: you lose your soul."

== Death ==
Christopher is truly a force to be reckoned with. Doing a scene with him and having him peering down at you, screaming into your face, all you can think of is 'My God, that's Dracula!'

— Johnny Depp, who worked with Lee in five Tim Burton films, from Sleepy Hollow in 1999 to Dark Shadows in 2012.

Lee died of heart failure at the Chelsea and Westminster Hospital on 7 June 2015, aged 93. His wife delayed the public announcement until 11 June, informing his family of the death before releasing the news to the press.

Following Lee's death, fans, friends, actors, directors, and others involved in the film industry publicly gave their personal tributes. Prime Minister David Cameron praised Lee as a "titan of the golden age of cinema." He was honoured by the Academy at the 88th Academy Awards on 28 February 2016 in the annual In Memoriam section.

Lee's widow, Gitte, died on 20 June 2024, aged 89.

== Honours and legacy ==
Lee was the subject of the BBC's This Is Your Life in 1974, where he was surprised by Eamonn Andrews. In 1994, for his influence on the horror genre, Lee received the Bram Stoker Award for Lifetime Achievement. Three years later, he was appointed a Commander of the Venerable Order of Saint John. On 16 June 2001, as part of that year's Queen's Birthday Honours, Lee was appointed a Commander of the Order of the British Empire "for services to Drama." He was made a Knight Bachelor "For services to Drama and to Charity" on 13 June as part of the Queen's Birthday Honours in 2009. The French government made Lee a Commander of Ordre des Arts et des Lettres in 2011.

Lee was named 2005's "most marketable star in the world" in a USA Today newspaper poll, after three of the films he appeared in grossed US$640 million. In 2010, Lee was identified as the IMDb member with the greatest closeness centrality, implying he was the best-connected person in the business.

In 2008, Lee, in his role as Count Dracula, was featured on a commemorative UK postage stamp issued by the Royal Mail to mark 50 years since the release of Dracula (1958) by Hammer Films. Two years later, Lee received the Spirit of Hammer award at the Metal Hammer Golden Gods Awards, for his contribution to the metal genre. In 2011, Lee was awarded a BAFTA Fellowship; he received a BFI Fellowship in 2013.

In 2011, accompanied by his wife Birgit, and on the 164th anniversary of the birth of Bram Stoker, Lee was honoured with a tribute by University College Dublin, and described his honorary life membership of the UCD Law Society as "in some ways as special as the Oscars". Lee was awarded the Bram Stoker Gold Medal by the Trinity College Philosophical Society, of which Stoker had been president, and a copy of Collected Ghost Stories of MR James by Trinity College's School of English.

== Arms ==
Coat of arms of Sir Christopher Lee
Notes Arms as found in his autobiographies. It is to be noted that they are the arms of the Carandini. Escutcheon Argent, on a chevron Azure, two ears of wheat Or, a demi lion in base of the Last, on a chief of the Third, an eagle Sable, crowned Or.

== Works ==
=== Books ===
- Christopher Lee's X Certificate, London: Star Books, 1975. Hardcover reprint, Christopher Lee's 'X' Certificate edited by Christopher Lee and Michel Parry, London: W. H. Allen, 1976. US retitled reprint in paperback as From the Archives of Evil, New York: Warner Books, 1976.
- Christopher Lee's Archives of Evil, London: Mayflower paperback, 1975. Hardcover reprint as Archives of Evil presented by Christopher Lee and Michel Parry. London: W. H. Allen, 1977. US retitled reprint in paperback as From the Archives of Evil 2, New York: Warner Books, 1976.
- Christopher Lee's Omnibus of Evil, London: Mayflower paperback, 1975; reprint 1980). Retitled hardcover reprint as The Great Villains: An Omnibus of Evil, presented by Christopher Lee and Michel Parry. London: W. H. Allen, 1978.

Note: Lee was a 'ghost-editor' on the above series, which was edited by the anthologist Michel Parry.

- Tall, Dark and Gruesome. (autobiography). London: W. H. Allen, 1977. Expanded retitled edition as Lord of Misrule: The Autobiography of Christopher Lee. London: Orion Books, 2003, with an introduction by Peter Jackson.

=== Audiobooks ===
- William Peter Blatty: The Exorcist (abridged)
- Agatha Christie: The Hound of Death and Other Stories (unabridged)
- Sir Arthur Conan Doyle: The Adventure of the Lion's Mane and Other Stories (unabridged short stories)
- Sir Arthur Conan Doyle: The Adventure of the Sussex Vampire and Other Stories (unabridged short stories)
- Sir Arthur Conan Doyle: The Case-Book of Sherlock Holmes (unabridged short stories)
- Sir Arthur Conan Doyle: The Valley of Fear (abridged)
- James Herbert: The Fog (abridged)
- Victor Hugo: The Hunchback of Notre Dame (abridged)
- Gaston Leroux: The Phantom of the Opera (abridged)
- Sir Walter Scott: Ivanhoe (abridged)
- Mary Shelley: Frankenstein (abridged)
- Robert Louis Stevenson: Strange Case of Dr Jekyll and Mr Hyde (abridged)
- Bram Stoker: Dracula (abridged)
- J. R. R. Tolkien: The Children of Húrin (unabridged)
- Dennis Wheatley: The Devil Rides Out (unabridged)
- Dennis Wheatley: Strange Conflict (unabridged)

=== Discography ===
==== Albums ====
- Christopher Lee Sings Devils, Rogues & Other Villains (1998)
- Revelation (2006)
- Charlemagne: By the Sword and the Cross (2010)
- Charlemagne: The Omens of Death (2013)

==== EPs ====
- A Heavy Metal Christmas (2012)
- A Heavy Metal Christmas Too (2013)
- Metal Knight (2014)

==== Singles ====
- "Let Legend Mark Me as the King" (2012)
- "The Ultimate Sacrifice" (2012)
- "Jingle Hell" (2013): number 18 on the Billboard Hot Singles Sales, thus becoming the second oldest living performer to ever enter the music charts, at 91 years and 6 months.
- "Darkest Carols, Faithful Sing" (2014)

==== Rhapsody of Fire guest appearances ====
- Symphony of Enchanted Lands II – The Dark Secret (2004), as narrator and the Wizard King
- Triumph or Agony (2006), as narrator and the Wizard King
- The Frozen Tears of Angels (2010), as narrator and the Wizard King
- The Cold Embrace of Fear – A Dark Romantic Symphony (2010), as narrator and the Wizard King
- From Chaos to Eternity (2011), as narrator and the Wizard King
- The Eighth Mountain (2019), as narrator (Posthumous release)

==== Other guest appearances ====
- The Avengers episode "Never, never say die" (1967)
- The Wicker Man soundtrack (1973)
- Hammer Presents "Dracula" With Christopher Lee (EMI NTS 186 UK/Capitol ST-11340 USA, 1974)
- Space: 1999 episode "Earthbound" (1975)
- Charlie's Angels (US TV series) episode "Angel in Hiding" (1980)
- The Soldier's Tale by Stravinsky, with the Scottish Chamber Orchestra conducted by Lionel Friend (Nimbus, 1986)
- Peter and the Wolf by Prokofiev, with the English String Orchestra conducted by Yehudi Menuhin (Nimbus, 1989)
- Annie Get Your Gun (1995)
- The Rocky Horror Show (1995)
- The King and I (1998)
- Musicality of Lerner and Loewe (2002)
- At Dawn in Rivendell (2003), The Tolkien Ensemble
- Leaving Rivendell (2005), The Tolkien Ensemble
- Edgar Allan Poe Projekt – Visionen (2006), recites the poem "The Raven" and sings the song "Elenore"
- Battle Hymns MMXI (2010), Manowar album
- Fearless (2013)
- Hollywood Vampires (2015)

== See also ==
- The Life and Deaths of Christopher Lee, a 2024 documentary film about him

== Bibliography ==
- Aknin, Laurent (2011). Sir Christopher Lee. Paris: Nouveau Monde Éditions.
- Daniels, Anthony (2019). I Am C-3PO: The Inside Story (Hardback ed.). London: DK. ISBN 9780241357606.
- Jones, Russ; Drucker, Mort (illus.) (1966). Christopher Lee's Treasury of Terror. Pyramid Books.
- Lee, Christopher (2003) [1977]. Lord of Misrule: The Autobiography of Christopher Lee. London: Orion Publishing Group. ISBN 978-0-7528-5770-1.
- Mosley, Stephen (2022). Christopher Lee: The Loneliness of Evil. Midnight Marquee Press. ISBN 978-1-64430-128-9.
- Pohle, Robert W.; Hart, Douglas C.; Baldwin, Rita Pohle (2017). The Christopher Lee Film Encyclopedia. Rowman & Littlefield. p. 329. ISBN 978-0-8108-9270-5.
- Rigby, Jonathan (2001). Christopher Lee: The Authorised Screen History. Reynolds & Hearn.
- Stanzick, Nicolas (2010). Dans les griffes de la Hammer. Paris: Le Bord de l'eau Editions.
