= Riot Squad (band) =

English punk rock band

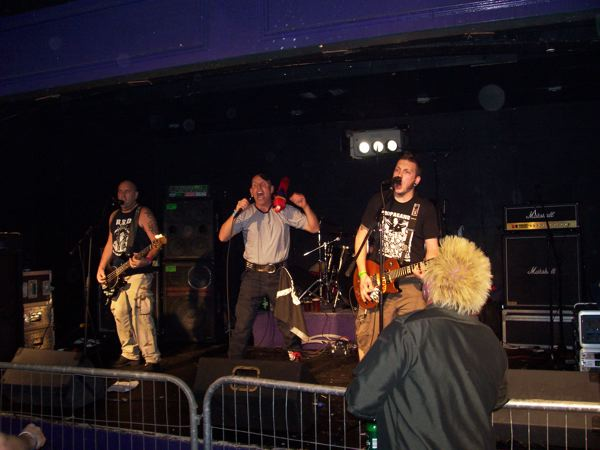
- Performing at the Wasted Farewell Party, Carlton, Morecambe, October 2006

Background information
- Origin: Mansfield, England, UK
- Genres: Punk rock
- Years active: 1981–1984; 2003–present
- Members: Paul "Pommi" Palmer, Chiz Shakespeare, Luke Shaw, Mick "Shakey" Shakespeare, Pete Bounds
- Past members: Duncan "Dunk" Mason; Nigel "Nello" Nelson; Paul "Pommi" Palmer; Wayne Butler; Staz; Chedd; Lee Butler; Rick Williams; Baz Barrett (2 Live Shows as guest bassist)

Riot Squad were an English second-wave punk rock band from Mansfield, England, initially active between 1981 and 1984.

== History ==
Riot Squad formed in 1981, with an initial line-up of Duncan "Dunk" Mason (vocals), Nigel "Nello" Nelson (guitar), and Paul "Pommi" Palmer (drums), Nelson the only one of the three with any musical experience. They were inspired by a John Peel documentary which discussed how Desperate Bicycles took a DIY approach and decided that they could do the same. Two weeks after forming the band, they played their first gig at the King Of Diamonds pub in the mining village of Shirebrook, Derbyshire Langwith Junction, followed a few weeks later by a gig at a local Working Mens Club, which had to be interrupted halfway through to allow the audience to play bingo. Wayne Butler saw the band perform that night and offered to join as the band's bass player. The band began playing further afield and with money borrowed from Dunk's father recorded their first demo, Religion Doesn't Mean a Thing in a basement studio in Mansfield. Dunk set up Rot Records, initially as a cassette-only label, and sold the demo at shows and via mail order to try to recoup the recording costs, eventually selling 1,500 copies. On the strength of the demo, the band were signed to Rondelet Records, who issued the band's first single, "Fuck The Tories", which reached number 23 on the UK Indie Chart in August 1982, and reached the top 100 of the UK Singles Chart. Nello was replaced by 'Staz', and Rondelet re-issued the band's Religion... demo as their second EP. After a UK tour, Staz left the band, with Butler moving to guitar, and 'Chedd' recruited on bass. The Rondelet label folded, prompting Dunk to turn Rot into a proper label, releasing the next three Riot Squad singles, although he stepped down as singer, being replaced briefly by Rick Williams and then Butler's brother Lee. In early 1984, the band released "There Ain't No Solution", but musical differences within the band would cause them to split that year. Dunk compiled the Rot singles and a few unreleased tracks on the No Potential Threat album, which reached number 13 on the indie chart.

Dunk continued to run Rot Records until the label's distributor, Red Rhino went bankrupt.

The band's records became highly collectible in the years that followed, with Anagram Records releasing a CD compilation, The Complete Punk Collection in 1995.

Riot Squad re-formed in 2004.

In January 2006, drummer Paul Pommi Palmer and bassist Ched recruited two new members: young guitarist Luke, who was 15 years their junior, and a new front-man in the form of Chiz (ex Septic Psychos and Dead Meat). The new line-up was well met and played a number of dates across the country as well as Europe. The new line-up had a sharper edge and played faster and were much tighter. They entered the studio in November 2006 to record their first album in over 20 years. Persecute the Weak, Control the Strong was released in March 2007 and was voted Punk Album of the Year 2007 by Fungal Punk.

One of the tracks, "Violence on the Streets", featured on US label 272 Records Punk Kills Vol 1 in late 2007.

Only six months after the album's release, Ched called it a day. He was Mansfield's Champion Plate Spinner for five years running and planned to go pro. This would naturally take up a great deal of time so something had to give. He was replaced by Mick, twin brother of Chiz (and also of the same previous bands). Mick soon swapped became guitarist to make way for Pete, who would take up the bass. In the interim and as a stand in for just two shows, as support to The Epoxies, Baz Barrett (Consumed, Fat Wreck Chords), not being one to turn down the chance to be part of one of his favourite bands of his teen years, joined the fold with just two hours of rehearsals. Baz also handled the sleeve design and layout of Persecute The Weak, Control The Strong.

The band released an international 7" split on their own label (Suicide Circle) in 2008 with The Crack Babies (Sweden), The Undertakers (Belgium) and Human Battle (Greece). This was followed up with a gig in Athens early in January 2009. The band also helped bring The Undertakers over to the UK.

Riot Squad played their last gig at Rebellion Festival 2009.

== Discography ==
Chart placings shown are from the UK Indie Chart.

=== Singles/EPs ===
- Religion Doesn't Mean a Thing (1981) Rot (demo tape)
- "Fuck The Tories" (1982) Rondelet (#23)
- "Riot In The City" (1982) Rondelet
- Don't Be Denied EP (1983) Rot (#39)
- I'm OK, Fuck You EP (1983) Rot (#11)
- There Ain't No Solution (1984) Rot (#22)

=== Albums ===
- No Potential Threat (1984) Rot (#13)
- The Complete Punk Collection (1995) Anagram

- Persecute the Weak, Control the Strong (2007) Suicide Circle Records

== Appearances on compilations ==
- Police Power appeared on Pax Records Punk Compilation (year unknown)
- Society's Fodder and Lost Cause appeared on 100% Hardcore Punk (1998) Captain Oi
- Violence On The Streets appeared on Punk Kills Vol.1 (2007) 272 Records, CA, US
- Speed Cameras appeared on Angry Scenes Vol. 3 (2008) Angry Scenes Records, UK
