= Destination Set to Nowhere =

Studio album by Vision Divine
- Released: 14 September 2012 (Europe); 18 September 2012 (North America)
- Recorded: March-May 2012
- Genres: Progressive metal Power metal
- Length: 51:12
- Labels: earMUSIC; Armoury Records
- Producer: Olaf Thörsen

Vision Divine chronology
9 Degrees West Of The Moon (2009)	Destination Set to Nowhere (2012)	When All the Heroes Are Dead (2019)

Professional ratings
Review scores
Source	Rating
Blistering	8.5/10 stars

Destination Set to Nowhere is a concept album by the Italian progressive power metal band Vision Divine. Released through earMUSIC on September 14, 2012, it is the band's seventh studio album and the final album to feature vocalist Fabio Lione. Destination Set to Nowhere has a futuristic concept and its story takes place in outer space. It follows the journey of a group of like-minded people who because of political and economical injustices escape the planet earth and set out to search for a new planet to start a better life there.

== Story ==
A man (later known as the commander) who is disgusted with the world he’s living in decides to escape the earth and leave it to the greedy and power hungry politicians who have caused him his despair. He builds a huge spaceship and names it Elpis after the ancient Goddess of hope and along with some like-minded men and women sets out into space on a quest to find a new planet where they can start a new life and build it the way the want. After years of roaming the space, they finally find a perfect planet which looks like heaven to them and land on it. But not even a year has passed since their arrival that they too start to get greedy and act like the same politicians they left on earth, trying to get more power over one another. All these upset the commander and he decides to leave again. He returns to his spaceship Elpis alone and starts it, but he doesn’t set any route, his destination is set to nowhere.

== The Bonus CD ==
Olaf Thörsen stated: "Edel was so happy about the final result with the new master they had, that they called us back and asked us about the chance to release a sort of “limited edition” to be released with the new album, which could include some old songs taken from our previous albums. They would also have liked the songs to have the same production of the new album, so we should have re-recorded them. Of course we accepted, and we also decide to include “Gutter Ballet”, which is a song we all love and played in the past. We always released a cover, as that’s our last way to still feel like “fans”, and this time it was just the turn of Savatage".

== Track listing ==
All lyrics are written by Olaf Thörsen except where noted; all music is composed by Olaf Thörsen (Magnani), Fabio Lione (Tordiglione) and Alessio Lucatti.

No.	Title	Lyrics	Length
1.	"S'i Fosse Foco" (spoken part by Leonardo Patrignani)	lyrics taken from "S'i' fosse foco" by Cecco Angiolieri (1260-1312)	01:50
2.	"The Dream Maker"		05:03
3.	"Beyond the Sun and Far Away"		03:58
4.	"The Ark"		05:42
5.	"Mermaids from Their Moons"		05:23
6.	"The Lighthouse"		04:38
7.	"Message to Home"		06:17
8.	"The House of the Angels"		05:11
9.	"The Sin is You"		04:38
10.	"Here We Die"		04:15
11.	"Destination Set to Nowhere"		04:17
Total length:			51:12

The limited edition of Destination Set to Nowhere includes a second CD entitled “Best Of” which contains the re-recorded songs from the band's previous albums.

No.	Title	Music	Length
1.	"New Eden" (from the 1999 album Vision Divine)	Magnani/Tordiglione	4:01
2.	"Vision Divine" (from the 1999 album Vision Divine)	Magnani/Tordiglione	5:02
3.	"Send Me An Angel" (from the 2001 album Send Me an Angel)	Magnani/Tordiglione	4:17
4.	"Taste Of A Goodbye" (from the 2001 album Send Me an Angel)	Magnani/Tordiglione	3:42
5.	"The Fallen Feather" (from the 2004 album Stream of Consciousness)	Magnani/Tordiglione/Smirnoff	6:21
6.	"La Vita Fugge" (from the 2004 album Stream of Consciousness)	Magnani/Tordiglione/Smirnoff	4:43
7.	"The Perfect Machine" (from the 2005 album The Perfect Machine)	Magniani/Luppi/Smirnoff	6:37
8.	"God Is Dead" (from the 2005 album The Perfect Machine)	Magniani/Luppi/Smirnoff	5:23
9.	"The 25th Hour" (from the 2007 album The 25th Hour)	Magniani/Luppi	5:27
10.	"Voices" (from the 2007 album The 25th Hour)	Magniani/Luppi	5:37
11.	"Gutter Ballet" (Savatage cover)	Oliva/Oliva/O'Neill	6:34

== Credits ==
- Fabio Lione - Vocals
- Olaf Thörsen - Guitars
- Federico Puleri - Guitars
- Andrea "Tower" Torricini - Bass
- Alessio Lucatti - Keyboards, Piano
- Alessandro Bissa - Drums
