= Beto Vázquez Infinity =

Beto Vazquez Infinity
- Origin: Buenos Aires, Argentina
- Genre: Symphonic power metal
- Years active: 2000–present
- Label: BVM
- Website: http://www.betovazquezinfinity.com.ar/

Beto Vazquez Infinity is an Argentine heavy metal project from Buenos Aires led by Alberto 'Beto' Vazquez. Formed in 2000, the outfit has released seven studio albums and a live DVD. Vazquez uses a large number guests on his records, while he occasionally plays live with a six-piece band.

== Career ==
Vazquez was a member of metal band Nepal, which folded in 2000. Looking for a different outlet, he composed a demo in September 1999 and offered it to his record label Nems Enterprises. They gave him a record deal, but suggested the use of guest vocalists who sang in English to facilitate a worldwide release. Vazquez wrote and produced all the songs, which featured performances by Tarja Turunen, Candice Night, Sabine Edelsbacher and Fabio Lione. The self-titled album was released in South America in March 2001 and throughout the world a year later. He toured the album with a six-piece band that made its international debut at the Viña Rock festival in Spain. They also supported slots others, including Nightwish, Labyrinth, Vision Divine, Angra and Tierra Santa. Towards the end of 2002, the Wizard EP was released, containing different versions and outtakes.

In 2006, Beto Vazquez released a second studio album, Flying Towards the New Horizon, his own label, BVM Records. It included guest appearances by Antti Raili (Celesty), Aldo Lonobile (Secret Sphere) and Sonia Pineault (Forgotten Tales). The album release was limited to Argentina. Two years later, the album Darkmind appeared on the same label, featuring Olaf Thorsen (Vision Divine – Labyrinth), Sandra Schleret (Elis), Marcela Bovio (Stream of Passion) and Manda Ophuis (Nemesea). In 2010, on the tenth anniversary of the project, Beto Vazquez released the double album Existence. It featured twenty guest musicians, including Timo Tolkki (ex Stratovarius), Dominique Leurquin (Rhapsody of Fire), Alfred Romero (Dark Moor) and Jacob Jansen (Anubis Gate). In December 2012, Vazquez released the Beyond Space Without Limits album, featured guest musicians from Argentina Opera such as Dario Schmunck, Santiago Bürgi, and many others guest musicians. It included a bonus disc with eight cover versions.

== Live ==
After a number of years as a studio project, Vazquez assembled a six-piece band to play live shows in 2011. Since then, they have played support for Sirenia and featured at The Roxy Live and Metal para Todos. One highlight was supporting the band Yes at the Luna Park Stadium in 2013. On March 12, 2014, the DVD Live in Buenos Aires was released, produced by Vazquez, and recorded in November 2013.

== Members ==
=== Current ===
- Beto Vazquez - Bass guitar, rhythm guitar, acoustic guitar, programming, orchestral arrangements
- Leonardo Lukaszewicz - Lead guitar, acoustic guitar.
- Daiana Benitez - Keyboards, lead & backing vocals.
- Guillermo Carpintero - Drums, percussion.
- Melani Hess - Lead & backing vocals.

== Discography ==
=== Albums ===
- Beto Vázquez Infinity (2001)
- Flying Towards the New Horizon (2006)
- Darkmind (2008)
- Existence (2010)
- Beyond Space Without Limits (2012)
- Humanity (2018)
- Mental Asylum (2021)

=== DVD ===
- Live in Buenos Aires (2014)
- 15 Years Alive

=== EPs ===
- Battle of Valmourt (Promo) -MCD- (2000)
- Wizard (2001)
