= Lione/Conti =

Studio album by Lione/Conti
- Released: 26 January 2018
- Genre: Power metal; progressive metal; symphonic metal
- Length: 44:53
- Label: Frontiers
- Producer: Simone Mularoni

Fabio Lione chronology
Into the Legend (w/ Rhapsody of Fire) (2016)	Lione/Conti (2018)	Ømni (w/ Angra (2018)

Alessandro Conti chronology
Rabbits' Hill, Pt. 2 (w/ Trick or Treat) (2016)	Lione/Conti (2018)	Re-Animated (w/ Trick or Treat) (2018)

Lione/Conti is a collaborative album by Italian power metal singers Fabio Lione (Angra, Turilli / Lione Rhapsody, ex-Rhapsody of Fire, ex-Vision Divine, ex-Labyrinth) and Alessandro Conti (Trick or Treat, Luca Turilli's Rhapsody) under the moniker Lione/Conti. It was released through Frontiers Records on 26 January 2018 (one source says 18 January.). The project was conceived by Frontiers's president Serafino Perugino, who was willing to create an Italian version of the label's Allen/Lande partnership. The album was written and produced by Simone Mularoni (DGM).

== Track listing ==
All tracks are written by Simone Mularoni

No.	Title	Lead vocals	Length
1.	"Ascencion"	Fabio Lione, Alessandro Conti	4:41
2.	"Outcome"	Lione, Conti	4:18
3.	"You're Falling"	Lione, Conti	4:51
4.	"Somebody Else"	Lione, Conti	5:21
5.	"Misbeliever"	Conti	4:07
6.	"Destruction Show"	Lione	4:32
7.	"Glories"	Lione, Conti	4:24
8.	"Truth"	Lione, Conti	5:07
9.	"Gravity"	Conti	4:36
10.	"Crosswinds"	Lione	3:56
Total length:			44:53

== Personnel ==
- Fabio Lione - lead vocals
- Alessandro Conti - lead vocals
- Simone Mularoni - guitars, bass
- Filippo Martignano - keyboards
- Marco Lanciotti - drums

== Critical reception ==
Professional ratings
Review scores
Source	Rating
Metal Hammer Italia	76/100

Writing for Metal Hammer Italia, Dario Cattaneo praised the album's overall quality, but criticized it for sounding too similar to bands such as Kamelot and DGM itself instead of the bombastic symphonic epic metal the two vocalists are more associated with.
