= Trick or Treat (band) =

Italian power metal band

- Origin: Modena, Italy
- Genres: Power metal
- Years active: 2002–present
- Label: Valery Records
- Members: Alessandro Conti; Guido Benedetti; Luca Venturelli; Leone Villani Conti; Dario Capacci
- Past members: Nicola Tomei; Mirko Virdis; Luca Cabri; Luca Setti
- Website: trickortreatband.com

Trick or Treat is an Italian power metal band formed in 2002 in Modena. The group's line-up has been mostly the same since its inception, except for the drummer position, which underwent changes in 2006 and 2011, and in 2014 guitarist and founding member Luca Cabri left the band and was replaced by Luca Venturelli.

So far, they have released nine studio albums.

== History ==
The band started in 2002 as a Helloween tribute band. After some years performing in clubs around Italy, they recorded a four-track demo (Like Donald Duck) and signed a deal with Valery Records, through which they have released their debut album in 2005, Evil Needs Candy Too. A subsequent tour was started, with shows in Europe and USA. In the meanwhile, Mirko Virdis substituted Luca Tomei at the drums.

In 2008 Trick or Treat recorded their second album, Tin Soldiers, featuring former Helloween singer Michael Kiske and former Vision Divine vocalist Michele Luppi. The album reached the 260th position in the Japanese charts.

In 2010 Trick or Treat were chosen via internet pool as part of the "emergent section" of the Italian Gods of Metal festival.

Between December 2010 and January 2011, the band opened several of the dates of the European leg of The 7 Sinners World Tour 2010/2011, with Helloween and Stratovarius.

On 26 November 2012, they released their third album, Rabbits' Hill, Pt 1, with guest performances of Andre Matos (Viper, Avantasia, ex-Angra, ex-Symfonia), Fabio Dessi (Arthemis), Damnagoras (Elvenking) and Maurizio (Folkstone). The album is a concept album inspired by Richard Adams' novel Watership Down. In October 2014, guitarist and founding member Luca Cabri left the band for personal reasons; he was subsequently replaced by Luca Venturelli, from Mad Maze. In 2016, they released the second part of the story started in their third album: Rabbits' Hill, Pt 2, with guest performances of Sara Squadrani (Ancient Bards), Tim "Ripper" Owens (ex-Judas Priest, ex-Iced Earth, ex-Yngwie Malmsteen) and Tony Kakko (Sonata Arctica).

On 7 March 2020 former drummer Mirko Virdis died at age 38 after crashing his car in Formigine. On 28 April of the same year, they released their fifth all-original studio album, The Legend of the XII Saints, containing songs inspired by Saint Seiya and based on each of the Zodiac signs.

In January 2022, they announced their seventh studio album, Creepy Symphonies, which should be released on 1 April. The first, self-titled single was released on 28 February.

== Band members ==
=== Current ===
- Alessandro Conti – vocals (2002–present)
- Guido Benedetti – guitar (2002–present)
- Luca Venturelli – guitar (2014–present)
- Leone Villani Conti – bass (2002–present)
- Dario Capacci – drums (2023–present)

=== Former ===
- Luca Cabri – guitar (2002–2014)
- Nicola Tomei – drums (2002–2006)
- Mirko Virdis – drums (2006–2011; died 2020)
- Luca Setti – drums (2011–2023)

== Discography ==
=== Tribute ===
- 2003 – Italian Helloween Tribute

=== Demo ===
- 2004 – Like Donald Duck

=== Studio albums ===
- Evil Needs Candy Too (2006)
- Tin Soldiers (2009)
- Rabbits' Hill, Pt. 1 (2012)
- Rabbits' Hill, Pt. 2 (2016)
- Re-Animated (2018)
- The Legend of the XII Saints (2020)
- The Unlocked Songs (2021)
- Creepy Symphonies (2022)
- Ghosted (2025)

=== Singles ===
- 2009 – "Paper Dragon"
- 2010 – "Robin Hood (Italian anime theme)"
- 2010 – "David Gnomo" feat. Elvenking
- 2011 – "Heavy Metal Bunga Bunga"
- 2022 – "Creepy Symphony"
