= Manifiesto (Nepal album) =

Studio album by Nepal
- Released: 1997
- Recorded: 1997
- Genre: Thrash metal
- Length: 53:52
- Label: Nems

Nepal chronology
| Ideología (1995) | Manifiesto (1997) |

Manifiesto is the third album by Argentinean thrash metal band Nepal that was mostly recorded and mixed at El Zoológico studios. This was released under Nems Enterprises in Argentina, and Rock Brigade Records in Brazil. This Nepal album has the collaboration of many notorious musicians such as Ricardo Iorio, André Matos, George Biddle, Kiko Loureiro, Martin Walkyier and Hansi Kursch.

Manifiesto was recorded with Holophonics 3D Sound system, made and developed by the engineer Hugo Zuccarelli. With this technology, the audience can experience the sound three-dimensionally: listening to the album gives the impression of hearing the vocals and the instruments from outside, like in reality. This technology has been utilized by bands and musicians like Pink Floyd, YES, Roger Waters, Vangelis, Steve Vai and Paul McCartney.

The concerts for the release of their new album started in January 1998. In April, the band played as support for the band Moonspell. On 22 August, they did so for Blind Guardian in Buenos Aires at "Cemento". The same year they participated in the "Metal Rock Festival II".

== Track listing ==
1. "La Saga" - 01:45
2. "Perfil Siniestro" - 03:40
3. "Besando La Tierra" - 05:41
4. "Más Allá Del Asfalto" - 04:22
5. "Children of the Grave (Black Sabbath cover)" - 05:16
6. "Lukumi" - 02:42
7. "Estadio Chico" - 04:12
8. "Lanzado Al Mundo Hoy (V8 cover)" - 03:35
9. "Nadaísmo" - 05:42
10. "Ciegos de Poder" - 05:00
11. "Besando La Tierra (second version)" - 11:52
