= 9 Degrees West of the Moon =

Studio album by Vision Divine
- Released: 23 January 2009
- Recorded: Aug – Nov 2008
- Genres: Progressive metal, power metal
- Length: 54:39
- Label: Frontiers Records
- Producer: Timo Tolkki

Vision Divine chronology
The 25th Hour (2007)	9 Degrees West of the Moon (2009)	Destination Set to Nowhere (2012)

9 Degrees West of the Moon is the sixth studio album by the Italian progressive power metal band Vision Divine. It was released in 2009. The album marks the return of the singer Fabio Lione after the departure of Michele Luppi.

== Track listing ==
No.	Title	Length
1.	"Letter To My Child Never Born"	8:56
2.	"Violet Loneliness"	4:42
3.	"Fading Shadow"	5:20
4.	"Angels In Disguise"	5:16
5.	"The Killing Speed Of Time"	4:50
6.	"The Streets Of Laudomia"	5:50
7.	"Fly"	4:53
8.	"Out In Open Space"	5:08
9.	"9 Degrees West Of The Moon" (voice (spoken part) – Anne Catherine Wedel)	3:56
10.	"A Touch Of Evil" (Judas Priest cover)	5:48
Total length:		54:39

Japanese edition bonus track
No.	Title	Length
11.	"Fading Shadow (Demo Version)"	5:17
Total length:		59:56

== Personnel ==
- Fabio Lione – vocals
- Olaf Thörsen – guitars
- Federico Puleri – guitars
- Cristiano Bertocchi – bass
- Alessio Lucatti – keyboards, piano
- Alessandro Bissa – drums
- Barbara Garzoni – violin, viola
- Fausto Solci – cello
