= TERJE (musician) =

TERJE (Terje Eide)
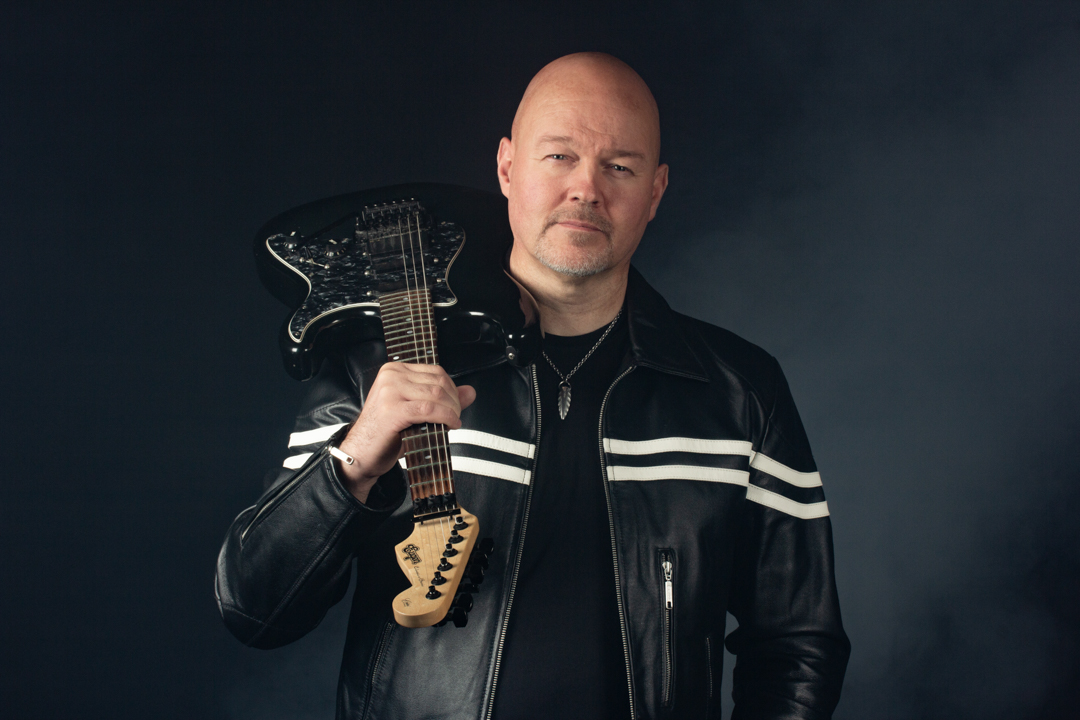
- TERJE

Background information
- Birth name: Terje Eide
- Born: 1964; Bergen, Norway
- Genres: Rock Music, Hard Rock, Melodic Rock, AOR
- Occupation(s): Musician, composer, producer, guitarist, vocalist
- Instrument(s): Guitar, vocals
- Labels: Frontiers Records, Independent.
- Member of: TERJE
- Formerly of: On The Rise
- Website: terjeeide.com

Terje Eide (born 28 February 1964), artist name TERJE, is a Norwegian vocalist, guitarist, songwriter, composer and producer from Bergen, Norway, most known for his rock band On the Rise. His critically acclaimed solo album Recalibrate was released in 2023 under the moniker TERJE.

== Career ==
=== 1982 - 2000: Career beginnings ===
TERJE first captured the public ear at age 16, as singer, guitarist and songwriter. His musical career began a year later, after winning a local talent contest. He later enjoyed a stint with the band Heaven & Hell, a rock institution in Bergen in the 1980s. In 1986 he won the Norwegian National Rock Championship on national TV NRK with the band The Heat. An active contributor to the Bergen music scene, he spent several years exploring various musical genres. This capacity landed him a variety of large-scale shows and concerts, backing renowned Norwegian artists as a guitarist, singer and backup singer.

=== 2000 - 2003: On the Rise and Frontiers Records. ===
TERJE went back to his melodic rock roots in 2000 by starting a studio project that later on became On the Rise . A demo was made in early 2001 which immediately raised the interest of Italian record label Frontiers Records who signed the project in June 2002. The self-titled debut album On the Rise was released in 2003, and was described as the melodic rock "ultimate debut" by several rock magazines. In 2009, he put together the songs on the long awaited follow up album entitled Dream Zone.

=== 2023 - present: Solo career and album Recalibrate ===
TERJE released his solo album Recalibrate on Oct.12th 2023 as an independent. He wrote and produced the album, singing all lead and background vocals, playing all guitars as well as many of the other instruments himself. Stig Ødegaard writes in a Scream Magazine review that "the fact that the artist is not affiliated with any record label speaks in his favor" and gave the album a 6 out of 6.

"As an independent, I only have my own integrity to rely on (...) artist and bands have more platforms to stand on today; they aren't as dependent on getting that record deal anymore."

- Terje Eide, 2024

According to critics, Recalibrate is "a highly diverse slick and sophisticated album, the music is often beautifully performed and synth led, yet complex showing progressive rock sign, this is not melodic rock by numbers, this is melodic rock from the soul and you can feel it vocally and musically"; "classy melodic hard rock record with a lot of musical depth. Heavier than On The Rise but no loss of melody and some surprisingly intricate tracks."; "characterized by a first-class songwriting, strong instrumentation and a powerful sound"; “the Norwegian delivers a strong AOR record with huge melodies and timeless arrangements (...) pleasant hooklines, a nice portion of solid rock and exciting songwriting". The song On Fire was praised by legendary guitarist Steve Lukather from the band Toto, calling it a "great track".

TERJE wanted his album "to have in sum an uplifting message.(...) There are a lot of ‘Re’s on this album: a prefix that implies trying something anew, with the potential for a better outcome".

== Musical style and references ==
TERJE is self-taught and has experimented with various genres throughout his career, but "Melodic Rock has been close to my heart for as long as I can remember, probably since the day I started to sing and play". His recent solo album Recalibrate is still very melodic, but with a stronger texture than before, and his guitar solos are "full of squealing histrionics".

TERJE has cited inspirations such as Van Halen, Deep Purple, Toto, Kiss, Thin Lizzy, Dio and Michael Schenker Group. In an interview with Rock it! Magazine, he lists his ultimate dream team: Simon Phillips (drums), Steve Vai on (Guitar), Marco Mendoza (Bass) and Michele Luppi (Keyboards).

== Discography ==
The Heat - Searching (Rockmønstring NRK1) (1986) Album
Help! Save Every Child (1990) Single
Jan Eggum - Nesten ikke tilstede (1993) Album
Art By Accident - Art By Accident (1993) Album
On the Rise - Beat of your heart (1993) Promo
On the Rise - On the Rise (2003) Album
Ambition - Shaping Fate and Destiny (2006) Album
On the Rise - Dream Zone (2009) Album
TERJE On Fire (2023) Single
TERJE Play It Loud (2023) Single
TERJE Recalibrate (2023) Single
TERJE Recalibrate (2023) Album
