= Ideologia =

Ideologia may refer to:

- Ideologia (Cazuza album), 1988
- Ideología, a 1995 album by Nepal band
