= Secret Sphere =

Italian symphonic power metal band

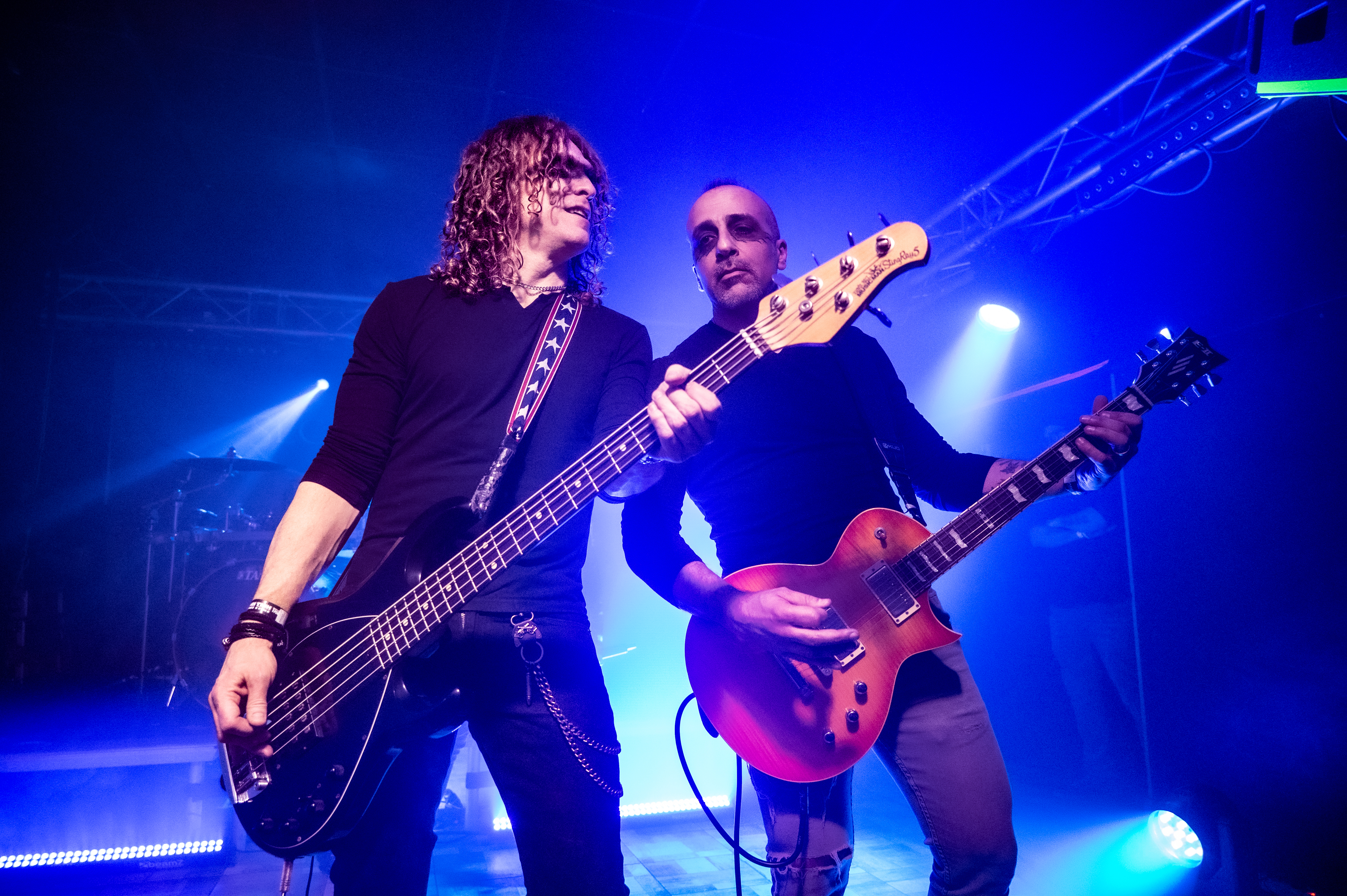

Background information
- Origin: Alessandria, Italy
- Genres: Progressive metal; power metal
- Years active: 1997–present
- Labels: Elevate, Nuclear Blast, Dockyard 1, Scarlet, Frontiers
- Members: Aldo Lonobile; Roberto Ramon Messina; Andy Buratto; Gabriele Ciaccia; Marco Lazzarini
- Past members: Michele Luppi; Paco Gianotti; Antonio Agate; Luca Cartasegna; Marco Pastorino; Federico Pennazzato
- Website: secretsphere.it

Secret Sphere is an Italian symphonic power metal band from Alessandria, formed by guitarist Aldo Lonobile in July 1997.

== History ==
=== Early Years (1997–2011) ===
Guitarist Aldo Lonobile formed Secret Sphere in July 1997. Early on, the band was influenced by hard rock, heavy metal, and classical music. After some lineup changes in December 1997, the band recorded their first demo, Between Story and Legend, in September 1998. The style of the demo was firmly in the symphonic power metal genre that was expanding in Italy at that time.

The demo caught the attention of the Italian progressive/power metal label Elevate Records, who signed the band to a two-album deal. In June 1999, Secret Sphere recorded the first full-length album, Mistress of the Shadowlight. The album continued in the stylistic direction shown on Between Story and Legend, and included re-recordings of a few songs from that demo.

In October 2001, the band returned to New Sin studios (where the first album had been recorded) to record their second full-length album, A Time Never Come, also released on Elevate Records.

Secret Sphere recorded two promo CDs in 2002 while in search of a new recording deal. They caught the attention of major German heavy metal label Nuclear Blast, who would go on to release the band's third album, Scent of Human Desire, in May 2003. Scent of Human Desire presented a change in direction for the band, focusing less on fantasy themes and more on romantic, sexual themes. After the release of Scent of Human Desire, drummer Luca Cartasegna left the band, citing difference in musical tastes.

The band's fourth album, Heart & Anger, was released in May 2005 on Nuclear Blast. Daniel Flores (Mind's Eye) was brought on as a session drummer for the recordings. After the album was released, a full replacement drummer was found in Federico Pennazzato. That same year, the band planned to back up the Danish progressive metal band Royal Hunt, however, the tour was cancelled two days before it was set to begin. A 2006 Scandinavian tour backing King Diamond was more successful for the band.

In 2008, Secret Sphere released their fifth album, Sweet Blood Theory, on Avalon in Japan and the German label Dockyard 1 Records in Europe. The album was based on the short story "The Vampyre", written by John William Polidori, as well as the atmospheres of Tim Burton's cinematographic work. Longtime members Antonio Agate (keyboards) and Paolo "Paco" Gianotti (guitars) departed the band after the release of the album; both had been with the band since the recording of their demo a decade before.

Dockyard 1 Records folded in 2009, but the band was picked up by the Italian heavy metal label Scarlet Records in time for their sixth full-length album, Archetype, released in September 2010. This was the first recording with new keyboardist Gabriele Ciaccia and new guitarist Marco Pastorino.

=== Vocalist change, Portrait of a Dying Heart, A Time Never Come re-recording, The Nature of Time (2012–2020) ===
In 2012, the band began recording for their seventh album. However, part way through recording, vocalist and founding member Roberto Ramon Messina left the band due to differences in musical direction. Michele Luppi, former vocalist of the Italian progressive power metal band Vision Divine, was recruited as Roberto's replacement, and the album, entitled Portrait of a Dying Heart, was released in November of that year on Scarlet Records. Drummer Fredderico Pennazzato left shortly after; Marco Lazzarini was chosen as his replacement.

Secret Sphere returned to the studio in 2015 to re-record their second album, A Time Never Come, in commemoration of the fifteenth anniversary of its release. A Time Never Come – 2015 edition was released by Scarlet Records in April 2015.

The band signed a multi-album deal with Frontiers Records in April 2016. Later that year, Frontiers released the band's first official live recording, One Night in Tokyo, as a 2CD + DVD set. Following the release of One Night in Tokyo, guitarist Marco Pastorino left the band. The band's eighth album, The Nature of Time, was released in June 2017, with Lonobile as the sole guitarist.

=== Messina returns, Lifeblood and Blackened Heartbeat (2020–) ===
Vocalist Michele Luppi, who joined the band in 2012, departed in 2020 in order to pursue his solo career. The remaining members of the band proceeded with the recording of a new album, Lifeblood, which was formally announced in January 2021 for a March 2021 release via Frontiers Records. Vocal duties on Lifeblood were handled by Roberto Ramon Messina, who returned to the band after an eight-year absence, uniting three members (Messina, Lonobile, and Buratto) who had performed on the bands' earliest albums. Lifeblood was widely praised by reviewers who noted the band's ability to combine the classic power metal sound of their early years with the melodic rock leanings of their later output.

Recording sessions for a new album commenced in July 2022. It was later announced that their tenth album, Blackened Heartbeat, would be released in November 2023.

== Band members ==
=== Current ===
- Aldo Lonobile − lead and rhythm guitars (1997–present)
- Andy Buratto − bass guitar (1997–present)
- Roberto Ramon Messina − vocals (1997–2012, 2020–present)
- Gabriele Ciaccia − keyboards (2009–present)
- Marco Lazzarini − drums (2013–present)

=== Former ===
- Gianmaria Saggi − guitars (1997)
- Paolo "Paco" Giantotti − guitars (1997–2009)
- Antonio Agate − keyboards (1997–2009)
- Cristiano Scagliotti − drums (1997–1998)
- Luca Cartasegna − drums (1998–2003)
- Dave Simeone − drums (2004)
- Daniel Flores − drums (2004–2005)
- Federico Pennazzato − drums (2005–2013)
- Marco Pastorino − guitars, backing vocals (2009–2017)
- Michele Luppi − vocals (2012–2020)

== Discography ==
=== Demo ===
- Between Story and Legend (1998)

=== Studio ===
- Mistress of the Shadowlight (1999)
- A Time Never Come (2001) - re-released in 2015
- Scent of Human Desire (2003)
- Heart & Anger (2005)
- Sweet Blood Theory (2008)
- Archetype (2010)
- Portrait of a Dying Heart (2012)
- The Nature of Time (2017)
- Lifeblood (2021)
- Blackened Heartbeat (2023)

=== Live ===
- One Night in Tokyo (2016, CD+DVD)

=== Tributes ===
- How Many Tears on The Keepers of Jericho (2000, Tribute to Helloween)
