= Nepal (band) =

Argentine trash metal band

Background information
- Origin: Buenos Aires, Argentina
- Genre: Thrash metal
- Years active: 1985–2000, 2023–present
- Labels: Nems Enterprises; Metal Command
- Members: Larry Zavala (voice); Beto Vázquez (bass); Javier Bagala (guitar); Marcelo Ponce (drums)
- Past members: Dario Galvan (drums); Facundo Vega (drums); Willie Urroz (voice); Raúl Jesaim (guitar)
- Website: www.hmnepal.8m.com

Nepal is an Argentine thrash metal band from Buenos Aires, originally assembled in 1984. The name is derived from the Asian country of Nepal.

== Biography ==
Nepal was formed in 1985 by Beto Vázquez and Javier Bagala. Later on Claudio "Larry" Zavala joined. The band participated in some metal festivals performing a new music style called "Power Black Metal".

In July 1988, Nepal recorded their first demo at Cosmos Studios "Aquellos Bastardos". It was released as cassette, in a split with the band Dr. Jekyll. The demo reached number one in Argentine charts for the category "Most Important National Demos". With this, they obtained more publicity in radios and magazines.

In June 1989 they recorded their second demo "Nepal II", again at "Cosmos Studios" with a better sound quality and production. They participated in some concerts at Cemento, Arlequines theater and Larrañaga theater. By the end of 1991, they had changed their line-up. They recorded the song "La Señal del Metal" to be released in a split-album with other local bands.

In April 1990 the band recorded the song "Represor" (at "Sonovision" studios in Buenos Aires with the help of Alejandro Devetak) to be include in the compilation "Thrash Vol.1", edited by "Radio Tripoli" label. The band re-released the demo "Nepal II" with a live track, "Te Destruiré", on side B. This edition sold 1000 copies.

=== Raza de Traidores (1993) ===
In January 1992 Dario Galvan joined the band, and they started to compose new material for an album. In November, they released their début album Raza de Traidores under "Metal Command Records" in cassette format. It was recorded and mixed between May and August in "TMA La Escuelita" studios. They played an album release gig at Buenos Aires and opened for the German band Kreator. The Uruguayan label Heavy Weigh Records released a South American compilation including Nepal's song "Represor". They first show in a foreign country was at Brazil (Timbó) at the Mountain Rock Festival with the band Syndrome in April 1995.

=== Ideología (1995) ===
In October 1995, they released their second album Ideología under "Metal Command Records” with the support of "Monsters of Rock" in a limited edition of 1000 copies. After that, they signed with NEMS Enterprises. They did some concerts at Buenos Aires to perform their new material. After the gig, the drummer, Dario Galvan, left the band and was replaced with Facundo Vega. They did two shows with Angra in September 1996.

=== Manifiesto (1997) ===
The band was invited to record the song "Love Gun" for a tribute album for Kiss with other national bands. The tribute was released in October 1996 under Sleaze Records. The Official Iron Maiden Argentine Fan Club organized a concert tribute at "Cemento" in May 1997. The band interpreted Wrathchild, Running Free and Judas Be My Guide. The show was filmed to be shown to Iron Maiden's members.

At the end of 1996, the band started making the songs for their third album Manifiesto. That was mostly recorded, and mixed at El Zoologico studios. This was released under Nems Enterprises in Argentina, and Rock Brigade Records in Brazil.

Manifiesto was recorded with Holophonics 3D Sound system, made and developed by the engineer Hugo Zuccarelli. With this technology, the audience can experience the sound three-dimensionally: listening to the album gives the impression of hearing the vocals and the instruments from outside, like in reality. This technology has been utilized by bands and musicians like Pink Floyd, Yes, Roger Waters, Vangelis, Steve Vai and Paul McCartney.

=== Last years ===
The concerts for the release of their new album started in January 1998. In April, the band played as support for the band Moonspell. On 22 August, they did so for Blind Guardian in Buenos Aires at "Cemento". The same year they participated in the "Metal Rock Festival II".

The producer of "Rock and Pop International" invited Nepal to open for Megadeth on 4 October 1998. The same month they played in "Cemento".

In January 1999 the drummer Dario Galvan left the band to start a project of progressive music. He was replaced by Marcelo Ponce. The band played with Almafuerte in Obras Sanitarias for 5000 metalheads. At the end of May, Nepal played again in "Cemento" with two new songs ("Genosiglo" and "Sobre el Filo") that were ready for the fourth album, never released.

The band split-up in 2000. Larry Zavala started with a solo project, and Beto Vazquez started with a band named Beto Vázquez Infinity.

== Members ==
=== Last line-up ===
- Larry Zavala - Vocals
- Beto Vázquez - Bass and backing vocals
- Javier Bagala - Guitar
- Marcelo Ponce - Drums

=== Past members ===
- Dario Galvan - Drums
- Facundo Vega - Drums
- Willie Urroz - Voice
- Raúl Jesaim - Guitar
- Jorge "Tanque" Iglesias - Drums

=== Guest musicians ===
- Ricardo Iorio
- André Matos
- George Biddle
- Kiko Loureiro
- Martin Walkyier
- Hansi Kursch

== Discography ==
=== Albums ===
- Raza de Traidores (1993)
- Ideología (1995)
- Manifiesto (1997)

=== Demos ===
- Aquellos Bastardos/Rompehuesos (Split CD) (1988)
- Nepal II (1989)

=== Collaborations ===
- Metal Rock Festival II (1998)
- Navidad Metálica (1999)

=== Cover songs ===
- "Love Gun", by Kiss
- "Children of the Grave", by Black Sabbath
- "Lanzado Al Mundo Hoy", by V8
- "Muy Cansado Estoy", by V8
