= When All the Heroes Are Dead =

Studio album by Vision Divine
- Released: 25 October 2019
- Genre: Power metal
- Length: 55:27
- Label: Scarlet Records

Vision Divine chronology
Destination Set to Nowhere (2012)	When All the Heroes Are Dead (2019)	Blood and Angels' Tears (2024)

When All the Heroes Are Dead is the eighth full-length album by Vision Divine, released in 2019 on Scarlet Records.

A whole nine years having passed since the previous Vision Divine album, Vision Divine featured a new singer for this album, former The Voice contestant Ivan Giannini, as well a drummer known from other bands, Mike Terrana.

== Reception ==
Rock Hard gave 8 points out of 10, whereas Metal Hammer Italia gave the album a 85 % score. It had to be "the power album of the year", contending with modern milestones in the genre. The newcomers fit seamlessly into the group, resulting in "a complete, interesting and enjoyable album".

Inferno.fi graded it even higher with 4.5 out of 5, commenting that "Vision Divine restores faith in high-quality, straightforward and stylistically pure power metal with their eighth album". The "quality and craftsmanship" was undeniable enough as to ""captivate even the most skeptical listener". Dangerdog noted that Vision Divine played their usual "epic and bombastic melodic and symphonic power metal", but succeeded in songwriting that was "simply catchy, nearing AOR accessibility. Combining assertive and speedy power metal with AOR accessibility may seem oxymoronic but, believe me, it's there". The score was a full 5 out of 5.

== Track listing ==
1. "Insurgent (Intro)" – 1:57
2. "The 26th Machine" – 4:37
3. "3 Men Walk on the Moon" – 5:10
4. "Fall from Grace" – 4:56
5. "Were I God" – 4:24
6. "Now That All the Heroes Are Dead" – 4:52
7. "While the Sun Is Turning Black" – 4:57
8. "The King of the Sky" – 4:39
9. "On the Ides of March" – 5:01
10. "300" – 5:04
11. "The Nihil Propaganda" – 3:48

Japanese edition bonus tracks

12. "Angel of Revenge" – 6:02
13. "Rusty Nail" (X Japan cover) – 5:20

== Personnel ==
- Ivan Giannini – vocals
- Olaf Thörsen – guitar
- Federico Puleri – guitar
- Andrea "Tower" Torricini – bass
- Alessio Lucatti – keyboard
- Mike Terrana – drums
