= Hollow Haze =

Italian metal band

Hollow Haze is an Italian progressive and power metal band. They released six albums, including two on Scarlet Records and one on Frontiers Records.

The band, at the time with Fabio Lione doing the vocals, signed with Scarlet Records ahead of the release of 2013's Countdown to Revenge. Fabio Dessi from Arthemis later took over as singer. The deal with Frontiers Records came about before 2019's Between Wild Landscapes and Deep Blue Seas was published.

== Discography ==
- Hollow Haze (2006)
- The Hanged Man (2008)
- End of a Dark Era (2010)
- Poison in Black (2012)
- Countdown to Revenge (2013)
- Memories of an Ancient Time (2015)
- Between Wild Landscapes and Deep Blue Seas (2019)
