= Ideología =

Studio album by Nepal
- Released: 1995
- Recorded: 1995
- Genre: Thrash metal
- Length: 37:54
- Label: Nems

Nepal chronology
Raza de Traidores (1993)	Ideología (1995)	Manifiesto (1997)

Ideología is the second album by Nepal. In October 1995, they released their second album "Ideología" under "Metal Command Records” with the support of "Monsters of Rock" in a limited edition of 1000 copies. After that, they signed with NEMS Enterprises. They did some concerts at Buenos Aires to perform their new material. After the gig, the drummer, Dario Galvan, left the band and was replaced with Facundo Vega. They did two shows with Angra in September 1996.

== Track listing ==
1. "Escenio" - 01:11
2. "Realidades" - 04:31
3. "Ideología" - 06:22
4. "Guerra Sucia" - 03:12
5. "Paredes De Hierro" - 03:46
6. "Enfriando Las Heridas" - 05:08
7. "Golpea" - 02:37
8. "Katmandú" - 02:38
9. "Herederos Del Miedo" - 04:55
10. "Predicando La Mentira" - 03:32
