= Michele Luppi =

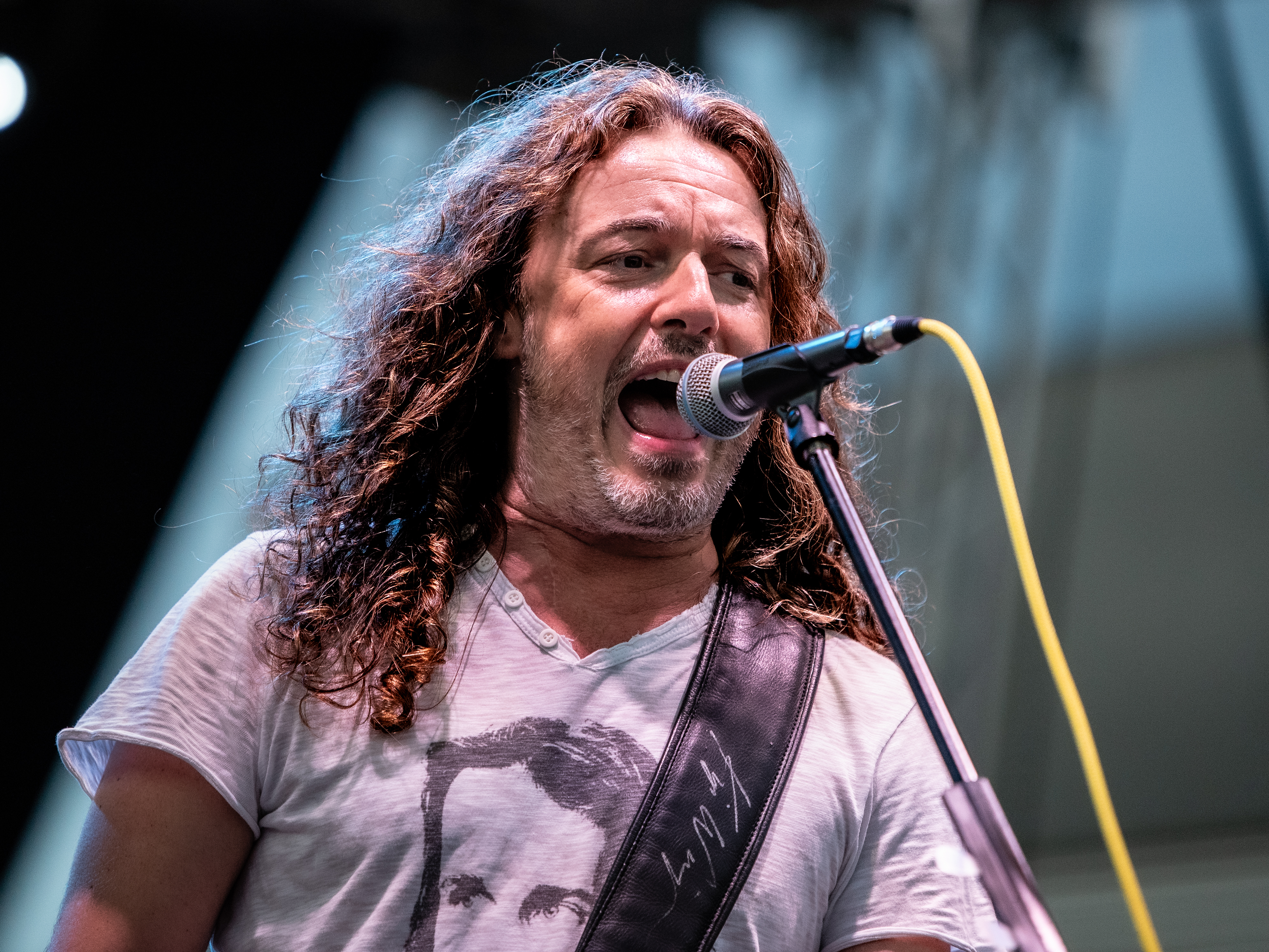
- Luppi in 2024

Background information
- Born: 7 April 1974 (age 52); Carpi, Province of Modena, Emilia-Romagna, Italy
- Genres: Hard rock; heavy metal
- Occupations: Musician; singer; producer
- Instruments: Vocals; keyboards; bass
- Website: www.micheleluppi.com

Michele Luppi (born 7 April 1974) is an Italian singer, keyboardist, producer, and vocal coach.

== Career ==
=== 1990s ===
In 1994, Luppi joined his first band Mr. Pig. Michele debuted as frontman singer. The band became a famous live act in Italy, performing songs from Mr. Big's album Lean Into It. In 1997 he started teaching singers in his studio MiLu’s Rock Lab and in Italian music schools, while developing a vocal method that is a core topic of his voice control workshops. In 1998, he obtained a diploma at Vocal Institute of Technology (VIT) and started to work as a professional singer, composer and producer, in both live and studio sessions, next to artists as Reb Beach, Eric Martin, Gregg Giuffria, Maurizio Solieri, George Lynch, Doug Aldrich, Ian Paice and many others.

=== 2000s ===
From 2002 to 2003, Luppi took part in Umberto Tozzi's World Tour as a backing vocalist and keyboard player. In August 2003, he joined Vision Divine with whom he released three albums: Stream of Consciousness (2004), the Stage Of Consciousness DVD (2005), The Perfect Machine (2005) and The 25th Hour (2007). He performed world tours with Vision Divine and other opening acts for artists as Dream Theater, Nightwish, Helloween, Children Of Bodom and many others until his departure from the band in 2008. In 2005 he released his first solo album Strive. In 2007 he started to collaborate with the band Los Angeles and released two albums: Los Angeles (2007) featuring Giuffria on keyboards, and Neverland (2009) for Frontiers Records featuring the song Nowhere to Hide, composed by Michele and George Lynch (Dokken, Lynch Mob).

In 2008, Luppi established the melodic metal band Killing Touch. He wrote and produced all the materials for their debut album One of a Kind (2009). In 2009 he collaborated in the songwriting for Solieri’s first solo album Volume I and performed with Maurizio Solieri Band as the opening act for Italian concerts of Deep Purple's "Rapture of the Deep World Tour" and for the AC/DC concert in Udine. In 2015, the song "Please Believe Me" became part of the soundtrack for the Italian movie One More Day by director Andrea Preti.

=== 2010s ===
In 2010, Luppi joined the Finnish metal band Thaurorod for the "Power of Metal" European Tour Tour with Symphony X and Nevermore and played major European festivals. He took part as singer and keyboard player in a major event in Bologna: The Ultimate World Guitar Exhibition with artists such as Yngwie Malmsteen, Glenn Hughes, Gregg Bissonette, Derek Sherinian and Neil Murray.

He became singer of the Italian power metal band Secret Sphere in 2011, and in 2012 released the album Portrait Of A Dying Heart. Secret Sphere performed at Wacken Open Air 2013 and three of their songs were included in the official Wacken DVD. In 2015 Secret Sphere re-released their classic album A Time Never Come completely re-recorded and arranged with Michele on vocals. He also established his own band, the Michele Luppi Band where he sings and plays bass, touring all around Italy.

In 2015, he joined the band Whitesnake performing backing vocals and as keyboard player for "The Purple Tour" touring worldwide.

=== 2020s ===
In 2025, Vision Divine announced the return of Luppi on lead vocals for a new album and tour.

== Discography ==
Vision Divine

- Stream of Consciousness - (2004)
- Stage of Consciousness (live) - (2005)
- The Perfect Machine - (2005)
- The 25th Hour - (2007)
- Clockwork Reverie - (2026)

Michele Luppi's Heaven

- Strive - (2005)

Los Angeles

- Los Angeles - (2007)
- Neverland - (2009)

Killing Touch

- One of a Kind - (2009)

Secret Sphere

- Portrait of a Dying Heart - (2012)
- A Time Never Come – 2015 edition - (2015)
- One Night in Tokyo (live) - (2016)
- The Nature of Time (2017)

Whitesnake

- The Purple Tour - (2018)
- Flesh & Blood - (2019)
