= Sara Squadrani =

Italian singer (born 1986)

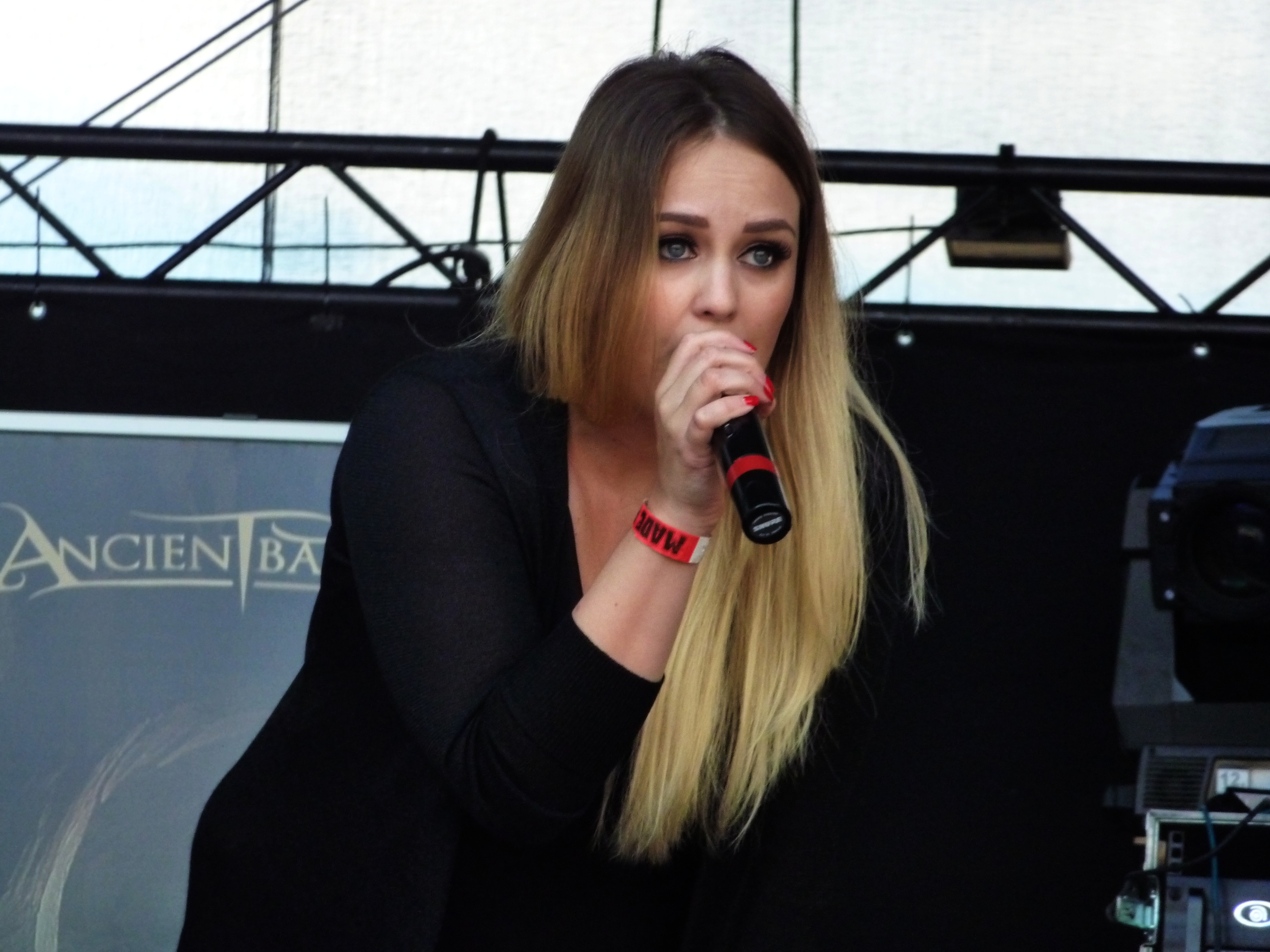
- Sara Squadrani during Ancient Bards show at Made of Metal (Hodonín 17 August 2014)

Background information
- Born: Sara Squadrani; 14 February 1986 (age 40); Rimini, Emilia-Romagna Italy
- Genres: Symphonic metal; power metal; epic metal
- Occupation: Singer-songwriter
- Instrument: Vocals
- Years active: 2007–present
- Label: Limb Music
- Website: allthingssara.com

Sara Squadrani (born 14 February 1986) is an Italian soprano singer, best known as a vocalist of the Italian symphonic power metal band Ancient Bards since 2007.

She has also collaborated with Arjen Anthony Lucassen's metal opera project Ayreon in 2013 and has a made guest appearance on album The Theory of Everything as a character called "The Girl". In 2016, she also collaborated with Italian power metal band Trick or Treat on the album Rabbits' Hill Pt. 2.

Besides singing, she studied at the University of Bologna as an architecture and building engineering student.

== Discography ==
=== Ancient Bards ===
The Black Crystal Sword Saga;

- The Alliance of the Kings (2010)
- Soulless Child (2011)
- A New Dawn Ending (2014)
- Origine The Black Crystal Sword Saga Part 2 (2019)
- Artifex (2025)

EPs;

- Trailer of the Black Crystal Sword Saga (2008)

=== Guest appearances ===
- Ayreon – The Theory of Everything – 2013
- Trick or Treat – Rabbits' Hill Pt. 2 – vocals on "Never Say Goodbye" – 2016
