= Fabio Lione =

Italian singer

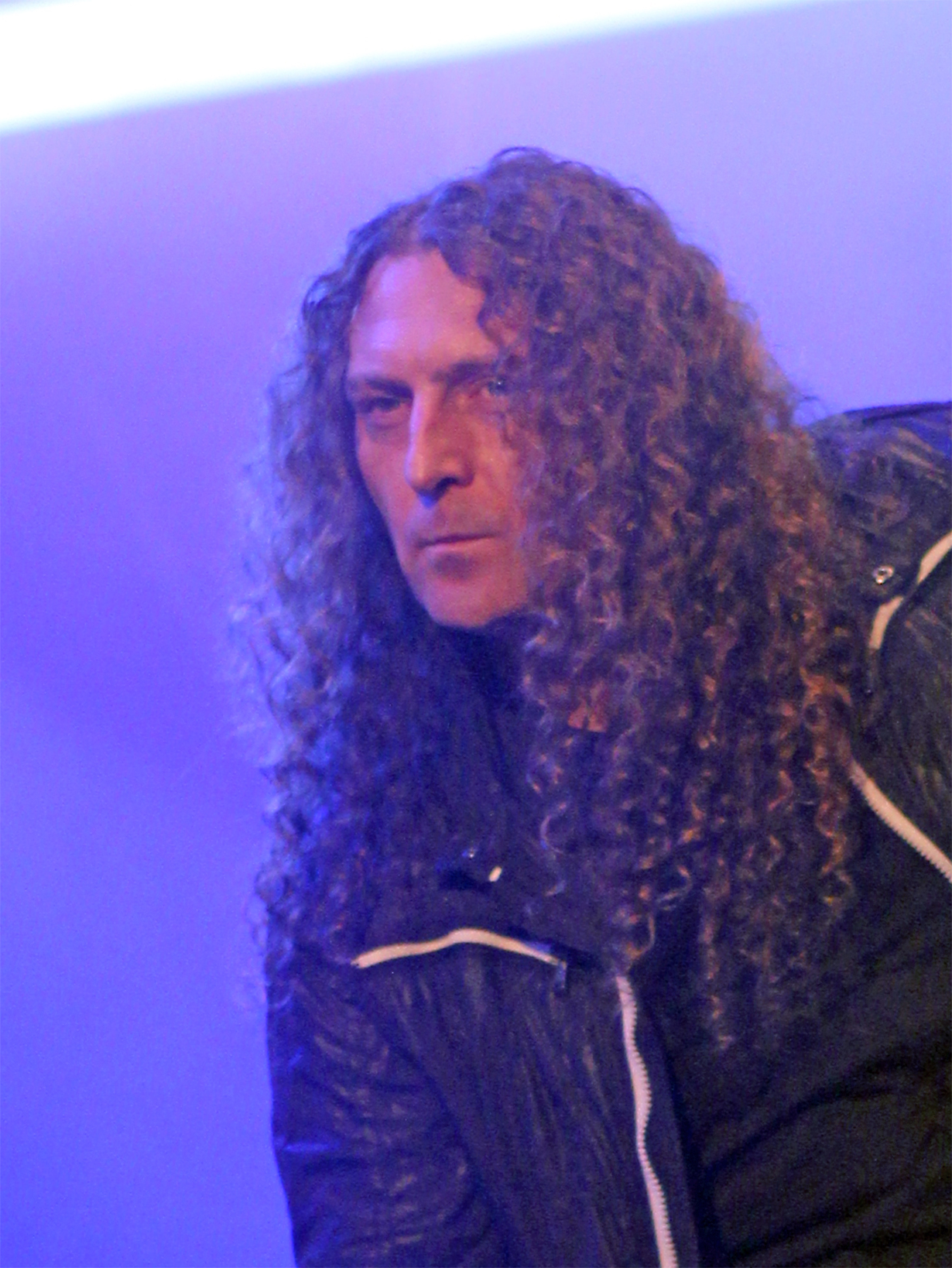
- Fabio Lione at the 2014 Rockharz Open Air, Germany

Background information
- Also known as: J. Storm
- Born: Fabio Tordiglione; 9 October 1973 (age 53); Pisa, Italy
- Genres: Heavy metal, Eurobeat
- Occupation: Singer
- Years active: 1990–present
- Member of: Spirits of Fire; Athena; Fabio Lione's Dawn of Victory
- Formerly of: Rhapsody of Fire; Turilli / Lione Rhapsody; Angra; Vision Divine; Labyrinth; Hollow Haze

Fabio Tordiglione (born 9 October 1973), known professionally as Fabio Lione, is an Italian singer who has worked with many bands in the heavy metal genre. He was known for being the singer of Italian symphonic power metal band Rhapsody of Fire for 21 years. He later formed his own band Turilli / Lione Rhapsody with former Rhapsody of Fire guitarist Luca Turilli and took the slot for lead vocalist of Angra until 2026. He was also the original singer of Labyrinth and Vision Divine.

== Career ==
Lione was born in Pisa. His career started in 1990 at the age of 17 when he began to sing with a small rock and roll underground group who played classics of 1950s and 1960s similar to Elvis Presley's songs. He had a passion for groups such as Queensrÿche, Fates Warning, and Crimson Glory, which inspired him to form his own heavy metal band.

His musical activities continued with a young group from Pisa, named Athena. They were a progressive metal band with their own unique style and challenged various expressions. Lione recorded a demotape with Athena and it was his first experience in a metal band. Lione did twenty shows with the band, but after two years, he left the band in 1994. Athena made their first album in 1995 (Inside the moon).

At first his stage name was Joe Terry which was the combination of his favourite heroes' names in Japanese games (Joe Higashi and Terry Bogard from Fatal Fury). His first piece of musical equipment was a Shure SM 58 microphone.

=== Labyrinth ===
Lione met the band Labyrinth, then going under the name of "Vision". Shortly after, in 1993 the band started to work on a demotape called Midnight Resistance, lyrics and vocal lines written by Lione. Before the album No Limits was released, Lione recorded a mini CD with Labyrinth, [Piece of Time] lyrics and vocal lines written by Fabio Lione.

Lione created the album No Limits together with Olaf, a band member of Labyrinth. His lyrics were mainly based on his personal experiences and his emotions. He wrote vocal lines and lyrics for this record, all the lyrics in the album were connected as Lione did this as an experiment. Labyrinth's style was different from other bands because it was mixed with different music genres including thrash metal and progressive rock. Lione was the singer of Labyrinth for just more than three years.

=== Athena ===
Lione joined Athena in 1991 and in 1992 they recorded their first demotape. After several concerts he left the band in 1993 for a new collaboration, the one with Labyrinth. Athena called Lione again in '97 ..so they could start work on their second album A New Religion which was released in 1998. Lione wrote the lyrics and the vocal lines for ten songs; the lyrics used religious and philosophical words and had the tendency to reflect deep meanings on their music. Lione and the other members of Athena attended Axel Rudi Pell Tour 1998 with Dreamscape, another progressive metal band from Germany in December. Shortly after the tour the band decided to break up.

=== Vision Divine ===
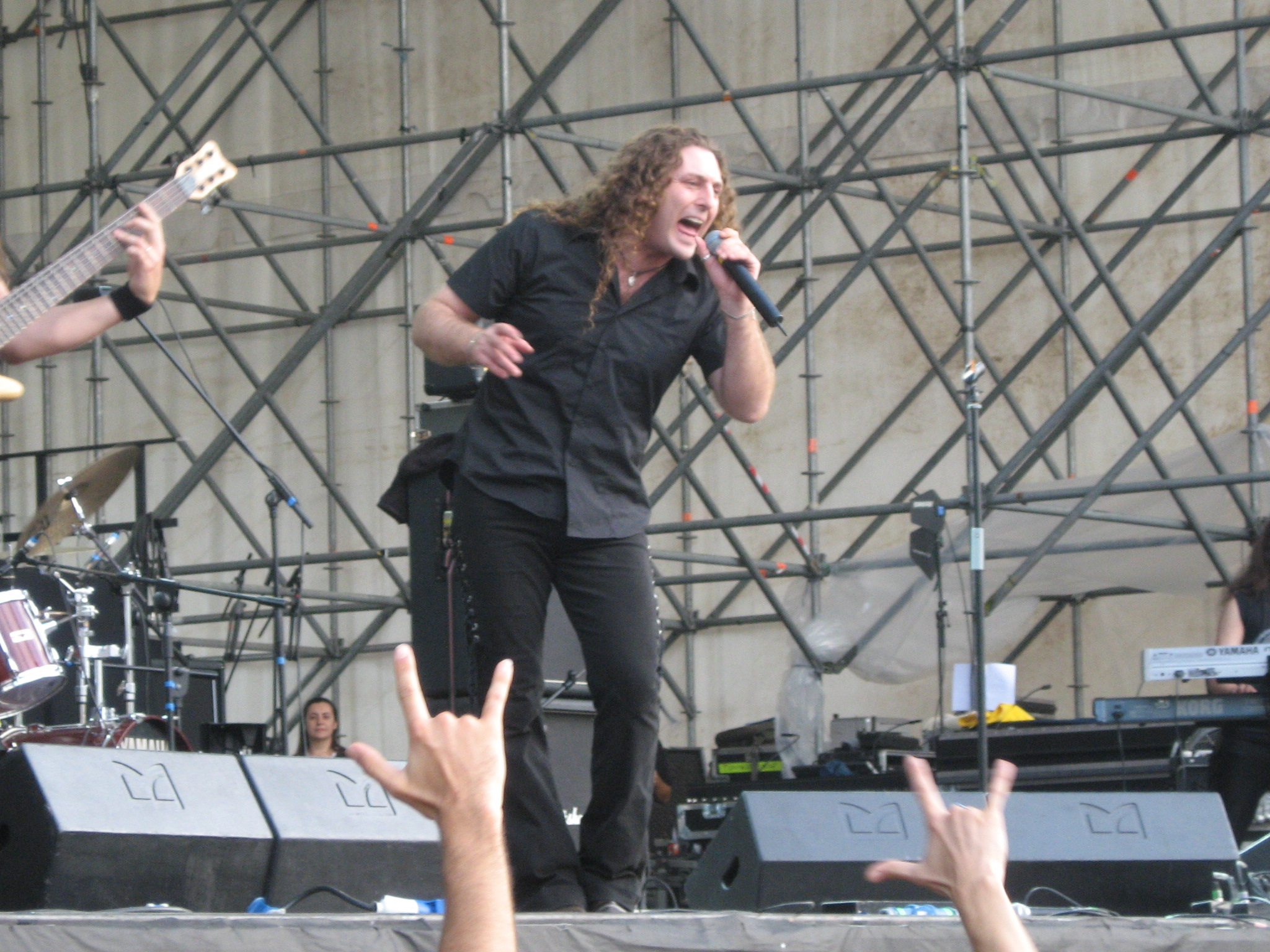
Lione at the Rockin' Field Festival of Milan in 2008

In 1998, Lione met Olaf Thorsen and to seal their newfound friendship, they decided to create what was originally supposed to be only a side-project: Vision Divine. Lione now found himself in the two groups: Rhapsody and Vision Divine, and this situation continued, with successes in both groups, until 2003. The first "Vision Divine" record in 1999 received excellent sales results and criticism (and took the band on tour in South America for the first time). The second album of Vision Divine Send me an angel was released in January 2002. Lione composed eight vocal lines for this album. Their expressions became more serious and deeper, close to the reality of divinity and humanity with progressive and heavy sounds. The album Beto Vazquez Infinity was released in February, including the song "The battle of the Past" in which Lione was singing as a guest vocalist for the Beto Vazquez project.

In 2003, Lione sang at shows with Vision Divine at Gods of Metal 2003 (Milan) and at Heineken Jammin' Festival (Imola) in June. He then recorded four demo songs with Vision Divine in November and performed on an Italian Tour in December. Shortly after it was announced Lione had to leave the band, due to his other commitments making it too difficult front this band as well. He nevertheless spent most of the year writing and left the band nine new vocal lines for the "Stream of Consciousness" album, executed with a different singer.

In 2008, Lione took part in some shows with Vision Divine to celebrate the ten years of the band, and on 28 May, they announced that Fabio had rejoined the band as the new singer. The band released the new CD "9 Degrees West of the Moon" in 2009 and did many shows supporting the record.

In 2012, they released (with Edel/Ear music) what is probably considered their best work so far, "Destination Set To Nowhere", with many great reviews received. The band performed many shows in Italy, Spain and on a South-American tour supporting the record.

Fabio departed from Vision Divine on 28 April 2018.

=== Rhapsody of Fire ===
In 1997, the most important and longest running moment began: becoming the lead vocalist of the heavy metal/power metal band Rhapsody. Rhapsody first began negotiations with Lione at Gate Pathway Studio in Wolfsburg, Germany after hearing him in the "Piece of Time" album from Labyrinth. Later that year, the first of many albums, Legendary Tales, was released with Lione as lead vocalist. The second album, Symphony of Enchanted Lands, would be released in 1998, followed by Dawn of Victory in 2000.

The band participated in many concerts throughout their first years. Lione also recorded a new EP album Rain of a Thousand Flames with Rhapsody in Germany between April and August. The album was released in December 2001. Lione performed on stages with Rhapsody at Gods of Metal 2001 (Milan) in June, during South American Tour (Mexico, Colombia, Brazil and Chile) and at Rock Machina Festival (Spain) in July. After these concerts, Lione and Rhapsody recorded their fifth album Power of the Dragonflame. The album was released in March 2002.

Rhapsody travelled with Stratovarius and Sonata Arctica on a successful European tour in April and May 2000 when they also had a chance to join the Wacken Festival 2000 in Germany. Lione attended Rock Machina Festival in Spain in July. Lione set out on Rhapsody's first headlining tour (Germany, France, Italy, Spain, the Netherlands, Belgium, Switzerland, Japan and Korea) and joined the summer festivals in Europe including the Bang Your Head Festival in Germany.

In February 2004, he finished vocals for Rhapsody's new album Symphony of Enchanted Lands II: The Dark Secret. The band went promo tour for their new album throughout Canada, US, Germany, Sweden, Czech Republic, Greece, and the UK. On the album's release day, 27 September, the band had a signing session with Christopher Lee in London. Lione also appeared with Christopher Lee on a TV music program in Germany. In 2005, because of copyright issues, the band officially changed its name to Rhapsody of Fire. Under the label Nuclear Blast, they released two more albums and one EP and did a worldwide tour as well as many festivals.

Triumph or Agony was released in 2006, followed by The Frozen Tears of Angels and The Cold Embrace of Fear – A Dark Romantic Symphony in 2010 and From Chaos to Eternity in 2011. Rhapsody of Fire, with Lione at its helm, went back to the studio without long time guitarist and founding member Luca Turilli, to record a new album, Dark Wings of Steel, Fabio Lione wrote all the lyrics for this record. The album was released in 2013.

In 2016, the band released the album Into the Legend, all lyrics written by Fabio Lione. After a short tour promoting the album, Lione announced on 28 September that he was parting ways with the band. From April 2017 to March 2018, he joined Turilli and his former bandmates to perform on Rhapsody's 20th Anniversary Farewell Tour.

=== Turilli / Lione Rhapsody ===
In December 2018, Lione and Luca Turilli announced that they had formed a new band: Turilli / Lione Rhapsody. They were joined by former members Alex Holzwarth, Patrice Guers and Dominique Leurqin. They released their only studio album Zero Gravity (Rebirth and Evolution) on 5 July 2019. Following the band's final tour in Latin America in January and February 2023, the band disbanded at its conclusion, which was announced prior as the band "closing a chapter of their career for good".

=== Fabio Lione's Dawn of Victory ===
In March 2025, Lione formed Fabio Lione's Dawn of Victory alongside Leurquin, Guers, Holzwarth, and Justin Hombach.

=== Kamelot ===
On 16 December 2010, American power metal band Kamelot announced that Lione would take over lead vocal duties for Roy Khan for the Kamelot's tour supporting their "Poetry for the Poisoned" release due to Khan's eventual departure from Kamelot. 70000 Tons of Metal was the last of 49 shows with them, in January 2012.

=== Angra ===
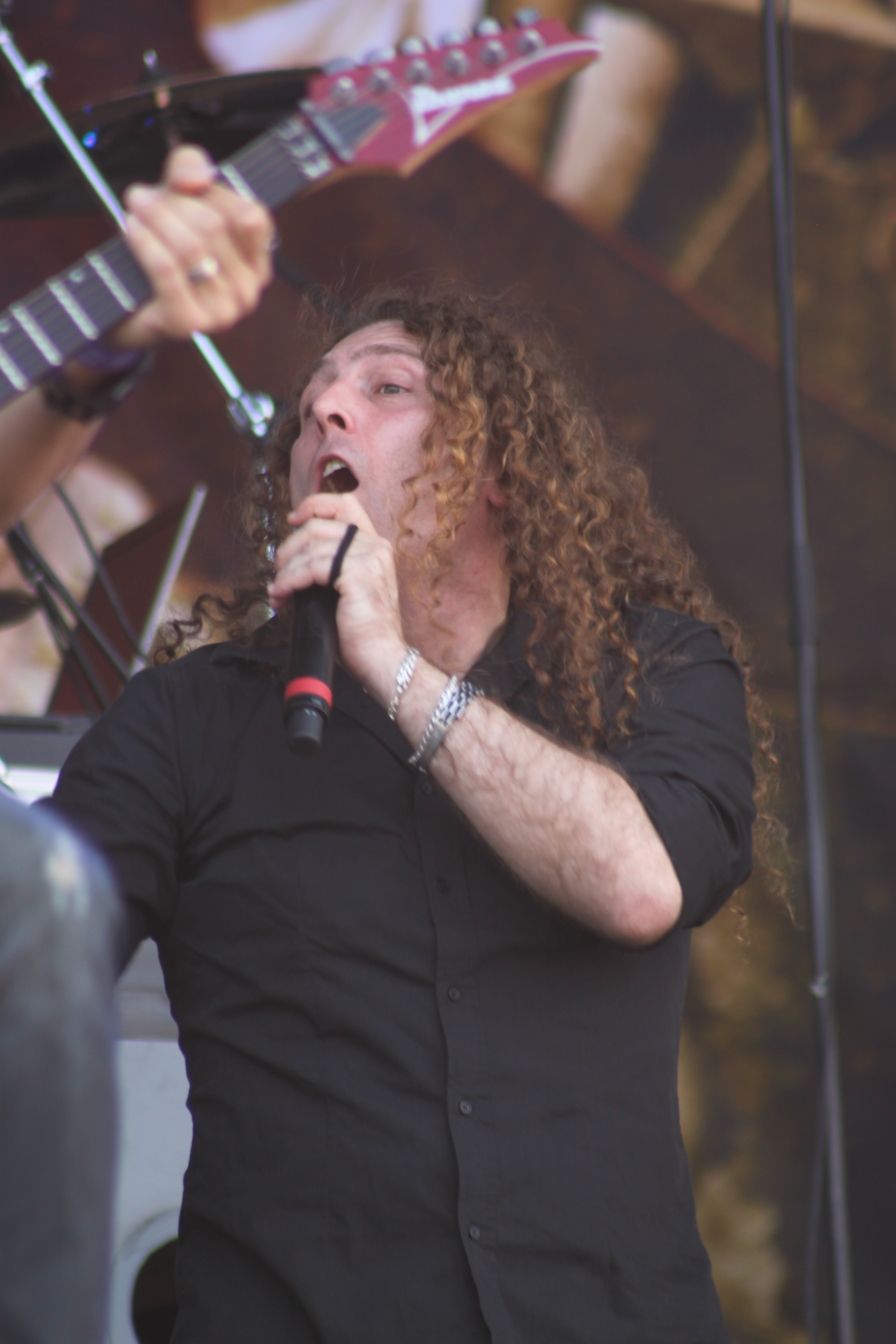
Lione with Angra at the 2014 Hellfest

In January 2013, Lione was again on the stage at 70000 Tons of Metal, but this time with Brazilian progressive metal band Angra. The two shows were a great success and Fabio was again with them at the Live n' Louder Festival in São Paulo with Twisted Sister, Metal Church and Loudness. After that, the band decides to do a special tour, a commemorative one celebrating 20 years from the release of the first record "Angels Cry". They celebrate 20 years of career with 11 shows in Latin-America and the release of a new DVD, recorded in the last show in São Paulo. After that Angra played in Japan as co/headliner at the Loud Park festival 13 with Stone Temple Pilots and Europe and they had a very good response. The commemorative tour continues with another 14 shows in Latin America and 4 shows in Europe, where the band performed at Hellfest in France, alongside Black Sabbath, Soundgarden, Aerosmith and others. Following Hellfest, Angra returned to Sweden to record "Secret Garden".

Angra announced that the band's new release, and the first album to feature vocalist Fabio Lione, entitled Secret Garden. The album was released by JVC in Asia on 17 December and later released on 16 January 2015 in Brazil, published by Universal Music, and North America, Europe, and Russia. The album brings what the band has called "a true renewal in the style of the band." With production by producer Roy Z (Judas Priest, Bruce Dickinson, Halford) and was recorded and produced in Sweden by Jens Bogren (Kreator, Arch Enemy, Opeth).

Lione departed from the band after the Bangers Open Air show in April 2026.

== Eurobeat ==
Lione's first Eurobeat song, 'Eye of the Tiger', was released in Japan in 2000. His name for Eurobeat project was "J. Storm", deriving from Joey Tempest. He published thirteen Eurobeat songs (list below) under this name between 2000 and 2005 and has declared that he wouldn't be making any more Eurobeat in the future. One of his songs, "Dance into the Fire", was recorded and produced in 2000, but wasn't released until late 2013. A couple of his songs were used in the Initial D franchise. "Dancin' in My Dreams" was used in the original video animation Initial D Battle Stage and was the ending theme of the video games Initial D Arcade Stage Ver. 3 and Initial D Street Stage. "Demolition" was also used in Initial D Street Stage.

- Eurobeat Disney 003 – J. Storm – Ave Maria
- Euromach 013 – J. Storm – Rock The Universe
- Euromach 015 – J. Storm – We Are The Children of Rock
- Super Eurobeat 101 – J. Storm – Eye of the Tiger
- Super Eurobeat 105 – J. Storm – M.U.S.I.C.
- Super Eurobeat 106 – J. Storm – I Wanna Be Your Rainbow
- Super Eurobeat 109 – J. Storm – Born To Make Music
- Super Eurobeat 115 – J. Storm – The Power of the Dance
- Super Eurobeat 122 – J. Storm – Dancing in My Dreams
- Super Eurobeat 135 – J. Storm – Demolition
- Super Eurobeat 144 – J. Storm – Gettin' You Gettin' Me
- Super Eurobeat 153 – J. Storm – Shout
- Super Eurobeat 157 – J. Storm – Vision of Paradise
- Super Eurobeat 226 – J. Storm – Dance into The Fire

== Discography ==
Rhapsody of Fire releases

Turilli / Lione Rhapsody releases

- Zero Gravity (Rebirth and Evolution) (2019)

Labyrinth releases

- No Limits (1996)

Athena releases

- A New Religion? (1998)
- Everflow Part 1: Frames of Humanity (2024)

Vision Divine releases

- Vision Divine (1999)
- Send Me an Angel (2002)
- 9 Degrees West of the Moon (2009)
- Destination Set to Nowhere (2012)

Ayreon releases

- Universal Migrator Part 2: Flight of the Migrator (1999)

Hollow Haze releases

- Countdown to Revenge (2013)

Angra releases

- Angels Cry 20th Anniversary Tour (CD/DVD/BLU-RAY) (2013)
- Secret Garden (2014)
- ØMNI (2018)
- Ømni Live (CD/DVD/BLU-RAY) (2021)
- Cycles Of Pain (2023)

Avalon releases

- Angels of the Apocalypse (2014)
- The Enigma Birth (2021)

Spirits of Fire

- Embrace the Unknown (2022)

Ancient Bards

- A New Dawn Ending (2014)

Miscellaneous releases

- Beto Vázquez Infinity / Battle of Valmourt (2001)
- Beto Vázquez Infinity / Beto Vázquez Infinity (2001)
- The Keepers of Jericho/ Various Artists (2000)

Thy Majestie releases

- ShiHuangDi (2012)

Sebastien releases

- Tears of white roses (2010)
- J.Storm Eurobeat Songs

Alexander Koller's SALVATOR release

- The Ariser (2015)

Evan K release

- Blue Lightning (2016)

Eternal Idol release

- The Unrevealed Secret (2016)
- Renaissance (2020)
- Rocking with the Idols (covers EP) (2021)

Steel Seal release

- The Lion's Den (2017)

Ancestral Dawn release

- Souldance (2017)

Soulspell release

- The Second Big Bang (2017)

Coherent Souls Orchestra release

- The Unshatterable Light (2017)

Lione/Conti

- Lione/Conti (2018; duet album with Alessandro Conti)

Cruel Juno

- A Little Punctuation (2019)
- Your Bones They Keep (2021)

Opera Magna

- What Was Dreamt And Lived (2022)

Enorion

- Vis Divina (2022)

Timo Tolkki's Avalon

- The Enigma Birth (2023)

Flor de Loto

- Lines Of Nasca (2023)

Moonlight Liar

- Moonlight Liar (2023)
- Devourer of sins (2024)
- Drama (2024)

Jethzabel

- JEZABEL (2024)

Rimmar Project

- Raises (2025)

A Flying Fish

- El Pez Que Vólo - Act II (2025)

Bendida

- Elysian Fields (2025)

Saloma

- Ángel de Acero (2025)
