= Blood and Angels' Tears =

Studio album by Vision Divine
- Released: 20 September 2024
- Genre: Power metal
- Length: 48:09
- Label: Scarlet Records

Vision Divine chronology
When All the Heroes Are Dead (2019)	Blood and Angels' Tears (2024)

Blood and Angels' Tears is the ninth full-length album by Vision Divine, released in 2024 on Scarlet Records.

Five years had passed since the previous Vision Divine album; it was asserted that Blood and Angels' Tears was part one of a two-part work. Several guest vocalists appeared; Ray Alder of Fates Warning, Alessandro Conti of Twilight Force and AC Wild of Bulldozer.

== Reception ==
Powermetal.de opined that "the band has never been as strong and compelling". Scoring the album 8.5 out of 10 as "a minor masterpiece", the reviewer noted epic and dramatic songwriting, but all in all the band "place a stronger emphasis on the highly melodic chorus passages, some of which immediately become earworms". There had therefore hardly been "better material in melodic metal this year". Metal Hammer Italia gave the album an almost identical score of 84%. It was "probably the most epic ever made by Thorsen and his bandmates", with individual songs being described as "truly earth-shaking", "an absolute gem" or a "devastating power attack". When the album stagnated midway through, the level was still high; "three solid and compact songs, rich in everything mentioned so far, and endowed with the usual, extremely high quality".

Metal Hammer Germany was more reserved with its 4 out of 7 score, noting a tendency for the songs to get "out of hand" and be overwhelming, diminishing the replay value. The advice for Vision Divine was to focus on "simple effectiveness". Inferno.fi gave 3 out of 5 points and Rock Hard 7.5 points out of 10.

== Track listing ==
1. "Chapter I: War in Heaven – 2:22
2. "Chapter II: The Ballet of Blood and Angels' Tears – 5:38
3. "Chapter III: Once Invincible – 4:32
4. "Chapter IV: Drink Our Blood – 4:11
5. "Chapter V: When Darkness Comes – 5:06
6. "Chapter VI: Preys – 5:24
7. "Chapter VII: A Man on a Mission – 2:23
8. "Chapter VIII: Go East – 4:59
9. "Chapter IX: The Broken Past – 4:06
10. "Chapter X: Dice and Dancers – 5:01
11. "Chapter XI: Lost – 4:27

== Personnel ==
- Ivan Giannini – vocals
- Olaf Thörsen – guitar
- Federico Puleri – guitar
- Andrea "Tower" Torricini – bass
- Alessio Lucatti – keyboard
- Matt Peruzzi – drums
