= Turilli / Lione Rhapsody =

Italian symphonic metal band

- Also known as: Turilli Lione Rhapsody
- Origin: Trieste, Italy
- Genres: Symphonic metal, progressive metal
- Years active: 2018–2023
- Label: Nuclear Blast
- Past members: Luca Turilli; Fabio Lione; Dominique Leurquin; Patrice Guers; Alex Holzwarth

Turilli / Lione Rhapsody was an Italian symphonic metal band formed in December 2018, by former Rhapsody of Fire members Luca Turilli and Fabio Lione. The lineup also included former Rhapsody of Fire members Alex Holzwarth, Patrice Guers, and Dominique Leurquin. Prior to the band's formation, the same lineup performed under the Rhapsody moniker for the 20th Anniversary Farewell Tour, which celebrated 20 years of the original band's existence. On the same day that the band formed, the band started a crowdfunding campaign on Indiegogo to fund their only studio album. The first intention, after the end of the Rhapsody farewell tour, was to continue with the name Zero Gravity but the promoters strongly recommended that Turilli and Lione continue with the name Rhapsody.

At the end of December 2018, Turilli and Lione entered the studio to record their band's only studio album Zero Gravity (Rebirth and Evolution), which was released on July 5, 2019. Following the conclusion of the Latin American tour in January and February 2023 as their final tour, the band disbanded, with an announcement prior that they would be "closing the chapter of their career for good".

After this, Lione formed Fabio Lione's Dawn of Victory, performing Rhapsody songs live alongside Leurquin, Guers, and Holzwarth.

== Band members ==
Final line-up

- Luca Turilli – lead and rhythm guitar, keyboards
- Fabio Lione – lead vocals
- Dominique Leurquin – rhythm and lead guitar
- Patrice Guers – bass
- Alex Holzwarth – drums

Live

- Michele Sanna – drums (2019)
- Fabio Alessandrini – drums (2023)

== Discography ==
=== Studio albums ===
- Zero Gravity (Rebirth and Evolution) (2019)

=== Singles ===
- "Phoenix Rising" (2019)
- "D.N.A. (Demon and Angel)" (2019)
- "Zero Gravity" (2019)

=== Music videos ===
- "Zero Gravity"
