= The 25th Hour (Vision Divine album) =

Studio album by Vision Divine
- Released: 4 June 2007
- Recorded: 2007
- Genres: Progressive metal Power metal
- Length: 49:49
- Label: Scarlet Records
- Producer: Timo Tolkki

Vision Divine chronology
The Perfect Machine (2005)	The 25th Hour (2007)	9 Degrees West Of The Moon (2009)

The 25th Hour is a studio album released by Italian band Vision Divine. The album is a conceptual work based on their past album Stream of Consciousness.

== Track listing ==
All music written by Carlo Andrea Magnani (Olaf Thorsen) and Michele Luppi, except where noted. All lyrics by Thorsen.

1. My Angel Died (music by Olaf Thorsen) - 0:53
2. The 25th Hour - 5:34
3. Out of a Distant Night (Voices) - 5:29
4. Alpha & Omega - 5:49
5. Eyes of a Child - 5:00
6. The Daemon You Hide - 4:50
7. Waiting for the Dawn (instrumental) (music by Olaf Thorsen) - 1:48
8. Essence of Time - 4:43
9. A Perfect Suicide (music by Cristiano Bertocchi and Michelle Luppi) - 5:21
10. Heaven Calling (music by Michelle Luppi) - 3:39
11. Ascension (music by Olaf Thorsen) - 2:15

Japanese edition bonus track

12. Another Day (Dream Theater cover) - 4:28

== Personnel ==
- Olaf Thorsen – guitar
- Michele Luppi – vocal
- Cristiano Bertocchi – bass
- Federico Puleri – guitar
- Alessio "Tom" Lucatti – keyboard
- Alessandro "Bix" Bissa – drums
