= Forgotten Tales =

Canadian power metal band

- Origin: Quebec City, Quebec, Canada
- Genre: Power metal
- Years active: 1999–2010; 2024–present
- Label: Union Métal International
- Members: Sonia Pineault; Martin Desharnais; Cedric Langlais; Xavier Gonthier Blouin; Marco Lavoie
- Past members: Cedric Prevost; Pat Vir; William Simard; Michel Belanger; Frederic Desroches

Forgotten Tales is a Canadian power metal band from Quebec City, Quebec, originally formed in 1999.

== Biography ==
=== Beginnings and The Promise (1999–2001) ===
Forgotten Tales was formed in Quebec City, in the province of Quebec, Canada, in October 1999, at the initiative of René Pineault. The goal was to introduce the power metal movement—which was already widespread in Europe at the time—to Canada Initially, Forgotten Tales was a cover band that focused on power metal hit songs. Its members had previously been involved in a local hard rock band called Cyclone, which released a self-titled album in 1995, including the track "Jeux d'enfants". Forgotten Tales played several sold-out shows before serving as the opening act for the Finnish band Nightwish during their visit to Montreal in November 2000. From that point on, the idea of producing an album of original material quickly took root within the band.

Forgotten Tales established itself as a full-fledged band in 2001. The lineup—comprising musicians Sonia Pineault (vocals), Martin Desharnais (guitar), Patrick Vir (bass), Cédric Prévost (drums), and Frédérick Desroches (keyboards)—delivers a sound rooted in the traditions of the Old World. The presence of a female vocalist in a male-dominated genre gives the band a distinct sound, blending metal with classical, baroque, and progressive influences. They stand out for their energy and speed, without ever compromising on musicality. In April 2001, the group entered the studio to record their debut album, *The Promise*, working with Quebec-based sound engineer Pierre Rémillard. The album was mixed at Studio Victor in Montreal. In October 2001, the band officially marked the release of their first album, *The Promise*, on the Canadian market.

=== All the Sinners (2002–2008) ===
Following numerous positive reviews from various media outlets—including websites, fanzines, radio stations, and specialized magazines—across the globe, the band turned their attention to composing their second album. In May 2002, the group served as the opening act for the German band Edguy during their stop in Quebec City. In November 2002, the band returned to the stage, this time alongside the power metal group Gamma Ray. In late October 2003, the ensemble entered the studio to record their second album, titled All the Sinners. They spent nearly six months at Studio Menzo in Quebec City, working with sound engineer Pierre Talbot to refine their music. The Japanese company M&I announced the official release of the album for 18 August 2004—two weeks ahead of its Canadian release—and included an additional, previously unreleased track, "Jeux d'enfants." Hellion Records handled the distribution of the album in Brazil.

Several shows took place in 2005 and 2006, featuring bands such as Kamelot, DragonForce, and Sonata Arctica. In 2007, the group served as the opening act for Hammerfall at the Festival d'été de Québec, where they also offered a preview of their upcoming album by performing the track "Howling at the Moon."

In 2008, René Pineault—lyricist for several songs on The Promise album, and the band's producer and manager since its inception—announced his departure from the music industry to pursue personal projects. This announcement was not widely publicized. He handed over his company, "Union Metal International," to his sister, Sonia Pineault, the band's lead singer, thereby ending his involvement with the group.

After an absence of several years, he returned in 2015 with an annual project called Power Nation, a tribute act dedicated to Power Metal music. For the third and fourth editions of the project, members of Forgotten Tales were invited to participate. Several videos of these performances are available on YouTube, featuring, among others, Martin Desharnais, Sonia Pineault, Marc-Olivier Lavoie, and former drummer Cédric Prévost. The project indirectly paved the way for the addition of Xavier Gonthier-Blouin (as the new drummer) and Cédric Langlais (as the new bassist) to the lineup of Forgotten Tales.

=== We Shall See the Light (2009-2011) ===
Since late 2009, the band has been in the studio recording their third album, We Shall See the Light. Several tracks are already known to fans, such as "Howling at the Moon," "We Shall See the Light," and "Keepers of the Field." According to the band members, the album was expected to be released around late October or early November 2010. In 2011, Forgotten Tales posted a clip online showing them at Lezarts Studio.

Forgotten Tales - Keepers of the Field
A clip from a track on We Shall See the Light illustrates Forgotten Tales's style of play.

=== Other Times (2026–present) ===
The band announced, after an extended hiatus, their fourth studio album, Other Times, their first release in 17 years. It is set to be released on February 12, 2027.

== Band members ==
Current

- Sonia Pineault – lead vocals
- Martin Desharnais – guitars, backing vocals
- Cedric Langlais – bass
- Xavier Gonthier Blouin – drums
- Marco Lavoie – guitars

Former

- Cédric Prévost – drums
- William Simard – keyboards
- Patrick Vir – bass
- Mike Bélanger – drums
- Frédéric Desroches – keyboards

== Discography ==
=== Studio albums ===
- The Promise (2001)
- All the Sinners (2004)
- We Shall See the Light (2010)
- Other Times (2027)
