= Send Me an Angel (album) =

Studio album by Vision Divine
- Released: 14 January 2002
- Genre: Progressive metal; power metal
- Length: 43:14
- Label: Atrheia
- Producer: Fabio Lione; Olaf Thörsen

Vision Divine chronology
Vision Divine (1999)	Send Me an Angel (2002)	Stream of Consciousness (2004)

Send Me an Angel is the second studio album by the Italian progressive power metal band Vision Divine released in 2002.

== Track listing ==
All lyrics are written by Olaf Thörsen except track 11 originally written by A-ha.; all music is composed by Fabio Lione (Tordiglione) and Olaf Thörsen (Magnani) except where noted.

No.	Title	Writer(s)	Length
1.	"Incipit" (Instrumental)	De Paoli	1:25
2.	"Send Me an Angel"		4:10
3.	"Pain"		4:39
4.	"Away From You" (Female vocal by Ale Gatti)		4:21
5.	"Black & White" (Female vocal by Ale Gatti)		4:50
6.	"The Call"		4:08
7.	"Taste of a Goodbye" (Second guitar by Stefano "Brando" Brandoni)		3:37
8.	"Apocalypse Coming"		4:14
9.	"Nemesis" (Instrumental)	De Paoli	3:14
10.	"Flame Of Hate" (Female voice by Stephanie Jackson, male voice by Steve Scott)		4:42
11.	"Take On Me" (A-ha cover)	Furuholmen, Harket, Waaktaar	3:45

== Credits ==
Lineup

- Fabio Lione - vocals
- Olaf Thörsen – guitars
- Andrea "Tower" Torricini – bass
- Andrew McPauls – keyboards
- Mat Stancioiu – drums

Others

- Simone Bianchi - Cover artwork
