= Vision Divine (album) =

Studio album by Vision Divine
- Released: 1999
- Genre: Progressive metal; power metal
- Length: 56:01
- Label: Atrheia Records
- Producer: Fabio Lione; Dave Rodgers; Olaf Thörsen

Vision Divine chronology
Vision Divine (1999)	Send Me an Angel (2002)

Vision Divine is the first studio album by the Italian progressive power metal band Vision Divine released in 1999.

== Track listing ==
All tracks are written by Fabio Lione (Tordiglione) and Olaf Thörsen (Magnani) except where noted.

No.	Title	Writer(s)	Length
1.	"New Eden"		04:03
2.	"On the Wings of the Storm"		04:40
3.	"Black Mask of Fear"		04:38
4.	"Exodus"		04:37
5.	"The Whisper"		06:03
6.	"Forgotten Worlds" (instrumental)	Andrea DePaoli	04:18
7.	"Vision Divine"		05:03
8.	"The Final Countdown" (Europe cover)	Joey Tempest	05:06
9.	"The Miracle"		06:20
10.	"Forever Young"		05:01
11.	"Of Light and Darkness"	Andrea DePaoli, Fabio Lione, Olaf Thörsen	06:12
Total length:			56:01

== Personnel ==
- Fabio Lione – vocals
- Olaf Thörsen – guitars
- Andrea Torricini – bass
- Andrea DePaoli – keyboards
- Mat Stancioiu – drums
