= Stream of Consciousness (Vision Divine album) =

Studio album by Vision Divine
- Released: 2004
- Genre: Progressive metal, power metal
- Length: 1:01:40
- Label: Metal Blade
- Producer: Olaf Thorsen; Oleg Smirnoff

Vision Divine chronology
Send Me an Angel (2002)	Stream of Consciousness (2004)	The Perfect Machine (2005)

Professional ratings
Review scores
Source	Rating
Allmusic	3/5 stars
Noise.fi	2/5 stars

Stream of Consciousness is a concept album by the Italian progressive power metal band Vision Divine. The album was released in 2004 on Metal Blade Records.

== Track listing ==
All music written by Olaf Thörsen (Magnani) and Oleg Smirnoff. All vocal melodies written by Fabio Lione (Tordiglione) except tracks 6 (refrain), 7 (verse), 8, 9, 10 & 14, written by Michele Luppi. All lyrics written by Olaf Thörsen.

1. "Chapter I: Stream of Unconsciousness" (0:59)
2. "Chapter II: The Secret Of Life" (5:09)
3. "Chapter III: Colours Of My World" (7:25)
4. "Chapter IV: In The Light" (Instrumental) (1:23)
5. "Chapter V: The Fallen Feather" (5:50)
6. "Chapter VI: La Vita Fugge" (4:30)
7. "Chapter VII: Versions Of The Same" (4:38)
8. "Chapter VIII: Through The Eyes Of God" (4:31)
9. "Chapter IX: Shades" (5:27)
10. "Chapter X: We Are, We Are Not" (5:35)
11. "Chapter XI: Fool's Garden" (Instrumental) (1:59)
12. "Chapter XII: The Fall Of Reason" (Instrumental) (1:50)
13. "Chapter XIII: Out Of The Maze" (6:28)
14. "Chapter XIV: Identities" (5:36)

== Personnel ==
- Michele Luppi - vocals
- Olaf Thörsen - guitars
- Oleg Smirnoff - keyboards
- Andrea "Tower" Torricini - bass
- Matteo Amoroso - drums
