= Ancient Bards =

Italian symphonic power metal band

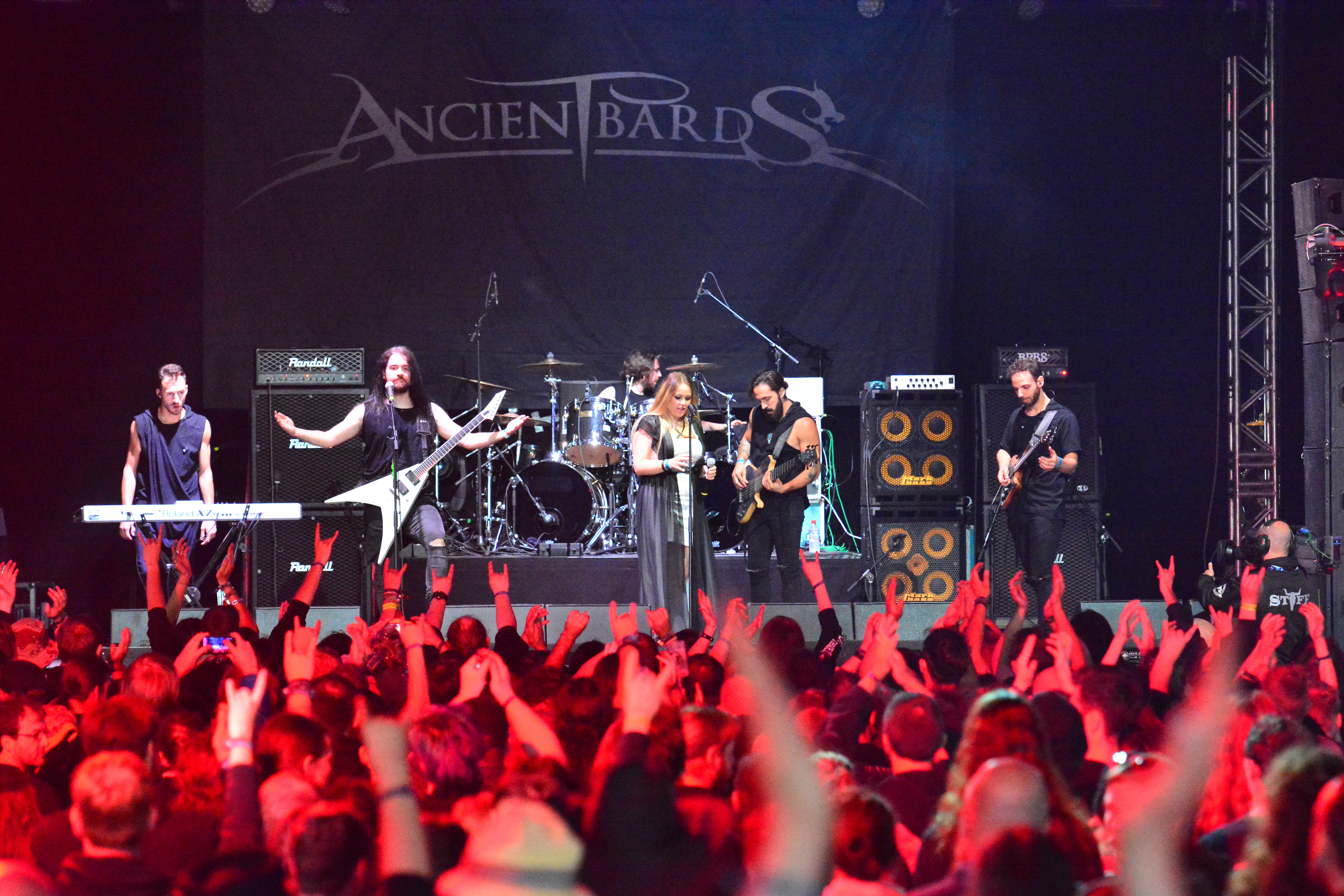
- Ancient Bards at Wacken Open Air 2015

Background information
- Origin: Italy
- Genres: Symphonic metal, power metal
- Years active: 2006–present
- Label: Limb Music
- Members: Martino Garattoni; Federico Gatti; Daniele Mazza; Claudio Pietronik; Sara Squadrani; Simone Bertozzi
- Past members: Alessandro Carichini; Fabio Balducci
- Website: www.ancientbards.com

Ancient Bards is an Italian symphonic power metal band formed in January 2006 by keyboard player Daniele Mazza.

== History ==
=== Line-Up ===
The project started in 2006 after Mazza met bass player Martino Garattoni. The first stable line up was completed in 2007, with Sara Squadrani as singer, Alessandro Carichini as drummer, and Claudio Pietronik and Fabio Balducci as guitarists.

In September 2010, Carichini left the band, to be replaced with drummer Federico Gatti. At the end of 2013, after recording their third album, A New Dawn Ending, Balducci left the band for personal reasons. For live shows in 2014, Simone Bertozzi filled in as a guest second guitarist.

=== Albums ===
The style and concept of their 2010 debut album, The Alliance of the Kings, has been seen as inspired by fellow Italian band Rhapsody of Fire. The album is the first part of The Black Crystal Sword Saga with each song making up a single "episode".

The Italian and German editions of Metal Hammer commented on the "sophisticated songwriting" in this release. The latter magazine also found similarities to Anette Olzon in singer Sara Squadrani's voice.

The band's second album, Soulless Child, was released in 2011. It continues The Black Crystal Sword Saga introduced in the previous album. The reviewers of Metal Hammer Germany and Rock Hard agreed that the album had a tendency towards kitsch. While Metal Hammer found several positive remarks about individual tracks, Rock Hard criticised a lack of original hooks.

In April 2014, a third album, A New Dawn Ending, was released. This concluded the first part of The Black Crystal Sword Saga, making that section a complete trilogy.

Ancient Bards announced their fourth album in June 2018 entitled Origine - The Black Crystal Sword Saga Part 2. It is the beginning the second part of The Black Crystal Sword Saga and was released on 25 January 2019. They also announced on their Facebook page that touring guitarist Simone Bartozzi had been made a permanent band member after touring with them since 2014.

== Band members ==
Current

- Daniele Mazza – keyboards (2006–present)
- Martino Garattoni – bass (2006–present)
- Sara Squadrani – vocals (2007–present)
- Claudio Pietronik – guitar (2007–present)
- Federico Gatti – drums (2011–present)
- Simone Bertozzi – guitar (2018–present; touring member 2014–2018)

Former

- Alessandro Carichini – drums (2007–2010)
- Fabio Balducci – guitar (2007–2014)

Timeline

== Discography ==
Studio albums

- The Alliance of the Kings (2010)
- Soulless Child (2011)
- A New Dawn Ending (2014)
- Origine - The Black Crystal Sword Saga Part 2 (2019)
- Artifex (2025)

EPs

- Trailer of the Black Crystal Sword Saga (2008)

== See also ==
- List of power metal bands
- List of symphonic metal bands
- Music of Italy
