= The Perfect Machine =

Studio album by Vision Divine
- Released: 2005
- Genres: Progressive metal, power metal
- Length: 52:16
- Label: Scarlet Records
- Producer: Timo Tolkki

Vision Divine chronology
| Stream of Consciousness (2004) | The Perfect Machine (2005) | The 25th Hour (2007) |

Professional ratings
Review scores
| Source | Rating |
|---|---|
| Noise.fi | 3/5 stars |

The Perfect Machine is a 2005 album by Vision Divine. It is a concept album dealing with a scientist who is able to put an end to death and disease for all mankind, and thus make the human race immortal. The story considers the social and religious aspects of what such a discovery could bring.

== Track listing ==
All music written by Carlo Andrea Magnani (Olaf Thorsen), Oleg Smirnoff and Michele Luppi. All lyrics by Thorsen.

1. The Perfect Machine – 7:58
2. 1st Day Of A Never-ending Day – 6:13
3. The Ancestors' Blood – 5:53
4. Land Of Fear – 4:25
5. God Is Dead – 5:21
6. Rising Sun – 5:23
7. Here In 6048 – 6:32
8. The River – 4:29
9. Now That You've Gone – 5:59

Japanese edition bonus track

10. The Needle Lies (Queensrÿche cover) – 3:00

== Personnel ==
- Olaf Thorsen – guitars
- Federico Puleri – guitars
- Michele Luppi – vocals
- Oleg Smirnoff – keyboards, piano
- Andrea "Tower" Torricini – bass
- Danil Morini – drums
