= NEMS Enterprises (label) =

Argentinean record label

Nems Enterprises
- Founded: 1987
- Founder: Marcelo Cabuli
- Genre: Heavy metal
- Official website: http://www.nems.com.ar

NEMS Enterprises is a metal Latin-American record label led by the Argentinian businessman Marcelo Cabuli founded in 1987 as a CD and vinyl distribution company. In 1995 Nems turned into a label company. The first band they signed was Angra. Nems also organized shows.

Marcelo Cabuli is married to Tarja Turunen.

== Artists ==
The label produced albums by:

- Angra
- Nepal

The label licensed recordings (to distribute them in South America) by:

- Heavens Gate
- Saxon
- Gamma Ray
- Stratovarius
- Royal Hunt
- King Diamond
- Amorphis
- Manowar
- Helloween
- Nightwish
- Motörhead (Snake Bite Love album)
- Blackmore's Night
- Blind Guardian
- Tarja Turunen

== See also ==
- List of record labels
