= Vision Divine =

Italian metal band

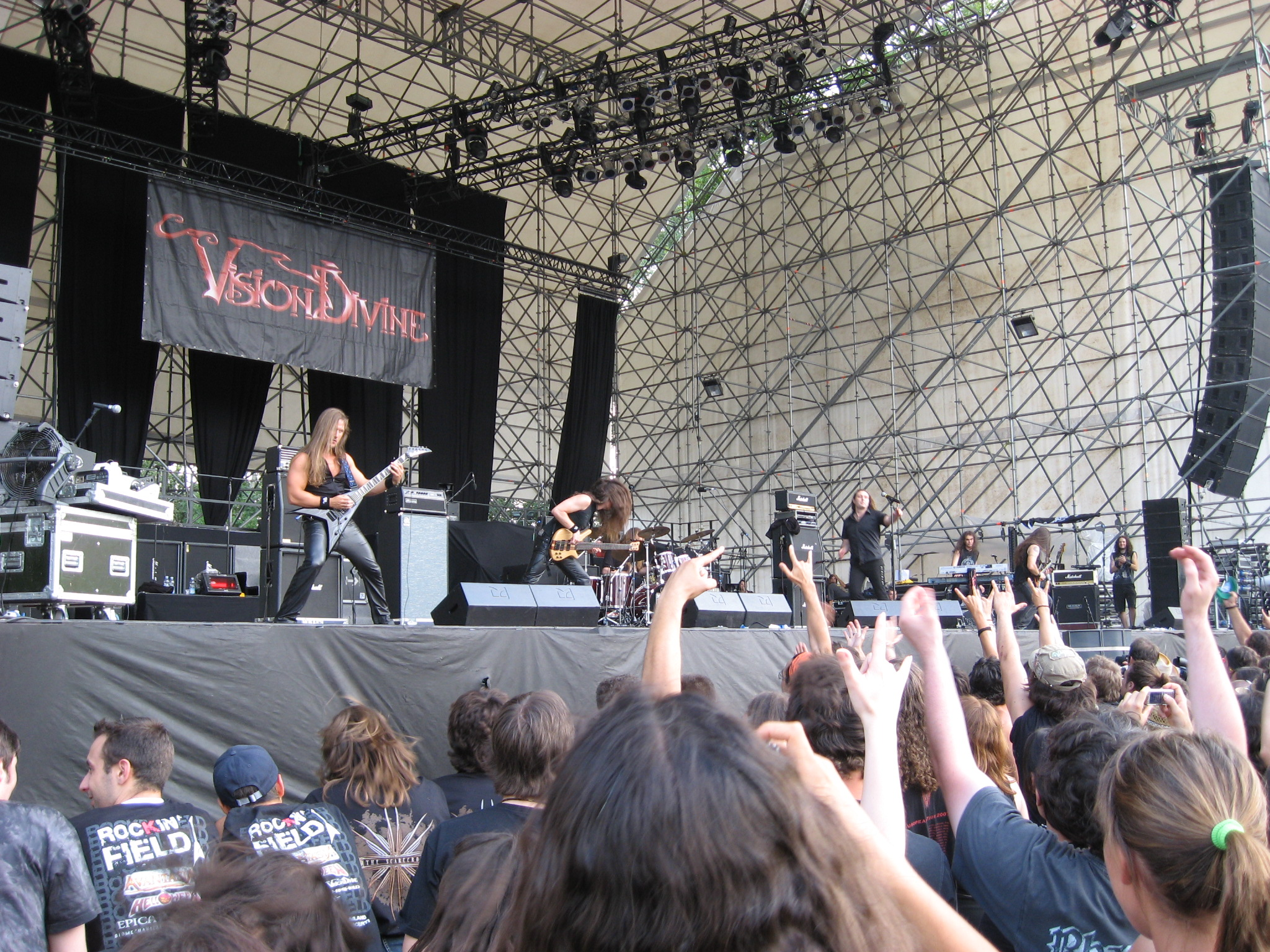
- Vision Divine at Rockin' field festival 2008 (Idroscalo, Milan)

Background information
- Origin: Italy
- Genres: Power metal, progressive metal
- Years active: 1998–present
- Labels: Scarlet, King, Metal Blade, Frontier
- Spinoff of: Labyrinth
- Members: Olaf Thörsen; Andrea "Tower" Torricini; Michele Luppi; Oleg Smirnoff; Matt Peruzzi
- Past members: Fabio Lione; Federico Puleri; Alessio Lucatti; Alessandro Bissa; Cristiano Bertocchi; Andrew McPauls; Mat Stancioiu; Ricky Quagliato; Matteo Amoroso; Danil Morini; Mike Terrana; Ivan Giannini
- Website: visiondivine.com

Vision Divine is an Italian power/progressive metal band formed in 1998.

== History ==
Originally a solo project from Olaf Thörsen (born Carlo Andrea Magnani). Soon, Fabio Lione rejoined him after the first Labyrinth period ("No Limits"), and then what was supposed to be a solo project quickly turns into a band, taking its new name from Labyrinth's previous name ("Vision") and from the title that was supposed to be given to Olaf's first solo album ("Divine"). Completing the line up Mat Stancioiu (drums), Andrew McPauls (keyboards) and Andrea "Tower" Torricini (bass).

In its first three years, the band released two albums and started touring (South American Tour in December 2000), where for the first time an Italian heavy metal band got the chance to play (and sold-out) in countries like Argentina, Chile, Brazil, Panama and Mexico.

In 2001, the band started writing and recording the new album, titled "Send Me An Angel", that was released in January 2002. At the end of the same year, Olaf decided to leave Labyrinth, to focus just on Vision and also deciding to stop any rumours from some magazine, pretending to consider Vision as nothing but a "side project". For the same reason Andrew and Mat split from the band and were replaced by Oleg Smirnoff at keyboards (ex-Eldritch) and Matteo Amoroso at drums (ex-Athena). In 2003, the band started the songwriting for the third album, when Fabio started having some problem regarding the co-existence of his career and Vision Divine related duties. After a few months, they mutually agreed to split. They then proceeded to add new singer Michele Luppi, a vocalist with a previous experience in live performances. With this new line-up they completed the final songs for the album that was to be titled "Stream of Consciousness". The album was released in April 2004.

With a brand new line-up and with renewed ambitions the band canceled any previous deal, deciding to join Scarlet Records for the Italian territory, King Records for the Japanese territory and Metal Blade for the rest of the world. In 2005, the band released "The Perfect Machine", which was recorded at Goldenworks Mixing Suite studio and produced by Stratovarius' leader Timo Tolkki.

In 2006, Andrea "Tower" Torricini left the band for not being able to guarantee full-time dedication to the band, and Cristiano Bertocchi replaced him. By September, "The Perfect Machine", according to their website "was immediately described as one of the best Italian metal releases ever, becoming one of Scarlet's all time best-sellers". A new digipack was released containing four bonus tracks. Also, Riccardo "Ricky" Quaggliatto left the band due to personal problems, replaced by new drummer Alessandro Bissa.

In 2007, Vision Divine recorded their album, "The 25th Hour", along with Timo Tolkki and Alessandro Bissa in New Sin Studios. It was released on 29 June 2007.

In April 2008, Vision Divine announced Michele Luppi is no longer singing with Vision Divine, and in May 2008 Olaf Thörsen announced that Fabio Lione rejoined the band as a full-time vocalist.

Vision Divine released their sixth album, 9 Degrees West of the Moon, on 23 January 2009, the first with Lione on vocals after Michele Luppi's departure.

In 2012, Vision Divine signed with EarMusic/Edel Group Records and released their seventh studio album entitled "Destination Set to Nowhere" on 14 September 2012.

In 2016, the band announced drummer Alessandro Bissa decided to peacefully part ways and announced Mike Terrana as the new member.

On 28 April 2018, Fabio announced his second departure from the band. In December 2018, the band hired formed Derdian singer Ivan Giannini as new lead vocalist. They released their first single called "Angel of Revenge" on 9 December 2018.

On 19 August 2019, the band announced the new album "When All The Heroes Are Dead" on its social media accounts. The artwork of the album was created by Federico Mondelli, whose bands are signed under Scarlet Records just like Vision Divine.

After playing shows all around the world, the band returned to the studio in summer 2022 to work on two new albums. The songwriting of the first one was finished one year later, and the recordings are scheduled before the end of 2023.

In 2025, Vision Divine announced the return of Michele Luppi on lead vocals for a new album and tour. A month later it was announced the departure of keyboard player Alessio Lucatti from the band. In July 2025, the band announced the return of former keyboardist Oleg Smirnoff.

== Members ==
=== Current members ===
- Olaf Thörsen – guitars (1998–present)
- Andrea "Tower" Torricini – bass (1999–2006, 2012–present)
- Oleg Smirnoff – keyboards (2002–2005, 2025–present)
- Michele Luppi – vocals (2003–2008, 2025–present)
- Matt Peruzzi – drums (2022–present)

=== Former members ===
- Fabio Lione – vocals (1998–2003, 2008–2018)
- Federico "Pule" Puleri – guitars (2002–2026)
- Andrew Mc Pauls – keyboards (1999–2002)
- Mat Stancioiu – drums (1999–2002)
- Matteo Amoroso – drums (2003–2005)
- Danil Morini – drums (2005) (session musician)
- Ricky Quagliato – drums (2005–2006)
- Alessio Lucatti – keyboards (2006–2025)
- Alessandro "Bix" Bissa – drums (2006–2016)
- Cristiano Bertocchi – bass (2006–2012)
- Mike Terrana – drums (2016–2022)
- Ivan Giannini – vocals (2018–2024)

== Discography ==
=== Albums ===
- 1999 – Vision Divine
- 2002 – Send Me an Angel
- 2004 – Stream of Consciousness
- 2005 – The Perfect Machine
- 2007 – The 25th Hour
- 2009 – 9 Degrees West of the Moon
- 2012 – Destination Set to Nowhere
- 2019 – When All the Heroes Are Dead
- 2024 – Blood and Angels' Tears

=== Demos and EPs ===
- 1999 – Symmetry – The Official Demo series Vol 3
- 2002 – Colours of My World
- 2026 – A Clockwork Reverie

=== Videos ===
- 2005 – Stage of Consciousness
