= Magnum discography =

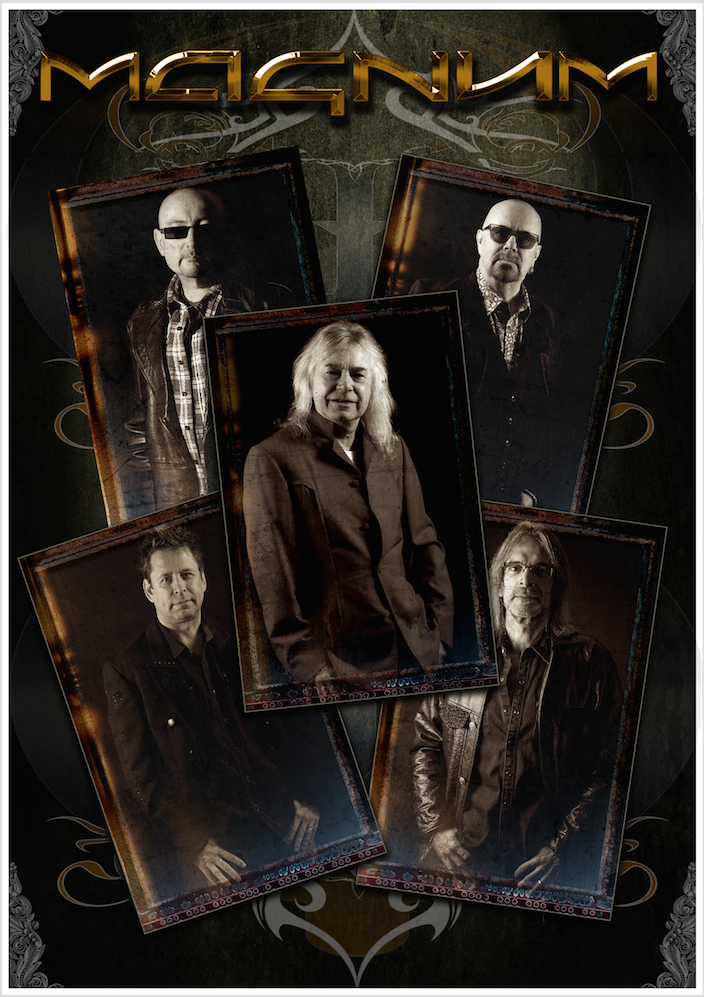
- Studio albums: 23
- Live albums: 9
- Compilation albums: 10
- Singles: 24
- Video albums: 12

The following is the discography of the British hard rock band Magnum, which is headed by vocalist Bob Catley and, until his death, guitarist/songwriter Tony Clarkin. Originally formed around 1972 they released their first single in 1975 (a cover of Sweets for My Sweet that did not chart) and their first album Kingdom of Madness in 1978. They continued recording and releasing albums until 1995 when they split. However, they re-formed in 2001 and have released albums every few years since. Many compilations and live albums were released in the gap, as well as Bob and Tony forming Hard Rain before re-forming Magnum with long-time keyboard player Mark Stanway.

== Studio albums ==
| Title | Album details | Peak chart positions | | | | | | | | Certifications |
| Title | Album details | AUT | GER | NOR | SWE | SWI | UK | UK IND | UK Rock | Certifications |
|---|---|---|---|---|---|---|---|---|---|---|
| Kingdom of Madness | Released: August 1978; Label: Jet | — | — | — | — | — | 58 | — | — | |
| Magnum II | Released: October 1979; Label: Jet | — | — | — | — | — | — | — | — | |
| Chase the Dragon | Released: February 1982; Label: Jet | — | — | — | — | — | 17 | — | — | |
| The Eleventh Hour | Released: May 1983; Label: Jet | — | — | — | — | — | 38 | — | — | |
| On a Storyteller's Night | Released: May 13, 1985; Label: Polydor | — | — | — | 44 | — | 24 | — | — | UK: Gold |
| Vigilante | Released: September 26, 1986; Label: Polydor | — | 59 | — | 16 | — | 24 | — | — | |
| Wings of Heaven | Released: March 28, 1988; Label: Polydor | — | 19 | 8 | 2 | 7 | 5 | — | — | UK: Silver |
| Goodnight L.A. | Released: July 1990; Label: Polydor | — | 21 | 15 | 7 | 12 | 9 | — | — | |
| Sleepwalking | Released: October 1992; Label: Music for Nations | — | 67 | — | 29 | — | 27 | — | — | |
| Keeping the Nite Light Burning | Released: November 1993; Label: Jet | — | — | — | — | — | — | — | — | |
| Rock Art | Released: June 1994; Label: EMI | — | 83 | — | 24 | 31 | 57 | — | — | |
| Breath of Life | Released: February 25, 2002; Label: SPV Steamhammer | — | 67 | — | — | — | — | — | 14 | |
| Brand New Morning | Released: August 2004; Label: SPV Steamhammer | — | 60 | — | — | — | — | — | 13 | |
| Princess Alice and the Broken Arrow | Released: March 26, 2007; Label: SPV Steamhammer | — | 60 | — | — | — | 70 | — | 4 | |
| Into the Valley of the Moonking | Released: June 15, 2009; Label: SPV Steamhammer | — | 59 | — | 41 | 59 | 82 | 8 | 2 | |
| The Visitation | Released: January 14, 2011; Label: SPV Steamhammer | — | 19 | — | 28 | 56 | 55 | 5 | 3 | |
| On the 13th Day | Released: September 21, 2012; Label: SPV Steamhammer | — | 28 | — | 29 | 47 | 43 | 5 | 3 | |
| Escape from the Shadow Garden | Released: March 19, 2014; Label: SPV Steamhammer | — | 14 | — | 19 | 22 | 38 | 4 | 2 | |
| Sacred Blood "Divine" Lies | Released: February 26, 2016; Label: SPV Steamhammer | 57 | 20 | — | 23 | 26 | 31 | 6 | 2 | |
| Lost on the Road to Eternity | Released: January 19, 2018; Label: SPV Steamhammer | 22 | 8 | — | 23 | 8 | 15 | 1 | 7 | |
| The Serpent Rings | Released: January 17, 2020; Label: SPV Steamhammer | 47 | 5 | — | 29 | 7 | 36 | 4 | 1 | |
| The Monster Roars | Released: January 14, 2022; Label: SPV Steamhammer | 34 | 5 | — | 29 | 7 | 51 | 4 | 2 | |
| Here Comes the Rain | Released: January 12, 2024; Label: SPV Steamhammer | 3 | 2 | — | 23 | 4 | 68 | 4 | 1 | |
"—" denotes releases that did not chart or were not released in that territory.

== Live albums ==
| Year | Title | Label | Peak chart positions | | |
| Year | Title | Label | UK | GER | SWI |
|---|---|---|---|---|---|
| 1980 | Marauder | Jet Records | 34 | — | — |
| 1989 | Invasion Live | Receiver Records | — | — | — |
| 1991 | The Spirit | Polydor Records | 50 | — | — |
| 1996 | The Last Dance | SPV | — | — | — |
| 1997 | Stronghold | Receiver Records | — | — | — |
| 2000 | Days of Wonder | Zoom Club | — | — | — |
| 2004 | The River Sessions | River Records | — | — | — |
| 2008 | Wings of Heaven Live | SPV | 198 | — | — |
| 2015 | Escape from the Shadow Garden – Live 2014 | SPV Steamhammer | 91 | 82 | — |
| 2019 | Live at the Symphony Hall | SPV Steamhammer | — | 18 | 33 |
| 2025 | Live At KK's Steel Mill | SPV Steamhammer | — | 13 | 17 |

== Compilation albums ==
| Date of release | Title | Label |
|---|---|---|
| 1986 | Anthology | Castle Communications |
| 1987 | Mirador | FM Records |
| 1990 | Foundation | FM Records |
| 1993 | Archive | Jet Records |
| 1993 | Chapter & Verse: The Very Best of Magnum | Polydor Records |
| 1998 | Road to Paradise | Sanctuary Records |
| 2002 | Long Days, Black Nights | Sanctuary Records |
| 2010 | The Gathering | Sanctuary Records |
| 2011 | Evolution | SPV Steamhammer |
| 2017 | The Valley of Tears – The Ballads | SPV Steamhammer |
| 2021 | Dance of the Black Tattoo | SPV Steamhammer |

There have also been many other compilations across various labels.

== Singles and EPs ==
| Year | Single | Peak chart positions | Album |
| Year | Single | UK | Album |
|---|---|---|---|
| 1975 | "Sweets for My Sweet" | - | Non-album single |
| 1978 | "Kingdom of Madness" | - | Kingdom of Madness |
| 1978 | "Universe" | - | Kingdom of Madness |
| 1979 | "Baby Rock Me" (Note: released in the US) | - | Kingdom of Madness |
| 1979 | "Changes" | - | Magnum II |
| 1979 | "Foolish Heart" | - | Magnum II |
| 1980 | Magnum Live EP | 47 | EP |
| 1980 | "Changes" (remix) | - | Non-album single |
| 1982 | "The Lights Burned Out" | - | Chase the Dragon |
| 1982 | "Back to Earth" | - | Non-album single |
| 1985 | "Just Like an Arrow" | 83 | On a Storyteller's Night |
| 1985 | "On a Storyteller's Night" | - | On a Storyteller's Night |
| 1986 | "Lonely Night" | 70 | Vigilante |
| 1986 | "Midnight (You Won't Be Sleeping)" | 91 | Vigilante |
| 1987 | "When the World Comes Down" | 96 | Vigilante |
| 1987 | "Need a Lot of Love" (Note: released in Germany and France) | - | Vigilante |
| 1988 | "Days of No Trust" | 32 | Wings of Heaven |
| 1988 | "Start Talking Love" | 22 | Wings of Heaven |
| 1988 | "It Must Have Been Love" | 33 | Wings of Heaven |
| 1990 | "Rockin' Chair" | 27 | Goodnight L.A. |
| 1990 | "Heartbroke and Busted" | 49 | Goodnight L.A. |
| 1990 | The Early Years Live | - | EP |
| 1992 | "Only in America" | - | Sleepwalking |
| 1994 | "Tall Ships" | - | Rock Art |
| 1994 | "Back in Your Arms Again" | - | Rock Art |

== Videos and DVDs ==
| Date of Release | Title | Date/Place of Recording | Format |
|---|---|---|---|
| 1985 | Live! – The Sacred Hour | 1985 Camden Palace | VHS |
| 1985 | On a Storyteller's Night | 1985 | VHS |
| 1988 | On the Wings of Heaven Live | 26 March 1988 Hammersmith Odeon | VHS & Laserdisc |
| 1990 | From Midnight to L.A. | - | VHS |
| 1993 | Chapter & Verse (originally available as From Midnight to L.A. with three extra tracks from Wings of Heaven) | - | VHS |
| 2003 | A Winter's Tale | December 1992 Birmingham Town Hall | DVD, Stereo |
| 2004 | Live Legends (Surround sound version of A Winter's Tale) | December 1992 Birmingham Town Hall | DVD, Dolby Digital and DTS 5.1 Surround |
| 2004 | Live at Birmingham plus "Another Chapter, Another Verse" documentary | 22 December 1992; Birmingham Town Hall | DVD |
| 2005 | Live in London | 3 May 1985 Camden Palace | DVD |
| 2005 | Livin' the Dream | 2005 UK | DVD |
