= Foundation (Magnum album) =

Box set by Magnum
- Released: May 1990
- Recorded: 1978–1985
- Length: Disc 1: 39:36; Disc 2: 40:33; Disc 3: 35:19; Disc 4: 39:38; Disc 5: 45:49; Disc 6: 70:10
- Label: FM Records
- Producer: Jake Commander; Leo Lyons; Jeff Glixman; Tony Clarkin; Kit Woolven

Magnum chronology
Invasion Live (1989)	Foundation (1990)	Goodnight L.A. (1990)

Foundation is a box set by the English rock band Magnum. It was released in 1990 by FM Records.

== Track listing ==
All Tracks written by Tony Clarkin.

=== Disc 1: Kingdom of Madness ===
1. "In the Beginning" — 7:52
2. "Baby Rock Me" — 4:05
3. "Universe" — 3:45
4. "Kingdom of Madness" — 4:25
5. "All That Is Real" — 3:48
6. "Bringer" — 3:58
7. "Invasion" — 3:22
8. "Lords of Chaos" — 3:21
9. "All Come Together" — 4:53

=== Disc 2: Magnum II ===
1. "Great Adventure" — 4:54
2. "Changes" — 3:15
3. "The Battle" — 2:10
4. "If I Could Live Forever" — 4:02
5. "Reborn" — 5:45
6. "So Cold the Night" — 4:04
7. "Foolish Heart" — 3:13
8. "Stayin' Alive" — 3:22
9. "Firebird" — 4:47
10. "All of My Life" — 4:43

=== Disc 3: Chase the Dragon ===
1. "Soldier of the Line" — 4:16
2. "On the Edge of the World" — 4:22
3. "The Spirit" — 4:17
4. "Sacred Hour" — 5:35
5. "Walking the Straight Line" — 4:53
6. "We All Play the Game" — 4:07
7. "The Teacher" — 3:21
8. "The Lights Burned Out" — 4:32

=== Disc 4: The Eleventh Hour ===
1. "The Prize" — 3:39
2. "Breakdown" — 3:59
3. "The Great Disaster" — 3:46
4. "Vicious Companions" — 3:36
5. "So Far Away" — 4:35
6. "Hit and Run" — 3:39
7. "One Night of Passion" — 3:48
8. "The Word" — 4:54
9. "Young and Precious Souls" — 4:03
10. "Road to Paradise" — 3:30

=== Disc 5: On a Storyteller's Night ===
1. "How Far Jerusalem" — 6:25
2. "Just Like an Arrow" — 3:22
3. "On a Storyteller's Night" — 4:59
4. "Before First Light" — 3:52
5. "Les Mort Dansant" — 5:47
6. "Endless Love" — 4:30
7. "Two Hearts" — 4:24
8. "Steal Your Heart" — 3:59
9. "All England's Eyes" — 4:47
10. "The Last Dance" — 3:39

=== Disc 6: Mirador ===
1. "Just Like An Arrow" — 3:22
2. "Soldier of the Line" — 4:16
3. "Changes" — 3:15
4. "Sacred Hour" — 5:35
5. "Great Adventure" — 4:54
6. "The Lights Burned Out" — 4:32
7. "In the Beginning" — 7:52
8. "How Far Jerusalem" — 6:25
9. "The Spirit" — 4:17
10. "The Word" — 4:54
11. "The Prize" — 3:39
12. "Kingdom of Madness" — 4:25
13. "If I Could Live Forever" — 4:02
14. "Lords of Chaos" — 3:21
15. "On a Storyteller's Night" — 4:59

== Cover sleeve ==
The cover art was designed by Rodney Matthews.

"Foundation was produced at the request of Paul Birch for the cover of a Magnum boxed set, containing the albums Kingdom Of Madness, Magnum II, Chase The Dragon, The Eleventh Hour, On A Storyteller's Night and Mirador. The idea was to include items from each album in the design: the stag from Mirador, the city from Chase The Dragon, my dog Patch from On A Storyteller's Night, and so on. The box contained a poster and an illustrated booklet. The title Foundation was my own contribution, as was the man with the hat (Tony Clarkin ploughing his way through the difficulties of a life in rock!)." — Rodney Matthews

== Personnel ==
- Tony Clarkin — guitar
- Bob Catley — vocals
- Wally Lowe — bass guitar
- Richard Bailey — keyboards, flute
- Kex Gorin — drums
- Mark Stanway — keyboards
- Jim Simpson — drums

Additional musicians

- Mo Birch — backing vocals (on "Les Mort Dansant")
