= Mirador (Magnum album) =

Compilation album by Magnum
- Released: November 1987
- Recorded: 1978–1985
- Length: 70:10
- Label: FM Records
- Producers: Jake Commander, Leo Lyons, Jeff Glixman, Tony Clarkin, Kit Woolven

Magnum chronology
Vigilante (1986)	Mirador (1987)	Wings of Heaven (1988)

Professional ratings
Review scores
Source	Rating
Best Ever Albums	75/100

Mirador is a compilation album by the English rock band Magnum. It was released in November 1987 by FM Records.

Released before FM Records released Magnum's back catalogue, this compilation contains material from the albums Kingdom of Madness, Magnum II, Chase the Dragon, The Eleventh Hour and On a Storyteller's Night.

== Background ==
Mirador was released by FM Records before the reissue of Magnum's existing back catalogue. It features selected tracks from five of the band's albums: Kingdom of Madness, Magnum II, Chase the Dragon, The Eleventh Hour, and On a Storyteller's Night.

The LP, released in 1987, contains ten tracks. Side one features "Just Like an Arrow", "Soldier of the Line", "Changes", "Sacred Hour", and "Great Adventure", while side two contains "How Far Jerusalem", "The Spirit", "The Word", "The Prize", and "Kingdom of Madness".

The CD edition adds five tracks to the ten featured on the LP: "The Lights Burned Out", "In the Beginning", "If I Could Live Forever", "Lords of Chaos", and "On a Storyteller's Night", bringing the total to 15 tracks. The CD has a total running time of approximately 70 minutes.

== Cover art ==
The cover art was created by English illustrator Rodney Matthews. The illustration was originally designed in 1981 for a poster for Pace Minerva. Matthews drew inspiration from a deer illustration painted by his father and landscape photographs of the Himalayas. In the same year, FM Records acquired the rights to use the illustration for the cover of Mirador. It was later also featured in Matthews's 1983 calendar.

== Track listing ==
All tracks are written by Tony Clarkin.

Original 1987 release
No.	Title	Length
1.	"Just Like an Arrow"	3:22
2.	"Soldier of the Line"	4:16
3.	"Changes"	3:15
4.	"Sacred Hour"	5:35
5.	"Great Adventure"	4:54
6.	"The Lights Burned Out"	4:32
7.	"In the Beginning"	7:52
8.	"How Far Jerusalem"	6:25
9.	"The Spirit"	4:17
10.	"The Word"	4:54
11.	"The Prize"	3:39
12.	"Kingdom of Madness"	4:25
13.	"If I Could Live Forever"	4:02
14.	"Lords of Chaos"	3:21
15.	"On a Storyteller's Night"	4:59

== Track listing, 1987 vinyl ==
Side one
No.	Title	Length
1.	"Just Like an Arrow"	3:22
2.	"Soldier of the Line"	5:35
3.	"Changes"	3:15
4.	"Sacred Hour"	5:35
5.	"Great Adventure"	4:54

Side two
No.	Title	Length
6.	"How Far Jerusalem"	6:25
7.	"The Spirit"	4:17
8.	"The Word"	4:54
9.	"The Prize"	3:39
10.	"Kingdom of Madness"	4:25

== Cover sleeve ==
The cover art was designed by Rodney Matthews.

== Personnel ==
- Tony Clarkin — guitar
- Bob Catley — vocals
- Wally Lowe — bass guitar
- Richard Bailey — keyboards, flute
- Kex Gorin — drums
- Mark Stanway — keyboards
- Jim Simpson — drums
