= Marauder (Magnum album) =

Live album by Magnum
- Released: April 1980
- Recorded: 15 December 1979
- Venue: The Marquee Club, London
- Length: 35:47
- Label: Jet
- Producer: Leo Lyons

Magnum chronology
Magnum II (1979)	Marauder (1980)	Chase the Dragon (1982)

Professional ratings
Review scores
Source	Rating
AllMusic	1/5 stars

Marauder is a live album by the English rock band Magnum. It was released in 1980 on Jet Records. Magnum recorded Marauder over one night at London's Marquee Club on 15 December 1979. It was an attempt by Jet Records to revive the success of the debut album Kingdom of Madness following the failure of Magnum II. The album was recorded on multi-track by former-Ten Years After bass player Leo Lyons, who had recorded Magnum II, and mixed by Chris Tsangarides.

The eight-track live album was released in April 1980, entering the UK charts at No. 34. A four-track EP preceded the album's release in March 1980, called Live at the Marquee, featuring material from the same show. The EP charted within the Top 50 of the UK singles chart, and very nearly earned the band an appearance on Top of the Pops. Following this revival, "Changes" was re-released as a single, although in a remixed format. The 2005 expanded version of the album was reissued on 22 September 2006 in Japan with Mini LP/paper sleeve packaging through Arcangelo. The album was also included in a limited edition Japanese box set, comprising all six of Sanctuary Records expanded and remastered releases with Mini LP/Paper Sleeve packaging. The set included an outer box featuring Magnum's Chase The Dragon artwork.

== Track listing ==
All tracks are written by Tony Clarkin.

Original 1980 Release
No.	Title	Original album	Length
1.	"If I Could Live Forever"	Magnum II	4:07
2.	"The Battle"	Magnum II	2:21
3.	"Foolish Heart"	Magnum II	3:08
4.	"In the Beginning"	Kingdom of Madness	7:57
5.	"Reborn"	Magnum II	5:59
6.	"Changes"	Magnum II	3:51
7.	"So Cold the Night"	Magnum II	4:33
8.	"Lords of Chaos"	Kingdom of Madness	3:48

2005 Expanded Edition
No.	Title	Original album	Length
9.	"All of My Life" (taken from Live at The Marquee EP)	Magnum II	6:17
10.	"Great Adventure" (taken from Live at The Marquee EP)	Magnum II	4:24
11.	"Invasion" (taken from Live at The Marquee EP)	Kingdom of Madness	3:55
12.	"Kingdom of Madness" (taken from Live at The Marquee EP)	Kingdom of Madness	4:10
13.	"Reborn" (taken from Invasion Live)	Magnum II	5:38
14.	"Changes" (taken from Invasion Live)	Magnum II	3:13
15.	"All of My Life" (taken from Invasion Live)	Magnum II	6:13
16.	"Invasion" (taken from Invasion Live)	Kingdom of Madness	5:10
17.	"Kingdom of Madness" (taken from Invasion Live)	Kingdom of Madness	3:57

== Reissues ==
Date of Release	Formats	Label	Catalogue number	Notes
04/80	LP	Jet Records	JETLP230	
03/87	LP, CD	Castle Communications	CLALP124, CLACD124	
08/99	CD	Castle Essentials	ESMCD749	
10/05	CD	Sanctuary Records	CMQDD1230	Remastered and Expanded with Bonus Tracks
2020/2021	LP	Renaissance Records US	RDEG-LP-886	

== Bonus tracks ==
Sanctuary Records released a 2005 Remastered and Expanded edition with a Bonus Tracks.

"All of My Life", "Great Adventure", "Invasion" and "Kingdom of Madness" (Disc 1, 9 – 12)
These tracks are taken from the EP "Live at the Marquee", recorded from the Marauder show at The Marquee, London, thus offering the show in its entirety.

"Reborn", "Changes", "All of My Life", "Invasion" and "Kingdom of Madness" (Disc 1, 13 – 17)
These tracks were recorded live in 1982 in Nashville, Tennessee whilst supporting Ozzy Osbourne. These tracks were originally released on Invasion Live.

== Singles ==
Live at the Marquee 7" (March 1980)

1. "All of My Life" [Live] – 6:17
2. "Great Adventure" [Live] – 4:24

Live at the Marquee EP (March 1980)

1. "All of My Life" [Live] – 6:17
2. "Great Adventure" [Live] – 4:24
3. "Invasion" [Live] – 5:10
4. "Kingdom of Madness" [Live] – 3:57

Changes 7" (1980)

1. "Changes" [Remix] – 4:11
2. "Everybody Needs" [B-Side] – 2:52
3. "Changes" [Live] – 3:13

== Personnel ==
- Tony Clarkin – Guitar
- Bob Catley – Vocals
- Wally Lowe – Bass
- Kex Gorin – Drums
- Richard Bailey – Keyboards, Flute (on 1 – 12)
- Mark Stanway – Keyboards (on 13 – 17)

== Charts ==
Chart (1980)	Peak position
UK Albums (OCC)	34
