= Rodney Matthews =

British artist

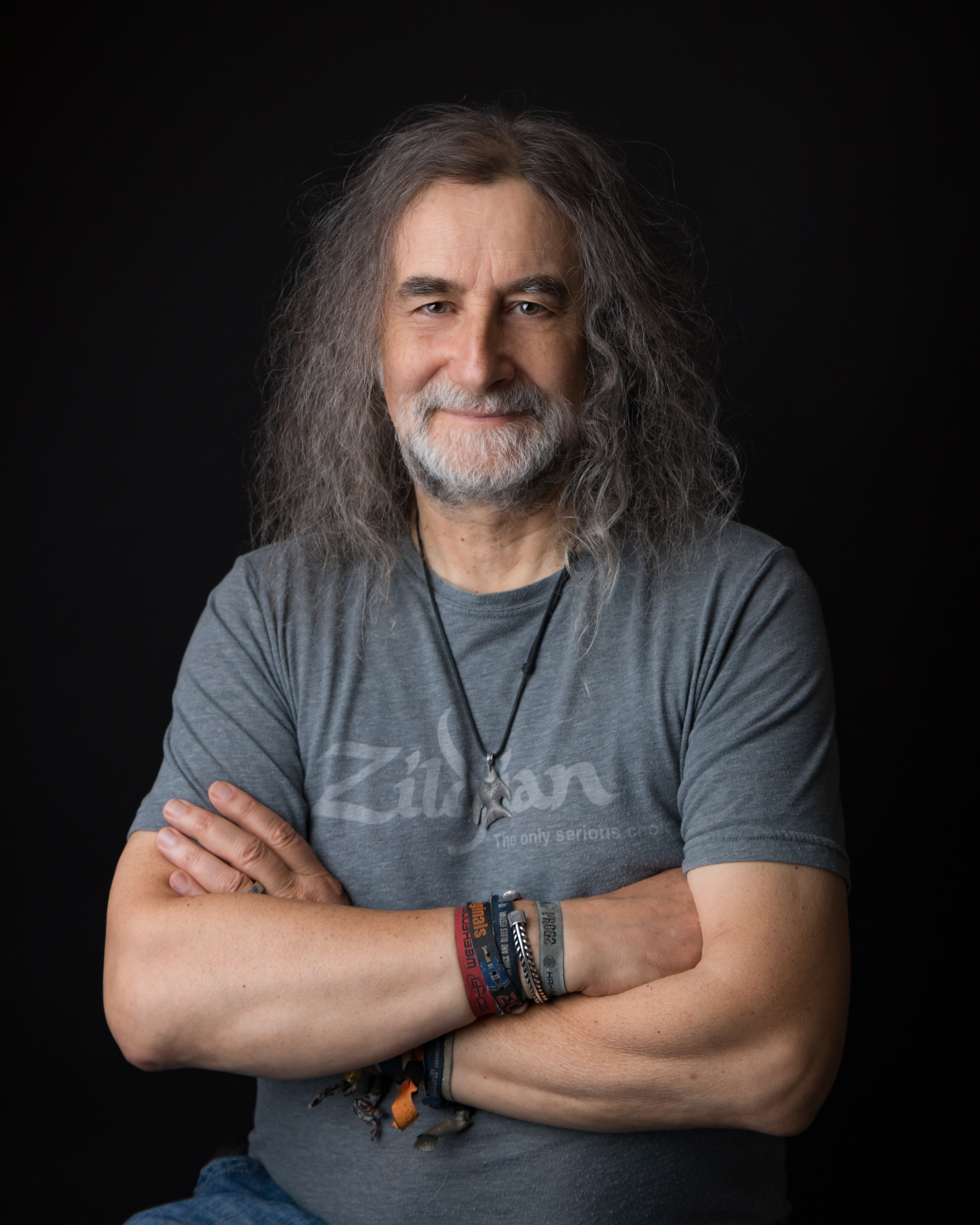
- Matthews in 2016
- Born: Rodney Clive Matthews; 6 July 1945 (age 81); Paulton, England
- Known for: Painting, drawing, conceptual design
- Movement: Fantasy art, science fiction, surrealism
- Website: rodneymatthewsstudios.com

Rodney Matthews (born 6 July 1945) is a British illustrator and conceptual designer of fantasy and science-fiction.

== Career ==
Trained at the West of England College of Art, Matthews worked in advertising for Plastic Dog Graphics before turning freelance in 1970, initially under the name Skyline Studios.

Matthews has painted over 140 subjects for record album covers, for many rock and progressive rock bands. More than 90 of his pictures have been published worldwide, selling in poster format, as well as many international editions of calendars, jigsaw puzzles, postcards, notecards, snowboards and T-shirts. His originals have been exhibited throughout the UK and Europe. He has been a regular exhibitor at the Chris Beetles Gallery, in London's West End, where he met English comedian, actor, writer and producer John Cleese, an avid collector of his work.

Matthews has illustrated numerous books, including those by English fantasy and science fiction author Michael Moorcock. Their collaboration in the 1970s resulted in a series of 12 large posters, depicting scenes from Moorcock's Eternal Champion series. These images were also used for a 1978 calendar entitled "Wizardry and Wild Romance".

In 1998, Matthews and the late Gerry Anderson completed Lavender Castle, a 26-episode stop-motion/C.G. television series for children. It was produced at Cosgrove Hall Films in Manchester and purchased by ITV for the UK. Matthews has also contributed concept designs for the 2005 film The Magic Roundabout.

He supplied conceptual designs for computer games such as the Sony/Psygnosis game Shadow Master and Haven: Call of the King, published by Midway. Matthews has produced some publicity and a logo for the green energy company Ecotricity.

He has also written lyrics and played drums on a music album influenced by his images; American guitarist Jeff Scheetz, John Payne (Asia) on bass guitar, Oliver Wakeman (Yes) on keyboards and Pete Coleman (composer and multi-instrumentalist).

== Album covers ==
Album covers (including EPs, LPs and DVDs):

- 1965, Pentworth's People, demo cover
- 1971, Thin Lizzy, New Day (EP)
- 1971, Fred Wedlock, The Folker
- 1971, Ian A. Anderson, A Vulture Is Not a Bird You Can Trust
- 1971, Pigsty Hill Light Orchestra, Piggery Jokery
- 1971, Various artists, The Great White Dap (EP)
- 1972, Amon Düül II, Live in London
- 1972, Dave Evans, Elephantasia
- 1972, Hillbilly Jazz, Vol. 1
- 1972, Hillbilly Jazz, Vol. 2
- 1972, Hunt & Turner, Magic Landscape
- 1972, Ian A. Anderson, Singer Sleeps on as Blaze Rages
- 1972, Various artists (feat. Little Richard, Sam Cooke and more), This Is How It All Began
- 1973, Al Jones, Jonesville
- 1973, Art Rosenbaum, Five String Banjo
- 1973, Bola Sete, Ocean
- 1973, Captain Lockheed and the Starfighters, Ejection (EP)
- 1973, Dave Carlsen (feat. Noel Redding, Keith Moon & Spencer Davis), Pale Horse
- 1973, David Stone & Allan Schiller, Delius
- 1973, Fred Wedlock, Frollicks
- 1973, Hamish Imlach, All Round Entertainer
- 1973, Stefan Grossman, Aunt Molly's Murray Farm
- 1973, Stefan Grossman, Contemporary Ragtime Guitar
- 1973, The Dartington String Quartet, Shostakovich
- 1974, Brinsley Schwarz, Golden Greats
- 1974, Geoffrey Woodruff, Live (6" LP)
- 1974, Old Pete, Old Pete (6" LP)
- 1974, Old Pete, Old Pete's Christmas Story (6" LP)
- 1974, Various artists, Some People Play Guitar Like a Lotta People Don't!
- 1975, Halfbreed, Halfbreed
- 1976, 20th Century Steel Band, Yellow Bird Is Dead
- 1977, Bo Hansson, Music Inspired by Lord of the Rings
- 1979, Nazareth, May The Sunshine (single); cut-out from the No Mean City artwork
- 1979, Nazareth, No Mean City
- 1980, Magnum, Chase the Dragon
- 1980, Praying Mantis, Praying Mantis (single)
- 1980, Praying Mantis, Time Tells No Lies
- 1981, Praying Mantis, Cheated (EP)
- 1981, Tygers of Pan Tang, Crazy Nights
- 1982, Bitches Sin, Predator
- 1982, Diamond Head, Borrowed Time
- 1982, Eloy, Planets
- 1982, Eloy, Time to Turn
- 1982, Scorpions, Lonesome Crow
- 1983, Magnum, The Eleventh Hour
- 1984, Eloy, Metromania
- 1984, Tigermoth, Tigermoth
- 1985, Magnum, On a Storyteller's Night
- 1986, Motherlode, The Sanctuary
- 1987, Diamond Head, Am I Evil
- 1987, Magnum, Mirador
- 1988, Magnum, Kingdom of Madness
- 1988, Magnum, Magnum II
- 1988, Tigermoth, Howling Moth
- 1989, Full Moon, Full Moon
- 1989, Magnum, Foundation
- 1990, Detritus, Perpetual Defiance
- 1990, Seventh Angel, The Torment
- 1991, Praying Mantis, Predator in Disguise
- 1991, Rick Wakeman, 2000 A.D. Into the Future
- 1991, Seventh Angel, Lament for the Weary
- 1991, White Metal Warriors, Last Ship Home
- 1992, Asia, Aqua
- 1992, Asia, Who Will Stop the Rain? (single)
- 1992, Magnum, Only in America (single)
- 1992, Magnum, Sleepwalking
- 1992, Rudi Dobson & Rodney Matthews, The House on the Rock
- 1992, Veni Domine, Fall Babylon Fall
- 1993, Barclay James Harvest, Caught in the Light
- 1993, Gethsemane Rose, Tattered 'N' Torn
- 1993, Magnum, Archive
- 1993, Magnum, Keeping the Nite Light Burning
- 1993, Stairway, No Rest: No Mercy
- 1994, Rodd & Marco, Jurassic Church
- 1994, Veni Domine, Material Sanctuary
- 1995, Asia, Arena
- 1995, Rick Wakeman, The New Gospels
- 1995, Tradia, Welcome to Paradise
- 1996, Asia, Archiva Vol. 1
- 1996, Asia, Archiva Vol. 2
- 1996, Crucifer, Hellbound Angel
- 1997, Magnum, Stronghold
- 1999, Oliver Wakeman & Clive Nolan, Jabberwocky
- 2000, Doug King, The Snugldorfs
- 2003, Asia, Different Worlds Live
- 2003, Asia, Live in Moscow (DVD)
- 2003, Barclay James Harvest, 25th Anniversary Concert (DVD)
- 2003, Hawkwind, Welcome to the Future (2CD/DVD Box)
- 2003, Magnum, A Winter's Tale (DVD)
- 2003, Squidd, Twice Upon a Time (3 Track CD)
- 2003, Steve Hackett, Horizons (DVD)
- 2003, Uriah Heep, Live in the USA (DVD)
- 2003, Various artists (feat. Fairport Convention, Lindisfarne, The Strawbs and more), Folk Rock Anthology (DVD)
- 2003, Various artists (feat. Black Sabbath, Deep Purple, Saxon and more), Hard Rock Anthology (DVD)
- 2003, Various artists (feat. Keith Emerson, Jon Lord, Rick Wakeman and more), Keyboard Wizards (DVD)
- 2003, Various artists (feat. Lynard Skynyrd, Free, Asia, Magnum and more), Rock Anthems (DVD)
- 2003, Various artists (feat. Mick Box, Steve Howe, Jan Akkerman, Toni Iommi and more), The Guitar Wizards: Presented By Mick Box (DVD)
- 2003, Various artists (feat. Uriah Heep, Asia, Nektar and more), The International Classic Rock Festival (DVD)
- 2003, Various artists (feat. Emerson, Lake & Palmer, Focus, Rick Wakeman and more), The Progressive Rock Anthology (DVD)
- 2003, Various artists (feat. Caravan, Curved Air, Family and more), The Underground Anthology (DVD)
- 2004, John Lawton Band, Shakin' the Tale (CD/DVD)
- 2004, Uriah Heep, Magic Night (CD/DVD)
- 2005, Russell Allen & Jørn Lande, The Battle
- 2006, Nazareth, The Very Best of Nazareth
- 2007, Magnum, Princess Alice and the Broken Arrow
- 2007, Russell Allen & Jørn Lande, The Revenge
- 2007, Stormzone, Caught in the Act
- 2008, Bob Catley, Immortal
- 2008, Hawkwind, Out of the Shadows (CD/DVD)
- 2008, Jeff Scheetz, Behind the Mask
- 2008, Magnum, Wings of Heaven Live
- 2008, V-Rats, Intelligent Design
- 2009, Magnum, Into the Valley of the Moon King
- 2009, Roxxcalibur, NWOBHM For Muthas
- 2010, Magnum, The Gathering
- 2010, Russell Allen & Jørn Lande, The Showdown
- 2010, Stairway, Interregnum
- 2011, Atkins May Project, Serpent's Kiss
- 2011, Magnum, The Visitation
- 2011, Roxxcalibur, Lords of the NWOBHM
- 2012, Atkins May Project, Valley of Shadows
- 2012, Frog Riders, Utterly Spontaneous
- 2012, Geoff Whitely Project, Confidential Whispers
- 2012, Magnum, On the 13th Day
- 2012, Tygers of Pan Tang, Ambush
- 2013, Avantasia, The Mystery of Time
- 2013, Geoff Whitely Project, Yetoto
- 2014, Atkins May Project, Empire of Destruction
- 2014, Jeff Scheetz, Rodney Matthews & Friends (John Payne, Oliver Wakeman, Bob Catley & Pete Coleman), I Saw Three Ships (Single)
- 2014, Magnum, Escape from the Shadow Garden
- 2014, Rick Wakeman, Fields of Green
- 2015, Nazareth, No Means of Escape
- 2015, Praying Mantis, Legacy
- 2015, Starquake, Times That Matter
- 2016, Magnum, Sacred Blood "Divine" Lies
- 2016, Seeing Red, Keep the Fire Burning
- 2016, The Rolling Stones, Another Time, Another Place
- 2017, The Rolling Stones, Time on Our Side
- 2017, The Rolling Stones, Painted Black
- 2018, Magnum, Lost on the Road to Eternity
- 2018, The Dukes of the Orient, The Dukes of the Orient
- 2018, Praying Mantis, Gravity
- 2020, Ellesmere, Wyrd
- 2021, Blind Golem, A Dream of Fantasy
- 2023, Magnum, Here Comes the Rain
- 2024, Ellesmere, Stranger Skies
- 2025, Avantasia, Here Be Dragons

== Books ==
Anthologies:

- 1985, Rodney Matthews & Nigel Suckling, In Search of Forever, Dragon's World (n.b. there is also a Japanese edition; there was also a UK book club edition, published by Guild).
- 1989, Rodney Matthews & Nigel Suckling, Last Ship Home, Dragon's World.
- 1990, Rodney Matthews & Nigel Suckling, Voyages Extrêmes, Vents d'Ouest (n.b. this is the French edition of Last Ship Home).
- 1997, Rodney Matthews & Nigel Suckling, Countdown to Millennium, Collins & Brown.

Portfolios:

- 1990, Rodney Matthews & Nigel Suckling, The Rodney Matthews Portfolio, Dragon's World.
- 1993, Rodney Matthews & Pauline Fisk, The 2nd Rodney Matthews Portfolio, Dragon's World.
- 1994, Rodney Matthews & Nigel Suckling, Rodney Matthews (Paper Tiger Miniatures), Paper Tiger.

Illustrated books:

- 1974, The Blue Planet Series: Book 1: Blast Off!, Childs Play (International) Ltd.
- 1974, The Blue Planet Series: Book 2: The Journey, Childs Play (International) Ltd.
- 1974, The Blue Planet Series: Book 3: On the Planet, Childs Play (International) Ltd.
- 1974, The Blue Planet Series: Book 4: Back to Earth, Childs Play (International) Ltd.
- 1978, Rodney Matthews & Graham Smith, Yendor: The Journey of a Junior Adventurer, Big O Publishing.
- 1980, Michael Moorcock, Stormbringer, United States: Archival Press.
- 1986, Cheryl Evans & Anne Millard, Usborne Illustrated Guide to Norse Myths and Legends, Usborne.
- 1987, Cheryl Evans & Anne Millard, Usborne Illustrated Guide to Greek Myths and Legends, Usborne.
- 1987, Cheryl Evans & Anne Millard, The Usborne Book of Greek and Norse Legends, Usborne.
- 1987, Michael Moorcock: A Collaboration with Rodney Matthews, Elric at the End of Time, Dragon's World.
- 1994, Felicity Brooks, Tales of King Arthur, Usborne.
- 1998, Felicity Brooks, Tales of King Arthur & His Knights, Usborne.
- 1999, Doug King & Rodney Matthews, The Snugldorfs – Smile God Loves You! United States: Cepher.
- 2008, Lewis Carroll, Alice in Wonderland, Templar (foreword by John Cleese).
- 2010, Rodney Matthews & Marco Palmer, The Fantastic Intergalactic Adventures of Stanley & Livingston, Rodney Matthews Studios.

Paperback covers:

Stephen R. Lawhead:

- 1990, The Paradise War, Lion Books.
- 1991, The Silver Hand, Lion Books.
- 1992, The Endless Knot, Lion Books.

A. Merritt:

- 1977, The Face in the Abyss, New York: Avon Books.
- 1977, The Moon Pool, New York: Avon Books.

Michael Moorcock:

- 1976, Legends From the End of Time, W. H. Allen (image: Mongrove).
- 1976, The End of All Songs, Granada/Mayflower (image: Lord Jagged of Canaria).
- 1976, The Transformation of Miss Mavis Ming, W. H. Allen (image: The Return of the Fireclown).
- 1979, The Bull & The Spear, Granada (image: The Hound Master of Kerenos).
- 1979, The Knight of the Swords, Granada (image: In the Flamelands).

Andre Norton:

- 1977, Spell of the Witch World, Wyndham/Universal.
- 1977, Three Against the Witch World, Wyndham/Universal.
- 1977, Web of the Witch World, Wyndham/Universal.
- 1977, Witch World, Wyndham/Universal.
- 1978, Sorceress of the Witch World, Wyndham/Universal.
- 1978, The Year of the Unicorn, Wyndham/Universal.
- 1978, Trey of Swords, Wyndham/Universal.
- 1978, Warlock of the Witch World, Wyndham/Universal.

Clark Ashton Smith:

- 1976, Other Dimensions: Volume 1, Panther/Granada (image: Venus Cruiser).
- 1976, Other Dimensions: Volume 2, Panther/Granada (image: The Ghoul).

Others:

- 1977, Michael Moorcock (Editor), England Invaded: A Collection of Fantasy Fiction, W. H. Allen (image: The Monster of Lake La Metrie).
- 1978, John Crowley, Beasts, Orbit/Futura (image: The Old Shot Tower).
- 1978, Patricia A. McKillip, The Forgotten Beasts of Eld, New York: Avon Books.
- 1978, Josef Nesvabda, In the Footsteps of the Abominable Snowman, New English Library.
- 1979, Robert Lynn Asprin, The Bug Wars, New English Library.
- 1985, Andrew Chapman, Steve Jackson and Ian Livingstone Present: Seas of Blood (Fighting Fantasy), Puffin Books.
- 1986, Joseph O'Neill, Land Under England, Penguin Books (image: Beneath the Wall).
- 1987, Worlds Without Words (Educational Resources), 4mation.
- 1988, Jack Vance, Green Magic: The Fantasy Realms of Jack Vance, Tor (image: The Last Armada).
- 1988, Jack Vance, Grüne Magie, Heyne (image: Tiger Moth).
- 1992, Colin Duriez, The Tolkien and Middle-Earth Handbook, Monarch.
- 1992, Naomi Starkey, Ends of the Earth, Minstrel/Kingsway.
- 2009, Mark Jones, Bristol Folk, BFP (Matthews contributed a written piece and the book includes many of his images)
- 2010, George Russell, Where the Bugs Wear Boots, George Russell Associates.

(Rodney Matthews' images have also been used on many international editions, particularly for Moorcock's German publishers.)

Magazine covers:

Vortex: The Science Fiction Fantasy:

- Vol. 1 No. 1, January 1977: Vortex, 1976.
- Vol. 1 No. 2, February 1977: Space Hijak, 1976.
- Vol. 1 No. 3, March 1977: Out of an Amber Sky, 1976.
- Commissioned, but unused: Metropolis Trap, 1977.
- Commissioned, but unused: The Crab, 1977.

Imagine (published by T.S.R. Hobbies (UK) Ltd):

- No. 1, April 1983: Elric and Moonglum, 1976.
- No. 9, December 1983: Imagine, 1982.
- No. 12, March 1984: The Guardian Awakes, 1982.
- No. 22, January 1985: Earl Aubec of Malador, 1984.
- Issue and date unknown: Araneida the Destroyer, 1983.
- Sales leaflet cover: Who Disturbs the Tyrant?, 1983.

FAB – The Gerry Anderson Fan Magazine:

- No. 32, 1998.
- No. 36, 1998.

Others:

- Software Communications Magazine, The Fury, 1988.
- Skivor & Band, The Rainbow Room, 1993.
- Classic Rock Trade Magazine, The Hop, 2003.

== Bands and recordings ==
Bands:

- The Cheetahs
- The Rhythm Cats
- Pentworth's People
- Barnaby Goode
- Originn
- Squidd

Recordings:

- Pentworth's People: Demo on vinyl (2 tracks)
- Squidd: Twice Upon a Time (3-track CD)
- Frog Riders: Utterly Spontaneous – Jam Session (7-track CD)
- Rudi Dobson & Rodney Matthews, featuring Tony Clarkin: The House on the Rock (3-track CD)
- Jeff Scheetz, Rodney Matthews & Friends (John Payne, Oliver Wakeman, Bob Catley and Pete Coleman): I Saw Three Ships (1-track CD)
- Rodney Matthews and Oliver Wakeman: In the Bleak Midwinter (3-track CD)
- Rodney Matthews and Jeff Scheetz with Oliver Wakeman: Trinity (10-track CD and 13-track double vinyl)
