= Magnum II =

Studio album by Magnum
- Released: October 1979
- Recorded: 1978–1979
- Studios: Music Centre Studios, London
- Genre: Hard rock
- Length: 40:33
- Label: Jet
- Producer: Leo Lyons

Magnum chronology
Kingdom of Madness (1978)	Magnum II (1979)	Marauder (1980)

Singles from Magnum II
- 1. "Changes" Released: 21 September 1979; 2. "Foolish Heart" Released: 2 November 1979

Professional ratings
Review scores
Source	Rating
AllMusic	3/5 stars
Kerrang!	3.5/5 stars
Record Mirror	2.5/5 stars

Magnum II is the second studio album by the English rock band Magnum. It was released in 1979 on Jet Records. Magnum II followed on from the success of Magnum's debut album, Kingdom of Madness. The album was produced by former Ten Years After bass player Leo Lyons, who had success with producing Phenomenon, Force It and No Heavy Petting for UFO.

As with their debut album Kingdom of Madness, much of the material on Magnum II was already written and had already been previewed in Magnum's live set and were suitably "road tested". The album, however failed to chart on its release in October 1979. Both "Changes", released in September 1979, and "Foolish Heart", released in November 1979, were singles.

The 2005 expanded version of the album was reissued on 22 September 2006 in Japan with mini LP/paper sleeve packaging through Arcangelo. The album was also included in a limited edition Japanese box set, comprising all six of Sanctuary Records expanded and remastered releases with mini LP/paper sleeve packaging. The set included an outer box featuring Magnum's Chase the Dragon artwork.

== Track listing ==
All tracks are written by Tony Clarkin.

Original 1979 release
No.	Title	Length
1.	"Great Adventure"	4:54
2.	"Changes"	3:15
3.	"The Battle"	2:10
4.	"If I Could Live Forever"	4:02
5.	"Reborn"	5:45
6.	"So Cold the Night"	4:04
7.	"Foolish Heart"	3:13
8.	"Stayin' Alive"	3:22
9.	"Firebird"	4:47
10.	"All of My Life"	4:43

2005 expanded edition
No.	Title	Length
11.	"Lonesome Star" (B-side)	3:13
12.	"Changes" (remix)	4:11
13.	"Everybody Needs" (B-side)	2:52
14.	"Changes" (live)	3:44
15.	"Foolish Heart" (1993 acoustic recording)	2:54

== Reissues ==
Release date	Formats	Label	Catalogue number	Notes
10/1979	LP	Jet Records	JETLP222	Silver sleeve
03/1987	LP, CD	Castle Communications	CLALP125, CLACD125	
01/1988	CD	Jet Records	JETCD002	
01/1989	LP, PD, CD	FM Records	WKFMLP119, WKFMPD119, WKFMXD119	Rodney Matthews artwork
08/1999	CD	Castle Essentials	ESMCD748	Includes bonus tracks
10/2005	CD	Sanctuary Records	CMQDD1229	Remastered and expanded
2020/2021	LP	Renaissance Records US	RDEGLP885	

== Bonus tracks ==
In 2005, Sanctuary Records released a remastered and expanded edition with bonus tracks.

"Lonesome Star" (disc 1, track 11)
Recorded during the Magnum II sessions, originally released as the B-side to the "Changes" single.

"Changes" (disc 1, track 12)
A remixed version of the album track. Released as a single after the success of Marauder.

"Everybody Needs" (disc 1, track 13)
B-side to the "Changes" remixed single, a re-recording of a demo recorded during Kingdom of Madness sessions.

"Changes" (disc 1, track 14)
B-side to the "Changes" remixed single, recorded live at The Marquee, London. Originally released on Marauder.

"Foolish Heart" (disc 1, track 15)
Released in 1993 on Magnum's acoustic album Keeping the Nite Light Burning.

== Singles ==
Changes 7" (September 1979)

1. "Changes" [LP version] – 3:15
2. "Lonesome Star" [B-side] – 3:13

Foolish Heart 7" (November 1979)

1. "Foolish Heart" [LP version] – 3:13
2. "Baby Rock Me" [LP version] – 4:05

== Personnel ==
- Bob Catley – vocals
- Tony Clarkin – guitar
- Wally Lowe – bass
- Richard Bailey – keyboards, flute
- Kex Gorin – drums

Production

- Produced by Leo Lyons
- Engineered by Rafe McKenna
- Assisted by Paul Hume
- Mastered at Abbey Road Studios by Nic Webb
- Recorded at Music Centre Studios, Wembley
