= The Eleventh Hour =

The Eleventh Hour may refer to:

- "The eleventh hour", a phrase in the Parable of the Workers in the Vineyard in the Bible

== Film ==
- The Eleventh Hour (1912 film), an Australian silent film
- The Eleventh Hour (1922 film), a British adaptation of one of Ethel M. Dell's romance novels
- The Eleventh Hour (1923 film), an American film directed by Bernard J. Durning
- Eleventh Hour (1942 animated film), a Superman cartoon
- Eleventh Hour (1942 documentary film), an Australian short documentary film
- The 11th Hour (2007 film), an American documentary narrated by Leonardo DiCaprio, on the state of the natural environment
- The 11th Hour (2014 film), a German/Danish drama/thriller film

== Television ==
- The 11th Hour, a 1999 Canadian sketch comedy show on CBC starring Nancy Robertson and Ian Boothby
- The 11th Hour, a 2016 American newscast on MSNBC initially anchored by Brian Williams
- The Eleventh Hour (1962 TV series), a 1962–1964 American medical drama that aired on NBC
- The Eleventh Hour (Canadian TV series), a 2002–2005 Canadian drama series that aired on CTV
- Eleventh Hour (British TV series), a British television series broadcast for one series of four episodes in 2006
- Eleventh Hour (American TV series), an American television series broadcast for one season of 18 episodes 2008–2009
- 11th Hour (web series), 2021 Indian crime-thriller web series
- "The Eleventh Hour" (Doctor Who), an episode of the British television series Doctor Who debuting the Eleventh Doctor
- "The Eleventh Hour," an episode of the American television series Make It or Break It
- The Eleventh Hour, an Australian sketch comedy that aired on HSV-7 in 1985
- "Eleventh Hour", an episode of the fourth season of Wentworth
- "11th Hour", an episode of 60 Days In

== Literature ==
- The Eleventh Hour (book), a children's picture-book by Graeme Base (1989)
- 11th Hour (novel), a novel by James Patterson and Maxine Paetro, part of the Women's Murder Club series (2012)
- Eleventh Hour, a book by Hussain Zaidi (2018)
- The Eleventh Hour (story collection), five stories by Salman Rushdie (2025)

== Music ==
- The Eleventh Hour (Jars of Clay album), 2002, containing a song of that same title
- The Eleventh Hour (Magnum album), 1983
- The Eleventh Hour (Evan Parker album), 2004
- The Eleventh Hour (The Birthday Suit album), 2011
- Eleventh Hour (Del the Funky Homosapien album), 2008
- Eleventh Hour (Fred Frith album), 2005
- "The Eleventh Hour", a song by August Burns Red on the album Messengers
- "The Eleventh Hour", a song by Fates Warning on the album Parallels
- "Eleventh Hour", a song by Yngwie Malmsteen on the album Perpetual Flame
- "The 11th Hour", a song by Rancid on the album ...And Out Come the Wolves
- "The 11th Hour", a song by The Tea Party on the album The Ocean at the End
- "The 11th Hour", a music project by Ed Warby
- "11th Hour", a song by Lamb of God on the album As the Palaces Burn
- "11th Hour", a song by Mushroomhead on the album A Wonderful Life
- "11th Hour", a song by Pinegrove on the album 11:11 (2022)
- "Eleventh Hour", the music for The Refuge in the Solstice Route of OneShot

== Other uses ==
- The 11th Hour (newspaper), an alternative weekly published in the U.S. state of Georgia
- The 11th Hour (video game), a 1995 interactive puzzle game with a horror setting
- The Eleventh Hour (1933 play), a play by Anthony Armstrong
- Vestas 11th Hour Racing, a sailing team and a yacht
- The Eleventh Hour, the fifth chapter of the Balance Arc for the comedy podcast The Adventure Zone

== See also ==
- Armistice Day, which occurred on "the eleventh hour of the eleventh day of the eleventh month" of 1918, when World War I hostilities ended
