= Goodnight L.A. =

Studio album by Magnum
- Released: July 1990
- Recorded: 1989–1990
- Studio: Goodnight L.A. Studios, Los Angeles
- Genre: Hard rock
- Length: 48:40
- Label: Polydor
- Producer: Keith Olsen

Magnum chronology
| Foundation (1989) | Goodnight L.A. (1990) | The Spirit (1991) |

Singles from Goodnight L.A.
- 1. "Rockin' Chair" Released: June 1990; 2. "Heartbroke and Busted" Released: August 1990

Professional ratings
Review scores
| Source | Rating |
|---|---|
| AllMusic | 2/5 stars |
| Select | 2/5 |

Goodnight L.A. is the eighth studio album by the English rock band Magnum, released in 1990 by Polydor.

Most of the material was already written and arranged, at least in demo form, and was taken to Los Angeles and Vancouver to find an American producer. Keith Olsen was suggested because of the success of his work on Whitesnake's 1987. Tony Clarkin, the band's guitarist and usually the sole songwriter, then invited co-writers such as Russ Ballard, Jim Vallance and David Cassidy's wife Sue Shifrin to collaborate on songwriting. Other songs called "The Rock" and "On That Day" were retitled or dropped. "Come Back Running" was recorded as a demo version, but it was never released. An additional title, written by Ballard and Clarkin, was published around this time called "Dancing With The Devil"; if this song was recorded, it has yet to be released.

The rest of the band flew to Los Angeles in 1990 to record "Goodnight L.A." at Olsen's studios. The album was originally titled Born to Be King but was eventually named after the studio.

Three singles were planned. "Rockin' Chair" was released first, followed by "Heartbroke and Busted"; the third single, "No Way Out", was cancelled because Polydor was disappointed with the chart ranking of "Heartbroke and Busted".

While Polydor's plan for a Magnum breakthrough in America failed (the album was not released there), Goodnight L.A. was a commercial success at home, charting 9 in the United Kingdom (a position surpassed only by Wings of Heaven).

== Track listing ==
All tracks are written by Tony Clarkin, except where noted.

Original 1990 release
| No. | Title | Writer(s) | Length |
|---|---|---|---|
| 1. | "Rockin' Chair" | Tony Clarkin, Russ Ballard | 4:10 |
| 2. | "Mama" | | 4:34 |
| 3. | "Only a Memory" | | 7:04 |
| 4. | "Reckless Man" | | 3:11 |
| 5. | "Matter of Survival" | Tony Clarkin, Russ Ballard | 4:19 |
| 6. | "What Kind of Love Is This?" | Tony Clarkin, Jim Vallance | 4:35 |
| 7. | "Heartbroke and Busted" | | 3:37 |
| 8. | "Shoot" | | 3:34 |
| 9. | "No Way Out" | Tony Clarkin, Russ Ballard | 3:59 |
| 10. | "Cry for You" | Tony Clarkin, Sue Shiffron | 3:57 |
| 11. | "Born to Be King" | | 5:33 |

== Singles ==
Rockin' Chair 7" (1990)

1. "Rockin' Chair" [LP version] (Tony Clarkin and Russ Ballard) — 4:10
2. "Mama" [LP version] — 4:34

Rockin' Chair 12" (1990)

1. "Rockin' Chair" [LP version] (Tony Clarkin and Russ Ballard) — 4:10
2. "Mama" [LP version] — 4:34
3. "Where Do You Run To" [B-side] — 3:44

Rockin' Chair CD (1990)

1. "Rockin' Chair" [LP version] (Tony Clarkin and Russ Ballard) — 4:10
2. "Mama" [LP version] — 4:34
3. "Where Do You Run To" [B-side] — 3:44

Heartbroke and Busted 7" (1990)

1. "Heartbroke and Busted" [LP version] — 3:37
2. "Hanging Tree" [B-side] — 0:00

Heartbroke and Busted 12" (1990)

1. "Heartbroke and Busted" [LP version] — 3:37
2. "Hanging Tree" [B-side] — 0:00
3. "Cry for You" [LP version] (Tony Clarkin and Sue Shiffron) — 0:00

Heartbroke and Busted EP (1990)

1. "Heartbroke and Busted" [LP version] — 3:37
2. "Les Mort Dansant" [acoustic] — 3:37
3. "Hanging Tree" [B-side] — 0:00
4. "Cry for You" [LP version] (Tony Clarkin and Sue Shiffron) — 0:00

Heartbroke and Busted CD (1990)

1. "Heartbroke and Busted" [LP version] — 3:30
2. "Hanging Tree" [B-side] — 3:37
3. "Cry for You" [LP version] (Tony Clarkin and Sue Shiffron) — 3:52

== Personnel ==
- Bob Catley — vocals
- Tony Clarkin — guitar
- Wally Lowe — bass guitar
- Mark Stanway — keyboards
- Mickey Barker — drums

Additional musicians

- Tommy Funderburk — backing vocals
- Michael Sadler — backing vocals
- Paulinho da Costa — percussion
- Deric Dyer — saxophone

== Charts ==
| Chart (1990) | Peak position |
|---|---|
| Finnish Albums (The Official Finnish Charts) | 30 |
| German Albums (Offizielle Top 100) | 21 |
| Norwegian Albums (VG-lista) | 15 |
| Swedish Albums (Sverigetopplistan) | 7 |
| Swiss Albums (Schweizer Hitparade) | 12 |
| UK Albums (OCC) | 9 |
