= On a Storyteller's Night =

Studio album by Magnum
- Released: 13 May 1985
- Recorded: 1985
- Studio: Abattoir Studios, Birmingham, England
- Genre: Hard rock
- Length: 45:45
- Label: FM; Polydor
- Producer: Kit Woolven

Magnum chronology
The Eleventh Hour (1983)	On a Storyteller's Night (1985)	Vigilante (1986)

Singles from On a Storyteller's Night
- 1. "Just Like an Arrow" Released: March 1985; 2. "On a Storyteller's Night" Released: May 1985

On a Storyteller's Night is the fifth studio album by the English rock band Magnum, released on 13 May 1985 on FM Records in the UK and on Polydor Records in Germany. It is considered Magnum's breakthrough album and remains their best-selling album to date.

== Background and recording ==
Magnum had parted company with Jet Records in 1983, and Mark Stanway had departed to work with Phil Lynott's Grand Slam, and Kex Gorin had joined Robin George's band. In 1984, Keith Baker took over management, and the band recruited Jim Simpson as a drummer and Eddie George as keyboard player. Following a six-week tour of the UK, Tony Clarkin began writing new material. Mark Stanway later returned to the band, and the band recruited Kit Woolven, who has produced albums for Phil Lynott, David Gilmour and Thin Lizzy. The album was recorded at DEP International Studios, then known as The Abattoir Studios, the home of UB40.

== Content ==
=== Cover art ===
The cover art was designed by Rodney Matthews.

"On a Storyteller's Night is also a favourite of mine and one of my best known images. Again it was largely designed by Tony Clarkin with his formidable biro!" — Rodney Matthews

"One of Matthews' best-loved pictures [is] 'On a Storyteller's Night', which was used by Magnum as a sleeve. As surprising as the degree of lively detail is that it took only ten days to complete (with the help of some Midnight oil). The suggestion came from Tony Clarkin, Magnum's leader, writer and lyricist. The taverns interior is faintly reminiscent of The George in Norton St. Philip near Rodney's former home on Somerset. Background details include two previous Matthews' covers for the band [Chase The Dragon and The Eleventh Hour], while Matthews' own dog, Patch is under the table." — Nigel Suckling

=== Les Morts Dansants ===
The album features one of Tony Clarkin's most thoughtful songs, "Les Morts Dansants" — a simple song that paints a picture of a man suffering from shell shock being executed by a firing squad, as his condition is misunderstood as cowardice (the fate of hundreds of British soldiers during World War I); the song accomplishes this with some colorful and imaginative metaphors. The song was covered in 1987 by the American singer Patty Smyth of the band Scandal on her first solo album Never Enough, but because of its French title the song was retitled "Call To Heaven".

== Release ==
Professional ratings
Review scores
Source	Rating
AllMusic	3.5/5 stars
Classic Rock	4/5 stars

The album achieved a silver award two months after the release, and a gold award four years later.

Upon its release in May 1985, On a Storyteller's Night reached No. 24 in the UK charts and launched the band across Europe and is also notable for the stunning cover by fantasy illustrator Rodney Matthews. Two singles were released to promote the album, an alternative recording of "Just Like an Arrow" in March 1985 and "On a Storyteller's Night" in May 1985. In 2005, Sanctuary Records remastered and expanded the album for its 20th anniversary, including a bonus disc of the album's demo material. The band also toured, performing all of the tracks in their entirety for the first time. The 2005 expanded version of the album was reissued on 22 September 2006 in Japan, with mini LP/paper sleeve packaging, through Arcangelo. The album was also included in a limited edition Japanese box set, comprising all six of Sanctuary Records expanded and remastered releases with mini LP/paper sleeve packaging. The set included an outer box with Magnum's Chase The Dragon artwork.

=== Singles ===
Just Like an Arrow 7" (March 1985)

1. "Just Like an Arrow" [alternative take] — 3:22
2. "Two Hearts" [alternative take] — 4:24

The promotional video for "Just Like An Arrow" showed a black jeep, starting in a bullfighting ring and ending up reaching the band who were laying at the base of a cliff. In parallel, a caped and hooded rider in Arabic clothing remniscient of Scheherazade on a horse rode on an apparent quest to reach to band, ultimately revealed to be a beautiful young woman. The true meaning of these parallel aspects of the video are utterly lost and the video has to qualify as one of the most baffling or pointless. The single and video also feature an "alternative take" on the track, with the guitar solo partially covered by added vocals.

Just Like an Arrow 12" (March 1985)

1. "Just Like an Arrow" [alternative take] — 3:22
2. "Two Hearts" [alternative take] — 4:24
3. "The Word" [B-Side] — 4:58

On a Storyteller's Night 7" (May 1985)

1. "On a Storyteller's Night" — 4:59
2. "Before First Light" — 3:52

On a Storyteller's Night 12" (May 1985)

1. "On a Storyteller's Night" — 4:59
2. "Before First Light" — 3:52

=== Reissues ===
Release date	Formats	Label	Catalogue number	Notes
05/1985	LP, PD, CD	FM Records	WKFMLP34, WKFMPD34, WKMXD34	
12/1988	LP	FM Records	WKFMHP34	
01/1990	LP	FM Records	WKFMGP34	
01/1993	CD	Jet Records	JETCD1007	Includes interview
02/2000	CD	Receiver Records	RRCD283	Includes interview
10/2005	2CD	Sanctuary Records	CMQDD1115	Remastered and expanded with bonus disc of rarities

"These demos were recorded at a studio called Switch Music which has long ceased to exist. I think the original recording date was in the Autumn of 1984, we went into the studio to produce some rough ideas for the songs consequently this is why some of the tracks just have a drum machine on them. At the time we began recording the album we didn't have a record deal but this changed when we were halfway through the demos when we did get signed and continued to record the rest of the demos as a Live Band."

"Some of the songs started life with different titles. 'Les Morts Dansants' had a working title of 'Cannon' and 'Steal Your Heart' was originally titled 'Come on Young Love'. 'The Last Dance' changed dramatically from the original recordings which is very obvious when you compare the demo version to the finished song and the demo to 'All England's Eyes' has a hideous solo on a melodica as I didn't have my guitar at the studio that day and there was a melodica lying around the studio, enough said!!"

"The extra tracks are demos recorded in their most basic form and were the first stage the songs went through. We then played them live on stage before we ever recorded them properly which meant they changed from show to show and were suitable "road tested" before recording. The title track 'On A Storyteller's Night' was written on the road on a tour bus a month before we went into the studio to record the album."

"Finally in 1985 we went into Abattoir Studios in Birmingham to record On a Storyteller's Night." — Tony Clarkin, February 2005

== Track listing ==
All tracks are written by Tony Clarkin.

Disc 1 (original 1985 release)
No.	Title	Length
1.	"How Far Jerusalem"	6:25
2.	"Just Like an Arrow"	3:22
3.	"On a Storyteller's Night"	4:59
4.	"Before First Light"	3:52
5.	"Les Morts Dansants"	5:47
6.	"Endless Love"	4:30
7.	"Two Hearts"	4:25
8.	"Steal Your Heart"	3:59
9.	"All England's Eyes"	4:47
10.	"The Last Dance"	3:39

Disc 2 (2005 expanded edition)
No.	Title	Length
1.	"How Far Jerusalem" (Demo)	5:45
2.	"Endless Love" (Demo)	3:49
3.	"Before First Light" (Demo)	4:26
4.	"All England's Eyes" (Demo)	4:50
5.	"Come on Young Love #1" (Demo)	3:47
6.	"Come on Young Love #2" (Demo)	3:30
7.	"Cannon (a.k.a. Les Morts Dansants)" (Demo)	5:07
8.	"The Last Dance" (Demo)	4:09
9.	"Interview with Tony Clarkin and Bob Catley"	24:46

== Personnel ==
Magnum

- Bob Catley – vocals
- Tony Clarkin – guitar
- Wally Lowe – bass guitar
- Mark Stanway – keyboards
- Jim Simpson – drums

Additional musicians

- Mo Birch – backing vocals on "Les Morts Dansants"
- Kex Gorin – drums on disc 2, tracks 1, 3–5, 8

Production

- Produced and engineered by Kit Woolven
- Recorded at the Abattoir Studios, Birmingham, England
- Mastered at Abbey Road Studios on Direct Metal Mastering

== Charts ==
Chart (1985)	Peak position
Swedish Albums (Sverigetopplistan)	44
UK Albums (OCC)	24

== Certifications ==
Region	Certification	Certified units/sales
United Kingdom (BPI)	Gold	100,000^{^}
^{^} Shipments figures based on certification alone.
