= The Eleventh Hour (Magnum album) =

The Eleventh Hour!

Studio album by Magnum
- Released: May 1983
- Recorded: 1983
- Studio: Portland Studios, London
- Genre: Hard rock
- Length: 39:38
- Label: Jet
- Producer: Tony Clarkin

Magnum chronology
Chase the Dragon (1982)	The Eleventh Hour! (1983)	On a Storyteller's Night (1985)

Professional ratings
Review scores
Source	Rating
AllMusic	3/5 stars
Kerrang!	(mixed)

The Eleventh Hour is the fourth studio album by English rock band Magnum, released in 1983 by Jet Records. The production of this album caused a lot of tension between the band and Jet Records, following the two-year delay to the previous album, Chase the Dragon in 1982 and their first album, Kingdom of Madness, in 1978. These tensions were further strained when Jet Records denied the band a big name producer, leaving them to produce the album themselves.

The Eleventh Hour! was released in May 1983, peaking at No. 38 in the UK charts, disappointing considering Chase the Dragons peak of No. 17 in 1982. The Eleventh Hour!'s original title was to be Road to Paradise. The 2005 expanded version of the album was reissued on 22 September 2006 in Japan with mini LP/paper sleeve packaging through Arcangelo. The album was also included in a limited edition Japanese box set, comprising all six of Sanctuary Records expanded and remastered releases with mini LP/paper sleeve packaging. The set included an outer box with Magnum's Chase the Dragon artwork.

== Artwork ==
The cover art was designed by Rodney Matthews.

"The Eleventh Hour! illustration was mostly the brainchild of Magnum's Tony (the hat) Clarkin, a likeable 'Brummie' of eccentric appearance. He came to my studio where we listened to lyrics and he scribbled out a little sketch indicating the figure on the throne, the group of young children and the industrial wasteland. The aircraft (like ducks on a wall) and the unreasoning shark missiles in their silos were my own contribution.

"Tony had joked that his idea for the title of the record had come from his impression of Jet Records who appeared to leave everything until the last minute, though he did explain a deeper significance, one which I think becomes obvious from the artwork.

"Many of Clarkin's lyrics show a deep concern for the shortcomings of our civilization and the injustices which occur, although he is not advocating any revolutionary solutions. The changes have to come from each individual." – Rodney Matthews

"Magnum's The Eleventh Hour! was another Tony Clarkin design and is a sort of "Last Days" scenario." – Rodney Matthews

== Bonus tracks ==
In 2005, Sanctuary Records released a remastered and expanded edition with bonus tracks.

"The Word" (disc 1, track 11)
"This was recorded in 1982 at Portland Studios, London and we decided to commission Louis Clarke (at great expense) to arrange and conduct The London Philharmonic Orchestra, subsequently recorded at Abbey Road Studios, London." – Tony Clarkin

This track was later released as the B-side to "Just Like an Arrow".

"True Fine Love" (disc 1, track 12)
"This was recorded at Portland Studios in early 1982 and was originally intended for "The Eleventh Hour" but was thought to be a bit too rock 'n' roll for that album. We are pleased to see its release now." – Tony Clarkin

"The Prize", "Breakdown", "Vicious Companions" and "Road to Paradise" (disc 1, tracks 13–16)
These tracks were recorded for a Radio 1 Friday Rock Show Session on 13 May 1983. The session has Robin George on rhythm guitar and was first broadcast on 27 May 1983. The session was produced by Tony Wilson and engineered by Dave Dade.

"The Prize" and "One Night of Passion" (disc 1, tracks 17–18)
Were released in 1993 on Magnum's acoustic album Keeping the Nite Light Burning.

== Track listing ==
All tracks are written by Tony Clarkin.

Original 1983 release
No.	Title	Length
1.	"The Prize"	3:39
2.	"Breakdown"	3:59
3.	"The Great Disaster"	3:46
4.	"Vicious Companions"	3:36
5.	"So Far Away"	4:35
6.	"Hit and Run"	3:39
7.	"One Night of Passion"	3:48
8.	"The Word"	4:54
9.	"Young and Precious Souls"	4:03
10.	"Road to Paradise"	3:30

2005 expanded edition
No.	Title	Length
11.	"The Word" (featuring the London Philharmonic Orchestra)	4:58
12.	"True Fine Love" (Outtake)	3:22
13.	"The Prize" (BBC Friday Rock Show Session)	3:26
14.	"Breakdown" (BBC Friday Rock Show Session)	3:53
15.	"Vicious Companions" (BBC Friday Rock Show Session)	3:25
16.	"Road to Paradise" (BBC Friday Rock Show Session)	3:30
17.	"The Prize" (1993 Acoustic Recording)	4:37
18.	"One Night of Passion" (1993 Acoustic Recording)	3:48

== Personnel ==
- Bob Catley – vocals
- Tony Clarkin – guitar
- Wally Lowe – bass guitar
- Mark Stanway – keyboards
- Kex Gorin – drums

Additional musicians

- Robin George – rhythm guitar on tracks 13–16

Production

- Recorded at Portland Studios, London
- Mixed at Odyssey Studios, London
- Produced by Tony Clarkin
- Assisted by Bob Catley
- Engineered by Dave Garland

== Charts ==
Chart (1983)	Peak position
UK Albums (OCC)	38

== Release history ==
Release date	Format(s)	Label	Catalogue number	Notes
May 1983	LP, PD	Jet Records	JETLP240, JETPD240	
January 1987	CD	Jet Records	JETCD005	
June 1988	LP, PD, CD	FM Records	WKFMLP111, WKFMPD111, WKFMXD111	
January 1991	CD	Castle Communications	CLACD223	
August 1999	CD	Castle Essentials	ESMCD751	Includes bonus tracks
October 2005	CD	Sanctuary Records	CMQDD1232	Remastered and expanded with bonus tracks
2020/2021	LP	Renaissance Records US	RDEGLP888	
