= In Search of Forever =

In Search of Forever is a science fiction art book by Rodney Matthews published by Paper Tiger Books in 1985.

== Plot summary ==
In Search of Forever is a book of paintings, sketches, photographs, and commentary.

== Reception ==
Dave Langford reviewed In Search of Forever for White Dwarf #72, and stated that "Grab this and get his Witch World covers without having to buy dreadful Andre Norton books..."

== Reviews ==
- Review by Chris Morgan (1985) in Fantasy Review, November 1985
- Review by Don D'Ammassa (1986) in Science Fiction Chronicle, #87 December 1986
