= Lee Morris =

Lee Morris may refer to:

- Lee Morris (American football) (born 1964), American football player
- Lee Morris (footballer) (born 1980), English footballer
- Lee Morris (musician) (born 1970), English drummer
