= Wings of Heaven =

Studio album by Magnum
- Released: 28 March 1988
- Recorded: 1987–1988
- Studios: Wisseloord Studios, Hilversum, Netherlands
- Genre: Hard rock
- Length: 44:07
- Label: Polydor
- Producers: Albert Boekholt, Magnum

Magnum chronology
Mirador (1987)	Wings of Heaven (1988)	Invasion Live (1989)

Professional ratings
Review scores
Source	Rating
AllMusic	2/5 stars

Wings of Heaven is the seventh studio album by the English rock band Magnum, released on 28 March 1988.

The original choice of producers for Wings of Heaven was Roger Taylor and Dave Richards, who had produced Vigilante. This was not realised because of conflicting schedules. Albert Boekholt was suggested at Wisseloord Studios, the Netherlands. The album was mixed at Sarm West Studios in London in January 1988. One song was announced, "That's How The Blues Must Start", but was dropped from the album.

Wings of Heaven was their first studio album to gain both critical and commercial success and the first to achieve a top 10 placing, which it did in Sweden #2, the UK #5, Switzerland #7 and Norway #8. It also made the Top 20 in Germany hitting #19. The album is certified Silver in the United Kingdom, meaning it has shipped over 60,000 copies.

In November 2007, Magnum toured the UK celebrating the 20th anniversary of the album. These shows were recorded for the Wings of Heaven Live album in 2008. The entire album was played live including the song "Different Worlds", never performed by the band on the original Wings of Heaven tour in 1988.

== Track listing ==
All tracks are written by Tony Clarkin.

Original 1988 release
No.	Title	Length
1.	"Days of No Trust"	5:23
2.	"Wild Swan"	6:15
3.	"Start Talking Love"	3:36
4.	"One Step Away"	4:39
5.	"It Must Have Been Love"	5:16
6.	"Different Worlds"	4:39
7.	"Pray for the Day"	3:45
8.	"Don't Wake the Lion (Too Old To Die Young)"	10:34

Bonus track on 12" picture disc
No.	Title	Length
9.	"C'est La Vie"	4:13

== Singles ==
Days of No Trust 7" (March 1988)

1. "Days of No Trust" [edit] – 3:46
2. "Maybe Tonight" [B-side] – 4:39

Days of No Trust 12" (March 1988)

1. "Days of No Trust" [edit] – 3:46
2. "Maybe Tonight" [B-side] – 4:39
3. "The Spirit" [live] – 3:47
4. "Two Hearts" [live] – 6:31

Days of No Trust CD (March 1988)

1. "Days of No Trust" [edit] – 3:46
2. "Maybe Tonight" [B-side] – 4:39
3. "Days of No Trust" [extended] – 5:08
4. "How Far Jerusalem" [live] – 6:25

Days of No Trust 12" picture disc (March 1988)

1. "Days of No Trust" [edit] – 3:46
2. "The Spirit" [live] – 3:47
3. "Two Hearts" [live] – 6:31

Start Talking Love 7" (May 1988)

1. "Start Talking Love" [7" version] – 4:04
2. "C'est La Vie" [bonus title] – 4:13

Start Talking Love 12" (May 1988)

1. "Start Talking Love" [extended remix] – 5:36
2. "C'est La Vie" [bonus title] – 4:11
3. "Back to Earth" [live] – 3:30
4. "On a Storyteller's Night" [live] – 5:12

Start Talking Love 10" picture disc (May 1988)

1. "Start Talking Love" [extended remix] – 5:40
2. "C'est La Vie" [bonus title] – 4:13
3. "Days of No Trust" [LP version] – 5:23

Start Talking Love CD (May 1988)

1. "Start Talking Love" [7" version] – 4:04
2. "C'est La Vie" [bonus title] – 4:13
3. "Start Talking Love" [extended] – 5:40
4. "Sacred Hour" [live] – 5:19

It Must Have Been Love 7" (June 1988)

1. "It Must Have Been Love" [edit] – 4:00
2. "Crying Time" [B-side] – 4:47

It Must Have Been Love 12" (June 1988)

1. "It Must Have Been Love" [edit] – 4:00
2. "Crying Time" [B-side] – 4:47
3. "Lonely Night" [live] – 4:12
4. "Just Like an Arrow" [live] – 5:01

It Must Have Been Love CD (June 1988)

1. "It Must Have Been Love" [edit] – 4:00
2. "Crying Time" [B-side] – 4:47
3. "Lonely Night" [live] – 4:12
4. "The Lights Burned Out" [live] – 5:01

== The Songs ==
"Days of No Trust"
"Half of this song was written in Switzerland after we'd finished recording the 'VIGILANTE' album at Montreux and that LP was being mixed. I still had some ideas in my head. So I started to write things down, including the original idea for the chorus.

"It's pretty self-explanatory as a song and refers to a lot of different aspects of life. There's even a knock at Magnum because on one tour (the 'VIGILANTE' tour of late '86) we used a Cadillac to travel around. We did it for the fun of it, although in a way it was also done so that people would recognise us… and it worked. The line in the song that says. 'Headlines are courted by stretch limousines' was about us!

"I suppose you can read into the song a statement about the Reagan-Gorbachov talks as well, which are going to prove to be ultimately superfluous, because however many missiles the Americans and Russians agree to get rid of they'll still have hundreds of the damn things!

"It's not meant to be a depressing song, nor a whole negative one. But what I'm trying to say is that for Christ sake we're all fooling ourselves and we just carry on 'Living the same old lies'. We see on TV what goes on in the world and we never do anything about it, me included. I write a song about it… big deal!" – Tony Clarkin

"Wild Swan"
"This was written in England and the idea came from a TV programme that showed some birds still quite alive and even flying, yet they had crossbow bolts straight through their bodies! This gave me the idea for the song and from there I imagined a person taking the part of a swan in an almost fairy tale manner.

"It really is about the search for safety, following the river down to the sea and then on to an imaginary safe place. I was thinking in video terms with this song, with a person flying over Sailsbury Plains and looking down seeing everything passing under them. In fact, there were verses that further emphasised this point, but we had to cut them because the song was too long.

"It was a search for safety, the journey out to sea to discover the place where you'd be safe from all the horrible things which could happen to you.

"It's probably a sub-conscious follow-on from 'DAYS OF NO TRUST'. In fact, a lot of the songs that I write tag on from the previous one I'd done". – Tony Clarkin

"Start Talking Love"
"It arose from a point when I was feeling a bit lonely for the women back home! The first part was written at home and then when we went to Wisseloord Studios in Holland to record 'WINGS OF HEAVEN', Wally, Bob and I went into a spare studio and we messed about with the basic concept of the number. Anyway, Albert Boekholt (co-producer) heard it and thought it sounded really good. But I didn't have any words for it. So I got the tune together… and actually wrote the music for the chorus in about 20 seconds there and then! And the words for the chorus just came out, sounding really good.

"Of course, now I had to write the verses. So I went back to the Amityville Horror House (the band's abode during their sojourn in Holland) and I was just sitting there with a lit candle and a glass of wine and I felt a bit lonely, slightly sorry for myself. And the verse came to me as being about separation from someone you really love". – Tony Clarkin

"It Must Have Been Love"
"This was a song trying to take the opposite point of view to most rock bands when it comes to male-female relationships. Most bands go for the clichéd mach 'been with this woman, been with that woman' style. I tried to look at it from the woman's angle, which was quite difficult. You get so many stupid blokes boasting about their 'conquests' and nine times out of ten it's just lies.

"The song also suggests that women seem to be a lot stronger than men in everyday situations. They are the ones who hold families together and are the backbone, while men seem to be dreamers all the time… or at least that's my experience. We are less practical as a gender". – Tony Clarkin

"Different Worlds"
"In a way it's a follow-up to 'How Far Jerusalem', although it was never conceived in that fashion. It's based on something I saw whilst on holiday in the South of France.

"We were staying at this unbelievable place, with a swimming pool and garden and the sun was blazing… it was fantastic. Anyway we went down to Nice and we walked into an antiques market which was changing ridiculous amounts of money for this crazy stuff… nothing that interested me. So we decided to go into the old town and there were people walking around draped in jewellery. Yet I literally walked on a few more yards and suddenly there was a narrow avenue which had excretia everywhere and people where lying in doorways with bottles. It was really hard to comprehend when you see the two extremes of life back to back like that.

"Later on I was having something to eat in a really plush joint and this woman came up to me with a little kid and asked for money! I know these things happen all over the place but when it smacks you in the face you realise how crazy it all is.

"I don't want to come across in any song, though, as a pious twerp telling everyone what they should or shouldn't be doing. Everybody knows that people shouldn't starve to death, but what is a normal bloke, who works five days a week on normal wages with his own family to support, going to do about the situation? Public opinion can achieve a certain amount, but it's up to governments and those with a lot of money to make a difference. So I'm always afraid of coming across as preaching in songs, because I HATE being preached at. If someone does that to me, then I turn my back and I'm off. So what I'm really doing is preaching to MYSELF. I know I always need constantly reminding of what goes on in the world. You can watch a programme on TV that'll make you weep, and suddenly there'll be a commercial break… and you will feel a sense of relief because you want to get away from the horror of reality". – Tony Clarkin

"One Step Away"
"This is rather a magical song. I just imagined some evil spirit tempting a person to come with them. It's got a Steven Spielberg feel to it. The notion of a fella being persuaded by a beautiful temptress who could do all manner of magic. But he resists and tells her that it's wrong and evil… stay away!

"I suppose in a way it does hark back in style from my early form of writing songs. Over the past couple of albums I've broken away from this fantasy approach, which is an easy style to write in as there are no limits put on you, because I couldn't come up with anything new to say. Mind you, it's much harder to write straight-down-the-line, contemporary lyrics due to the fact that it has to be totally and utterly understandable – more obvious. But I've enjoyed dealing with realistic subjects, although when I was writing in a magical/fantasy way to me there was always an underlying sense of reality. All my songs have been based on the real world.

"As a lyricist, I probably write any set of words about 15 or 20 times in various guises, changing the odd line here and there. And even six months on, I'll notice a stupid little grammatical error that drives me up the wall but is fundamental to anyone that speaks English. I've got a pile of papers with millions of 'wrong' things on 'em, but usually I'll end up with just one copy of the final draft, which I give to Bob… and he loses them. I would love at some point to publish a book of real poetry, although I don't think my lyrics stand up as poetry, if only because in a song the damn lines have to rhyme, whereas in poetry you have more freedom to express yourself, less restrictions". – Tony Clarkin

"Pray for the Day"
"I got the idea for this in Austria. We were staying at a ski lodge whilst doing a festival and was right at the top of a mountain – hence the line 'On top of the world nothing breaks in' – and one day I wend down the road and there were lots of churches, all with wrought iron crosses having black ribbons and gauze hanging off. That reminded me of visiting the Berlin Wall, because along the entire wall are crosses marking spots where people had been shot and killed trying to escape. This in turn triggered off a childhood memory of watching a TV programme that shows a kid hanging in the barbed wire, dying bit by bit. Nobody could do anything for him; he'd been shot and left hanging. Eventually he died". – Tony Clarkin

"Don't Wake the Lion (Too Old To Die Young)"
"The first part was written in Germany and was inspired by the band's sound engineer! One day the two of us were talking about stand-up comics and he mentioned one particular comic, whose name I forget, but was very famous in the George Formby era. Anyway, he used to say to his wife, 'It were the day that war broke out' in a broad Lancashire accent. And that triggered off the song and once I started writing the whole song just poured out. At the time, there was no tune for it, which is very unusual for me.

"I wanted a song that could be looked at from both sides. It's obviously about the futility of war, an anti-war tune. But I wanted something that a German person could read and feel the same emotions as an English person.

"The middle part, which is actually a separate number called 'Too Old To Die Young' was written at the SFX Hall, Dublin… in a dressing room. I was thinking about myself. You know you get people saying that you should have a good time and die young, have a good looking corpse like James Dean. But I'm now too old for all of that, the option doesn't exist for me any more. I am who I am and if I depart this planet now it won't be in what I suppose some might call the rock 'n' roll fashion.

"I think we've all seen the films where the troops have gone 'over the top' from the trenches… and they knew they'd all be killed. What do you do in a situation like that? Fortunately, I've never had to face it, but it's crazy from all sides. No-one wants to go to war. It starts so often with a misplaced word, and gets bigger and bigger and bigger until suddenly… one minute you're at home and the next you're fighting. You'd smack a kid across the head for letting it get out of hand THAT far. Yet adults go to the point where they want to destroy the Earth!

"The actual title 'DON'T WAKE THE LION' means don't let anger get the better of you. The 'Lion' doesn't stand, as some might think, for Britain. It refers to the 'Lion' that exist in every single person. It's better to keep that side of you hidden". – Tony Clarkin

== Personnel ==
- Bob Catley – vocals
- Tony Clarkin – guitar
- Wally Lowe – bass guitar
- Mark Stanway – keyboards
- Mickey Barker – drums

Additional musicians

- Attie Bauw – Fairlight programmer
- The London Gospel Choir – backing vocals on "It Must Have Been Love"
- Max Werner – backing vocals on "Different Worlds"

== Charts ==
Chart (1988)	Peak position
Finnish Albums (The Official Finnish Charts)	18
German Albums (Offizielle Top 100)	19
Norwegian Albums (VG-lista)	8
Swedish Albums (Sverigetopplistan)	2
Swiss Albums (Schweizer Hitparade)	7
UK Albums (Official Charts)	5

== Certifications ==
Region	Certification	Certified units/sales
United Kingdom (BPI)	Silver	60,000^{^}
^{^} Shipments figures based on certification alone.
