= Kingdom of Madness (Magnum album) =

Studio album by Magnum
- Released: August 1978
- Recorded: 1975–1976
- Studios: De Lane Lea Studios, London
- Genre: Progressive rock
- Length: 39:31
- Label: Jet
- Producer: Jake Commander

Magnum chronology
Kingdom of Madness (1978)	Magnum II (1979)

Singles from Kingdom of Madness
- 1. "Kingdom of Madness" Released: 14 July 1978; 2. "Universe" Released: 29 September 1978; 3. "Baby Rock Me" Released: May 1979 (US)

Alternative cover

Professional ratings
Review scores
Source	Rating
AllMusic	4/5 stars
Kerrang!	3/5 stars

Kingdom of Madness is the debut studio album by the English rock band Magnum. It was recorded in 1976, and was released in 1978 by Jet Records. Kingdom of Madness was awarded a four-star review in Sounds, with writer Geoff Barton suggesting the band were capable of making a strong claim for a slice of the market occupied by the likes of Styx, Kansas and Yes.

The album was described as "flute-laced progressive rock sound similar to that of Jethro Tull. The songwriting ranges from imaginative, mythical tales on "In the Beginning" and the title song, to deeply philosophical tracks like "Universe" and "All That Is Real"." The album was also noted for its imaginative lyrics, with influence from Hawkwind member, Blue Öyster Cult lyricist and science fiction author Michael Moorcock, the songs "Lord of Chaos" and "Stormbringer" directly referencing Moorcock's Elric series.

Prior to the release, Magnum had toured the UK extensively with the likes of Judas Priest and had built upon a solid fanbase. Many of the songs had been played in Magnum's live set since 1976, and were suitably "road tested". Many fans were familiar with the material before the album was released, this helped the album debut at a respectable No. 58 in the UK charts. Because of the delayed release the tracks "Master of Disguise", "Without Your Love", "Find the Time" and "Everybody Needs" originally intended for the album, were dropped for more up-to-date songs, such as opening track "In the Beginning". These tracks were later included on Sanctuary Records' 2005 2-CD remastered and expanded edition of the album. Two singles were released to promote the album, "Kingdom of Madness" in July 1978 and "Invasion" in September 1978, although Magnum's debut single for CBS, "Sweets for My Sweet", released in February 1975, was not included on the album. The 2005 expanded version of the album was reissued on 22 September 2006 in Japan with Mini LP/Paper Sleeve packaging through Arcangelo. The album was also included in a limited edition Japanese Box Set, comprising all six of Sanctuary Records Expanded and Remastered releases with Mini LP/Paper Sleeve packaging. The set included an outer box featuring Magnum's Chase the Dragon artwork.

== Track listing ==
All tracks are written by Tony Clarkin.

Original 1978 release
No.	Title	Length
1.	"In the Beginning"	7:52
2.	"Baby Rock Me"	4:05
3.	"Universe"	3:45
4.	"Kingdom of Madness"	4:25
5.	"All That Is Real"	3:48
6.	"The Bringer"	4:58
7.	"Invasion"	3:22
8.	"Lords of Chaos"	3:21
9.	"All Come Together"	4:52

Disc 2 (2005 expanded edition)
No.	Title	Writer(s)	Length
1.	"Sea Bird" (Demo)		3:49
2.	"Stormbringer" (Demo)		3:31
3.	"Slipping Away" (Demo)		3:15
4.	"Captain America" (Demo)		3:43
5.	"Sweets for My Sweet"	Doc Pomus, Mort Shuman	3:02
6.	"Movin' On"		3:47
7.	"Master of Disguise" (Outtake)		2:54
8.	"Without Your Love" (Outtake)		3:45
9.	"Find the Time" (Outtake)		3:04
10.	"Everybody Needs" (Outtake)		3:47
11.	"Kingdom of Madness" (Alternate Version)		3:56

1–4 demo recorded at Nest Studios, Birmingham, 1974
5–6 taken from Magnum's rare first single Sweets for My Sweet in 1975
7–10 outtakes from the Kingdom of Madness sessions in 1976 at De Lane Lea Studios
11 alternate recording, recorded at Battle Studios, Hastings in 1979
1–4, 7–11 originally appeared on Magnum's 1993 compilation Archive

== Reissues ==
Release date	Formats	Label	Catalogue number	Notes
08/1978	LP	Jet Records	JETLP210	"King" Sleeve
03/1987	LP, CD, Cassette	Castle Communications	CLALP126, CLACD126, CLAMC126	
01/1988	CD	Jet Records	JETCD001	
01/1989	LP, PD, CD	FM Records	WKFMLP118, WKFMPD118, WKFMCD118	Rodney Matthews artwork
08/1999	CD	Castle Essentials	ESMCD747	Includes bonus tracks
10/2005	2CD	Sanctuary Records	CMQDD1228	Remastered and expanded with bonus disc of rarities
2020/2021	LP	Renaissance Records US	RDEGLP884	

== Bonus tracks ==
In 2005, Sanctuary Records released a remastered and expanded edition with a bonus disc.

"Sea Bird", "Slipping Away", "Stormbringer" and "Captain America" (disc 2, tracks 1–4)
"These four tracks where the first ever recordings of Magnum and were recorded at one of Birmingham's foremost studios "Nest" in 1974. A time whilst Magnum initially searched for a musical identity." – Tony Clarkin

These tracks originally appeared on Magnum's 1993 compilation Archive.

"Sweets for My Sweet" and "Movin' On" (disc 2, tracks 5–6)
These tracks were taken from Magnum's rare first single in 1975 – a cover of The Searcher's "Sweets for My Sweet". "Movin' On" was Tony Clarkin's and Magnum's first original song.

"Master of Disguise", "Without Your Love", "Find the Time" and "Everybody Needs" (disc 2, tracks 7–10)
"These four tracks were recorded during the Kingdom of Madness sessions in 1976 at De Lane Lea Studios but never made the album. A different version of "Everybody Needs" was originally released as the B-Side of the "Changes" single." – Tony Clarkin

These tracks originally appeared on Magnum's 1993 compilation Archive.

"Kingdom of Madness" (disc 2, track 11)
"We didn't actually think there could be another version of this track not already released but, here it is. Recorded at Battle Studios, Hastings in 1979." – Tony Clarkin

These tracks originally appeared on Magnum's 1993 compilation Archive.

== Singles ==
Sweets for My Sweet 7" (February 1975)

1. "Sweets for My Sweet" [A-Side] (Doc Pomus and Mort Shuman) – 3:02
2. "Movin' On" [B-Side] – 3:47

Kingdom of Madness 7" (July 1978)

1. "Kingdom of Madness" [Edit] – 0:00
2. "In the Beginning" [Edit] – 4:17

Invasion 7" (September 1978)

1. "Invasion" [LP Version] – 3:22
2. "Universe" [LP Version] – 3:45

== Personnel ==
- Bob Catley – vocals
- Tony Clarkin – guitar
- Wally Lowe – bass
- Richard Bailey – keyboards, flute
- Kex Gorin – drums
- Dave Morgan – bass, vocals (on disc 2, tracks 1–6)

Production

- Produced by Jake Commander
- Recorded at De Lane Lea Studios
- Engineered by Dick Plant, Barry Kidd, Dave Strickland
- Mastered at De Lane Lea Studios by Kevin Metcalf

== Related information ==
Kingdom of Madness is also the debut album of German power metal band Edguy, whose lead singer Tobias Sammet has collaborated with Magnum lead singer Bob Catley on his Avantasia project.

Kingdom of Madness are a UK band formed in 2018 by ex-Magnum keyboardist Mark Stanway featuring drummer Micky Barker, keyboardist and flautist Richard Bailey, Mo Birch (vocals and percussion), Alan Bell on guitar, Brian Badhams on bass and vocalist Chris Dando. They are on tour performing Classic Magnum from the celebrated 1978 to 1994 era.

== Charts ==
Chart (1978)	Peak position
UK Albums (Official Charts)	58
