= Invasion Live =

Live album by Magnum
- Released: May 1989
- Recorded: Nashville, Tennessee; United States of America; 1982
- Length: 41:32
- Label: Receiver Records

Magnum chronology
Wings of Heaven (1988)	Invasion Live (1989)	Foundation (1990)

Invasion Live is a live album by the English rock band Magnum. It was released in 1989 by Receiver Records. All tracks were recorded at the Municipal Auditorium in Nashville, Tennessee, on 29 April 1982, whilst supporting Ozzy Osbourne.

Most of the material released here was used as bonus tracks for Magnum's expanded and remastered series on Sanctuary Records.

== Track listing ==
All tracks are written by Tony Clarkin, except where noted

Original 1989 release
No.	Title	Writer(s)	Length
1.	"Soldier of the Line"		3:51
2.	"Reborn"		5:59
3.	"Sacred Hour"		5:45
4.	"The Spirit"		4:35
5.	"Changes"		3:51
6.	"All of My Life"		6:13
7.	"Invasion"		5:10
8.	"Kingdom of Madness"		3:57
9.	"Runaround Sue"	Dion DiMucci, Ernie Maresca	3:29

== Personnel ==
- Tony Clarkin — guitar
- Bob Catley — vocals
- Wally Lowe — bass guitar
- Mark Stanway — keyboards
- Kex Gorin — drums
