= Magnum (band) =

British rock band

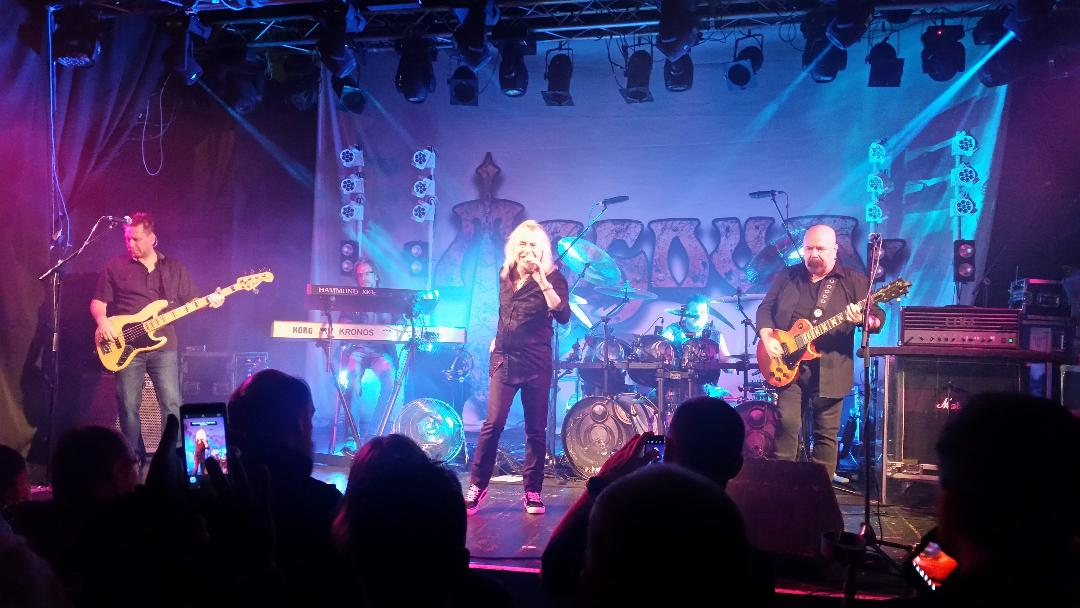
- Magnum in 2018

Background information
- Origin: Birmingham, England
- Genres: Hard rock, AOR, melodic rock
- Years active: 1972–1995, 2001–present
- Labels: CBS, Jet, FM, Polydor, Music for Nations, EMI, SPV
- Spinoffs: Hard Rain
- Members: Bob Catley; Rick Benton; Harry James; Dennis Ward; Brendon Riley
- Past members: Tony Clarkin; Bob Doyle; Kex Gorin; Dave Morgan; Richard Bailey; Colin "Wally" Lowe; Mark Stanway; Eddie George; Jim Simpson; Mickey Barker; Al Barrow; Harry James; Jimmy Copley; Lee Morris
- Website: magnumonline.co.uk

Magnum are an English melodic hard rock band. They were formed in Birmingham in 1972 by Tony Clarkin (guitar, songwriter, producer) and Bob Catley (vocals) in order to appear as the resident band at the Rum Runner nightclub in the city. Magnum have undergone several changes in personnel over the years; however, the core of Catley and Clarkin remained until Clarkin's death in 2024.

Magnum's most significant early success was Chase the Dragon in 1982, which reached number 17 in the UK Albums Chart. It included several songs that would become mainstays of the band's live set, notably "Soldier of the Line", "Sacred Hour" and "The Spirit". On a Storyteller's Night gave the band its breakthrough in Europe, and achieved a Gold certification in the United Kingdom. The band's 1986 album Vigilante represented a further move towards the mainstream before the band achieved their commercial peak in 1988 when they entered the UK Top Ten for the first time with the album Wings of Heaven, which reached number five and featured three Top 40 singles, "Days of No Trust", "Start Talking Love" and "It Must Have Been Love". It was followed by Goodnight L.A., which was produced by Keith Olsen and reached number nine in the UK Albums Chart in 1990. It produced another Top 40 single for the band, "Rockin' Chair".

In 1995, Clarkin announced Magnum's split; however, Clarkin and Catley continued working together, now under the name Hard Rain, until 1999. Magnum reformed in 2001 and enjoyed late-career commercial success. Their latest album, Here Comes the Rain, was released in January 2024, five days after Clarkin's death. Debuting at number 2 in the German charts, it is the highest-charting album there in the band's history.

Magnum have since been co-managed by Clarkin’s daughter Dionne Clarkin and her business partner Ed Cutler who together formed Magnum Music Productions Ltd announcing a January 2025 five-date UK tour in order to honour Clarkin's legacy.

In late 2026 Clarkin & Cutler restructured the band and crew welcoming back Harry James as the bands Drummer and Pete Russell as Front of House Sound Engineer.

== History ==
=== Early years (1972–1977) ===
Magnum's roots were in the house band at Birmingham's famous Rum Runner night club (later the home of Duran Duran) in 1972. Joining Clarkin and Catley were drummer Kex Gorin (born Kevin Gorin, 26 January 1949, Gorin died 21 December 2007) and bassist Bob Doyle. The band line up remained the same until later in 1972, when Les Kitcheridge joined temporarily on rhythm guitar. Clarkin had left the band and it was at this stage that the band was renamed Magnum with Clarkin rejoining thereafter. Bob Doyle left Magnum in 1972 and joined Roy Wood's Wizzard, and was replaced by former Uglys and Balls bassist Dave Morgan (later a member of ELO). Richard Bailey joined on keyboards in June 1973, before going on a two-year sabbatical in South Africa the next year.

The band began to develop its own style by playing Clarkin's songs at a residency at The Railway Inn, in Birmingham's Curzon Street, in 1976. In 1975, Clarkin and Dave Morgan received an offer from Kim Holmes to help with the construction of a studio, rather than being paid with money, Clarkin requested to be paid with studio time. Much of Magnum's early demo material was recorded at Nest Studios in Birmingham, which would later lead to a recording contract with David Arden of Jet Records. During the "Nest" sessions, at least two songs written by Dave Morgan (and sung by Bob Catley) were recorded but never released. The titles were "Baby I Need" and "One More Round The Bend", which resurfaced on an acetate disc in 2005.

A one off deal with CBS was arranged via producer Roger Greenaway, and the band released a cover of The Searchers' "Sweets for My Sweet" in February 1975; however, this failed to make the charts. The original recording included a medley of "God Rest Ye Merry, Gentlemen" but was edited out for the single release. Lead vocals on this song were by Morgan, who left the band soon after, and was replaced by Colin "Wally" Lowe. Success was still minimal; they were working as a backing band for artists, such as Del Shannon, on small tours. The band was expanded to a five-piece with Richard Bailey returning on keyboards. In May 1977 the band supported Judas Priest on their Sin After Sin UK tour, still without the backing of a record label.

=== Jet Records (1978–1984) ===
Magnum's debut album Kingdom of Madness was released on Jet Records at the end of 1978 and reached number 58 in the UK Chart; it received a five star review from Geoff Barton of Sounds magazine. They toured the UK in October/November 1978, as support to David Coverdale's Whitesnake. Leo Lyons, formerly bassist with Ten Years After, produced the follow-up album Magnum II – which was released in 1979, but failed to chart. Another support tour was organised for November 1979, this time with Blue Öyster Cult. A live set, Marauder, was released as an album and reached number 34 in the UK Albuns Chart, and a live double single ("Live at the Marquee", including "Invasion") reached number 48 in the UK Singles Chart. Bailey departed soon after and was replaced temporarily by Grenville Harding during Magnum's support of Def Leppard's On Through the Night UK tour in March. For the second leg in April, permanent replacement Mark Stanway took over keyboard duties. Magnum also appeared at the Reading Festival in 1980. April 1981 saw another support tour, this time with Tygers of Pan Tang on their Spellbound UK tour.

Their first successful album was the Jeff Glixman produced Chase the Dragon (1982), which reached number 17 in the UK, and included several songs that would be mainstays of the band's live set, including "Soldier of the Line", "Sacred Hour" and "The Spirit". Glixman was previously known for his work with Kansas, and this was the first Magnum release to feature the artwork of fantasy artist Rodney Matthews. The tour included a support slot in February with Krokus, on their One Vice at a Time UK tour. A few United States dates were played during the summer of 1982, supporting labelmate Ozzy Osbourne. The band returned to the UK in July for their own headlining tour.

Budgetary constraints at Jet denied Magnum the use of an outside producer for 1983's Clarkin-produced The Eleventh Hour, which peaked at UK number 38. A UK tour started in May 1983, featuring additional guitarist Robin George for live performances. Magnum also appeared at the 1983 Reading Festival, with George. However, Jet was unhappy about the sales figures of The Eleventh Hour, and refused to support another album or finance a tour. Magnum and Jet parted company shortly afterwards, Kex Gorin was replaced by Jim Simpson and Stanway departed the band to work with Phil Lynott, being replaced by Eddie George. Local businessman Keith Baker (Time Music) engaged the band, an independent tour was organised for February 1984 without the backing of a record label. During the tour, Clarkin's mother died and Clarkin himself became seriously ill, forcing the band to complete the tour without him. Laurence Archer was hired as a temporary guitar player. Clarkin had still not recovered when the tour was over, and it looked like the band would not be able to carry on. Catley was also forced to look for a new job, but Clarkin recovered and the band went on to play a number of Christmas shows. They recruited Jim Simpson on drums, while Eddie George replaced Stanway on keyboards. Following the successful Christmas shows, the band decided to make another album.

=== On a Storyteller's Night and commercial success years (1985–1995) ===
In 1984, Magnum signed a one-off deal with FM Records. George left a few months later, but Stanway soon rejoined and the band went to the studio. In May 1985, they released On a Storyteller's Night, which had a cover by Rodney Matthews. It reached number 24 in the UK, and launched the band across Europe. Soon after, Simpson left the band to join UFO, and was replaced by the 32-year-old, self-taught Mickey Barker.

From the success of On a Storyteller's Night, Keith Baker negotiated a major label deal with Polydor Records, and they embarked on the most commercially successful period of their career; opening the Monsters of Rock festival at Castle Donington in August 1985, on a bill that also included Bon Jovi, Metallica, Marillion and headliners ZZ Top. A second leg for the Storyteller's tour was concluded in December 1985.

The first release for Polydor was in September 1986, entitled Vigilante. The album was a move towards the mainstream due to production by Queen drummer Roger Taylor and David Richards, who had recently worked together on A Kind of Magic. The switch to Polydor saw an increase in the marketing budget, and promotional videos were made for the singles "Lonely Night" and "Midnight". A full UK and European tour was scheduled in March 1986, including appearances at a festival at Milton Keynes Bowl headlined by Marillion in June and the German Out in the Green festivals in Dinkelsbühl and at the Loreley Open-Air Theatre. A second leg was organised in September 1986, which finished in Europe in November 1986. Stanway commented, "with only one tour of Germany we had already achieved as much success as after ten years in England!" In March 1987, the band embarked on a third UK and European tour, including an appearance at 1987's Reading Festival.

Magnum enjoyed increased success with the album Wings of Heaven (number 5 in the UK). Three singles from Wings of Heaven reached the UK Top 40, including a Top of the Pops appearance with "Start Talking Love". The album also became the band's first to chart in Norway and Switzerland. A successful tour followed in December and, by now, Magnum had been elevated to an 'arena' band in the UK, headlining the N.E.C. and several nights at London's Hammersmith Odeon, supported by the Norwegian band Stage Dolls. There were talks about touring the United States with Iron Maiden, but nothing came of it.

Following the success of Wings of Heaven, Polydor eyed an opportunity to break Magnum in the United States. To adjust to the American market, the record company convinced Clarkin to work with co-songwriters. The band went to Los Angeles for the Keith Olsen produced Goodnight L.A., which peaked at number 9 in the UK chart. However, the album was never released in the United States, and received backlash from critics for being "commercial" and "Americanized". While successful, the album did not live up to its expectations and became a disappointment to the band and the label. Following the release, Magnum performed at Berlin's Arena Festival, followed by a full UK and European tour in September 1990. They toured the UK again in November. After a fallout between the band and the record company, Magnum parted ways with Polydor. They released the live album The Spirit in 1991 and toured the UK and Europe again to support the album. During the concerts in Germany, the band played live with the Roger Taylor band The Cross. Magnum continued to release albums for various labels on one-off deals, the first being Sleepwalking in 1992 on Music for Nations. The album got a mixed reception from critics, some of whom argued that the band was moving in the direction of pop rock. A full UK tour followed in October, and started a tradition of performing Christmas shows in Birmingham. This was followed by the release of Archive in April 1993 by Jet Records, a compilation album that featured four previously unreleased songs from between 1976 and 1983. Polydor released Chapter & Verse – The Very Best of Magnum, another compilation album, a month later. Later the same year, Magnum released Keeping the Nite Light Burning, the band's first and only purely acoustic album.

Rock Art was released in 1994 on EMI, and the album charted at number 57 in the United Kingdom. A UK tour was scheduled for April, but dates in May and June were postponed or cancelled. A low key tour was arranged for August and Europe in September, followed by another tour in the spring 1995. Clarkin wrote eleven new songs for the planned next album, which were recorded and sent to record companies, their contract with EMI having expired. However, they received no offer from any major record company, and the band faced financial difficulties. Meanwhile, Clarkin had started to feel creatively trapped, as fans and critics did not appreciate the band's musical evolution. A growing creative gap between Clarkin and Stanway also caused friction within the band. In September 1995, Clarkin decided to quit. The other band members were shocked by his decision, and attempted to talk him out of it. They briefly considered continuing with a different guitarist, but soon concluded that Clarkin, the band's sole songwriter, was irreplaceable. They managed to talk Clarkin into doing a farewell tour in the United Kingdom and Europe, documented on the live album Stronghold (titled The Last Dance in mainland Europe). After a final concert on 17 December 1995, Magnum disbanded.

=== Split and Hard Rain years (1996–2000) ===
While most band members went their separate ways, Catley and Clarkin continued working together as before and planned a new album. To avoid pressure and interference from the labels, they named themselves Hard Rain rather than continuing as Magnum. Three months after Magnum split, Catley and Clarkin began recording new music. In 1997, they released the eponymous debut album Hard Rain. Most of the songs on the album had been written before the split of Magnum and were originally meant for a Magnum album. The album received positive reviews, and Catley and Clarkin started recruiting more musicians to turn Hard Rain into an actual band. Ex-Magnum drummer Kex Gorin briefly agreed to join the band, before changing his mind. Hard Rain eventually recruited the brothers Rob and Al Barrow as drummer and bassist, respectively, Sue McCloskey for backup vocals, and Paul Hodson on keyboards. The next album, When the Good Times Come, was released in 1999. This album was stylistically different from anything Magnum had released, and received mixed reviews from critics. Hard Rain always included Magnum songs in their live sets, and was widely considered a continuation of Magnum in all but name. The new name was actually detrimental to the sales, as many buyers expected to find the albums in the M-shelf rather than the H-shelf in music stores. The albums would eventually be filed together with Magnum albums. Clarkin and Catley discussed whether they should revert to the name Magnum, but ultimately decided against it. When asked to explain the difference between Magnum and Hard Rain, Clarkin replied that the latter was "a relief, a stop gap, something I wanted to do".

It was around this time that Catley launched a solo career using various songwriters, including Gary Hughes of the band Ten. His first solo album, The Tower, was released in November 1998, followed by Legends a year later and a live album in-between. Additionally, Catley participated in several projects as a guest vocalist, the first of which was Jabberwocky by Oliver Wakeman and Clive Nolan in early-1999. Catley disagreed with Hard Rain's musical drift away from the classical Magnum sound, and soon became more focused on his solo career. In September 1999 he decided to quit Hard Rain, marking the end of a working relationship with Clarkin that dated back to 1972. Clarkin briefly continued Hard Rain with Sue McCloskey replacing Catley as lead vocalist. They performed with this line-up at a charity event in January 2000, but Hard Rain never released any additional new material. A short quiet period ensued, followed by rumours of a Magnum reunion.

During Magnum's split, one of Clarkin's friends found a live recording from 1976 in his loft. Clarkin, fed up with the many unofficial compilations that had been released without the band's authorisation, was initially reluctant to authorise the release of this old material. He eventually changed his mind, and Days of Wonder was released in April 2000.

=== Reformation and renewal (2001–2016) ===
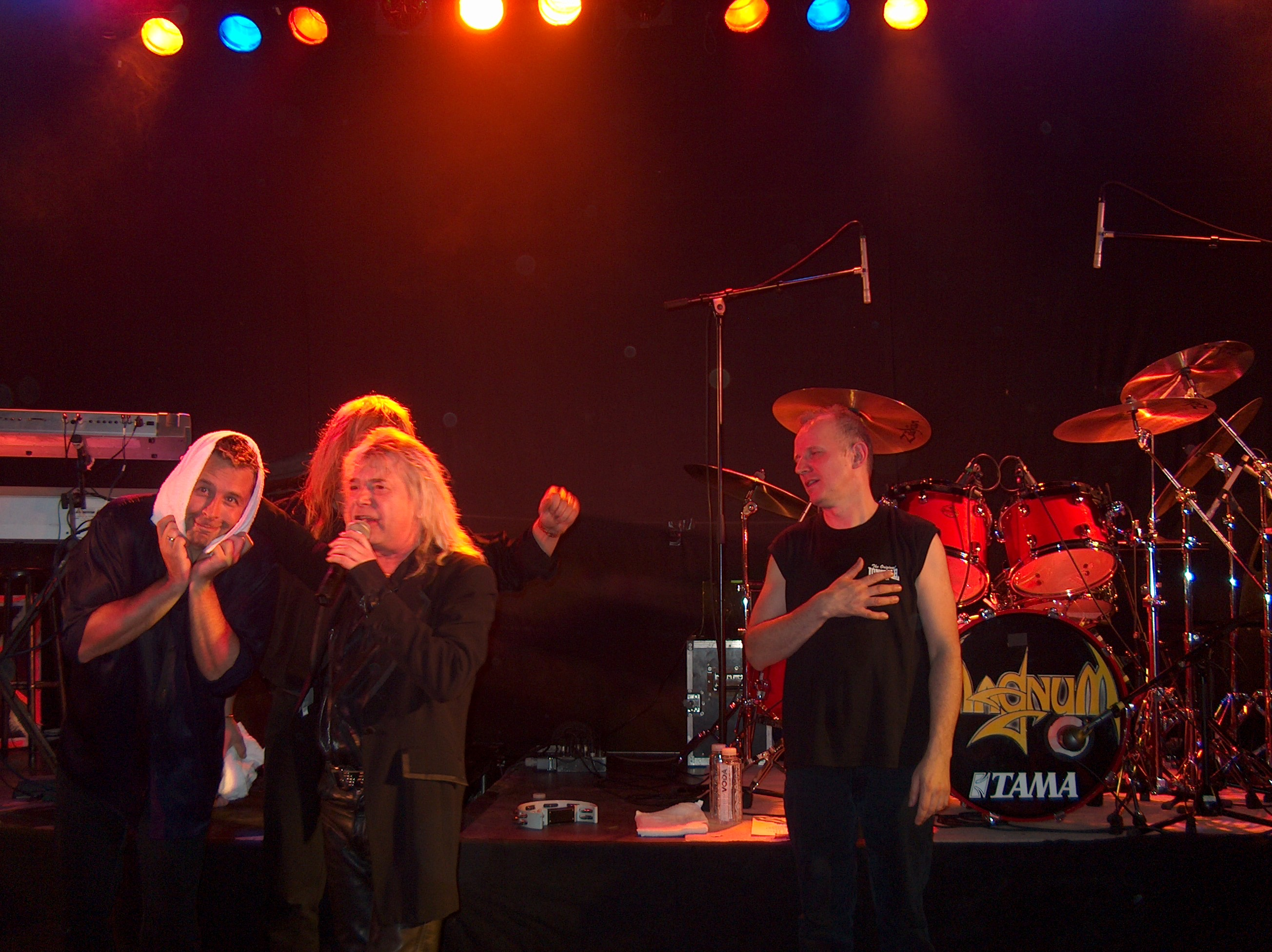
Magnum in Gothenburg, Sweden, 2005

In March 2001, Catley revealed that Clarkin had suggested a reunion, apparently after his manager Derek Kemp had convinced him that giving Magnum a new shot was worth it. Catley and Clarkin had hoped for a complete reunion of the pre-1995 line-up, but only Mark Stanway ended up returning to the band. While Mickey Barker was committed to a different band, Wally Lowe had retired from the music industry. Al Barrow, who had been a member of Hard Rain, continued as the band's bassist. Rob Barrow was invited to stay on as the band's drummer, but he had already decided to quit the music industry. Paul Hodson went on to join Ten.

Clarkin's manager's assessment proved to be correct; while in 1995 the band had difficulties getting a record deal, this time they got several offers. They ultimately signed a deal with SPV Steamhammer in September 2001. In February 2002, Breath of Life was released. The album consisted partly of songs originally written for Hard Rain; according to Catley, it was a mix of Magnum and Hard Rain. They recorded the album without a drummer, before hiring Thunder drummer Harry James to complete the line-up. The band then went on a UK tour in December. The next album, Brand New Morning, was released in 2004. This album represented a final departure from the Hard Rain style; years later, Catley would comment that "Brand New Morning [had] really [been] the first new Magnum album". Magnum then appeared at Germany's Bang Your Head Festival and the Lorca Rock Festival in Spain and went on a tour around the UK and Europe in December. Clarkin commented:

The break since the middle of the Nineties was definitely necessary for me. Since the end of the Seventies, in fact since we embarked on the preparations for our debut recording Kingdom of Madness, not a single month had gone by in which I didn't work for Magnum, composed for the group, or at least thought of them permanently. For almost twenty years, all my thoughts had revolved around the band. I needed a break to clear my head and to be able to devote myself to the band again with renewed energy.

When James returned to Thunder, Jimmy Copley became a full-time member of Magnum. The band toured in April 2005 to mark the 20th anniversary of On a Storyteller's Night; they released a live DVD of the Astoria concert entitled Livin' the Dream, which also included a short documentary and promotional videos from throughout the band's history.

Magnum completed work on a new studio album, Princess Alice and the Broken Arrow, which was released on 26 March 2007; this also marked the return to the cover artwork by Rodney Matthews, absent since 1992. The album entered the UK Albums Chart at number 70, the first time Magnum had charted in the UK since 1994. It also reached number 4 on the BBC Rock Albums Chart and number 60 in Germany. Magnum toured the UK and Europe in May 2007. Harry James played drums temporarily for half the tour as Jimmy Copley had taken ill, and soon replaced Copley permanently within the line-up. Copley died in 2017.

In 2005, former drummer Kex Gorin was diagnosed with kidney cancer. Gorin had a kidney removed and underwent radiotherapy and steroid treatment, but died of the disease on 21 December 2007. In 2007, Magnum played a one-off show at the Robin 2 in Bilston, Wolverhampton. This was a charity event in aid of former drummer Kex Gorin's family. An auction of memorabilia before the show raised over £10,000. Magnum then played a two-hour set of old and new material. Magnum undertook a UK tour celebrating the 20th anniversary of Wings of Heaven in November 2007. These shows were recorded for Wings of Heaven Live album, which was released in March 2008. The album was dedicated to Kex Gorin.

On 15 June 2009, Magnum released Into the Valley of the Moonking on SPV. Stylistically, the album was considered a logical follow-up to Princess Alice, and it became the first Magnum release to chart in Switzerland since Rock Art. A few months later, the band released The Gathering, on Universal/Sanctuary; their first ever cross-career collection spread over five discs featuring a 1988 live recording from Hammersmith Odeon. The next studio album, The Visitation, was released in January 2011, and was notably rockier than previous releases. The band toured in support of the album, which charted at number 55 in the UK and number 19 in Germany, throughout March and April 2011.

On 30 August, Magnum announced a new compilation remix album Evolution celebrating the last 10 years on SPV GmbH since their reformation in 2001. The album was released on 11 November 2011 in Germany and 14 November in the rest of Europe and the UK. The album featured 10 songs from the band's previous five studio releases, eight were re-recorded, remixed and remastered, as well as two new songs.

The band released their 17th studio album On the 13th Day in September 2012. "So Let It Rain" was the first single, released in August 2012 via Steamhammer/SPV. The band toured in Europe to promote the album in late 2012 which charted in many countries across Europe including the UK at number 43. Soon after releasing and touring On the 13th Day Magnum revealed that Clarkin was back in the studio writing and recording new songs via Facebook on 4 April 2013. The new album, called Escape from the Shadow Garden, also was to feature Rodney Matthews's artwork, this time showing similarities to Magnum's early albums Chase the Dragon (the tree) and On a Storyteller's Night (the storyteller), along with elements from more recent albums such as On the 13th Day. Escape From the Shadow Garden was released in Scandinavia on 19 March 2014, and on 21 March for Germany, Austria and Switzerland, 24 March for the rest of Europe, and 1 April for the US and Canada. As with On the 13th Day the band were hosts to their fans at a record launch party held at the Robin 2 in Bilston on 25 March 2014, the day after the UK release. Compared with Magnum's album releases since reformation it was a commercial success reaching number 14 in the German Albums Chart, 19 in the Swedish Albums Chart, 22 in the Switzerland Albums Chart and 38 in the UK Albums Chart, a position last achieved by Magnum with The Eleventh Hour! in 1983. It also reached number two in the UK Rock Albums Chart. The album was followed by a European tour, during which the live album Escape from the Shadow Garden – Live 2014 was recorded. It was released in May 2015.

In February 2016, Magum released the album Sacred Blood "Divine" Lies, 10 brand new tracks forging forward the Magnum sound. With the collaboration once again with Rodney Matthews artwork the release came with bonus videos and bonus tracks. The album was followed by a 33 date tour in Europe, UK and Ireland and then again a winter tour appearing at a few UK and Irish venues. Later that year, Clarkin's daughter suggested a compilation of ballads. Clarkin liked the idea, and after getting a go-ahead from SPV, Magnum got to work with the compilation. This turned out to be a longer process than anticipated. Many songs undertook a lot of treatment to remix, re-master and even re-record complete songs. The new ballads album titled The Valley of Tears – The Ballads was released on 6 January 2017.

=== Line-up changes, Tony Clarkin's death (2017–present) ===
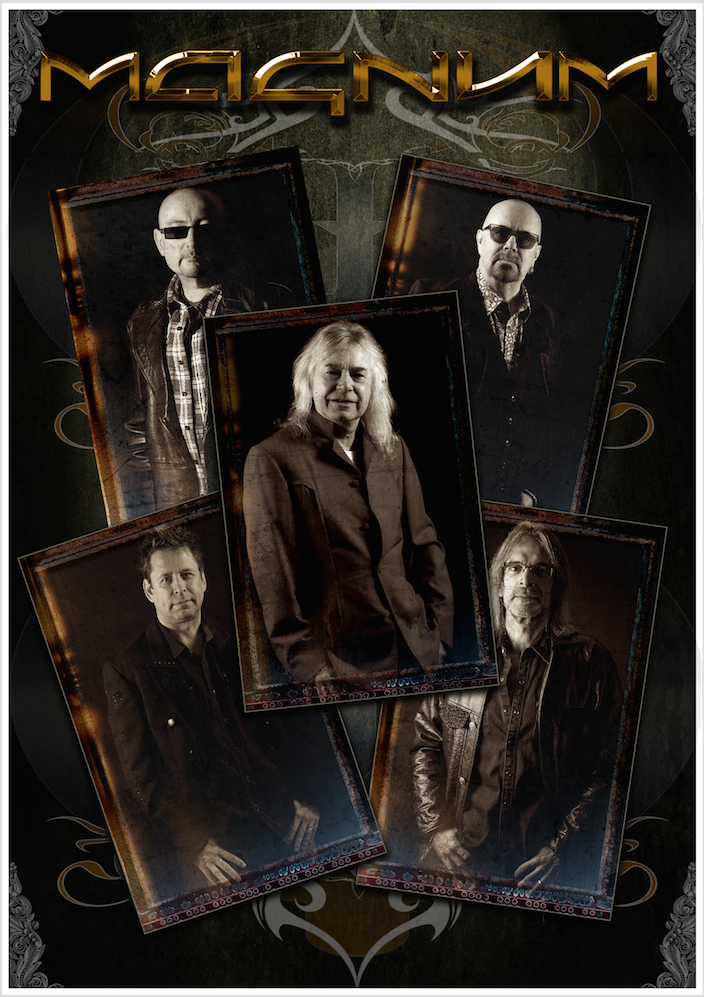
2017 promotional photo

In December 2016, Mark Stanway left the band in the middle of a tour, due to what he called "irrevocable circumstances". He was replaced by West Midlands session musician Rick Benton, who made his first live appearance in Wolverhampton 2016. Benton was officially announced as a permanent member in January 2017. A few months later, due to conflicting schedules, former Paradise Lost drummer Lee Morris replaced Harry James as the band's drummer. With this new line-up, the band started recording their next album in February 2017. Lost on the Road to Eternity was released in January 2018, and the band embarked on a tour, which resulted in the live album Live at the Symphony Hall in January 2019.

On 25 June 2019, bassist Al Barrow announced his departure from the band due to his difficulties in spending much time away from his home in America. Dennis Ward (Pink Cream 69, Unisonic) was announced as the new member. The Serpent Rings, the band's 21st studio album, was released in January 2020. When asked about the future, Clarkin stated that Magnum had another two studio albums signed for with the record label, and that the band has no plan to retire. A tour had been scheduled for the spring, but it had to be postponed because of the COVID-19 pandemic. The band returned to the studio, and a remastered compilation album titled Dance of the Black Tattoo was released in January 2021. Their 22nd studio album, The Monster Roars, was released on 14 January 2022.

On 9 January 2024, Magnum announced on their Facebook page that Clarkin had died peacefully on January 7 surrounded by family following a short illness. The previous month the band revealed that he was diagnosed with a rare spinal condition, which brought about the cancellation of their Spring 2024 tour. Here Comes the Rain, Magnum's 23rd studio album, was released five days after Clarkin's death and achieved chart positions unprecedented in the band's history. Two months after the release, Catley said that he could not carry on without Clarkin and that Magnum would disband.

After spending much of the summer on tour with Avantasia, Catley announced in September that there would be a series of tribute shows for Clarkin in January 2025, titled A Passage in Time, A Tribute to Tony Clarkin. Brendon Riley, Clarkin's former guitar tech, was announced as the band's lead guitarist for the dates. A live recording from December 2022 was released in January 2025 as a live album titled Live At KK's Steel Mill. This is the last official live recording featuring Tony Clarkin. In September 2025, it was announced that the band would release a new studio album in 2026, based on unreleased songs written and performed by Clarkin. The songs had all been curated from the band's archive by Clarkin's daughter Dionne.

On 21 September 2026, drummer Lee Morris announced his resignation from the band.

== Recognition ==
In 1986, Patty Smyth recorded a cover version of Magnum's "Les Morts Dansants" called "Call to Heaven" on her album, Never Enough. In 2021, the Dutch band Leap Day recorded the song "May 5th", which can be seen as a tribute to Magnum. In 2025, German supergroup Avantasia released a new album with the song "Bring On the Night" tributed to the late Tony Clarkin.

== Band members ==
Current members

- Bob Catley – vocals (1972–1995, 2001–present)
- Harry James – drums, percussion (2002–2005, 2007–2017, 2026-present)
- Rick Benton – keyboards (2016–present)
- Dennis Ward – bass guitar, backing vocals (2019–present)
- Brendon Riley – lead guitar, backing vocals (2024–present)

Former members

- Tony Clarkin – lead guitar, vocals (1972–1995, 2001–2024; his death), drums (2001)
- Bob Doyle – bass guitar (1972)
- Kex Gorin – drums, percussion (1972–1984; died 2007)
- Dave Morgan – bass guitar, vocals (1972–1975)
- Richard Bailey – keyboards, flute, vocals (1973–1974, 1976–1980)
- Colin "Wally" Lowe – bass guitar, vocals (1975–1995)
- Mark Stanway – keyboards (1980–1984, 1985–1995, 2001–2016)
- Eddie George – keyboards (1984–1985)
- Jim Simpson – drums, percussion (1984–1985)
- Mickey Barker – drums, percussion (1985–1995)
- Al Barrow – bass guitar, backing vocals (2001–2019)
- Jimmy Copley – drums, percussion (2005–2007; died 2017)
- Lee Morris – drums (2017–2026)

Touring musicians

- Les Kitcheridge – rhythm guitar (1972)
- Grenville Harding – keyboards (1980)
- Robin George – rhythm guitar (1983; died 2024)
- Laurence Archer – lead guitar (1984; filled in for Tony Clarkin)

== Management ==
Following the untimely death of Tony Clarkin, Dionne Clarkin (daughter of the late Tony Clarkin) and her business partner Ed Cutler replaced previous management to continue the legacy of Magnum and Tony Clarkin.

== Discography ==
As Magnum

- Kingdom of Madness (1978)
- Magnum II (1979)
- Chase the Dragon (1982)
- The Eleventh Hour (1983)
- On a Storyteller's Night (1985)
- Vigilante (1986)
- Wings of Heaven (1988)
- Goodnight L.A. (1990)
- Sleepwalking (1992)
- Keeping the Nite Light Burning (1993)
- Rock Art (1994)
- Breath of Life (2002)
- Brand New Morning (2004)
- Princess Alice and the Broken Arrow (2007)
- Into the Valley of the Moonking (2009)
- The Visitation (2011)
- On the 13th Day (2012)
- Escape from the Shadow Garden (2014)
- Sacred Blood "Divine" Lies (2016)
- Lost on the Road to Eternity (2018)
- The Serpent Rings (2020)
- The Monster Roars (2022)
- Here Comes the Rain (2024)

As Hard Rain

- Hard Rain (1997)
- When the Good Times Come (1999)
