= Chase the Dragon =

Studio album by Magnum
- Released: February 1982
- Recorded: 1980
- Studios: Town House Studios, London
- Genre: Hard rock
- Length: 35:19
- Label: Jet
- Producer: Jeff Glixman

Magnum chronology
Marauder (1980)	Chase the Dragon (1982)	The Eleventh Hour (1983)

Singles from Chase the Dragon
- 1. "The Lights Burned Out" Released: February 1982

Professional ratings
Review scores
Source	Rating
AllMusic	3/5 stars
Record Mirror	1/5 stars

Chase the Dragon is the third studio album by English rock band Magnum. It was released in 1982 on Jet Records. Overseen by the Kansas producer Jeff Glixman, Chase the Dragon was the first recorded appearance by the new keyboard player Mark Stanway, although he had made his live debut at Magnum's appearance at the Reading Festival in 1980. The album was recorded over 13 days at Town House Studios in London, and the following year Tony Clarkin flew to Axis Studios in Atlanta to mix it. However, there was a two-year delay before the album's release in 1982. Many of the tracks have remained in Magnum's live set for many years, including "Soldier of the Line", "The Spirit" and "Sacred Hour".

Chase the Dragon was eventually released in February 1982, two years after the recording sessions, reaching the Top 20 in the UK charts, peaking at #17. "The Lights Burned Out" was released as a single, followed by an EP in September 1982 with two new studio songs "Back to Earth" and "Hold Back Your Love" with two live tracks recorded in Nashville, Tennessee, in 1982, whilst supporting Ozzy Osbourne (later released on Invasion Live). It is also noted as the first Magnum album with Rodney Matthews' artwork. The 2005 expanded version of the album was reissued on 22 September 2006 in Japan with mini LP/paper sleeve packaging through Arcangelo. The album was also included in a limited edition Japanese box set, consisting of all six of Sanctuary Records expanded and remastered releases with mini LP/paper sleeve packaging. The set included an outer box showing Magnum's Chase the Dragon artwork.

== Track listing ==
All tracks are written by Tony Clarkin.

Original 1982 release
No.	Title	Length
1.	"Soldier of the Line"	4:16
2.	"On the Edge of the World"	4:23
3.	"The Spirit"	4:18
4.	"Sacred Hour"	5:35
5.	"Walking the Straight Line"	4:53
6.	"We All Play the Game"	4:07
7.	"The Teacher"	3:21
8.	"The Lights Burned Out"	4:29

2005 expanded edition
No.	Title	Length
9.	"Back to Earth" (originally released on the EP Back to Earth 7" single A-side)	3:39
10.	"Hold Back Your Love" (originally released on the EP Back to Earth 7" single B-side)	3:22
11.	"Soldier of the Line" (originally released on the EP Back to Earth 7" single A-side – live version)	3:51
12.	"Sacred Hour" (originally released on the EP Back to Earth 7" single A-side – live version)	5:45
13.	"Long Days, Black Nights" (originally released on the single The Lights Burned Out 7" single B-side)	3:12
14.	"The Lights Burned Out" (Demo recording originally released on Archive)	4:06
15.	"The Spirit" (originally released on Invasion Live)	4:36
16.	"Soldier of the Line" (1993 acoustic recording originally released on Keeping the Nite Light Burning)	3:57

== Cover sleeve ==
The cover art was designed by Rodney Matthews.

"My original brief for Magnum's 'Chase the Dragon' album cover was given by Tony Clarkin, founder member of the band, who writes all the music and lyrics. In the first instance the record was to have been called 'The Spirit' and my rough visuals were prepared with that title in mind. The album, which was intended to be a gatefold sleeve, ended up in a standard container because the record company could not justify the extra expense.

"This was a pity I felt, because I had designed two images to relate to each other and read from front to inside spread. The first being the work 'Chase the Dragon' and the second, 'Sanctuary'. The city depicted in each was appropriated to the title 'The Spirit', but I find it difficult to equate it with the replacement title 'Chase the Dragon' which is a slang term for an oriental practice in drug abuse." – Rodney Matthews

== Reissues ==
Release date	Formats	Label	Catalogue number	Notes
02/82	LP, PD	Jet Records	JETLP235, JETPD235	Rodney Matthews artwork
01/87	CD	Jet Records	JETCD004	
06/88	LP, PD, CD	FM Records	WKFMLP112, WKFMPD112, WKFMXD112	
01/88	CD	Castle Communications	CLACD222	
01/91	CD	Castle Communications	CLACD222	
08/99	CD	Castle Essentials	ESMCD570	Includes bonus tracks
10/05	CD	Sanctuary Records	CMQDD1231	Expanded and remastered with bonus tracks
2020/2021	LP	Renaissance Records US	RDEGLP887	

== Bonus tracks ==
In 2005, Sanctuary Records released a remastered and expanded edition with bonus tracks.

"Back to Earth", "Hold Back Your Love", "Soldier of the Line" and "Sacred Hour" (disc 1, tracks 9–12)
Were released and an EP called "Live in America", with two live tracks recorded in Nashville, Tennessee, in 1982, while supporting Ozzy Osbourne (originally released on Invasion Live) and two new studio tracks recorded during the Chase the Dragon sessions.

"Long Days Black Nights" (disc 1, track 13)
Was the B-side to the single "The Light Burned Out".

"Lights Burned Out" (disc 1, track 14)
This was recorded at Zella Studios in Birmingham in late 1979 and is the original version before a chorus was written. This was intended for the album Chase the Dragon. – Tony Clarkin

Originally released in Jet Records' 1993 compilation Archive.

"The Spirit" (disc 1, track 15)
Recorded in Nashville, Tennessee, in 1982, while supporting Ozzy Osbourne, (originally released on Invasion Live).

"Soldier of the Line" (disc 1, track 16)
Released in 1993 on Magnum's acoustic album Keeping the Nite Light Burning.

== Singles ==
The Lights Burned Out 7" (February 1982)

1. "The Lights Burned Out" [LP version] – 4:32
2. "Long Days Black Nights" [B-side] – 3:11

Live in America 7" (September 1982)

1. "Back to Earth" [A-side] – 3:39
2. "Hold Back Your Love" [A-side] – 3:22

Live in America EP (September 1982)

1. "Back to Earth" [A-side] – 3:39
2. "Hold Back Your Love" [A-side] – 3:22
3. "Soldier of the Line" [live] – 3:51
4. "Sacred Hour" [live] – 5:45

== Personnel ==
- Bob Catley – vocals
- Tony Clarkin – guitar
- Wally Lowe – bass
- Mark Stanway – keyboards
- Kex Gorin – drums

Production

- Produced and engineered by Jeff Glixman; assistant engineer: Steve Prestage
- Recorded at the Town House Studios, London, UK
- Mixed at Axis Sound Studios, Atlanta, Georgia, US

== Related information ==
The song "The Spirit" was covered by the German power metal band Edguy on their 2005 EP Superheroes.

Stian Aarstad, the former pianist of the symphonic black metal band Dimmu Borgir, used the intro to "Sacred Hour" as the intro to the song "Alt Lys er Svunnet Hen" on their album Stormblåst. Aarstad neglected to tell them this. The intro to the song was left out in the re-recording of the album in 2005.

== Charts ==
Chart (1982)	Peak position
UK Albums (Official Charts)	17
