= Tony Clarkin =

British guitarist (1946–2024)

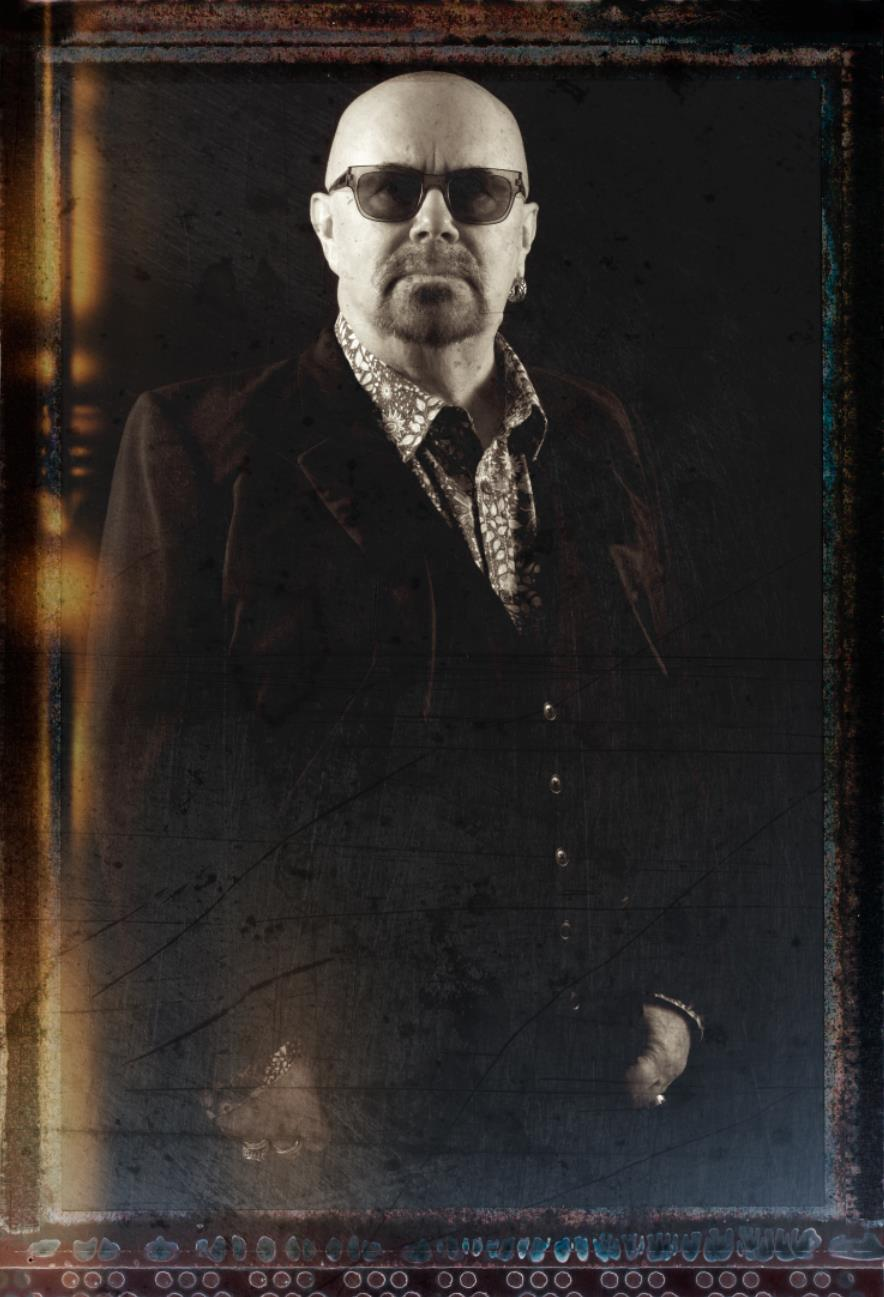

Background information
- Born: Anthony Michael Clarkin; 24 November 1946; Birmingham, England
- Died: 7 January 2024 (aged 77)
- Genres: Hard rock, melodic rock, AOR, progressive rock
- Occupations: Musician, songwriter, record producer
- Instruments: Guitar
- Years active: 1972–2024
- Formerly of: Magnum, Hard Rain
- Website: magnumonline.co.uk

Anthony Michael Clarkin (24 November 1946 – 7 January 2024) was an English musician, best known as the guitarist of the rock band Magnum. He was the sole songwriter throughout Magnum's history, writing all of the material on their 23 studio albums as well as on two studio albums by Magnum spin-off group Hard Rain. He also produced most of Magnum's albums.

== Biography ==
Anthony Michael Clarkin was born and grew up in the Shard End area of Birmingham, which spawned a number of bands tagged with the 'Brum Beat' label. Leaving school to train as a Ladies hairdresser he soon quit to join his first band The Boulevards with former school friends.

=== Magnum (1972–1995) ===
Magnum began as the house band at Birmingham's Rum Runner night club (later the home of Duran Duran) in 1972.

They began to develop their own style by playing Clarkin's songs at a residency at The Railway Inn, in Birmingham's Curzon Street, in 1976. Joining Clarkin and Bob Catley were drummer Kex Gorin and bassist Dave Morgan (later a member of ELO) and Mark Stanway keyboard player joined in 1980 and remained until 2016. Their most notable success during these early years was the Jeff Glixman produced Chase The Dragon (1982) which reached number 17 in the UK Albums Chart, and included several songs that would be mainstays of the band's live set, notably "Soldier of the Line", "Sacred Hour" and "The Spirit".

It was not until the band came into association with manager Keith Baker, their breakthrough album came in 1985 with On a Storyteller's Night which featured the single "Just Like an Arrow". This success continued in the following years when Baker introduced the band to Queen drummer Roger Taylor. He produced Vigilante in 1986, the top 5 album Wings of Heaven in 1988, and the Keith Olsen produced Goodnight L.A. which reached number 9 in the UK Albums Chart in 1990.

In mid 1995, Clarkin announced the band were to split following a farewell tour of the UK and Europe.

=== Hard Rain (1996–2000) ===
After Magnum split, a spin-off group featuring Catley and Clarkin was formed called Hard Rain, and they released the albums Hard Rain and When The Good Times Come. It was around this time that Catley launched a solo career using various songwriters, including Gary Hughes of the band Ten. However, Hard Rain found gigs and booking hard to come by, and there were discussions about renaming the band as Magnum. Also, at this time, Catley was becoming increasingly focused on his solo career, and he quit Hard Rain, marking the end of a working relationship with Clarkin that dated back to 1972. After a quiet period Clarkin announced the end of Hard Rain.

Clarkin commented: "The break since the middle of the Nineties was definitely necessary for me. Since the end of the Seventies, in fact since we embarked on the preparations for our debut recording Kingdom of Madness, not a single month had gone by in which I didn't work for Magnum, composed for the group, or at least thought of them permanently. For almost twenty years, all my thoughts had revolved around the band. I needed a break to clear my head and to be able to devote myself to the band again with renewed energy." – Tony Clarkin, 2002

=== Magnum reunion and death (2001–2024) ===
Eventually, Clarkin and Catley re-launched Magnum with the album Breath of Life in 2002 on SPV. They were again joined by Stanway, with former Hard Rain bassist Al Barrow and former-Thunder drummer Harry James. This was subsequently followed by Brand New Morning in 2004.

Magnum completed work on a new studio album, Princess Alice and the Broken Arrow with drummer Jimmy Copley released on 26 March 2007, that also marked the return of cover artwork by Rodney Matthews. The album entered the UK Albums Chart at number 70, the first time Magnum had charted in the UK since 1994. It also reached number 4 on the BBC Rock Albums Chart and number 60 in Germany, the band's biggest market along with Scandinavia outside of the UK.

On 9 January 2024, Clarkin's family announced that he had died on 7 January. He was 77. The previous month the band revealed that he was diagnosed with a rare spinal condition, which brought about the cancellation of their Spring 2024 tour. Two months after Clarkin's death, Catley announced that he could not carry on without him and that Magnum would retire. However, the band eventually decided to go on a short tour in 2025, paying tribute to Clarkin's legacy as well as presenting the new album.

=== Other projects ===
In 1981, two tracks were written and produced by Clarkin and were sung by Sue McCloskey, a friend of Magnum. They were entitled "Really Need Your Love" and "Lost Inside Myself". After Catley left Hard Rain, Clarkin continued to write material with McCloskey. Some of these songs were broadcast on radio during an interview with Clarkin. Two of these songs surfaced as Magnum songs, "Still" and "Dream About You" on Magnum's 2002 studio album, Breath of Life.

Clarkin played guitar on a Rodney Matthews/Rudi Dobson side project called The House on the Rock.

== Discography ==
=== Hard Rain ===
- Hard Rain (1997)
- When the Good Times Come (1999)
