= Revolver Music =

Record label

Revolver Music was a British record label. It was created by Paul Birch in 1979 as a guitar music label. Its sister labels are FM Records and Heavy Metal Records.

== History ==
Revolver is best known for signing the Manchester band the Stone Roses, who released the "Sally Cinnamon" EP with Revolver under the Black Records imprint prior to reneging on their contract and moving to Silvertone (part of the Zomba Group). The Black Records label was a division of FM-Revolver that was initially created as an indie imprint to promote the Stone Roses, and later used for releases by Crazyhead, the Pleasureheads and the Wild Flowers amongst others.

Revolver also signed artists such as UK Subs and the Vibrators, also releasing the first eponymous album by Jane's Addiction in the UK.

Other artists released on Revolver include:

- Ausgang
- Bruce Cockburn
- Be-Bop Deluxe
- Karen Lawrence
- The Plasmatics
- Francis X and the Bushmen
- Jayne County (a.k.a. Wayne County
- Tyla (From Dogs D'Amour)
- Peat Moss
- 54-40
- Vain
- Tonic
- Norman Connors
- Rose Royce
- Biomechanical
- Babe Ruth Band
- Madisuns
- The OneThree (Alex Lusty and Boz Boorer)
- Greenhaus
- Elucidate

Revolver is distributed by Music Video Distributors in the US and Canada, Plastic Head Distribution throughout the UK and Europe, and Victor Entertainment in Japan.

== FM Records ==
FM Records and Revolver Records were two labels in common ownership that came together to form FM Revolver (also FM-Revolver Records) in the 1980s. The FM label presented itself as FM Records, FM Coast to Coast, FM Dance and FM Revolver.

The label was distributed by BMG Ariola Munich and in the UK by BMG until 1991, from 1991 to 2000 by Sony Music Entertainment, from 2000 to 2009 by Universal Music Group and 2009 onwards by Plastic Head. The FM Label is best known for signing rock acts like Magnum which it established with the 1985 release "On a Storyteller's Night". It released several back catalogue albums belonging to the Jet Records label under license, the compilation album "Mirador" and box set "Foundation".

Other FM artists included Adam Bomb, Asia, Atom Seed, Babe Ruth, Cloven Hoof, Dark Star, Jack Green, James Young, King Kobra, Lisa Dominique, the Macc Lads, Marino, Multi-story, Pet Hate, Rough Trade, Sofia Rotaru, Steve Gaines, Tobruk, Torino, Tradia, UFO, White Sister and Wrathchild. Its Jazz releases notably include Alvin Davis; other signings include Sister Sledge, Cecilia Ray and Val Grant to its FM Dance imprint.

FM Records today continues under the Revolver label.

== Heavy Metal Records ==
Heavy Metal Records is the sister label to Revolver Records. Starting out in 1978, Heavy Metal Records came before Revolver. Revolver Records only came about due to HMR's success, where the label wanted to branch out and explore diverse types of guitar music.

HMR has operated-under the following labels: Heavy Metal Records, Heavy Metal America, Heavy Metal Worldwide.
