= Jet Records =

British record label

- Parent company: BMG Rights Management (back catalogue, except 2 artists); Sony Music Entertainment (ELO and Ozzy Osbourne catalogues)
- Founded: 1974
- Founder: Don Arden
- Status: Defunct
- Distributors: Island Records (1974-75) (UK); Polydor Records (1975-76) (UK); United Artists Records (1976-78) (UK), (1974-78) (US); CBS Records (1978-85); Sanctuary Records (back catalogue except 2 artists); Epic Records (ELO and Ozzy Osbourne catalogues); Cherry Red Records (Lynsey de Paul catalogue)
- Genre: Rock, pop
- Country of origin: United Kingdom
- Location: London, England

Jet Records was a British record label started by Don Arden in 1974, featuring musicians such as Lynsey de Paul, Electric Light Orchestra (ELO), Roy Wood, Gary Moore, Ozzy Osbourne, Alan Price, Adrian Gurvitz, Riot, Magnum and Trickster.

== History ==
The first release on the Jet Records label was the single "No, Honestly" which was a UK top 10 for its singer and writer Lynsey de Paul in November 1974. It was followed by the de Paul album, Taste Me... Don't Waste Me. De Paul wrote the second single on the Jet label, a song called "My One and Only" recorded by the British female vocal group, Bones. The fourth single released on the label, "My Man and Me", was written and performed by de Paul and it was the second UK hit single released on Jet Records. De Paul released a second album entitled Love Bomb, before leaving the label in 1976 after an acrimonious split with Arden, resulting in her third Jet album Take Your Time (originally entitled Before You Go Tonight) being unreleased.

ELO were managed by Arden from the band's inception in 1972. They were initially signed to Harvest Records (a division of EMI) in the UK and United Artists Records in the US. Roy Wood left ELO in 1972 and formed his own group, Wizzard. During 1973 and 1974, ELO and Wizzard moved from the Harvest label to Warner Bros. Records in the UK. In 1975, the two bands and Wood's solo releases moved again in the UK to Jet, with their recent Warner Bros. material becoming part of Jet's catalogue. David Carradine's solo album Grasshopper had the collaboration of ELO's cellist Hugh McDowell and violinist Mik Kaminski.

In the UK, Jet Records were distributed first by Island Records in 1974-75, then by Polydor Records from 1975 to 1976, then by United Artists from 1976 to 1978. In the US, a small Jet logo started appearing on the United Artists label in 1975 for releases by ELO and Wood. The Jet label was first used in the US for Jeff Lynne's solo single "Doin' That Crazy Thing" in the summer of 1977 and subsequently for the ELO album Out of the Blue.

Wood left Jet Records and disbanded Wizzard in 1976, after Jet refused to release Wizzard's third album Wizzo, because it was not deemed commercial enough. His final single on the Jet label was "Any Old Time Will Do".

After Jet's UK distribution moved to United Artists (UA) in 1976, UA were distributing Jet Records in most countries of the world. This changed after American copies of Out of the Blue that were deemed defective, began appearing at discounted prices in record shops in the US and Canada affecting the album's sales. Jet sued UA and abruptly switched their distribution to CBS Records worldwide early in 1978.

By this time, ELO had become one of the most popular bands in the world, and Jet reissued ELO's back catalogue albums and some new singles in many different colours of vinyl. Many members of ELO also released solo albums or singles on Jet in the late 1970s. In 1980, ELO contributed half the music to the motion picture Xanadu, with the other half of the music being provided by the film's star Olivia Newton-John. Newton-John was signed to MCA Records whose sister company Universal was producing the movie. The Xanadu soundtrack and all its singles by both ELO and Newton-John were released on MCA Records in the US and Canada, and on Jet Records elsewhere in the world.

Black Sabbath were also managed by Don Arden, but they were never signed to Jet Records. However, when their singer Ozzy Osbourne left the band, he was signed to Jet. Two studio albums and one live album by Osbourne were released on Jet. Arden's daughter Sharon, who was working for her father, started dating Osbourne and eventually married him. Sharon took over managing Osbourne from her father, and Osbourne left Jet to go to the Epic label of Jet's distributor CBS.

Osbourne's defection along with ELO becoming less popular in the early 1980s contributed to Jet experiencing financial difficulties. Legal problems encountered by Don Arden, and his son David, further strained Jet's resources. ELO's recording contract and back catalogue were sold by Jet to CBS in 1985. Initial copies of ELO's 1986 album Balance of Power were pressed on the Jet label in some European countries as well as a small handful of other countries, but this mistake was corrected by CBS, and the album was then issued throughout Europe on its Epic label. American reissues by CBS of ELO's 1972 to 1983 albums continued to show the Jet logo until 1990. ELO's back catalog is now handled by Sony's Legacy Recordings (except the Harvest albums, handled by Warner Music Group under the Parlophone label).

Jet carried on in a diminished capacity in the late 1980s. Roy Wood returned to the label in 1987 to release the single "1-2-3". Just before closure, the label released Live at Fairfield Halls by Bucks Fizz, a group the label had previously had no connection with.

1989 saw the final Jet release under CBS distribution, with the Dan Priest produced LP/CD Bite the Bullet by BTB (US CD: JET ZK 44410; UK LP: JET 465089-1).

In 1991, Bagdasarian Productions (owners of the Chipmunks) bought the production company offices and holdings from Arden, and reopened the record label Jet Records under the new name Chipmunk Records.

In 1996, Jet released the Fall's album The Light User Syndrome and the single "The Chiselers".

Some of Jet's back catalogue has appeared in reissues or compilations in the 1990s and 2000s, on labels such as Edsel Records and Sanctuary Records, including the previously unreleased third Wizzard album, retitled Main Street. The third album that Lynsey de Paul recorded for Jet in 1976, the unreleased Take Your Time finally appeared on CD in Japan with the title Before You Go Tonight on the Vivid Sound Corporation label in 1990. De Paul finally recovered the rights to her songs recorded for Jet Records and many of them were released on her 2013 anthology albums Sugar and Beyond and Into My Music.

As of 2020, most of Jet's catalogue is owned by BMG Rights Management under its Sanctuary label.

== See also ==
- List of record labels
