= X/The Name of the Rose =

Compilation album by Ten
- Released: November 22, 1999
- Genre: Pop/Rock
- Length: 2:36:39
- Label: Frontiers Records; FR CD 039
- Producer: Gary Hughes

Ten chronology
Spellbound (1999)	X/The Name of the Rose (1999)	Babylon (2000)

Ten compilation chronology
The Best of Ten 1996-1999 (1999)	X/The Name of the Rose (1999)	The Robe/Bonus Collection (1999)

X/The Name of the Rose is a compilation album released by the hard rock band Ten. The double compact disc contains the debut Ten studio album X originally released in 1996 and the band's second album The Name of the Rose, along with a number of bonus tracks, which were only available on the band's Japanese exclusive EP, The Name of the Rose.

== Track listing ==
All songs written by Gary Hughes except where noted.

=== Disc one-X ===
1. The Crusades/It's All About Love" – 8:07 (Hughes/Vinny Burns)
2. After the Love Has Gone" – 5:27
3. Yesterday Lies in the Flames" – 5:06
4. The Torch" – 5:25
5. Stay With Me" – 5:52
6. Close Your Eyes and Dream" – 6:24
7. Eyes of a Child" – 5:02
8. Can't Slow Down" – 5:29
9. Lamb to the Slaughter" – 4:50
10. Soliloquy/The Loneliest Place in the World" – 10:28
11. When Only Love Can Ease the Pain" – 5:07
12. After the Love Has Gone" (Live version) – 5:21
13. Can't Slow Down" (Live version) – 6:17

=== Disc two-"The Name Of The Rose" ===
1. The Name of the Rose" – 8:31
2. Wildest Dreams" – 5:33
3. Don't Cry" – 5:00
4. Turn Around" – 3:52
5. Pharaoh's Prelude: Ascension to the Afterlife" – 3:54
6. Wait For You" – 5:31
7. The Rainbow" – 6:03 (G. Hughes/Zoe Hughes)
8. Through the Fire" – 8:19
9. Goodnight Saigon" – 7:02
10. Wings of the Storm" – 5:02
11. Standing In Your Light" – 7:18
12. The Quest" – 4:52
13. You're My Religion" – 6:48

== Personnel ==
=== X ===
- Gary Hughes – vocals and programming
- Vinny Burns – guitars and programming
- Greg Morgan – drums and percussion
- Mark Harrison – bass guitar
- Lee Goulding – keyboards
- Howard Smith – keyboards
- Andy Thompson – keyboards
- Francis Cummings – first violin
- Peter Leighton-Jones – first violin
- John Wade – first violin
- Fiona Payne – second violin
- Julia Parsons – second violin
- Jean Ambrose – viola
- Anne Morrison – viola
- Anna Frazer – cello

=== The Name of the Rose ===
- Gary Hughes – vocals and programming
- Vinny Burns – guitars and programming
- Ged Rylands – keyboards
- Martin "Shelley" Shelton – bass guitar
- Greg Morgan – drums and percussion
- Mark Harrison – bass guitar
- Brian Cox – keyboards
- Howard Smith – keyboards
- Andy Thompson – keyboards
- Jason Thanos – backing vocals (Track 9)
- Oliver Bowden – backing vocals (Track 11)
- Thierey Cardinet – backing vocals (Track 11)
- Damien Guasp – backing vocals (Track 11)
- Jee Jacquet – backing vocals (Track 11)

== Production ==
- Mixing – Mike Stone
- Engineer – Mike Stone, Audu Obaje and Ray Brophy
- Executive Producers – Mark Ashton and Vinny Burns
