= Battlefield – The Rocktopia Records Collection =

Compilation album by Ten
- Released: June 17, 2016
- Recorded: 2014–2015
- Genre: Hard rock
- Length: 133:04
- Label: Rocktopia Records; 006RTP
- Producer: Gary Hughes

Ten chronology
Isla De Muerta (2015)	Battlefield – The Rocktopia Records Collection (2016)

Battlefield – The Rocktopia Records Collection is the fifth compilation album released by English melodic hard rock band Ten, which consists of tracks from all the Rocktopia Records releases, namely Albion, Isla De Muerta and The Dragon And Saint George EP.

As with the last three releases, the collection's cover was illustrated by Gaetano Di Falco, who also illustrated the band's three aforementioned releases. The release was strictly limited to 500 copies.

== Track listing ==
All songs written by Gary Hughes except where noted.

=== Disc One – Albion ===
All songs written by Gary Hughes.

1. Alone in the Dark Tonight – 4:25
2. Battlefield – 5:00
3. It's Alive – 5:02
4. Albion Born – 5:24
5. Sometimes Love Takes The Long Way Home – 5:14
6. A Smuggler's Tale – 5:57
7. It Ends This Day – 5:37
8. Die For Me – 7:28
9. Gioco D'Amore – 4:59
10. Wild Horses – 5:55
11. Good God in Heaven What Hell Is This – 4:00 (Japanese Version Bonus Track)
12. The Prodigal Saviour – 4:12 (Exclusive The Dragon And Saint George EP Track)
13. Is There Anyone With Sense – 5:15 (Exclusive The Dragon And Saint George EP Track)

=== Disc Two – Isla De Muerta ===
1. (i) Buccaneers (Instrumental) / (ii) Dead Men Tell No Tales – 6:27
2. Tell Me What To Do – 4:15
3. Acquiesce – 4:45
4. This Love – 4:42
5. The Dragon And Saint George – 5:16
6. Intensify – 6:39
7. (i) Karnak (Instrumental) / (ii) The Valley of the Kings – 8:10
8. Revolution – 5:56
9. Musketeers: Soldiers Of The King – 4:07 (Exclusive The Dragon And Saint George EP Track)
10. Angel Of Darkness – 3:57
11. The Last Pretender – 6:40
12. We Can Be As One – 3:28
13. Assault And Battery – 4:52 (Japanese Version Bonus Track)

== Personnel ==
- Gary Hughes – vocals, guitars, backing vocals
- Dann Rosingana – lead guitars
- Steve Grocott – lead guitars
- John Halliwell – rhythm Guitars
- Darrel Treece-Birch – keyboards, programming
- Steve Mckenna – bass guitar
- Max Yates – drums and percussion

== Production ==
- Produced by Gary Hughes
- Mixing and mastering by Dennis Ward
