= The Robe/Bonus Collection =

Compilation album by Ten
- Released: November 22, 1999
- Genre: Hard rock
- Length: 119:32
- Labels: Frontiers Records; FR CD 040
- Producer: Gary Hughes

Ten chronology
Spellbound (1999)	The Robe/Bonus Collection (1999)	Babylon (2000)

Ten compilation chronology
Ten/The Name of the Rose (1999)	The Robe/Bonus Collection (1999)	The Best of Ten 1996-1999 (1999)

The Robe/Bonus Collection is a compilation album released by English hard rock band Ten. The double compact disc contains the third Ten studio album plus a separate disc of tracks previously released only in Japan.

== Track listing ==
All songs written by Gary Hughes except where noted.

=== Disc one-The Robe ===
1. "The Robe" – 9:05
2. "Bright On the Blade" – 4:50
3. "Standing On the Edge of Time" – 5:01 (Hughes/Vinny Burns)
4. "Virtual Reality" – 5:48
5. "Arcadia" – 7:34
6. "Battlelines" – 4:17
7. "You're In My Heart" – 6:38
8. "Fly Like an Eagle" – 7:12
9. "Ten Fathoms Deep" – 7:09
10. "Someday" – 7:58 (Hughes/Burns)

=== Disc two-Bonus Collection ===
1. "Warpath" – 3:51
2. "Venus and Mars" – 4:34
3. "Give Me a Piece of Your Heart" – 5:41 (Hughes/Burns)
4. "If Only For a Day" – 8:11
5. "Black Moon Rising" – 4:03
6. "To Die For" – 4:33 (Hughes/Burns)
7. "Close Your Eyes and Dream" (Live acoustic version) – 2:02
8. "Turn Around" (Live acoustic version) – 1:37
9. "Xanadu" – 4:55 (Hughes/Burns)
10. "Rainbow In the Dark" – 4:52
11. "We Rule the Night" (Acoustic version) – 5:18
12. "Red" (Acoustic version) – 4:16
13. "Till the End of Time" (Acoustic version) – 3:47

== Personnel ==
- Gary Hughes – vocals and programming
- Vinny Burns – guitars and programming
- Ged Rylands – keyboards
- Greg Morgan – drums and percussion
- John Halliwell – guitars
- Andrew Webb – bass guitar
- Jason Thanos – backing vocals
- Ray Brophy – backing vocals and programming
- Ed Collins – trumpet and flugelhorn
- Dru Baker – tenor and alto saxophone
- Dave Chadwick – Voiceovers

== Production ==
- Mixing – Mike Stone
- Engineer – Ray Brophy
- Additional Engineering – Audu Obaje, Tim Baxter and Royston Hollyer
