= The Robe (EP) =

EP by Ten
- Released: September 18, 1997
- Genre: Hard rock
- Length: 25:11
- Label: Zero Corporation; XRCN-2008
- Producer: Gary Hughes

Ten chronology
The Robe (1997)	The Robe (1997)	Spellbound (1999)

Ten EP chronology
The Name of the Rose (1996)	The Robe (1997)	You're in My Heart (1997)

The Robe is the second EP released by English melodic hard rock band Ten. The compact disc was officially released only in Asian markets. It was released on September 18, 1997.

== Track listing ==
All songs written by Gary Hughes except where noted.

1. "The Robe" (EP version) – 6:15
2. "Warpath" – 3:50
3. "Venus and Mars" – 4:35
4. "Give Me a Piece of Your Heart" – 5:42 (Hughes/Vinny Burns)
5. "The Robe" (Karaoke version) – 5:31
- All tracks were previously unreleased.
- Tracks 1 and 5, original version on the album The Robe.

== Personnel ==
- Gary Hughes – vocals
- Vinny Burns – Lead guitars
- John Halliwell – Rhythm guitars
- Ged Rylands – keyboards
- Greg Morgan – drums

== Production ==
- Mixing – Mike Stone
- Engineer – Ray Brophy
- Drums recorded by Mike Stone

== See also ==
- The Robe novel and movie
