= In Your Eyes (EP) =

In Your Eyes EP

EP by Gary Hughes
- Released: 1998
- Genre: Melodic hard rock, hard rock
- Length: 26:33
- Label: Zero Corporation; XRCN-2014
- Producer: Gary Hughes,

Gary Hughes chronology
Precious Ones (1998)	In Your Eyes EP (1998)	Once and Future King Part I (2003)

Gary Hughes compilation chronology
The Reissues (2000)	Decades (2021)

In Your Eyes is the first solo EP released by singer-songwriter Gary Hughes from melodic hard rock band Ten. Gary Hughes' third solo album Precious Ones, is the album from which the EP is derived from. The compact disc was officially released only in Asian markets.

== Track listing ==
All songs written and arranged by Gary Hughes.

1. "In Your Eyes" (EP Version) – 5:30
2. "The Miracle Is You" (For EP Only) – 6:34
3. "Be My Fantasy Tonight" (For EP Only) – 6:09
4. "All Fall Down" (For EP Only) – 2:50
5. "In Your Eyes" (Karaoke version) – 5:30
- All tracks were previously unreleased.
- Track 1, original version on the album Precious Ones.

== Personnel ==
- Gary Hughes – vocals, guitars, keyboards and Bass guitars
- Vinny Burns – guitars
- Greg Morgan – drums
- Andy Thompson – keyboards
- Ralph Santolla – guitars
- Aziz Ibrahim – guitars
- Jason Thanos – backing vocals
- Todd Plant – backing vocals
- Mark Ashton – backing vocals
- Ray Brophy – backing vocals

== Production ==
- Producer – Gary Hughes
- Mixing – Ray Brophy
- Engineering – Ray Brophy
- Additional Engineering – Neil Amison (Startrack) and Tim (Gracieland)
- Mastered – John Blamire
