= Opera Omnia (Ten album) =

Opera Omnia: The Complete Works

Compilation album by Ten
- Released: April 26, 2019
- Recorded: 1995–2018
- Genre: Melodic Hard rock, Hard rock
- Length: 1080:55
- Label: Frontiers Records
- Producer: Gary Hughes

Ten chronology
Illuminati (2019)	Opera Omnia: The Complete Works (2019)	Here Be Monsters (2022)

Opera Omnia: The Complete Works is the sixth compilation box set released by the melodic hard rock band Ten which consists of all the albums released by the band, from its inception back in 1995, to the band's latest release Illuminati. The Box-set was released on April 26, 2019, via Frontiers Records.

== Track listing ==
All songs written by Gary Hughes except where noted.

=== Disc one-X ===
1. The Crusades/It's All About Love" – 8:07 (Hughes/Vinny Burns)
2. After the Love Has Gone" – 5:27
3. Yesterday Lies in the Flames" – 5:06
4. The Torch" – 5:25
5. Stay With Me" – 5:52
6. Close Your Eyes and Dream" – 6:24
7. Eyes of a Child" – 5:02
8. Can't Slow Down" – 5:29
9. Lamb to the Slaughter" – 4:50
10. Soliloquy/The Loneliest Place in the World" – 10:28
11. When Only Love Can Ease the Pain" – 5:07
12. After the Love Has Gone" (Live version) – 5:21
13. Can't Slow Down" (Live version) – 6:17

=== Disc two-"The Name of the Rose" ===
1. The Name of the Rose" – 8:31
2. Wildest Dreams" – 5:33
3. Don't Cry" – 5:00
4. Turn Around" – 3:52
5. Pharaoh's Prelude: Ascension to the Afterlife" – 3:54
6. Wait For You" – 5:31
7. The Rainbow" – 6:03 (G. Hughes/Zoe Hughes)
8. Through the Fire" – 8:19
9. Goodnight Saigon" – 7:02
10. Wings of the Storm" – 5:02
11. Standing In Your Light" – 7:18
12. The Quest" – 4:52
13. You're My Religion" – 6:48

=== Disc three-"The Robe" ===
1. The Robe – 9:05
2. Bright On the Blade – 4:50
3. Standing On the Edge of Time – 5:01 (Hughes/Vinny Burns)
4. Virtual Reality – 5:48
5. Arcadia – 7:34
6. Battlelines – 4:17
7. You're in My Heart – 6:38
8. Fly Like an Eagle – 7:12
9. Ten Fathoms Deep – 7:09
10. Someday – 7:58 (Hughes/Burns)
11. Warpath – 3:51
12. To Die For – 4:33 (Hughes/Burns)
13. Close Your Eyes and Dream (Live acoustic version) – 2:02
14. Turn Around (Live acoustic version) – 1:37

=== Disc four-"Never Say Goodbye" ===
1. The Robe – 9:12
2. Bright on the Blade – 4:52
3. Wildest Dreams – 5:24
4. The Torch – 5:47
5. Yesterday Lies in the Flames – 5:23
6. The Rainbow – 6:29 (G. Hughes/Zoe Hughes)
7. The Crusades (Instrumental) – 1:55 (Hughes/Vinny Burns)
8. Don't Cry – 6:13
9. Goodnight Saigon – 6:58
10. Arcadia – 7:45
11. You're in My Heart – 3:59
12. The Loneliest Place in the World – 11:28

=== Disc five-"Never Say Goodbye" ===
1. Ten Fathoms Deep – 7:09
2. After the Love Has Gone – 5:19
3. Stay With Me – 5:20
4. Standing on the Edge of Time – 5:09 (Hughes/Burns)
5. Fly Like an Eagle – 7:39
6. Drum Solo (Instrumental) – 1:18
7. Battlelines – 4:30
8. The Pharaoh's Prelude: Ascension to the Afterlife – 3:54
9. Wait for You – 6:08
10. The Name of the Rose – 9:16
11. Black Moon Rising (Studio version) – 4:05
12. Venus and Mars (Studio version) – 4:34
13. If Only for a Day (Studio version) – 8:13
14. Give Me a Piece of Your Heart (Studio version) – 5:42 (Hughes/Burns)

=== Disc six-"Spellbound" ===
1. March of the Argonauts (Instrumental) – 2:14
2. Fear the Force – 5:36
3. Inside the Pyramid of Light – 4:17 (Hughes/Vinny Burns)
4. Spellbound – 5:15
5. We Rule the Night – 5:29
6. Remembrance for the Brave (Instrumental) – 1:18
7. Red – 4:15
8. The Alchemist – 5:09
9. Wonderland – 5:01
10. Eclipse – 4:14
11. The Phantom – 6:15
12. Till the End of Time – 4:58
13. Xanadu – 4:55 (Hughes/Burns)
14. Rainbow in the Dark – 4:52
15. We Rule the Night (Acoustic version) – 5:18
16. Red (Acoustic version) – 4:16
17. Till the End of Time (Acoustic version) – 3:47

=== Disc seven-"Babylon" ===
1. The Stranger – 7:20
2. Barricade – 5:22
3. Give in This Time – 5:24
4. Dawn Star – 6:07
5. Love Became The Law – 4:41
6. The Heat – 5:41
7. Silent Rain – 6:27
8. Timeless – 4:54
9. Black Hearted Woman – 5:35
10. Thunder in Heaven – 6:58
11. Valentine – 6:14

=== Disc-eight-"Far Beyond The World" ===
1. Glimmer Of Evil – 5:48
2. Strange Land – 5:13
3. High Tide – 5:46
4. What About Me – 5:34
5. Last of the Lovers – 6:11
6. Outlawed And Notorious – 6:37
7. Scarlet and the Grey – 5:29
8. Heart Like A Lion – 5:16
9. Black Shadows – 5:29
10. Who Do You Want To Love – 5:44
11. Far Beyond The World – 5:09
12. The Soldier – 6:11

=== Disc nine-"Return To Evermore" ===
1. Apparition – 8:34
2. Dreamtide – 6:29
3. Evermore – 4:37
4. Sail Away – 5:12
5. Temple of Love – 4:46
6. Even the Ghosts Cry – 5:52
7. Strangers in the Night – 5:19
8. Evil's on Top in the World – 4:31
9. The One – 5:33
10. Lost Soul – 5:29
11. Stay a While – 4:42
12. Tearing My Heart Out – 5:42
13. It's You I Adore – 3:38

=== Disc ten-"The Twilight Chronicles" ===
1. The Prologue (The Elysian Fields)/Rome – 12:19
2. The Chronicles – 6:43
3. The Elysian Fields – 6:49
4. Hallowed Ground – 7:39
5. This Heart Goes On – 4:24
6. Oblivion – 7:03
7. The Twilight Masquerade – 6:38
8. Tourniquet – 6:49
9. Born to the Grave – 5:00
10. When This Night Is Done/The Epilogue – 7:36
11. Fahrenheit – 5:54

=== Disc eleven-"Stormwarning" ===
1. Endless Symphony – 7:26
2. Centre of My Universe – 6:07
3. Kingdom Come – 5:35
4. Book of Secrets – 5:18
5. Stormwarning – 5:39
6. Invisible – 5:38
7. Love Song – 7:07
8. The Hourglass and the Landslide – 4:49
9. Destiny – 6:13
10. The Wave – 5:32
11. The Darkness – 4:19

=== Disc twelve-"Heresy And Creed" ===
1. The Gates Of Jerusalem (Instrumental) – 1:34
2. Arabian Knights – 6:26
3. Gunrunning – 5:52
4. The Lights Go Down – 6:12
5. Raven's Eye – 5:43
6. Right Now – 5:27
7. Game Of Hearts – 4:20
8. The Last Time – 6:36
9. The Priestess – 5:13
10. Insatiable – 4:06
11. Another Rainy Day – 4:57
12. Unbelievable – 4:07
13. The Riddle – 5:32
14. I Found Love – 3:02

=== Disc thirteen-"Albion" ===
1. Alone in the Dark Tonight – 4:25
2. Battlefield – 5:00
3. It's Alive – 5:02
4. Albion Born – 5:24
5. Sometimes Love Takes The Long Way Home – 5:14
6. A Smuggler's Tale – 5:57
7. It Ends This Day – 5:37
8. Die For Me – 7:28
9. Gioco D'Amore – 4:59
10. Wild Horses – 5:55
11. Good God in Heaven What Hell Is This – 4:00

=== Disc fourteen-"Isla De Muerta" ===
1. (i) Buccaneers (Instrumental) / (ii) Dead Men Tell No Tales – 6:27
2. Tell Me What To Do – 4:15
3. Acquiesce – 4:45
4. This Love – 4:42
5. The Dragon And Saint George – 5:16
6. Intensify – 6:39
7. (i) Karnak (Instrumental) / (ii) The Valley of the Kings – 8:10
8. Revolution – 5:56
9. Musketeers: Soldiers Of The King – 4:07 (Exclusive The Dragon And Saint George EP Track)
10. Angel Of Darkness – 3:57
11. The Last Pretender – 6:40
12. Assault And Battery – 4:52 (Japanese Version Bonus Track)
13. We Can Be As One – 3:28
14. Musketeers: Soldiers Of The King – 4:07
15. Is There Anyone With Sense – 5:15
16. The Prodigal Saviour – 4:12

=== Disc fifteen-"Gothica" ===
1. The Grail – 8:06
2. Jekyll and Hyde – 4:41
3. Travellers – 5:11
4. A Man for All Seasons – 7:00
5. In My Dreams – 5:08
6. Wild King of Winter – 6:13
7. Paragon – 4:50
8. Welcome to the Freak Show – 5:35
9. La Luna Dra-Cu-La – 5:31
10. Into Darkness – 5:42

=== Disc sixteen-"Illuminati" ===
1. Be As You Are Forever – 8:04
2. Shield Wall – 5:39
3. The Esoteric Ocean – 5:05
4. Jericho – 5:47
5. Rosetta Stone – 6:14
6. Illuminati – 5:42
7. Heaven And The Hollier-Than-Thou – 5:28
8. Exile – 5:16
9. Mephistopheles – 5:13
10. Of Battles Lost And Won – 5:45

== Personnel ==
- Gary Hughes – vocals, guitars, backing vocals
- John Halliwell – rhythm Guitars
- Neil Fraser – Guitars
- Dan Mitchel – Guitars
- Dann Rosingana – Guitars
- Steve Grocott – Guitars
- Chris Francis – Guitars
- Vinny Burns – Guitars
- Darrel Treece-Birch – keyboards, programming
- Paul Hodson – Keyboards And Synthesizers
- Ged Rylands – Keyboards
- Don Airey – Keyboards
- Mark Sumner – Bass
- Steve Mckenna – Bass
- Frank Basile – drums and percussion
- Greg Morgan – drums and percussion
- Mark Zonder – drums and percussion
- Max Yates – drums and percussion

== Production ==
- Produced by Gary Hughes
- Mixing and mastering by Dennis Ward
- Executive Producers – Mark Ashton and Vinny Burns
- Mixing – Mike Stone
- Engineer – Mike Stone, Audu Obaje, Ray Brophy, Gavin Fernie and Kirk Podmore
- Executive Producers – Mark Ashton and Vinny Burns
- Mixing – Mike Stone
- Engineer – Mike Stone, Audu Obaje and Ray Brophy
- Mixing – Mike Stone
- Engineer – Ray Brophy
- Additional Engineering – Audu Obaje, Tim Baxter and Royston Hollyer
- Mixing – Ray Brophy
- Engineer – Ray Brophy
- Mixing – Rafe McKenna
- Assistant Mixing – Audu Obaje and Dan Sprigg
- Engineers – Audu Obaje
- Assistant Engineer – Neil Amison
- Mixing – Audu Obaje
- Engineers – Audu Obaje, Neil Amison, Kirk Podmore, Vinny Burns and Gary Hughes
- Mixing – Tommy Newton
- Engineer – Paulo Melo
- Additional engineering – Audu Obaje, Ray Brophy, Vinny Burns and Gary Hughes
- Mixing – Pete Coleman
- Engineers – Gary Hughes, Roger Smith and Jason Thanos
- Additional engineering – Pete Coleman, Billy Churchill and Mark Sumner
- Executive producers – Chris Francis and John Halliwell
- Mixing – Gary Hughes
- Engineer – Gary Hughes, Chris Francis, Paul Hodson and Frank Basile
- Additional engineering – Simon Brayshaw, Jason Hutton, Roger Smith and Annette Stelfox
- Drums recorded by Frank Basile then "Gogged Up" by Chris Francis.
