= You're in My Heart (EP) =

You're In My Heart

EP by Ten
- Released: November 12, 1997
- Genre: Hard rock
- Length: 27:58
- Labels: Zero Corporation; XRCN-2015
- Producer: Gary Hughes

Ten chronology
The Robe (1997)	You're In My Heart (1997)	Spellbound (1999)

Ten EP chronology
The Robe (1997)	You're In My Heart (1997)	Fear the Force (1999)

You're In My Heart is the third EP released by English melodic hard rock band Ten. The compact disc was officially released only in Asian markets.

== Track listing ==
All songs written by Gary Hughes except where noted.

1. "You're In My Heart" (EP version) – 5:33
2. "If Only For A Day" – 8:13
3. "Black Moon Rising" – 4:06
4. "To Die For" – 4:34 (Hughes/Vinny Burns)
5. "You're In My Heart" (Karaoke version) – 5:32
- All tracks were previously unreleased.
- Tracks 1 and 5, original version on the album The Robe.

== Personnel ==
- Gary Hughes – vocals
- Vinny Burns – Lead guitars
- John Halliwell – Rhythm guitars
- Ged Rylands – keyboards
- Greg Morgan – drums

== Production ==
- Mixing – Mike Stone
- Engineer – Ray Brophy
- Drums recorded by Mike Stone
