= Dead Men Tell No Tales =

Dead Men Tell No Tales may refer to:

== Books and literature ==
- Dead Men Tell No Tales, an 1898 novel by E. W. Hornung
- Dead Men Tell No Tales, a 2005 comic book series published by Arcana Studio

== Film ==
- Dead Men Tell No Tales, 1914 short film directed by F. Martin Thornton
- Dead Men Tell No Tales (1920 film), a 1920 film directed by Tom Terriss, based on the Hornung novel
- Dead Men Tell No Tales (1938 film), a 1938 British thriller film
- Pirates of the Caribbean: Dead Men Tell No Tales, a 2017 film

== TV ==
- Dead Men Tell No Tales, a 1971 TV film by Walter Grauman
- "Dead Men Tell No Tales", a 1990 episode of Zorro
- "Dead Men Tell Tales", a 2003 episode of The Dead Zone
- "Dead Men Tell No Tales", 2015 episode of Sleepy Hollow

== Miscellaneous ==
- A quote from the Disney attraction "Pirates of the Caribbean"

== Music ==
- "Dead Men Tell No Tales", 1979 song by Motörhead from Bomber
- "Dead Men Tell No Tales", 2006 song by Set Your Goals from Mutiny!
- "Dead Men Tell No Tales", 2015 song by Ten from Isla De Muerta
- "Dead Men Tell No Tales", 1977 song by Slade from Whatever Happened to Slade

== See also ==
- Dead Men Do Tell Tales (disambiguation)
