= Burns Blue =

British hard rock band

Burns Blue are a British hard rock group formed by former Ultravox singer Sam Blue and former Dare/Ten guitarist Vinny Burns. Joining the project was FM drummer Pete Jupp and Wishbone Ash bassist Bob Skeat. Blue and Burns had first worked together when they were both in Ultravox. Blue has also performed on Burns' solo album The Journey.

== Discography ==
What If...

Studio album by Burns Blue
- Released: 2003
- Genre: Hard rock
- Length: 53:23
- Label: Frontiers Records; FR CD 153
- Producer: Vinny Burns

=== What If... (2003) ===
==== Track listing ====
All songs written by Sam Blue/Vinny Burns.

1. "Cool Me Down" – 5:12
2. "Straight" – 3:56
3. "Deadly Sin" – 4:02
4. "Don't Wanna Know" – 3:32
5. "Lover's Game" – 5:25
6. "I'm Gonna Win" – 4:57
7. "Crazy" – 4:07
8. "She Wrote" – 5:03
9. "Tomorrow Never Comes" – 5:13
10. "To One Side" – 3:33
11. "Hung Out to Dry" – 3:17
12. "Where Are You Now" – 5:06

==== Personnel ====
- Vinny Burns – guitars and keyboards
- Sam Blue – vocals
- Bob Skeat – bass guitar
- Pete Jupp – drums
- Tom Kelly – saxophone

==== Production ====
- Mixing – Pete Coleman
- Engineer – Pete Coleman
