= Fear the Force =

EP by Ten
- Released: October 6, 1999
- Genre: Hard rock
- Length: 28:43
- Label: Mercury Records; PHCR-3082
- Producer: Gary Hughes

Ten chronology
The Robe (1997)	Fear the Force (1999)	Spellbound (1999)

Ten EP chronology
You're In My Heart (1997)	Fear the Force (1999)	The Dragon And Saint George (2015)

Fear the Force is the fourth EP released by English melodic hard rock band Ten. The compact disc was officially released only in Japan.

== Track listing ==
All songs written by Gary Hughes except where noted.

1. "Fear the Force" – 5:37
2. "Xanadu" – 4:55 (Hughes/Vinny Burns)
3. "Rainbow In the Dark" – 4:51
4. "We Rule the Night" (Acoustic version) – 5:18
5. "Red" (Acoustic version) – 4:15
6. "Till the End of Time" (Acoustic version) – 3:47
- Track 1 from the album Spellbound.
- Tracks 2–6 were previously unreleased.

== Personnel ==
- Gary Hughes – vocals
- Vinny Burns – Lead guitars
- John Halliwell – Rhythm guitars
- Ged Rylands – keyboards
- Steve McKenna – bass guitar
- Greg Morgan – drums

== Production ==
- Mixing – Rafe McKenna (Track 1)
- Mixing – Audu Obaje (Tracks 2, 4–6)
