= No More Time =

Studio album by Darrel Treece-Birch
- Released: 19 August 2016
- Recorded: 2016
- Genre: Progressive Rock
- Length: 68:51
- Label: Melodic Revolution Records MRRCD 22129
- Producer: Darrel Treece-Birch

Darrel Treece-Birch chronology
Celestial (2015)	No More Time (2016)	Healing Touch (2017)

No More Time is the second full-length studio album by the British keyboard player Darrel Treece-Birch, which was released in August 2016. Lyrically, Treece-Birch uses water as the backdrop for the 15 tracks that make the album, which begins at some distant point outside of the space-time continuum and follows the very essence of the human spirit through its journey to finally return home to the Nexus of life's eternal regeneration.

== Track listing ==
All songs written by Darrel Treece-Birch.

1. Nexus Pt1 - 1:30
2. Earthbound - 4:21
3. Riding The Waves - 5:09
4. Hold On - 4:07
5. Requiem Pro Caris - 3:21
6. Nexus Pt2 - 1:26
7. Twilight - 3:47
8. Mother (Olive's Song) - 4:37
9. Freedom Paradigm - 6:03
10. Nexus Pt3 - 1:11
11. The River Dream - 6:59
12. No More Time - 8:00
13. Legacy - 4:02
14. Music Of The Spheres - 7:34
15. Return To The Nexus - 7:37

== Personnel ==
- Darrel Treece-Birch - Keyboards, Vocals, Bass Guitars, Mandolin, Drums

== Special Guests ==
- Phil Brown (Counterparts UK) - Acoustic Guitar, Electric Guitar
- Steve Grocott (Ten) - Electric Guitar
- Karen Fell (Gary Hughes Band) - Vocals
- Dan Mitchell (Formerly of Ten) - Electric Guitar
- John Power (Counterparts UK) - Bass and Fretless Bass Guitar, Acoustic Guitar, Electric Guitar, & Violin
- Dann RosIngana (Ten) - Electric Guitar
- Alan Taylor (Nth Ascension) - Vocals, Acoustic Guitar, Electric Guitar
- Gavin Walker (Nth Ascension) - Bass Guitar
- Martin Walker (Nth Ascension) - Electric Guitar

== Production ==
- Recorded at War Room, Taylormade Studio, The Dog House Studio, Westmorland Studio, RW Studio, SJG Studio, Sandyforth Studio,
- Engineered, Produced and Mixed by Darrel Treece-Birch
- Mastered by Dave Aston, Digital Audio, Skipton, UK
