= The Name of the Rose (disambiguation) =

The Name of the Rose may refer to:

- The Name of the Rose (Il nome della rosa), a 1980 Italian novel
  The Name of the Rose (film), the 1986 film adaptation
  The Name of the Rose, a 2008 board game based on the novel, published by Ravensburger
  The Name of the Rose (miniseries), a television miniseries adaptation released in 2019
- The Name of the Rose (album), a 1996 studio album by Ten, featuring an eponymous 8:31 minute track
- The Name of the Rose (EP), an EP by Ten, released in 1996

== See also ==
- "Au nom de la rose", a 1999 French song by Moos
