= Once and Future King Part II =

Studio album by Gary Hughes
- Released: 2003
- Genre: Hard rock
- Length: 56:09
- Label: Frontiers; FR CD 162D
- Producer: Gary Hughes

Gary Hughes chronology
Once and Future King Part I (2003)	Once and Future King Part II (2003)	Veritas (2007)

Gary Hughes compilation chronology
The Reissues (2000)	Decades (2021)

Once and Future King Part II is the fifth studio album released by Gary Hughes.

== Track listing ==
All songs written by Gary Hughes.

1. "Kill the King" – 5:51
2. "There by the Grace of the Gods (Go I)" – 5:10
3. "I Still Love You (I Still Do)" – 4:06
4. "Oceans of Tears" – 4:30
5. "Rise from the Shadows" – 3:44
6. "Believe Enough to Fight" – 5:02
7. "The Hard Way" – 3:46
8. "The Pagan Dream" – 5:02
9. "Demon Down" – 3:45
10. "Deius" (Instrumental) – 1:41
11. "Without You" – 6:34
12. "Once and Future King" – 6:58

== Personnel ==
=== Singers-The Cast ===
- D. C. Cooper – King Aelle (Track 1)
- Gary Hughes – King Arthur (Tracks 2 and 3)
- Lana Lane – Queen Guinevere (Track 4)
- Irene Jansen – Morgana (Track 5)
- Bob Catley – Merlin (Track 6)
- Sabine Edelsbacher – Nimue (Tracks 6 and 8)
- Doogie White – Mordred (Tracks 7 and 9)
- Sean Harris – Sir Galahad (Track 11)
- Harry Hess – (Track 12)

=== Musicians-The Players ===
- Gary Hughes – guitar, piano, keyboards, backing vocals and programming
- Chris Francis – guitars
- John Halliwell – guitars
- Steve McKenna – Bass guitars
- Greg Morgan – drums and percussion
- Paul Hodson – piano and keyboards (Track 1, 4, 6 and 9)
- Graham Woodcock – keyboards (Track 5), backing vocals
- Jason Thanos – backing vocals
- Damian Wilson – backing vocals
- Andy Bramhall – backing vocals
- Pete Coleman – backing vocals

== Production ==
- Mixing – Pete Coleman
- Engineer – Gary Hughes
- Additional Engineering – Pete Coleman, Audu Obaje, Doug Kasper, Erik Norlander, Harry Hess, Billy Churchill and Jason Thanos
