= Ascension of Kings =

Studio album by Nth Ascension
- Released: December 13, 2014
- Recorded: 2013–2014
- Genre: Progressive rock
- Length: 56:52
- Label: Sonic Vista Vista AUROEX045
- Producer: Nth Ascension

Nth Ascension chronology
Frequences of Day & Night (2011)	Ascension of Kings (2014)

Professional ratings
Review scores
Source	Rating
Liverpool Sound & Vision	
New Wave Of British Heavy Metal	
The Dedicated Rocker Society	
Prog Archives	4/5 stars
Firebrand’s Rock & Metal Express	5/5 stars
Prog Planet	
Monkey Castle	(8/10)
Metal Integral	(17/20)
Power Play Magazine	
Prog Music Talk	
DPRP	(8/10)
Background Magazine	(9/10)

Ascension of Kings is the first full-length studio album by the British Progressive Rock band Nth Ascension, which was released in December 2014. While not being a concept album, the album includes a three part suite entitled ‘Clanaan Chronicles’ which will is planned to run and occur on the band's subsequent albums. It follows a story by keyboard player Darrel Treece-Birch in the vein of The Chronicles of Narnia and The Lord of the Rings which sees the rescue/redemption of a tortured realm from an evil dictator by a Seventh Rider who ultimately ascends to be a prophesied King.

== Track listing ==
All songs written by Nth Ascension.

1. Fourth Kingdom - 6:21
2. Return Of The King - 9:06
3. Strange Dreams - 7:24
4. Overture (Clanaan Part 1) - 6:08
5. Realm With A Soul (Clanaan Part 2) - 3:51
6. Seventh Rider (Clanaan Part 3) - 4:00
7. Weight Of The World - 6:43
8. Vision - 18:44

== Personnel ==
- Alan "Spud" Taylor - Vocals
- Martin Walker - Guitars
- Gavin Walker - Bass Guitar
- Darrel Treece-Birch - Keyboards
- Craig Walker - Drums and Percussion

== Production ==
- Recorded at Berlin Studios Blackpool for Drums in 2013, and at RW Studios in Rossall and at The War Room studio in Cleveleys from November 2013 to March 2014.
- Engineered by Phil Brown and mixed by Martin Walker and Nth Ascension * Mastered at Digital Audio in Skipton, UK
- Vocals Recorded at DogHouse Studio in Blackpool by Gary Hughes of Ten
- Backing Vocals by Gary Hughes of Ten

== Trivia ==
The track entitled Strange Dreams has a ‘Matrix’ type theme to the lyric, while the track Vision recounts the story of Moses vs Rameses from the perspective of a slave. On the other hand, the track Weight Of The World tells the story of desperation and fear that can cripple the soul but how that can be lifted through each other and true friendship.
