= Chris Achilléos =

British painter (1947–2021)

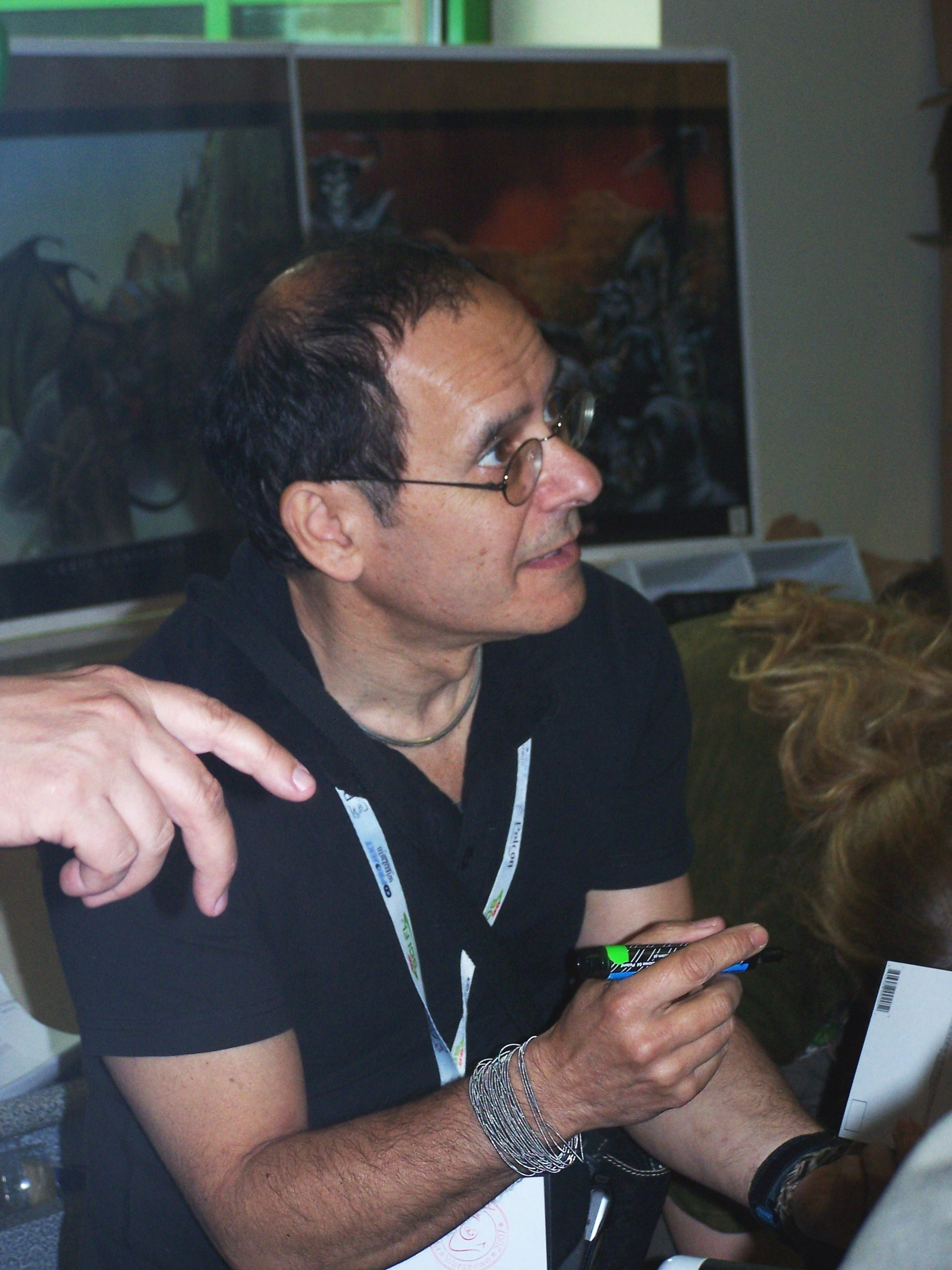
- Achilléos at Polcon, 2007
- Born: Χριστόφορος Αχιλλέως; Christos Achilléos; 26 August 1947; Famagusta, British Cyprus
- Died: 6 December 2021 (aged 74); Bridgwater, Somerset, UK
- Education: Hornsey College of Art
- Known for: Fantasy art, illustration

Christos "Chris" Achilléos (26 August 1947 – 6 December 2021) was a Cypriot-born British painter and illustrator who specialised in fantasy artwork and glamour illustration.

== Early life and education ==
Christos Achilléos was born on 26 August 1947 in Famagusta, British Cyprus to a Greek Cypriot family. In 1959, Achilléos' family emigrated to the United Kingdom and settled in London. Achilléos studied Hornsey College of Art.

== Career ==
His work has appeared in Heavy Metal and Radio Times magazines, on book covers (including series based on the Conan the Barbarian character, TV's Doctor Who and Star Trek, as well as the Fighting Fantasy gamebook series), and in collections of his own work. He has also participated in various film projects including Heavy Metal and Willow as a conceptual artist, (his iconic poster image commissioned in 1980 featuring Taarna and her birdlike steed are still featured on the DVD release) and created a proposed poster for Blade Runner.

Achilléos created the controversial cover for Whitesnake's 1979 album, Lovehunter, which showed a naked woman straddling a giant serpent. In an interview with MelodicRock, Gary Hughes stated that Achilléos thereafter "had a policy of not working with bands". The original artwork, along with several other pieces, were stolen from him in the 1980s and sold to a private collector. However, he designed an album cover and artwork in 2003 with Gary Hughes' rock opera Once and Future King Part I. His influence was also felt in the Kate Bush video for "Babooshka", in which the character's costume resembles the cover portrait he did of the heroine of the 1978 novel Raven - Swordsmistress of Chaos.

Following 1990, he mostly worked in designing fantasy trading cards as well as selling prints and original works of art.

Chris Achilléos died on 6 December 2021, at the age of 74.

== Collections ==
Achilléos had published several book collections, including:

- Beauty and the Beast (1978)
- Sirens (1986)
- Medusa (1988)
- Amazona (2004)

== See also ==
- Concept art
- Fantastic art
