= Return to Evermore =

Studio album by Ten
- Released: 23 June 2004
- Genre: Hard rock
- Length: 66:46 (70:23)
- Label: Frontiers Records
- Producer: Gary Hughes

Ten chronology
Far Beyond the World (2001)	Return to Evermore (2004)	The Essential Collection 1995–2005 (2005)

Asian version cover

Professional ratings
Review scores
Source	Rating
Rock Hard	8/10

Return to Evermore is the seventh studio album by English hard rock band Ten, released in 2004. It was the first Ten album with the lead guitarist Chris Francis, who replaced Vinny Burns two years before the release of the album.

== Track listing ==
All songs written by Gary Hughes.

1. "Apparition" – 8:34
2. "Dreamtide" – 6:29
3. "Evermore" – 4:37
4. "Sail Away" – 5:12
5. "Temple of Love" – 4:46
6. "Even the Ghosts Cry" – 5:52
7. "Strangers in the Night" – 5:19
8. "Evil's on Top in the World" – 4:31
9. "The One" – 5:33
10. "Lost Soul" – 5:29
11. "Stay a While" – 4:42
12. "Tearing My Heart Out" – 5:42

Asian version (Avalon Records MICP-10444) adds

13. "It's You I Adore" – 3:38

== Personnel ==
- Gary Hughes – vocals
- Chris Francis – lead guitars
- John Halliwell – rhythm guitars
- Steve McKenna – bass guitar
- Paul Hodson – keyboards
- Greg Morgan – drums and percussion
- Pete Coleman – English pipes (track 3)
- Jason Thanos – backing vocals

Production

- Mixing – Pete Coleman
- Engineers – Gary Hughes, Roger Smith and Jason Thanos
- Additional engineering – Pete Coleman, Billy Churchill and Mark Sumner
