= Something Wicked This Way Comes (Ten album) =

Studio album by Ten
- Released: 20 January 2023
- Genre: Hard rock
- Length: 61:14
- Label: Frontiers (FR CD 1284)
- Producer: Gary Hughes

Ten chronology
Here Be Monsters (2022)	Something Wicked This Way Comes (2023)

Something Wicked This Way Comes is the sixteenth studio album by the English melodic hard rock band Ten.

== Track listing ==
All songs written by Gary Hughes.

1. "Look For The Rose (Part 2)" – 6:30
2. "Brave New Lie" - 4:39
3. "The Tidal Wave" - 4:25
4. "Parabellum" - 6:41
5. "Something Wicked This Way Comes" - 7:05
6. "The Fire And The Rain" - 5:31
7. "New Found Hope" - 5:44
8. "The Only Way Out" - 5:15
9. "When Darkness Comes" - 5:55
10. "The Greatest Show On Earth" - 5:34

== Personnel ==
=== Ten ===
- Gary Hughes – vocals, guitars, backing vocals
- Dann Rosingana – lead guitars
- Steve Grocott – lead guitars
- Darrel Treece-Birch – keyboards, programming
- Steve Mckenna – bass guitar
- Markus Kullman – drums and percussion

Additional musicians:

- Scott Hughes - backing vocals
- Karen Fell - backing vocals

=== Production ===
- Gary Hughes – production
