= Darrel Treece-Birch =

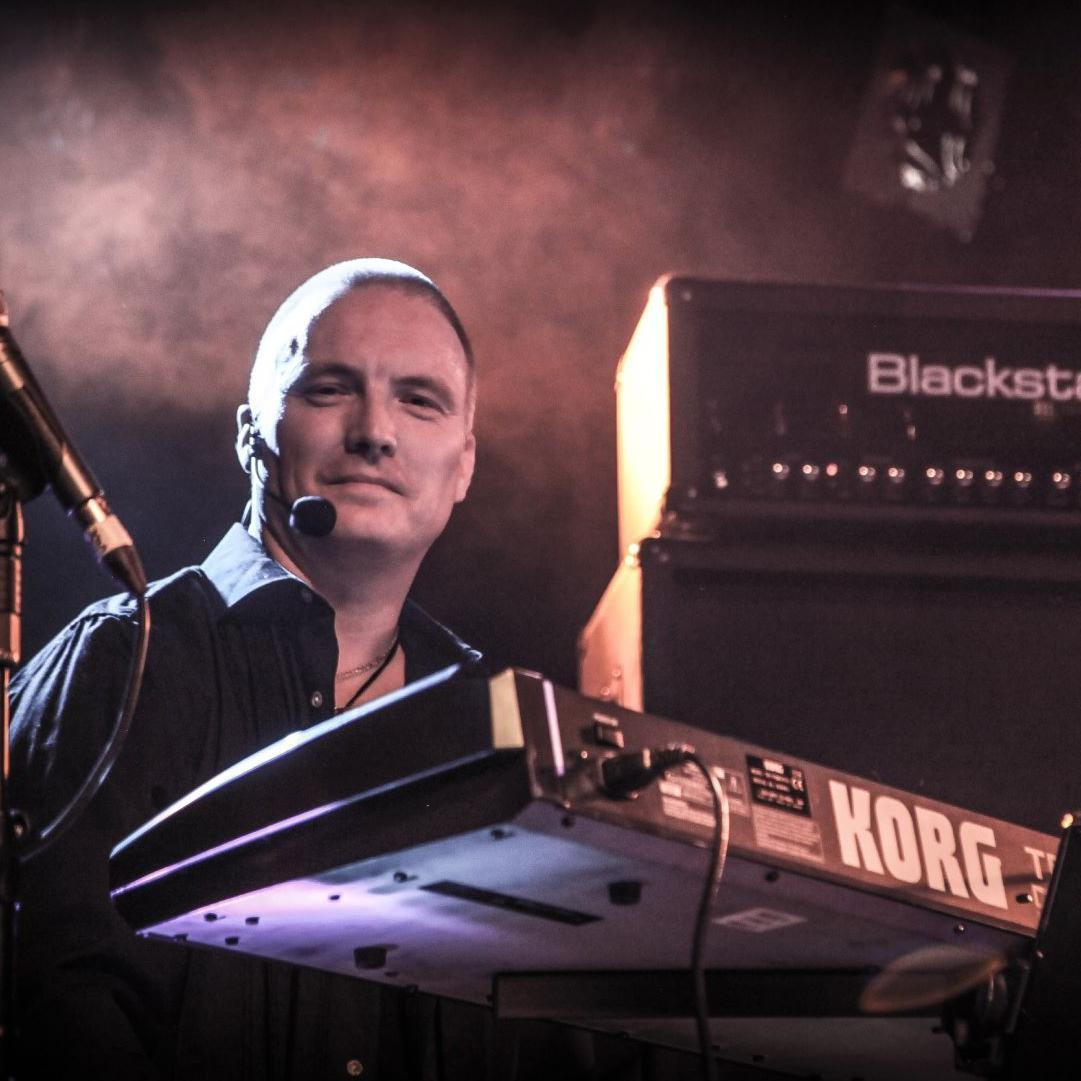
- Darrel Treece-Birch

Background information
- Born: Darrel Treece-Birch; 21 January 1967 (age 59); Fleetwood, England
- Genres: Hard rock, melodic rock, Progressive Rock
- Occupations: Musician, songwriter, producer
- Instruments: Keyboards, Piano, Bass, Guitar, Drums
- Years active: 1986–present
- Website: http://darreltreece-birch.com/

Darrel Treece-Birch (born 21 January 1967, in Fleetwood, England is an English hard rock/progressive rock keyboard player and songwriter, best known for his work with the Melodic Hard Rock band Ten, as a solo artist and up until 2020, with the progressive rock band, Nth Ascension.

== Biography ==
Darrel Treece-Birch started playing keyboards from an early age. Inspired by the early electronica music of Oxygene and Equinox of Jean-Michel Jarre and the ambient orchestration of Vangelis, he soon got involved in various bands, with the most notable one being the Fleetwood-based Purple on the Storm.

Darrel Treece-Birch was a founding member of the northwest English progressive rock band Nth Ascension (originally formed as Nth Degree in 2010). In 2011, the band released their first studio album under the name Nth Ascension, entitled Frequencies of Day & Night, which was issued as a free download via the Aurovine website. Late 2012 saw the addition of a fifth member, a full time bass player. The second studio album by Nth Ascension entitled Ascension of Kings, was released in late 2014 via Sonic Vista Music to much critical acclaim. Nth Ascension's third album In Fine Initium was released in October 2016 on Melodic Revolution Records garnering much international attention from reviewers and fans. Nth Ascension released the album Stranger than Fiction under their own label Metatronic Records on 31 May 2019. In March 2021, Darrel Treece-Birch officially left Nth Ascension.

Darrel Treece-Birch joined the melodic hard rock Band Ten in 2011, with whom he has released eight studio albums so far, 2012's Heresy and Creed, 2014's Albion, 2015's Isla De Muerta and EP The Dragon and Saint George, 2016's compilation album Battlefield – The Rocktopia Records Collection, 2017's Gothica, 2018's Illuminati and 2022's Here Be Monsters.

Darrel Treece-Birch is an accomplished solo artist who was signed to US label MRR in 2015 to January 2019, and released four studio albums with Melodic Revolution Records, including Celestial a two-part digital only release in October 2015, his critically acclaimed album No More Time, August 2016 (which included guest appearances by several of his colleagues and former bandmates from Ten, Nth Ascension and Counterparts UK), Healing Touch (where he composed, performed, played all instruments, mixed, mastered and produced the work including the original painting for the artwork) October 2017 and finally in December of 2018 releasing his digital only instrumental album The first step...is to take one.

2018 was a record year for Treece-Birch releasing an album with Ten: Illuminati, guesting on Signal Red's Under The Radar, (Steve Grocott's band (guitarist - Ten)), producing, mixing, mastering and performing on Michael-Alan Taylor's (vocalist -Nth Ascension) album Avalonia: The Sonnets of Guinevere, and releasing his album The first step ... is to take one in addition to recording his final album with Nth Ascension.

2019 saw a delay to the Nth Ascension album Stranger Than Fiction which was due for release in late 2018. The album was released late May. Ten released Opera Omnia: The Complete Works in April which was the complete works of the band from 1996 to 2018's Illuminati album. Treece-Birch worked on the inner sleeve artwork sleeves for each individual album alongside his Ten band member John Halliwell.

In 2021 Darrel performed as guest musician for Gary Hughes’ new solo album Waterside in which he played keyboards and acoustic drums. He also created and produced the sleeve/booklet art for both Waterside and the double-album best of compilation titled "Decades" also by Gary Hughes and released by Frontiers Records. In October 2021, Treece-Birch performed on the debut studio album entitled Prophecy by the British melodic Hard Rock band TAO.

2022 Ten released Here Be Monsters on 18th February. This was followed by guest performances on the entirety of the Scar For Life album Sociophobia. Scar For Life is the brainchild of friend and collaborator Alexandre Santos. On 29th September Treece-Birch guested on several tracks for his Fleetwood friend Tony Mitchell for his album Unfinished Business released by Pride & Joy Music.

2023 Ten Released Something Wicked This Way Comes on 23rd January with Treece-Birch spending the early part of that year finishing a number of songs to be part of his new solo project Atlantea. Originally destined as his 5th solo album it was determined to separate his purely instrumental work from his song creations. Treece-Birch was signed by Finish Prog Rock label Lion Music. Bringing in several friends as guest musicians and vocalists, Darrel Treece-Birch's Atlantea debut album Choices garnered high praise from critics and reviewers. 2024 became somewhat of a gap year for music releases. Whilst steadily working on more Atlantea material, Ten returned to a series of live dates across the UK which was met with enthusiasm and cheer. The band brought in Nth Ascension bandmate Craig Walker on drums and played several dates across the country.

Continuing the desire for performance Ten continued touring over 2025 beginning the year on the Silja Sweden/Finland Ferry Rock Cruise with new bass player and childhood friend Alan Allcock. Whilst Ten toured, Treece-Birch released the Atlantea sophomore album Life containing the 19 minute epic Three Lights with Lion Music CEO Lars Eric Mattsson played guitar on.

2026 Treece-Birch recording the keyboards on a song called The Traveller for his friend Tony Mitchell. The album titled Immortalis was released on 14th August and was swiftly followed up by Atlantea's third release on September 10th titled Truthsayer. Once again released under Lion Music for all Digital and Worldwide Distribution with CD's printed under Treece-Birch's own label Moozac Records.

== Discography ==
=== With Ten ===
- Heresy and Creed (2012)
- Albion (2014)
- Isla De Muerta (2015)
- The Dragon And Saint George EP (2015)
- Battlefield – The Rocktopia Records Collection (2016)
- Gothica (2017)
- Illuminati (2018)
- Opera Omnia: The Complete Works (2019)
- Here Be Monsters (2022)
- Something Wicked This Way Comes (2023)

=== With Gary Hughes ===
- Waterside (2021)

=== With Nth Ascension ===
- Frequencies of Day & Night (2011) Self Release (CDR) 5 November 2011
- Ascension Of Kings (2014) Released by Sonic Vista Music - 13 December 2014 - AUROEX045
- In Fine Initium (2016) Released by Melodic Revolution Records - 16 September 2016 - MRRCD 22131
- Stranger Than Fiction (2019) Released by Metatronic Records - 31 May 2019 - NTH CD1

=== As Darrel Treece-Birch - Darrel Treece-Birch's Atlantea ===
- Darrel Treece-Birch (Celestial) (2015) Released by Melodic Revolution Records - 2 October 2015 - MRRCD 22118
- Darrel Treece-Birch No More Time (2016) Released by Melodic Revolution Records - 19 August 2016 - MRRCD 22129
- Darrel Treece-Birch Healing Touch (2017) Released by Melodic Revolution Records - 27 October 2017 - MRRCD 22146
- Darrel Treece-Birch The first step...is to take one (2018) Released by Melodic Revolution Records - 14 December 2018 MRRDM 201164
- Darrel Treece-Birch's Atlantea (Choices) (2023) Released by Lion Music Records / Moozac Records - 6 October 2023 - MZRCD-A01
- Darrel Treece-Birch's Atlantea (Life) (2025) Released by Lion Music Records / Moozac Records - 15 August 2025 - MZRCD-A02
- Darrel Treece-Birch's Atlantea (Truthsayer) (2026) Released by Lion Music Records / Moozac Records - 10 September 2026 - MZRCD-A03

=== Guest appearances ===
- Signal Red (Under The Radar) (2018) Released by Escape Music - 23 February 2018 - ESM314
- Michael-Alan Taylor (Avalonia: The Sonnets of Guinevere) (2018) Released by Melodic Revolution Records - 29 June 2018
- TAO (Prophecy) (2021) Released by Tarot Label Media - 15 September 2021 - TLMCD 001
- Scar For Life (Sociophobia) (2022) Released by Pride & Joy Music - 22 July 2022 - PJM12975
- Tony Mitchell's Kiss Of The Gypsy (Unfinished Business) (2022) Released by MR Records - 29 September 2022 - MRR168
- Tony Mitchell (Immortalis) (2026) Released by AOR BLVD Records - 14 August 2026 - ABR040

=== Solo Live performances ===
- St. Anne's on the Sea International Kite Festival (St. Anne's on the Sea, UK) August 2018
