= Stormwarning (Ten album) =

Studio album by Ten
- Released: February 18, 2011
- Genre: Hard rock
- Length: 59:24
- Label: Frontiers Records
- Producer: Gary Hughes and Dennis Ward

Ten chronology
The Twilight Chronicles (2006)	Stormwarning (2011)	Heresy and Creed (2012)

Professional ratings
Review scores
Source	Rating
Classic Rock	7/10
Powermetal.de	8/10
Rock Hard	8/10

Stormwarning is the ninth studio album by English melodic hard rock band Ten. It was the band's first album after a five-year break. It was released in Japan in January 2011 and in the rest of the world in February the same year. The album cover was designed by Luis Royo. It was the first Ten album to be mixed and mastered by Dennis Ward. The band continued their collaboration with the well known music producer for their subsequent studio albums as well, including the release of the band's latest studio album Here Be Monsters.

== Track listing ==
All songs written by Gary Hughes.

1. "Endless Symphony" – 7:26
2. "Centre of My Universe" – 6:07
3. "Kingdom Come" – 5:35
4. "Book of Secrets" – 5:18
5. "Stormwarning" – 5:39
6. "Invisible" – 5:38
7. "Love Song" – 7:07
8. "The Hourglass and the Landslide" – 4:49
9. "Destiny" – 6:13
10. "The Wave" – 5:32

The Asian version (Avalon Records MICP-10972) adds:

11. "The Darkness" – 4:19

== Personnel ==
- Gary Hughes – vocals, guitars, backing vocals
- Neil Fraser – lead guitars
- John Halliwell – rhythm guitars
- Paul Hodson – keyboards, programming
- Mark Sumner – bass guitar
- Mark Zonder – drums and percussion
- Additional guitars by Johnny Gibbons
- Jason Thanos - backing vocals

Production

- Mixing/mastering – Dennis Ward

== Concepts ==
The song "Kingdom Come" was inspired by a personal family story of the singer Gary Hughes

== Chart positions ==
Year	Chart	Position
2011
2011	HMV Japanese Charts	15
