= Strength of Heart =

Gary Hughes

Studio album by Gary Hughes
- Released: 1990
- Genre: Hard rock
- Length: 61:20 (61:33)
- Label: Chrysalis Records; 321945 2
- Producer: Gary Hughes, Simon Humphrey

Gary Hughes chronology
Big Bad Wolf (1989)	Gary Hughes (1990)	Gary Hughes (1992)

Gary Hughes compilation chronology
The Reissues (2000)	Decades (2021)

Strength Of Heart is an album by Gary Hughes. It is the re-released version of Hughes' 1989 first album Big Bad Wolf.

== Track listing ==
All songs, music and lyrics written by Gary Hughes.

1. "Some Kind Of Evil" – 4:49
2. "Only True Love Lasts Forever" – 3:43
3. "Strength Of Heart" – 4:43
4. "Bringin' All Of Your Love To Me" – 5:10
5. "Big Bad Wolf" – 3:38
6. "Helen's Eyes" – 4:55
7. "Man Behind The Mask" – 3:33
8. "Christine" – 4:27
9. "Hammer Your Heart" – 3:04
10. "Can't Get You Out Of My Head" – 4:50
11. "Photograph" – 5:31
12. "Stay" – 4:23
13. "Vigilante" – 4:58
14. "Helen's Eyes (Reprise)" – 3:36

== Personnel ==
- Gary Hughes – vocals, Electric and Acoustic guitars, Fretless Bass. preliminary Drum Programming
- Simon Humphrey – Fretted Bass, Drum and Bass Programming, Shirt
- David Hewson – keyboards And Synthesisers
- Ian Kirkham – Sax
- Sandy McLelland – Backing Vocals
- Additional keyboards – Howard Smith

== Production ==
Mixed and Mastered at Woodlands Studios

- Produced by Simon Humphrey and David Hewson
- Arrangements by Gary Hughes, Simon Humphrey and David Hewson
- Mixing – Gary Hughes and Simon Humphrey (except tracks 10 & 11)
- Mixing – Brad Anthony (tracks 10 & 11)
- Engineering – Simon Humphrey
- Additional Engineering – Patric Gordon, Mark Odonoughue, Simon Osbourne, Danny Pickard, Neil Ferguson.
