= Waterside (album) =

Studio album by Gary Hughes
- Released: 12 March 2021
- Genre: Hard rock
- Length: 54:23
- Label: Frontiers
- Producer: Gary Hughes

Gary Hughes chronology
| Veritas (2007) | Waterside (2021) | Decades (2021) |

Gary Hughes compilation chronology
| The Reissues (2000) | Decades (2021) |

Waterside is the seventh studio album by Gary Hughes. This is the first solo album for Hughes in 14 years. The album was released on 12 March 2021, through Frontiers Records.

== Track listing ==
All songs written by Gary Hughes.

1. "All at Once It Feels Like I Believe" – 4:34
2. "Electra-Glide" – 5:11
3. "Lay Down" – 7:52
4. "The Runaway Damned" – 5:00
5. "Screaming in the Halflight" – 4:14
6. "Waterside" – 4:17
7. "Video Show" – 5:21
8. "Save My Soul" – 5:03
9. "Seduce Me" – 4:36
10. "When Love Is Done" – 3:37

== Personnel ==
- Gary Hughes – lead and backing vocals, guitars, bass, keyboards and programming
- Dann Rosingana – guitars
- David Rosingana – bass
- Darrel Treece-Birch – keyboards and drums
- Karen Fell – backing vocals
- Scott Hughes – lead and backing vocals

Production

- Produced, engineered and mixed by Gary Hughes
