= The Name of the Rose (EP) =

EP by Ten
- Released: December 4, 1996
- Genre: Hard rock
- Length: 34:47
- Label: Zero Corporation; XRCN-1291
- Producer: Gary Hughes, Mike Stone

Ten chronology
The Name of the Rose (1996)	The Name of the Rose (1996)	The Robe (1997)

Ten EP chronology
The Name of the Rose (1996)	The Robe (1997)

The Name of the Rose is the first EP released by English melodic hard rock band Ten. The compact disc was officially released only in Asian markets.

== Track listing ==
All songs written by Gary Hughes.

1. "The Name of the Rose" (Edit version) – 6:15
2. "When Only Love Can Ease the Pain" – 5:59
3. "After the Love Has Gone" (Live version)– 5:21
4. "Can't Slow Down" (Live version) – 6:18
5. "The Name of the Rose" (Karaoke version) – 8:43
6. "Message From Gary Hughes" (Spoken word) – 2:11
- All tracks were previously unreleased.
- Tracks 1 and 5, original version on the album The Name of the Rose.
- Tracks 3 and 4, recorded live on May 5, 1996, in Wigan, England, by Royston Hollyer and Audu Obaje.

== Personnel ==
- Gary Hughes – vocals
- Vinny Burns – Lead guitars
- John Halliwell – Rhythm guitars
- Ged Rylands – keyboards
- Shelly – bass guitar
- Greg Morgan – drums

== Production ==
- Producer – Gary Hughes and Mike Stone (Tracks 1 and 5)
- Producer – Gary Hughes (Tracks 2, 3 and 4)
- Mixing – Mike Stone (Tracks 1, 2 and 5)
- Mixing – Ray Brophy (Tracks 3 and 4)
