= Veritas (Gary Hughes album) =

Studio album by Gary Hughes
- Released: 2007
- Genre: Hard rock
- Length: 62:37
- Label: Frontiers; FR CD 354
- Producer: Gary Hughes

Gary Hughes chronology
Once and Future King Part II (2003)	Veritas (2007)	Waterside (2021)

Gary Hughes compilation chronology
The Reissues (2000)	Decades (2021)

Professional ratings
Review scores
Source	Rating
Allmusic	(not rated)

Veritas is the sixth studio album released by Gary Hughes, which was released in 2007.

== Track listing ==
All songs written by Gary Hughes.

1. "Veritas" – 4:45
2. "See Love Through My Eyes" – 4:32
3. "In My Head" – 4:20
4. "Time to Pray" – 4:56
5. "Wide Awake in Dreamland" – 5:41
6. "I Pray for You" – 4:38
7. "Synchronicity" – 8:07
8. "Strange" – 5:18
9. "All I Want Is You" – 7:04
10. "I Know It's Time" – 4:07
11. "The Emerald Sea" – 3:46
12. "The Everlasting Light" – 5:23

== Personnel ==
- Gary Hughes – lead and backing vocals, guitars, bass, keyboards and programming
- Chris Francis – guitars
- Johnny Gibbons – guitars
- John Halliwell – guitars
- Rick Stewart – bass
- Simon Brayshaw – bass
- Jason Robinson – drums
- David Ingledew – drums

Additional Backing Vocals by:

- Scott Hughes – backing vocals
- Hayley Hughes – backing vocals
- Matthey Foy – backing vocals
- Jason Thanos – backing vocals

== Production ==
- Produced, engineered and mixed by: Gary Hughes
