= The Twilight Chronicles =

Studio album by Ten
- Released: August 25, 2006
- Genres: Hard rock, symphonic rock
- Length: 71:01 (76:55)
- Label: Frontiers Records
- Producer: Gary Hughes

Ten chronology
The Essential Collection 1995–2005 (2005)	The Twilight Chronicles (2006)	Stormwarning (2011)

Professional ratings
Review scores
Source	Rating
Metal Express Radio	7/10
Metal Reviews	70/100

The Twilight Chronicles is the eighth studio album released by the British hard rock band Ten. The album marked a shift in the band's sound, relying more heavily on symphonic orchestrations and musical landscape, more so than ever before.

== Track listing ==
All songs written by Gary Hughes.

1. "The Prologue (The Elysian Fields)/Rome" – 12:19
2. "The Chronicles" – 6:43
3. "The Elysian Fields" – 6:49
4. "Hallowed Ground" – 7:39
5. "This Heart Goes On" – 4:24
6. "Oblivion" – 7:03
7. "The Twilight Masquerade" – 6:38
8. "Tourniquet" – 6:49
9. "Born to the Grave" – 5:00
10. "When This Night Is Done/The Epilogue" – 7:36

The Asian version (Avalon Records MICP-10582) adds:

11. "Fahrenheit" – 5:54

== Personnel ==
- Gary Hughes – lead, backing vocals and programming
- Chris Francis – lead guitars and bass guitar
- John Halliwell – rhythm guitars
- Paul Hodson – keyboards and programming
- Frank Basile – drums and percussion

Production

- Executive producers – Chris Francis and John Halliwell
- Mixing – Gary Hughes
- Engineer – Gary Hughes, Chris Francis, Paul Hodson and Frank Basile
- Additional engineering – Simon Brayshaw, Jason Hutton, Roger Smith and Annette Stelfox
- Drums recorded by Frank Basile then "Gogged Up" by Chris Francis.

== Concepts ==
- "The Prologue (The Elysian Fields) / Rome" is about the legend of the foundation of Ancient Rome.
- "The Chronicles" is based on The Chronicles of Narnia, a series of books by C.S Lewis.
