= Gothica (Ten album) =

2017 studio album by Ten

Studio album by Ten
- Released: 7 July 2017
- Recorded: December 2016 – January 2017
- Genre: Hard rock
- Length: 57:57
- Label: Frontiers; Avalon
- Producer: Gary Hughes

Ten chronology
Isla De Muerta (2015)	Gothica (2017)	Illuminati (2018)

Gothica is the thirteenth studio album by English hard rock band Ten. The album was released on 7 July 2017. The album was mixed and mastered by Dennis Ward, while the cover was illustrated by Stan W. Decker. The first single from the album, the track "Paragon", was released on 26 May, while the second one "La Luna Dra-Cu-La", was released on 23 June. The first official music video for "Gothica", was for the track "Travellers", on the 3rd of July 2017, while "Jekyll And Hyde", the second official music video from the album, was released on the 1st of August, 2017. The album proved to be another successful release for the band, reaching the 11th position on BBC's Rock Albums Charts.

== Track listing ==
All songs written by Gary Hughes.

1. The Grail – 8:06
2. Jekyll and Hyde – 4:41
3. Travellers – 5:11
4. A Man for All Seasons – 7:00
5. In My Dreams – 5:08
6. The Wild King of Winter – 6:13
7. Paragon – 4:50
8. Welcome to the Freak Show – 5:35
9. La Luna Dra-Cu-La – 5:31
10. Into Darkness – 5:42
11. Paragon (Bonus Mix) (Japanese Bonus Track) – 3:37

== Personnel ==
=== Ten ===
- Gary Hughes – vocals, guitars, backing vocals
- Dann Rosingana – lead guitars
- Steve Grocott – lead guitars
- John Halliwell – rhythm guitars
- Darrel Treece-Birch – keyboards, programming
- Steve Mckenna – bass guitar
- Max Yates – drums and percussion

=== Production ===
- Gary Hughes – production
- Dennis Ward – mixing and mastering

== Concepts ==
- The lyrics of the track "Jekyll and Hyde" are based on Robert Louis Stevenson's Strange Case of Dr Jekyll and Mr Hyde (1886).
- According to Gary Hughes, the lyrics of the track "Travellers" are inspired by H. G. Wells' The Time Machine (1895).
- The lyrics of the track "A Man for All Seasons" are based on Robert Bolt's A Man for All Seasons (1966).
- The lyrics of the track "Wild King of Winter" are based on George R. R. Martin's A Song of Ice and Fire series.

== Chart positions ==
Year	Chart	Position
2017
2017	U.K. Rock Albums Charts	11
