= Gary Hughes (album) =

Studio album by Gary Hughes
- Released: 1992
- Genre: Hard rock
- Length: 55:25 (60:03)
- Labels: Now & Then; NTHEN1
- Producers: Gary Hughes, Simon Humphrey

Gary Hughes chronology
Strength of Heart (1990)	Gary Hughes (1992)	Precious Ones (1998)

Gary Hughes compilation chronology
The Reissues (2000)	Decades (2021)

Professional ratings
Review scores
Source	Rating
Rock Hard	7/10

Gary Hughes is the second studio album released by Gary Hughes.

== Track listing ==
All songs written by Gary Hughes.

1. "This Thing of Beauty" – 5:25
2. "Seducer" – 4:39
3. "I Won't Break Your Heart" – 4:50
4. "Blonde Angel" – 5:25
5. "Suspended Animation" – 5:04
6. "It Must Be Love" – 5:17
7. "Till the Rivers Run Dry" – 4:53
8. "Criminal" – 4:53
9. "We Walk With Angels" – 5:47
10. "Now or Never" – 4:11
11. "Renegade" – 5:07

The 1997 fifth anniversary re-issue remastered version (NTHEN 40) adds:

12. "Look At the Rain" – 4:14

The 1997 release replaces track 4 with "Blonde Angel '93" – 5:59
Tracks 10 & 11 recorded live at a soundcheck in Koln, Germany on February 24, 1992.

== Personnel ==
- Gary Hughes – vocals, guitars and bass guitar
- Aziz Ibrahim – guitars
- Lee Revill – guitars
- Steve Steadman – bass guitar
- Gary Frankland – bass guitar
- David Hewson – keyboards
- Howard Smith – keyboards
- Darren Wilcox – drums
- Darren Lamberton – drums
- Steve Frankland – drums
- David Holt - drums on "Blonde Angel '93" and "Look At The Rain"

== Production ==
- Additional Production – David Hewson
- Mixing – Gary Hughes and Simon Humphrey (except tracks 10 & 11)
- Mixing – Brad Anthony (tracks 10 & 11)
- Engineer – Audu Obaje, Rayston Hollyer, Ray Brophy and Simon Humphrey (except tracks 10 & 11)
- Engineer – Brad Anthony (tracks 10 & 11)
