= Never Say Goodbye (Ten album) =

Live album by Ten
- Released: February 25, 1998
- Recorded: 1997
- Genre: Hard rock
- Length: 153:41
- Labels: Frontiers Records; FR CD 001

Ten chronology
The Robe (1997)	Never Say Goodbye (1998)	Spellbound (1999)

Professional ratings
Review scores
Source	Rating
Allmusic	not rated, no review link

Never Say Goodbye is a live album released by English hard rock band Ten. The double compact disc was recorded during 1997-1998 on "The Name of the Rose" and "The Robe" tours. It was the first album ever released by the Italian label Frontiers Records.

== Track listing ==
All songs written by Gary Hughes except where noted.

=== Disc one ===
1. "The Robe" – 9:12
2. "Bright on the Blade" – 4:52
3. "Wildest Dreams" – 5:24
4. "The Torch" – 5:47
5. "Yesterday Lies in the Flames" – 5:23
6. "The Rainbow" – 6:29 (Hughes, Zoe Hughes)
7. "The Crusades" (Instrumental) – 1:55 (Hughes, Vinny Burns)
8. "Don't Cry" – 6:13
9. "Goodnight Saigon" – 6:58
10. "Arcadia" – 7:45
11. "You're in My Heart" – 3:59
12. "The Loneliest Place in the World" – 11:28

=== Disc two ===
1. "Ten Fathoms Deep" – 7:09
2. "After the Love Has Gone" – 5:19
3. "Stay With Me" – 5:20
4. "Standing on the Edge of Time" – 5:09 (Hughes, Burns)
5. "Fly Like an Eagle" – 7:39
6. "Drum Solo" (Instrumental) – 1:18
7. "Battlelines" – 4:30
8. "The Pharaoh's Prelude: Ascension to the Afterlife" – 3:54
9. "Wait for You" – 6:08
10. "The Name of the Rose" – 9:16
11. "Black Moon Rising" (Studio version) – 4:05
12. "Venus and Mars" (Studio version) – 4:34
13. "If Only for a Day" (Studio version) – 8:13
14. "Give Me a Piece of Your Heart" (Studio version) – 5:42 (Hughes, Burns)

The Asian version (Zero Corporation XRCN-2021-2) does not include tracks 11-14.

Asian version tracklist:

=== Disc one ===
1. "The Robe"
2. "Bright on the Blade"
3. "Wildest Dreams"
4. "The Torch"
5. "Yesterday Lies in the Flames"
6. "The Rainbow"
7. "Goodnight Saigon"
8. "Arcadia"
9. "You're In My Heart" (acoustic)
10. "Close Your Eyes And Dream" (acoustic) - for Japan only
11. "Turn Around" (acoustic) - for Japan only
12. "The Loneliest Place in the World"

=== Disc two ===
1. "The Crusades"
2. "Don't Cry"
3. "Ten Fathoms Deep"
4. "After The Love Has gone"
5. "Stay With Me"
6. "Standing On The Edge Of Time"
7. "Fly Like An Eagle"
8. "Drum solo"
9. "Battlelines"
10. "The Pharaoh's Prelude"
11. "Wait For You"
12. "The Name Of The Rose"

== Personnel ==
- Gary Hughes – vocals
- Vinny Burns – Lead guitars
- John Halliwell – Rhythm guitars and backing vocals
- Ged Rylands – keyboards and backing vocals
- Steve McKenna – bass guitar and backing vocals
- Greg Morgan – drums and percussion

== Production ==
- Mixing – Ray Brophy
- Engineer – Ray Brophy
