= Far Beyond the World =

Studio album by Ten
- Released: 10 December 2001
- Genre: Hard rock
- Length: 62:19 (68:27)
- Label: Frontiers Records
- Producer: Gary Hughes

Ten chronology
Babylon (2000)	Far Beyond the World (2001)	Return to Evermore (2004)

Far Beyond the World is the sixth studio album released by the English hard rock band Ten in 2001. It was the last Ten album with the founding member guitarist Vinny Burns. The Asian version of the album has a different track listing.

== Track listing ==
All songs written by Gary Hughes.

European Version (Frontiers Records FR CD 099)

1. "Glimmer of Evil" - 5:48
2. "Strange Land" - 5:13
3. "High Tide" - 5:46
4. "What About Me" - 5:34
5. "Last of the Lovers" - 6:11
6. "Outlawed and Notorious" - 6:37
7. "Scarlet and the Grey" - 5:29
8. "Heart Like a Lion" - 5:16
9. "Black Shadows" - 5:29
10. "Who Do You Want To Love" - 5:44
11. "Far Beyond the World" - 5:09

Asian version (Victor Records VICP-61653)

1. "Scarlet and the Grey" – 5:29
2. "Strange Land" – 5:13
3. "What About Me?" – 5:34
4. "Glimmer of Evil" – 5:48
5. "Last of the Lovers" – 6:11
6. "Heart Like a Lion" – 5:16
7. "Black Shadows" – 5:29
8. "High Tide" – 5:46
9. "Far Beyond the World" – 5:09
10. "Who Do You Want to Love?" – 5:44
11. "Outlawed and Notorious" – 6:37

Asian version (Victor Records VICP-61653) adds

12. "The Soldier" – 6:11

2016 Japanese SHM-CD remaster (Avalon MICP-11299) adds

13. "In Love And War" - 4:47

== Personnel ==
- Gary Hughes – vocals
- Vinny Burns – lead guitars
- John Halliwell – rhythm guitars
- Steve McKenna – bass guitar
- Paul Hodson – keyboards
- Greg Morgan – drums

== Production ==
- Mixing – Tommy Newton
- Engineer – Paulo Melo
- Additional engineering – Audu Obaje, Ray Brophy, Vinny Burns and Gary Hughes
