= Once and Future King Part I =

Studio album by Gary Hughes
- Released: 2003
- Genre: Hard rock
- Length: 50:38
- Label: Frontiers; FR CD 161D
- Producer: Gary Hughes

Gary Hughes chronology
In Your Eyes EP (1998)	Once and Future King Part I (2003)	Once and Future King Part II (2003)

Gary Hughes compilation chronology
The Reissues (2000)	Decades (2021)

Once and Future King Part I is the fourth studio album released by Gary Hughes.

== Track listing ==
All songs written by Gary Hughes.

1. "Excalibur" – 6:22
2. "Dragon Island Cathedral" – 6:03
3. "At the End of Day" – 4:30
4. "The Reason Why" – 4:36
5. "Shapeshifter" – 4:45
6. "King for a Day" – 4:47
7. "Avalon" – 4:00
8. "Sinner" – 5:01
9. "In Flames" – 5:03
10. "Lies" – 5:31

== Personnel ==
=== Singers-The Cast ===
- Damian Wilson – (Track 1)
- Gary Hughes – King Arthur (Tracks 2, 3 and 10)
- Lana Lane – Queen Guinevere (Track 3)
- Danny Vaughn – Lancelot (Tracks 4 and 7)
- Irene Jansen – Morgana (Track 5)
- Bob Catley – Merlin (Tracks 6 and 9)
- Sean Harris – Sir Galahad (Track 8)

=== Musicians-The Players ===
- Gary Hughes – guitar, piano, keyboards, backing vocals and programming
- Chris Francis – guitars
- John Halliwell – guitars
- Steve McKenna – Bass guitars
- Greg Morgan – drums and percussion
- Arjen Lucassen – keyboards (Track 1)
- Paul Hodson – piano and keyboards (Track 6)
- Graham Woodcock – keyboards (Track 8)
- Jason Thanos – backing vocals
- Damian Wilson – backing vocals

== Production ==
- Mixing – Pete Coleman
- Engineer – Gary Hughes
- Additional Engineering – Pete Coleman, Audu Obaje, Arjen Lucassen, Erik Norlander, Billy Churchill and Jason Thanos
