= Illuminati (Ten album) =

Studio album by Ten
- Released: 9 November 2018
- Recorded: January 2018 – March 2018
- Genres: Melodic hard rock, hard rock
- Labels: Frontiers(FR CD 897); King Records (KICP-1945)
- Producer: Gary Hughes

Ten chronology
| Gothica (2017) | Illuminati (2018) | Opera Omnia (2019) |

Illuminati is the fourteenth studio album by the melodic hard rock band Ten. The album was released on the 9th of November 2018. As with the previous studio album of the band, the album cover was again illustrated by Stan W. Decker. The first single of the album, the track "Jericho", was released in September 19. On the day of the release of the album, the band also released a new music video/single for the track "The Esoteric Ocean". The album reached number 26 on the UK Rock & Metal Albums Chart.

== Track listing ==
All songs written by Gary Hughes.

1. Be as You Are Forever – 8:04
2. Shield Wall – 5:39
3. The Esoteric Ocean – 5:05
4. Jericho – 5:47
5. Rosetta Stone – 6:14
6. Illuminati – 5:42
7. Heaven and the Holier-Than-Thou – 5:28
8. Exile – 5:16
9. Mephistopheles – 5:13
10. Of Battles Lost and Won – 5:45
11. Rosetta Stone (remix) (Japanese Bonus Track) – 4:00

== Personnel ==
=== Ten ===
- Gary Hughes – vocals, guitars, backing vocals
- Dann Rosingana – lead guitars
- Steve Grocott – lead guitars
- John Halliwell – rhythm guitars
- Darrel Treece-Birch – keyboards, programming
- Steve Mckenna – bass guitar
- Max Yates – drums and percussion

=== Production ===
- Gary Hughes – production

== Chart positions ==
| Chart (2018) | Peak position |
|---|---|
| BBC UK Top 40 Rock Albums | 26 |
| US Top Hard Rock Albums | 83 |
| Oricon Japanese Albums | 182 |
