= Heresy and Creed =

Album by Ten

Studio album by Ten
- Released: October 19, 2012
- Genre: Hard rock
- Length: 69:07
- Label: Frontiers Records; Avalon Records
- Producer: Gary Hughes

Ten chronology
Stormwarning (2011)	Heresy and Creed (2012)	Albion (2014)

Heresy and Creed is the tenth studio album by the English melodic hard rock band Ten. The album was released on 26 September 2012 in Japan and on 19 October in Europe. The official release date for North America was 22 October. It was the first album with the new lead guitarist Dan Mitchell, keyboard player Darrel Treece-Birch and drummer Max Yates. Steve Mckenna also returned to the band, making it his first studio appearance for the band since the double compilation album "The Essential Collection 1995-2005" in 2005.

According to Gary Hughes, the new album "Is a particularly strong selection of material. I feel this is possibly our most mature, and diverse collection of songs ever. There is literally something in there for everyone and every taste".

The cover was illustrated by Felipe Machado Franco, known for his work with Blind Guardian.

In October 2012, Heresy and Creed entered the UK Rock Album Charts at number 30.

== Background ==
"Heresy and Creed" marks a new lineup for Ten, introducing Dan Mitchell on lead guitar, Darrel Treece-Birch on keyboards, and Max Yates on drums, alongside the return of bassist Steve McKenna. According to Gary Hughes, the album represents one of the band's most mature and diverse collections of songs. The recording and production were directed by Hughes, with mixing and mastering handled by Dennis Ward.

== Track listing ==
All songs written by Gary Hughes.

1. The Gates Of Jerusalem (Instrumental) – 1:34
2. Arabian Knights – 6:26
3. Gunrunning – 5:52
4. The Lights Go Down – 6:12
5. Raven's Eye – 5:43
6. Right Now – 5:27
7. Game Of Hearts – 4:20
8. The Last Time – 6:36
9. The Priestess – 5:13
10. Insatiable – 4:06
11. Another Rainy Day – 4:57
12. Unbelievable – 4:07
13. The Riddle – 5:32

The Asian version (Avalon Records MICP-11064) adds:

14. I Found Love – 3:02

== Personnel ==
- Gary Hughes – vocals, guitars, backing vocals
- Dan Mitchell – lead guitars
- John Halliwell – rhythm guitars
- Darrel Treece-Birch – keyboards, programming
- Steve Mckenna – bass guitar
- Max Yates – drums and percussion

== Production ==
- Produced by Gary Hughes
- Mixing and mastering by Dennis Ward

== Concepts ==
The album's opening tracks, "The Gates Of Jerusalem" and "Arabian Knights", are about the Christian knights who were residing in the Holy Lands and about the Siege of Jerusalem, which took place before the Third Crusade.

== Chart positions ==
Chart (2012)	Peak position
UK Rock Albums Charts	30
