= Precious Ones =

Studio album by Gary Hughes
- Released: 1998
- Genre: Hard rock
- Length: 57:53
- Label: Frontiers; FR CD 004
- Producer: Gary Hughes

Gary Hughes chronology
Gary Hughes (1992)	Precious Ones (1998)	In Your Eyes EP (1998)

Gary Hughes compilation chronology
The Reissues (2000)	Decades (2021)

Precious Ones is the third studio album released by Gary Hughes in 1998.

== Track listing ==
All songs written by Gary Hughes.

1. "In Your Eyes" – 5:43
2. "Don't Ever Say Goodbye" – 6:07
3. "The Colours of My Life" – 5:05
4. "Give My Love a Try" – 5:36
5. "Divided We Fall" – 3:44
6. "The Night the Love Died" – 6:03
7. "First Light" (Instrumental) – 0:58
8. "Wrecking Machine" – 5:27
9. "Perfect Ten" – 4:34
10. "This Time" – 4:56
11. "Heart of a Woman" – 5:24
12. "Precious Ones" – 4:16

== Personnel ==
- Gary Hughes – vocals, guitars, keyboards and Bass guitars
- Vinny Burns – guitars
- Greg Morgan – drums
- Andy Thompson – keyboards
- Ralph Santolla – guitars
- Aziz Ibrahim – guitars
- Jason Thanos – backing vocals
- Todd Plant – backing vocals
- Mark Ashton – backing vocals
- Ray Brophy – backing vocals

== Production ==
- Mixing – Ray Brophy
- Engineer – Ray Brophy
- Additional Engineering – Neil Amison and Tim
