= Sirens (book) =

Sirens is a book by Chris Achilleos and Nigel Suckling published in 1986.

== Contents ==
Sirens is the second published collection of art by Chris Achilleos.

== Reception ==
Dave Langford reviewed Sirens for White Dwarf #84, and stated that "A treat for the eye rather than the brain [...] People who like books like this will like this book."
