= The Journey (Vinny Burns album) =

Studio album by Vinny Burns
- Released: 1999
- Genre: Hard rock
- Length: 59:18
- Labels: Frontiers; FR CD 021
- Producer: Vinny Burns

The Journey is the first solo album by Vinny Burns released in 1999.

== Track listing ==
All songs written by Sam Blue and Vinny Burns except where noted.

1. "Irish Eyes" (Vinny Burns) – 1:39
2. "Superstar" – 4:23
3. "Fire Burning" – 5:02
4. "Freedom" – 4:56
5. "This World" (Burns, Gary Hughes) – 6:29
6. "Where You Gonna Run" – 5:57
7. "I Believe" – 4:38
8. "Live the Dream" – 5:29
9. "Lonely Man" – 5:57
10. "Already Gone" (Burns, Hughes) – 5:12
11. "Falling" – 4:27
12. "The Journey" (Burns) – 5:09

== Personnel ==
- Vinny Burns – guitars, bass guitar, keyboards, computer and keyboard programming
- Sam Blue – lead vocals (except tracks 5 & 10)
- Greg Morgan – drums
- Gary Hughes – backing vocals, lead vocals (tracks 5 & 10)
- James SK Wān - saxophone (tracks 5, 7 & 8)
- Colin McLeod – Hammond organ (tracks 3, 4, & 6)
- Craig Fletcher – fretless bass guitar (track 8)

== Production ==
- Mixing – Audu Obaje
- Engineer – Ray Brophy
- Additional Engineering – Audu Obaje and Tim
