= Ten (Ten album) =

X

Studio album by Ten
- Released: May 15, 1996
- Genre: Melodic hard rock
- Length: 62:11
- Labels: Now & Then Records
- Producers: Gary Hughes, Mike Stone

Ten chronology
X (1996)	The Name of the Rose (1996)

X (or Ten) is the debut studio album released by English melodic hard rock band Ten.

== Track listing ==
All songs written by Gary Hughes except where noted.

1. "The Crusades/It's All About Love" – 8:06 (Gary Hughes, Vinny Burns)
2. "After the Love Has Gone" – 5:27
3. "Yesterday Lies In the Flames" – 5:06
4. "The Torch" – 5:25
5. "Stay With Me" – 5:52
6. "Close Your Eyes and Dream" – 6:24
7. "Eyes of a Child" – 5:02
8. "Can't Slow Down" – 5:29
9. "Lamb to the Slaughter" – 4:50
10. "Soliloquy/The Loneliest Place In the World" – 10:30

2015 Japanese SHM-CD remaster (AVALON MICP-11208) bonus track:

11. "Beautiful Miss Understood" - 4:32

== Personnel ==
- Gary Hughes – lead and backing vocals
- Vinny Burns – guitars
- Greg Morgan – drums and percussion
- Mark Harrison – bass guitar
- Lee Goulding – keyboards
- Howard Smith – keyboards
- Andy Thompson – keyboards
- Francis Cummings – first violin
- Peter Leighton-Jones – first violin
- John Wade – first violin
- Fiona Payne – second violin
- Julia Parsons – second violin
- Jean Ambrose – viola
- Anne Morrison – viola
- Anna Frazer – cello

== Production ==
- Executive Producers – Mark Ashton and Vinny Burns
- Mixing – Mike Stone
- Engineer – Mike Stone, Audu Obaje, Ray Brophy, Gavin Fernie and Kirk Podmore
