= Albion (Ten album) =

Studio album by Ten
- Released: November 21, 2014
- Recorded: 2014
- Genre: Hard rock
- Length: 59:07
- Labels: Rocktopia Records, Avalon Records
- Producer: Gary Hughes

Ten chronology
Heresy and Creed (2012)	Albion (2014)	Isla De Muerta (2015)

Professional ratings
Review scores
Source	Rating
AllaroundMetal Webzine	4.5/5 stars
Danger Dog	5/5 stars
Firebrand Magazine	(10/10)
Grande Rock E-Zine	(8/10)
Hard Rock Heaven	(8/10)
Heavy Paradise	(9/10)
MelodicRock.com	(93/100)
Melodicrock.it	(8/10)
Metal Message	(10/10)
Metal Temple	(10/10)
Metal-Only.de	(10/10)
Monkey Castle Rock	(8/10)
Musik An Sich	(16/20)
MyGlobalMind	(10/10)
The Power of Metal	(96/100)
Reviews By Jon	(8.5/10)
Rock Avenue	(9.5/10)
Rock Eyez	4/5 stars
The Rock Pit	4/5 stars
Rock-Garage	(8.5/10)

Albion is the eleventh studio album by English hard rock band Ten. The album was released on 21 November 2014 and derives its name from the name for the collective British Isles from the time of Queen Boadicia. According to the band, the album was another first for Ten with the release of a limited edition double gatefold vinyl album, which included a large number of highly collectable items. The leading singles from the album were the tracks "'Die For Me" and "Alone In The Dark Tonight".

The album cover was illustrated by Gaetano Di Falco, who also illustrated the band's next studio album, Isla De Muerta.

== Track listing ==
All songs written by Gary Hughes.

1. Alone in the Dark Tonight – 4:25
2. Battlefield – 5:00
3. It's Alive – 5:02
4. Albion Born – 5:24
5. Sometimes Love Takes The Long Way Home – 5:14
6. A Smuggler's Tale – 5:57
7. It Ends This Day – 5:37
8. Die For Me – 7:28
9. Gioco D'Amore – 4:59
10. Wild Horses – 5:55

Asian version (Avalon Records MICP-11194) adds

11. Good God in Heaven What Hell Is This – 4:00

== Personnel ==
- Gary Hughes – vocals, guitars, backing vocals
- Dann Rosingana – lead guitars
- Steve Grocott – lead guitars
- John Halliwell – rhythm Guitars
- Darrel Treece-Birch – keyboards, programming
- Steve Mckenna – bass guitar
- Max Yates – drums and percussion

== Production ==
- Produced by Gary Hughes
- Mixing and mastering by Dennis Ward

== Concepts ==
- The song "Alone In The Dark Tonight" is based on Emily Brontë's book Wuthering Heights.
- "A Smuggler's Tale" is based on Daphne Du Maurier's Jamaica Inn (novel).

== Chart positions ==
Year	Chart	Position
2014
2014	Japanese Sales Charts	9
