= Sam Blue =

English hard rock singer (born 1959)

Sam Blue (born Simon Blewitt 1959 in Newcastle upon Tyne, England) (also known as Sam Blewitt) is an English hard rock singer, who has been part of the bands Emerson, Axis, L. A. Secrets, Paul Samson's Empire, Ya Ya, Ultravox, GTS, and Burns Blue. He works in the UK and Europe as a session singer, performing and collaborating with many artists including The Streets, Dizzee Rascal, Braund Reynolds, The Young Punx, Phonat, Urban Myth, Avicci, Otto Knows, Madness. He had Top 40 single in 2006 with Baywatch theme – I'll be Ready (Naughty Boy/Phat Beach) He has also worked an artist manager at Plan C Management with Christian Ulf-Hansen. The company's artists included the singer-songwriter, Tobias Fröberg (Sweden); & Kathryn Williams.

== Career ==
In the 1980s Blue sang with the bands Emerson (one single on Neat Records) LA Secrets, Paul Samson's Empire, and Ya Ya (who released one album on WEA/Warner Bros 1988). In 1993, he was asked to join the new version of Ultravox led by Billy Currie and included Vinny Burns, Tony Holmes and Gary Williams. After standing in for a previous singer on some shows, Blue was asked to join. He co-wrote the Ingenuity album with Currie and Burns. They released one other live album. Blue then collaborated on Vinny Burns solo album 'The Journey'. with Burns and Gary Hughes. The next collaboration with Burns was the Burns Blue album 'What if', with Pete Jupp and Bob Skeat. He entered the UK finals for the Eurovision Song Contest in 1996 (as part of the duo Esseness with the song "I Never Knew") and in 1997 (as a solo artist with the song "For The Life You Don't Yet Know"), both of which involved prime-time performances on BBC One. He had previously made it to the 1990 "Eurovision Song Contest" as a backing vocalist for Emma singing "Give a little love back to the world"

Blue reached the Top 40 in the UK Singles Chart in 2006, with the Phat Beach/Naughty Boy version of the Baywatch theme, "I'll Be Ready". He also sang on the tsunami relief record for Mike Read and producer Steve Levine.

He also worked on the Thomas & Friends franchise, and has sang songs for films such as ”Hero of the Rails” (2009), ”Day of the Diesels” (2011), and "Blue Mountain Mystery" (2012), all the way up to “Sodor’s Legend of the Lost Treasure” (2015). He returned to the franchise in series 24 to record the song “Party Train”.

Blue was a backing vocalist on the theme music for the BBC TV series New Tricks, produced by Dennis Waterman.

He also appeared as Lead & backing vocalist for Dizzee Rascal, both on Later... with Jools Holland & 2009 Hootenany show, also the 2009 BBC Electric Prom's at the Roundhouse London. His work with Dizzee Rascal continued for Festivals (including Glastonbury, Reading & Leeds, Bestival) and concert appearances in 2010 – his vocals are also featured on the song "Fix up Look Sharp".

His other work included singing lead and backing for Phonat and Vanessa Amorosi in June 2010. In 2011, Blue worked as a vocal coach on BBC Introducingand with several artists. He also collaborated with The Bays, who used his pre-recorded vocals for some of their live shows. Other recent appearances include

- Providing lead and backing vocals on Urban Myth cover of "Africa" 2010/11
- Providing lead and backing vocals on Lauren Simeca re-mix of Roxanne in 2010
- Providing lead and backing vocals on the hook of "Get Down" on Amplify Dot 2012 release "Get Down".
- Worked with Madness on the promo of the single 'How Can I Tell You' as backing singer in 2013.
- Providing lead and backing vocals from Otto Knows on the single 'Million Voices'.
- Providing backing vocals on Avicii's 'Fade into Darkness'.

in 2014 Blue sang at the Rock n Horsepower Festival with Kenney Jones & Friends at Hurtwood Park, Surrey for Prostate Cancer UK awareness. He described singing the Small Faces songs with the band as an honour. He also sang 'Nights in White satin' with John Lodge of the Moody Blues. Also on the bill were The Who, Jeff Beck, Alvin Stardust, John Parr, Nick Kershaw, Mick Hucknall among others. The event is due to be repeated in 2015 after it raised a considerable amount for the charity.

Blue still sings with his band California Screaming, which he formed with longtime friend and guitarist James Nisbet. Band members include Alex Toff/Andy Treacy on Drums, Carl Holt/Joe Holweger on Bass, Anthony Clark/ Mike Bramwell on Keys, Mim Grey/Nadie Keating on vocals.

== Discography ==
=== Emerson ===
- Something Special b/w Stars in Hollywood (1983)

=== Ya Ya ===
- II (1988)

=== Paul Samson's Empire ===
- Live at the Marquee (1994) - credited as Sam Blue
- Samson - The BBC Sessions (1997) - credited as Sam Bluitt

=== Ultravox ===
- Ingenuity (1994)
- Future Picture (1995, live album)

=== GTS ===
- Tracks From The Dustshelf (1995)
- "Time Stood Still" (1996)

=== Vinny Burns ===
- The Journey (1999)

=== Burns Blue ===
- What If... (2003)

=== Guest appearances ===
Artist	Album / Single	Year
Montserrat Caballe	Friends for Life	1998
Phoenix Down	Under a Wild Sky	1999
Various Artists	Familiar Faces: A Tribute to Rod Stewart & the Faces	2000
The Streets	A Grand Don't Come for Free	2004
Billy Currie	Pieces of the Puzzle	2004
Phat Beach	"I'll Be Ready" (Baywatch Theme)	2006
Young Punx	"Your Music is Killing Me"	2007
Phonat	"Set Me Free", "Get Down My Dirty Street", "Warm Welcome" and "Learn to Recycle"	2009
Dizzee Rascal	Tongue n' Cheek – Deluxe Edition (live from the BBC Electric Proms) on "Fix Up Look Sharp" and "Brand New Day"	2010
Lauren Simeca	Roxanne re-mix	2010
Urban Myth	Africa	2010/11
Amplify Dot	"Get Down"	2012
