= The Dragon and Saint George =

The Dragon And Saint George

EP by Ten
- Released: September 4, 2015
- Genre: Hard rock
- Length: 31:38
- Label: Rocktopia Records; 004RTP
- Producer: Gary Hughes

Ten chronology
Isla De Muerta (2015)	The Dragon And Saint George (2015)	Gothica (2017)

Ten EP chronology
Fear the Force (1999)	The Dragon And Saint George (2015)

The Dragon and Saint George is the fifth EP by English melodic hard rock band Ten, released on September 4, 2015. As with the previous two albums, the cover of the EP was illustrated by Gaetano Di Falco. It is the first EP release for the band since 1999's Fear the Force and also the first to be released in 12-inch format.

== Track listing ==
All songs written by Gary Hughes.

1. "The Dragon And Saint George" – 5:16
2. "Musketeers: Soldiers Of The King" – 4:07
3. "Is There Anyone With Sense" – 5:15
4. "The Prodigal Saviour" – 4:12
5. "Albion Born" – 5:24
6. "Good God In Heaven What Hell Is This" – 4:00 (12 inch Picture Disc exclusive)
7. "We Can Be As One" (European Exclusive track to Isla De Muerta – 3:28
- The tracks "Musketeers: Soldiers Of The King", "The Prodigal Saviour" and "Is There Anyone With Sense" are previously unreleased.

== Personnel ==
- Gary Hughes – vocals, guitars, backing vocals
- Dann Rosingana – Lead guitars
- Steve Grocott – Lead guitars
- John Halliwell – Rhythm Guitars
- Darrel Treece-Birch – keyboards, Programming
- Steve Mckenna – Bass guitar
- Max Yates – drums and percussion

== Production ==
- Written and produced by Gary Hughes
- Mixing and Mastering by Dennis Ward
