= Here Be Monsters (Ten album) =

Studio album by Ten
- Released: 18 February 2022
- Genre: Hard rock
- Length: 60:18
- Label: Frontiers (FR CD 1192)
- Producer: Gary Hughes

Ten chronology
Opera Omnia (2019)	Here Be Monsters (2022)	Something Wicked This Way Comes (2023)

Here Be Monsters is the fifteenth studio album by the English melodic hard rock band Ten. The first single from the album, the track "Fearless", was released on 6 December 2021, while the second one, "Hurricane", was released on 12 January 2022.

== Track listing ==
All songs written by Gary Hughes.

1. "Fearless" – 6:53
2. "Chapter and Psalm" – 8:18
3. "Hurricane" – 4:35
4. "Strangers on a Distant Shore" – 6:07
5. "The Dream That Fell to Earth" – 6:25
6. "The Miracle of Life" – 5:48
7. "Anything You Want" – 4:47
8. "Immaculate Friends" – 5:19
9. "Follow Me into the Fire" – 7:11
10. "The Longest Time" – 4:55

== Personnel ==
=== Ten ===
- Gary Hughes – vocals, guitars, backing vocals
- Dann Rosingana – lead guitars
- Steve Grocott – lead guitars
- Darrel Treece-Birch – keyboards, programming
- Steve Mckenna – bass guitar
- Markus Kullman – drums and percussion

=== Production ===
- Gary Hughes – production

== Charts ==
Chart performance for Here Be Monsters
Chart (2022)	Peak position
UK Independent Albums (OCC)	40
UK Rock & Metal Albums (OCC)	14
