= Dead Men Do Tell Tales =

Dead Men Do Tell Tales may refer to:

- Dead Men Do Tell Tales (book), a 1994 book by William R. Maples
- "Dead Men Do Tell Tales", a 2006 episode of Heartbeat
- "Dead Men Do Tell Tales", a 1982 episode of Minder
