= Paul Hodson =

British keyboardist

- Origin: England
- Genres: Rock, melodic rock, hard rock, progressive rock
- Occupation(s): Musician, songwriter, record producer
- Instrument: Keyboards

Paul Hodson is an English rock musician. He was the keyboard player of the band Ten from 2001 until September 2011. He has also played for the band Hard Rain since 1997 as well as for his solo project, named Hodson, under which he released his first (and only at the moment) album in 2004, named This Strange World. In 2003, he wrote (and played keyboards) for Bob Catley's solo album When Empires Burn. Apart from being a songwriter and a keyboard player, he also produces music for other artists.

== Personal life ==
Hodson lectures at Staffordshire University, teaching music technology and offers students a balanced view of the music industry from his diverse tastes.

== Discography ==
=== Ten ===
- Far Beyond the World (2001)
- Return to Evermore (2004)
- The Essential Collection 1995–2005 (2005)
- The Twilight Chronicles (2006)
- Stormwarning (2011)

=== Hard Rain ===
- Hard Rain (1997)
- When the Good Times Come (1999)

=== Hodson ===
- This Strange World (2004), with Vince O'Reagan and Lynch Radinsky
