= The Best of Ten 1996–1999 =

The Best of Ten 1996-1999

Compilation album by Ten
- Released: November 26, 1999
- Genre: Hard rock
- Length: 149:04
- Label: Mercury Records; PHCR-90055/6
- Producer: Gary Hughes

Ten chronology
| Spellbound (1999) | The Best of Ten 1996-1999 (1999) | Babylon (2000) |

Professional ratings
Review scores
| Source | Rating |
|---|---|
| Allmusic | (no review) |

The Best of Ten 1996–1999 is the first compilation album released by English hard rock band Ten, which consists of tracks taken from their first four albums. The double compact disc was officially released only in Asian markets.

== Track listing ==
All songs written by Gary Hughes except where noted.

=== Disc one ===
1. "The Name of the Rose" – 8:33
2. "After the Love Has Gone" – 5:26
3. "We Rule the Night" – 5:28
4. "Standing on the Edge of Time" – 5:01 (Hughes, Vinny Burns)
5. "Red" – 4:19
6. "Virtual Reality" – 5:48
7. "The Torch" – 5:23
8. "Goodnight Saigon" – 7:05
9. "Through the Fire" – 8:14
10. "Arcadia" – 7:33
11. "Stay With Me" – 5:50
12. "The Loneliest Place in the World" – 10:28

=== Disc two ===
1. "March of the Argonauts" (Instrumental) – 2:16
2. "Fear the Force" – 5:35
3. "Don't Cry – 4:58
4. "Lamb to the Slaughter" – 4:48
5. "Yesterday Lies in the Flames" – 5:03
6. "The Robe" – 9:04
7. "Bright on the Blade" – 4:49
8. "The Alchemist" – 5:08
9. "You're in My Heart" – 6:31
10. "The Rainbow" – 6:02 (Hughes, Zoe Hughes)
11. "Spellbound" – 5:14
12. "Wait for You" – 5:31
13. "Till the End of Time" – 4:57

== Personnel ==
- Gary Hughes – vocals
- Vinny Burns – Lead guitars
- John Halliwell – Rhythm guitars
- Steve McKenna – bass guitar
- Ged Rylands – keyboards
- Greg Morgan – drums

== Production ==
- Mixing – Mike Stone
- Mixing – Rafe McKenna
