= Babylon (Ten album) =

Studio album by Ten
- Released: August 28, 2000
- Genre: Hard rock
- Length: 58:36
- Label: Frontiers Records
- Producer: Gary Hughes

Ten chronology
The Best of Ten 1996–1999 (1999)	Babylon (2000)	Far Beyond the World (2001)

Professional ratings
Review scores
Source	Rating
AllMusic	

Babylon is the fifth studio album released by English hard rock band Ten.

== Track listing ==
All songs written by Gary Hughes.

1. "The Stranger" – 7:20
2. "Barricade" – 5:22
3. "Give In This Time" – 5:24
4. "Love Became The Law" – 4:41
5. "The Heat" – 5:41
6. "Silent Rain" – 6:27
7. "Timeless" – 4:54
8. "Black Hearted Woman" – 5:35
9. "Thunder In Heaven" – 6:58
10. "Valentine" – 6:14

2016 Japanese SHM-CD remaster (AVALON MICP-11298) track list:

1. "The Stranger"
2. "Barricade"
3. "Give In This Time"
4. "Dawn Star" (bonus track) - 6:07
5. "Love Became The Law"
6. "The Heat"
7. "Silent Rain"
8. "Timeless"
9. "Black Hearted Woman"
10. "Thunder In Heaven"
11. "Valentine"

== Personnel ==
- Gary Hughes – vocals
- Vinny Burns – Lead guitars
- John Halliwell – Rhythm guitars
- Steve McKenna – bass guitar
- Greg Morgan – drums
- Don Airey – keyboards
- Gavin Fernie – the voice of Meridian
- Georgina Rudden – the voice at Cryotech and Lex's computer

== Production ==
- Mixing – Audu Obaje
- Engineers – Audu Obaje, Neil Amison, Kirk Podmore, Vinny Burns and Gary Hughes

== Chart positions ==
=== Album ===
Year	Chart	Position
2000
2000	German Albums Chart	100
