= Vinny Burns =

British guitarist

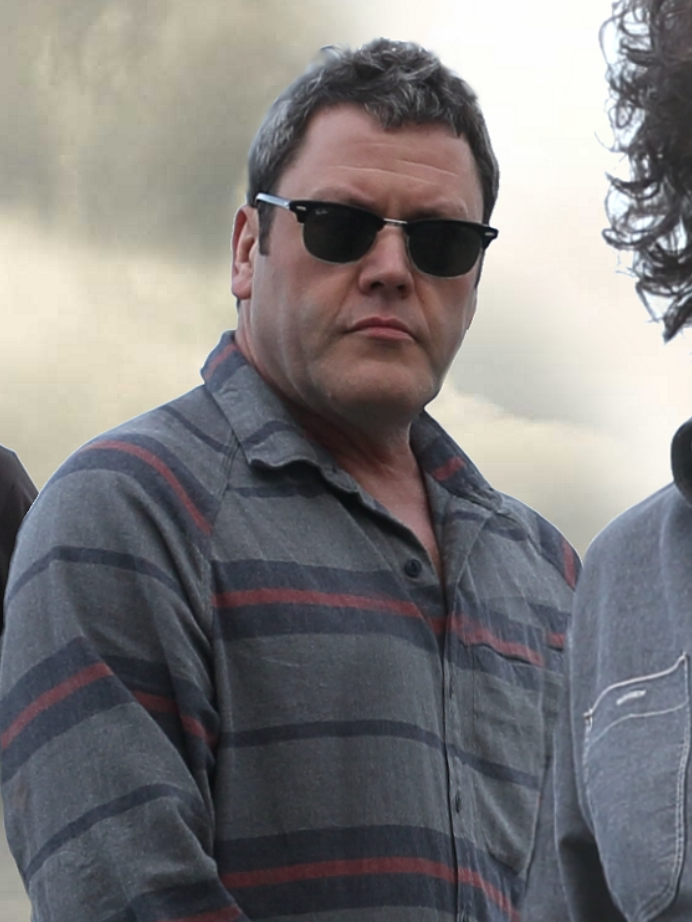
- Burns in 2020

Background information
- Born: 4 April 1965 (age 60); Oldham, Lancashire, England
- Genres: Hard rock, melodic rock
- Occupations: Musician, songwriter, producer
- Instrument: Guitar
- Years active: 1983–present

Vinny Burns (born 4 April 1965) is an English hard rock guitarist and producer, best known for his work with the bands Dare, Ten and Bob Catley. He has also been a member of Asia, Ultravox, Hugo, FM, The Ladder, Phoenix Down, and on his own project with Sam Blue, Burns Blue. He is active as a producer and owns his one recording studio ("The Viper Room"). The last album he produced was the debut album of the rock band The Beautiful Sleazy, "All Fired Up".

== Biography ==
=== Early years ===
Burns started guitar around the age of 9. Inspired by bands like Nazareth, Lynyrd Skynyrd, UFO, Rush, Thin Lizzy and Van Halen he soon was involved in various bands. In 1983, Vinny Burns was approached by the owner of Pennine Studios and it wasn't long before he got his first session job. Alongside his session work at Pennine Studios, he had been active in the live circuit playing in various local bands.

=== The Dare Years: 1985–1992 ===
In 1985, he met Darren Wharton who had just left Thin Lizzy and was looking for a guitarist to form a band. Soon after, they started working on demos of songs that actually ended up in the band's first album. The band was complete when they acquired the services of bass player Martin "Shelley" Shelton, drummer Ed Stratton (followed by Jim Ross) and keyboard player Mark Simpson (who was soon succeeded by Brian Cox). After gigging for almost a year, they started working on new songs and by 1987 they were signed by A&M Records. The band's first album Out of the Silence was released in late 1988 and proved to be a commercial success. Two years later, they released their second album Blood From Stone. By 1992 Burns had left the band and soon after he joined the band Asia.

=== The TEN Years: 1995–2001 ===
Burns first met Gary Hughes when he still was in Dare but only got to work with him in 1994. He was brought in to lay the guitar parts on what was to be Gary Hughes's third and fourth solo albums. During the recordings of the albums, they decided to turn the project into a band. Thus, the band Ten was formed. Together they released six studio albums, four EPs and one live album. Vinny Burns has also appeared in Gary Hughes' third solo album (Precious Ones), on the three Gary Hughes penned Bob Catley solo albums and on the first Hugo Valenti album that again was produced by Gary Hughes. In late 2001. Burns left Ten citing creative differences.

=== Solo work and Burns Blue ===
In 1999, Burns released his first solo album named The Journey, which was also the first Vinny Burns release to feature Sam Blue on vocals. The collaboration with Blue continued after Burns left Ten when, in 2003 they formed the band Burns Blue and released the album What If....

=== Return to Dare ===
In 2008, Burns again joined Darren Wharton in Dare.

=== Other projects ===
Burns has also appeared on other projects like Steve Overland's The Ladder and Shining Line. He was also featured on the first Ged Rylands solo album named "Dreamworld", which was released in March 2013 through Escape Music.

== Discography ==
=== With Dare ===
- Out of the Silence (1988)
- Blood From Stone (1990)
- Sacred Ground (2016)
- Out of the Silence II (2018)
- Road to Eden (2022)

=== With Ultravox ===
- Ingenuity (1994)

=== With Ten ===
Studio albums and EPs

- X (1996)
- The Name of the Rose (1996)
- The Name of the Rose EP (1996)
- The Robe (1997)
- The Robe EP (1997)
- You're in My Heart EP (1997)
- Spellbound (1999)
- Fear the Force EP (1999)
- Babylon (2000)
- Far Beyond the World (2001)

Live albums

- Never Say Goodbye (1998)

Compilation albums

- Ten/The Name of the Rose (1999)
- The Robe/Bonus Collection (1999)
- The Best of Ten 1996–1999 (1999)

=== With Hugo ===
- Hugo (1997)

=== With Bob Catley ===
- The Tower (1998)
- Live at the Gods (1999)
- Legends (1999)
- Middle Earth (2001)

=== Solo ===
- The Journey (1999)

=== Burns Blue ===
- What If... (2003)

=== With The Ladder ===
- Future Miracles (2004)

=== With Three Lions ===
- Three Lions (2014)
