= Isla de Muerta (album) =

Studio album by Ten
- Released: May 20, 2015
- Genre: Hard rock
- Length: 56:47
- Labels: Rocktopia Records 003RTP; Avalon Records MICP-11210
- Producer: Gary Hughes

Ten chronology
Albion (2014)	Isla de Muerta (2015)	The Dragon And Saint George (2015)

Professional ratings
Review scores
Source	Rating
AOR Land	(88/100)
Danger Dog Music Reviews	)
Hard Rock & AOR	(88/100)
Hard Rock Heaven.net	(9/10)
Heavy Paradise	(9/10)
Melodicrock.com	(92/100)
Melodicrock.it	(8.5/10)
Myglobalmind.com	(9/10)
Powermetal.de	(8/10)
Radio Barbarossa	5/5 stars
Rock & Prog	(9/10)
Rock And Metal Essence	(88/100)
Speakers Magazine	(84/100)
Stormbringer.at	4/5 stars
Via Nocturna	5.7 stars on a 6-point scale

Isla de Muerta is the twelfth studio album by the English melodic hard rock band Ten, released on 20 May 2015 by Rocktopia Records. The album is named after the mythical "Island of the Dead" from pirate legend. The album's cover was illustrated by Gaetano Di Falco. The band has released two singles (and lyric videos) from the album, for "Tell Me What to Do" and "This Love".

The album cover was illustrated by Gaetano Di Falco, who also illustrated the cover of the band's previous studio album Albion.

== Track listing ==
All songs written by Gary Hughes.

European version (Rocktopia Records 003RTP)

1. (i) Buccaneers (Instrumental) / (ii) Dead Men Tell No Tales – 6:27
2. Tell Me What to Do – 4:15
3. Acquiesce – 4:45
4. This Love – 4:42
5. The Dragon and Saint George – 5:16
6. Intensify – 6:39
7. (i) Karnak (Instrumental) / (ii) The Valley of the Kings – 8:10
8. Revolution – 5:56
9. Angel of Darkness – 3:57
10. The Last Pretender – 6:40
11. We Can Be As One – 3:28 (European version bonus track)

Asian version (Avalon Records MICP-11210)

1. (i) Buccaneers (Instrumental) / (ii) Dead Men Tell No Tales – 6:27
2. Revolution – 5:56
3. Acquiesce – 4:45
4. The Dragon and Saint George – 5:16
5. Intensify – 6:39
6. This Love – 4:42
7. (i) Karnak (Instrumental) / (ii) The Valley of the Kings – 8:10
8. Tell Me What to Do – 4:15
9. Angel of Darkness – 3:57
10. The Last Pretender – 6:40
11. Assault And Battery – 4:52 (Japanese version bonus track)

== Personnel ==
- Gary Hughes – vocals, guitars, backing vocals
- Dann Rosingana – lead guitars
- Steve Grocott – lead guitars
- John Halliwell – rhythm guitars
- Darrel Treece-Birch – keyboards, programming
- Steve Mckenna – bass guitar
- Max Yates – drums and percussion

== Production ==
- Written and produced by Gary Hughes
- Mixing and mastering by Dennis Ward

== Concepts ==
- The song "The Dragon and Saint George" is based on the legend of Saint George who slayed the dragon and saved the city of Silene.
- "Revolution" is a recounting of the story of the French Revolution.
- "Karnak/The Valley of the Kings" is a song about the Curse of the pharaohs during the discovery of the tomb of Tutankhamun in The Valley of the Kings.

== Chart positions ==
Year	Chart	Position
2015
2015	Oricon Japanese Albums Charts	131
