= The Robe (album) =

Studio album by Ten
- Released: September 29, 1997
- Genre: Hard rock
- Length: 65:38
- Labels: MTM Records; MTM 199635
- Producer: Gary Hughes

Ten chronology
| The Name of the Rose (1996) | The Robe (1997) | Never Say Goodbye (1998) |

Professional ratings
Review scores
| Source | Rating |
|---|---|
| Allmusic | link |

The Robe is the third studio album released by English hard rock band Ten. It was the third and last album produced by Mike Stone.

The Robe / Bonus Collection containing 2 discs and 23 songs was released in 1999.

== Track listing ==
All songs written by Gary Hughes except where noted.

1. "The Robe" – 9:04
2. "Bright On the Blade" – 4:51
3. "Standing On the Edge of Time" – 5:03 (Gary Hughes, Vinny Burns)
4. "Virtual Reality" – 5:49
5. "Arcadia" – 7:34
6. "Battlelines" – 4:18
7. "You're In My Heart" – 6:38
8. "Fly Like an Eagle" – 7:13
9. "Ten Fathoms Deep" – 7:10
10. "Someday" – 7:58 (Gary Hughes, Vinny Burns)

2016 Japanese SHM-CD remaster (AVALON MICP-11296) bonus track:

11. "If Only For A Day" - 8:12

== Personnel ==
- Gary Hughes – vocals and programming
- Vinny Burns – Lead guitars and programming
- John Halliwell – Rhythm guitars
- Ged Rylands – keyboards
- Greg Morgan – drums and percussion
- Andrew Webb – bass guitar
- Jason Thanos – backing vocals
- Ray Brophy – backing vocals and programming
- Ed Collins – trumpet and flugelhorn
- Dru Baker – tenor and alto saxophone
- Dave Chadwick – Voiceovers

== Production ==
- Mixing – Mike Stone
- Engineer – Ray Brophy
- Additional Engineering – Audu Obaje, Tim Baxter and Royston Hollyer

== Concepts ==
- The song "The Robe" depicts the quest of the escaping Christian Knights after the siege of Jerusalem, who were trying to find a safe hiding place for the robe used to wrap Christ's body following the Crucifixion. The Robe is also a novel about the Crucifixion written by Lloyd C. Douglas, from which several concepts and ideas were used.
