= Ten (band) =

English hard rock band

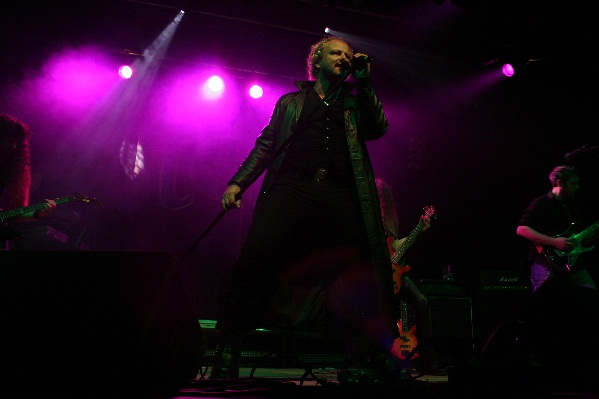
- Ten at Fleetwoodstock Festival 2011

Background information
- Origin: Manchester, England
- Genres: Hard rock, AOR
- Years active: 1995–2007; 2011–present
- Labels: Frontiers; Rocktopia; Now and Then; Avalon; Mercury
- Members: Gary Hughes; Dann Rosingana; Steve Grocott; Darrel Treece-Birch; Craig Martin Walker
- Past members: Martin "Shelley" Shelton; Andrew "Drew" Webb; Ged Rylands; Don Airey; Vinny Burns; Greg Morgan; Lee Morris; Frank Basile; Chris Francis; Mark Zonder; Paul Hodson; Neil Fraser; Mark Sumner; Dan Mitchell; John Halliwell; Max Yates
- Website: tenofficial.com

Ten (also stylised as TEN or ten) are an English melodic hard rock band which were formed in 1995. The band has released 16 studio albums, 6 compilation albums, 5 EPs, a double live album, 10 music videos and 4 lyric videos, with the latest one being "The Tidal Wave", from their 2023 studio album Something Wicked This Way Comes. The band charted at in the United Kingdom with 2012's Heresy and Creed, 2017's Gothica, 2018's Illuminati and 2022's Here Be Monsters but AllMusic describes their 1999 album Spellbound as their most successful.

== History ==
=== Formation (1994–1996) ===
Following the release of his first two solo albums, British vocalist-songwriter Gary Hughes wrote 28 songs, and decided to divide them into two albums – one containing the heavier material, and one that would contain the ballads. Additionally, the initial idea was to mix the album in the US, so American guitarists were considered, including Doug Aldrich, Lanny Cordola and Ralph Santolla. However, when it was decided to lay down the guitar parts in England, the name of the guitarist Vinny Burns (Dare, Ultravox) was brought up. Given the fact that Mike Stone was assigned to mix the albums, the project quickly evolved into a band situation, thus marking the first official incarnation of Ten. During the first year of the band's existence, another ex-Dare member joined the band when Greg Morgan was brought in as drummer.

=== Early years (1996–2001) ===
The band's first album (named X) was released in May 1996. In order to support the album for the forthcoming tour, the band recruited bassist Martin "Shelley" Shelton (ex-Dare), keyboard player Ged Rylands (ex-KAGE) and guitarist John Halliwell (ex-KAGE). With the songs already written, the band returned to the studio in order to finish their second album. The Name of the Rose was released in September of the same year (1996), gaining some enthusiastic reviews from the critics. The title track was also voted "Song of the Year" by the readers of BURRN! magazine in Japan.

The first tour was arranged for the end of 1996. Bassist Martin "Shelley" Shelton left the band and was replaced by Andrew "Drew" Webb. After a successful tour, Ten returned to the studio without Webb in order to record their next album. The mixing duties again were appointed to Stone, and The Robe was released in September 1997. The Robe marked a change in the overall sound of Ten, which was now melodic hard rock combined with epic atmospheres and influences. With the addition of bassist Steve Mckenna, the band toured for a year, in support of their newly released album, while in 1998 the band's Japanese label ZERO Records and the European label Frontiers Records released a double live album named Never Say Goodbye.

The band signed to major label Mercury Records for the release of their fourth studio album, Spellbound. The album was released in April 1999, was produced by Rafe Mckenna and was one of the most successful Ten albums in Europe. Spellbound was also the first Ten album for which famous fantasy artist Luis Royo designed the cover.

In 1999, the band returned to the studio in order to begin the recordings of their next album. Babylon, which was released in August 2000 and featured keyboard player Don Airey, was a concept album which was set in the future and was based around the story of a computer programmer and his tragic love affair. Babylon entered the German Rock Album Charts.

Soon after, the band returned to the studio to record the follow-up album to Babylon, named Far Beyond the World. The recordings took place in Hannover, Germany, with Tommy Newton behind the mixing desk and ex–Hard Rain keyboard player Paul Hodson taking the place of Don Airey. In December 2001, Ten released Far Beyond the World; but just before the promotion of the new album had begun, guitarist Vinny Burns announced his departure from the band, citing creative differences.

=== Return to Evermore and hiatus (2002–2007) ===
The band held auditions for the position of the lead guitarist, and in January 2002 announced Chris Francis as Vinny Burns' replacement. During 2002 and 2003, the band took a break since Gary Hughes and the rest of the band had been working on Hughes' two-part rock opera project named Once and Future King.

Ten released Return to Evermore in 2004 initially through Gary Hughes' own record label Intensity Records, while in 2005 the band announced that they would release a double disk Best Of collection, The Essential Collection 1995–2005, in order to celebrate the band's tenth anniversary. The compilation featured newly recorded versions of the songs, which were divided into two disks – one containing the ballads and one the heavier material.

In addition to The Essential Collection, the band announced the release of The Twilight Chronicles in August 2006, which featured another change in the sound of the band, leaning towards a more symphonic sound. By then, the band consisted of Hughes, Chris Francis, John Halliwell, Paul Hodson and session drummer Frank Basile, since bassist Steve Mckenna had left the band in December 2005. By 2007, Ten was put on a hiatus and by May 2008, lead guitarist Chris Francis had announced his departure from the band.

=== Re-emergence and Isla De Muerta (2010–2015) ===
Following a four-year hiatus, the band returned with Stormwarning in early 2011. The album featured members Gary Hughes, John Halliwell, Paul Hodson and session musicians Neil Fraser on lead guitar, Mark Sumner on bass and Mark Zonder (Fates Warning) on drums and was produced by Dennis Ward. A month later, an unreleased song from the Babylon sessions named "Dawn Star" appeared, as part of the AhORa Rock podcast of the Rocktopia music site. Originally, "Dawn Star" was meant to be included on the Babylon album, but was removed from it just three weeks prior to its final release. In January 2011, it was announced that the band would also be filming a video for the new album, with Devin Dehaven as the director. "Endless Symphony" was the highest budget video to date for the band and it was released just a month after. Stormwarning on the other hand, was released a month later, in February 2011.

In September 2011, Paul Hodson announced his departure from the band on a Ten group on Facebook. On 5 November 2011, on their Fleetwoodstock charity gig, their very first live appearance since the band's reemergence, the band featured for the first time in a live setting, the new (at the time) lead guitarist Dan Mitchell and keyboard player Darrel Treece-Birch, alongside bassist Steve Mckenna, who, since August of the same year, had returned to the band. In May 2012, the band did a UK tour, supported by the bands Serpentine and White Widdow. The band also appeared for the first time, on Firefest on 19 October of the same year alongside bands Tyketto, Dante Fox and Lionville.

The band's tenth studio album entitled Heresy and Creed, was released on 26 September 2012 in Japan, 19 October in Europe and 22 October in North America. The leading single off the album was the track "Gunrunning", the video clip of which was again directed by Devin Dehaven. The album's success culminated into its entry to the UK rock album charts on the 30th position for October 2012. Some months later, in March 2013, the band performed in Athens, Greece, for the first time, while in August of the same year, a day after the band's appearance on Vasby Rock Festival (on which Serpentine lead guitarist Chris Gould filled in for him), the band announced that lead guitarist Dan Mitchell left the band due to health problems related to his wrist and arm.

A few weeks before the release of their eleventh studio album Albion, the band unveiled their new line-up on Firefest 2014 – The Final Fling, featuring the band's current two lead guitarists, Dann Rosingana and Steve Grocott. The band appeared for the second time in their history in Athens, Greece on 9 May 2015, before they released their 12th studio album, entitled Isla De Muerta on 20 May via Rocktopia Records. About a month later, the band headlined the second night at Wildfire Festival in Scotland.

In September of the same year, the band also released their first EP in 16 years entitled The Dragon and Saint George, which included three brand new tracks, alongside "Albion Born" and the European exclusive track "We Can Be As One", the last two originally present on the band's latest two studio albums, Albion and Isla De Muerta.

=== Return to Frontiers Records (2016–present) ===
In March 2016, the band announced their return to Frontiers Records, for a multi-album deal, starting with the release of their thirteenth studio album Gothica in July 2017 and the re-issue of their entire back catalogue in both physical (box set) and digital format under the title Opera Omnia. As with the band's last four releases, the band's thirteenth album Gothica, was mixed and mastered by Dennis Ward. In November 2018, the band released their fourteenth studio album entitled Illuminati, while in April 2019, the band released their long-awaited compilation box-set entitled Opera Omnia. The box-set included every album released by the band since its inception back in 1995, up until Illuminati. In December 2021, the band announced that they're working on two new studio albums, with the first one entitled Here Be Monsters, to be released on 18 February 2022. The band released their sixteenth studio album entitled Something Wicked This Way Comes, on 20 January 2023. In spring 2024, the band embarked on their "Wicked" UK Tour while currently working on their 17th studio release, due for release in 2025.

Following the release of their sixteenth studio album, TEN embarked on their T-30 UK Anniversary Tour in 2025, celebrating 30 years since the band's formation. The tour included ten dates across the UK and featured various support acts. The Heavy rock band The Reminisce provided support on all dates. Other support acts featured throughout the tour included Rhabstallion, Fury and Catalyst Symphony.

== Current members ==
- Gary Hughes – lead and backing vocals, programming, guitars
- Dann Rosingana – lead guitar
- Steve Grocott – lead guitar
- Darrel Treece-Birch – keyboards
- Steve Mckenna – bass
- Craig Walker – drums

=== Timeline ===
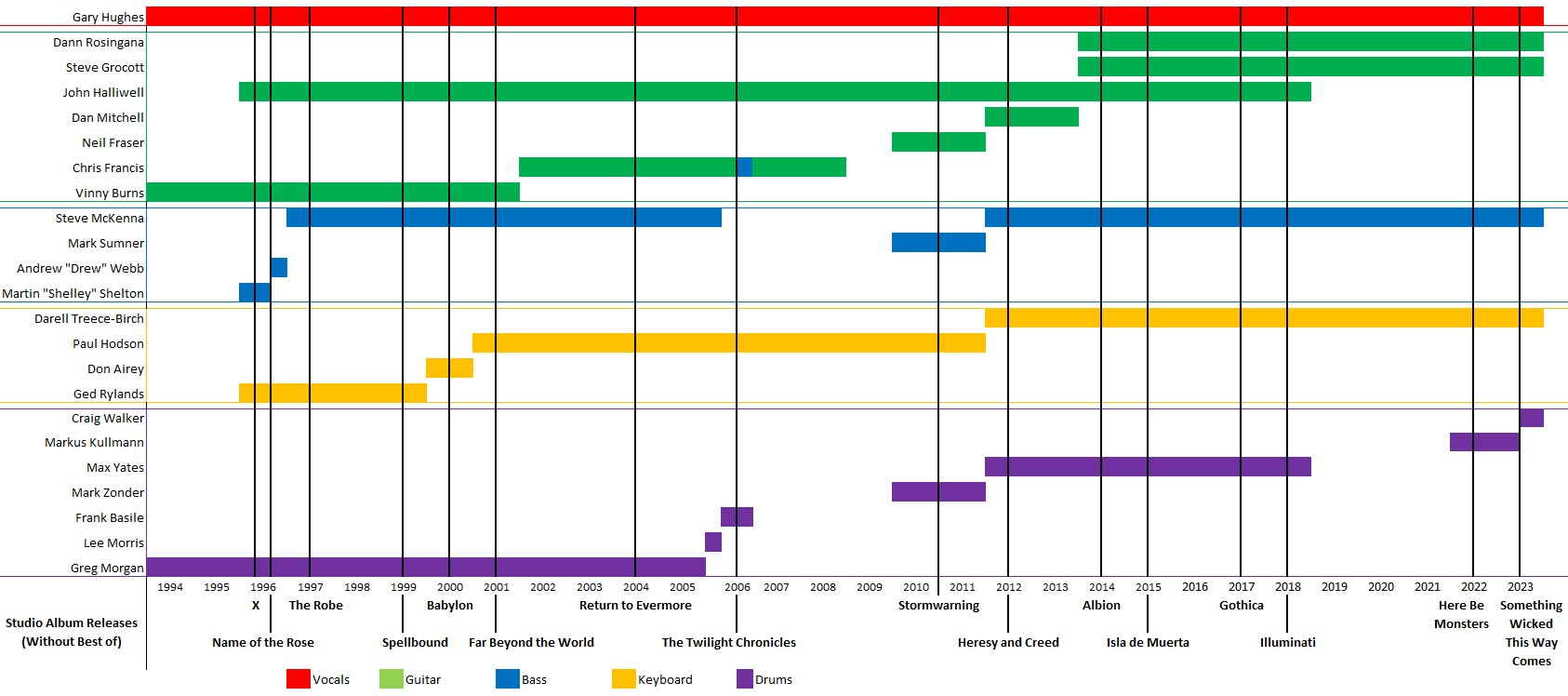
- Visual timeline of band members

== Discography ==
=== Studio albums ===
- X (1996)
- The Name of the Rose (1996)
- The Robe (1997)
- Spellbound (1999)
- Babylon (2000)
- Far Beyond the World (2001)
- Return to Evermore (2004)
- The Twilight Chronicles (2006)
- Stormwarning (2011)
- Heresy and Creed (2012)
- Albion (2014)
- Isla De Muerta (2015)
- Gothica (2017)
- Illuminati (2018)
- Here Be Monsters (2022)
- Something Wicked This Way Comes (2023)

=== Live albums ===
- Never Say Goodbye (1998)

=== Compilation albums ===
- The Best of Ten 1996–1999 (1999)
- X/The Name of the Rose (1999)
- The Robe/Bonus Collection (1999)
- The Essential Collection 1995–2005 (2006)
- Battlefield – The Rocktopia Records Collection – limited release double CD collection (2016)
- Opera Omnia: The Complete Works (2019)

=== EPs ===
- The Name of the Rose (1996)
- The Robe (1997)
- You're In My Heart (1997)
- Fear the Force (1999)
- The Dragon And Saint George (2015)
