= The Name of the Rose (album) =

Studio album by Ten
- Released: September 16, 1996
- Genre: Hard rock
- Length: 77:45
- Labels: Now & Then Records
- Producers: Gary Hughes, Mike Stone

Ten chronology
X (1996)	The Name of the Rose (1996)	The Robe (1997)

Professional ratings
Review scores
Source	Rating
AllMusic	link

The Name of the Rose is the second studio album released by English melodic hard rock band Ten. The album was released only four months apart from the band's first album X, since the songs were already written and recorded.

== Track listing ==
All songs written by Gary Hughes except where noted.

1. "The Name of the Rose" – 8:31
2. "Wildest Dreams" – 5:33
3. "Don't Cry" – 5:00
4. "Turn Around" – 3:52
5. "Pharaoh's Prelude: Ascension to the Afterlife" – 3:54
6. "Wait For You" – 5:31
7. "The Rainbow" – 6:03 (Gary Hughes, Zoe Hughes)
8. "Through the Fire" – 8:19
9. "Goodnight Saigon" – 7:02
10. "Wings of the Storm" – 5:02
11. "Standing In Your Light" – 7:18

Bonus Tracks Release Europe:

12. "The Quest" – 4:52
13. "You're My Religion" – 6:48

2015 Japanese SHM-CD remaster (AVALON MICP-11209) bonus tracks:

12. "The Quest" - 4:52
13. "Round & Round" - 5:27

== Personnel ==
- Gary Hughes – vocals
- Vinny Burns – Lead guitars
- John Halliwell – Rhythm guitars
- Ged Rylands – keyboards
- Martin "Shelley" Shelton – bass guitar
- Greg Morgan – drums
- Mark Harrison – bass guitar
- Brian Cox (physicist) – keyboards
- Howard Smith – keyboards
- Andy Thompson – keyboards
- Jason Thanos – backing vocals (Track 9)
- Oliver Bowden – backing vocals (Track 11)
- Thierey Cardinet – backing vocals (Track 11)
- Damien Guasp – backing vocals (Track 11)
- Jee Jacquet – backing vocals (Track 11)

== Production ==
- Executive Producers – Mark Ashton and Vinny Burns
- Mixing – Mike Stone
- Engineer – Mike Stone, Audu Obaje and Ray Brophy

== Concepts ==
- "Wildest Dreams" is about a utopic perfect woman.
- "Pharaoh's Prelude" and "Wait for You" are based on Egyptian Mythology.
- "The Rainbow" tells the story of a socialite that commits suicide.
- "Goodnight Saigon" is about the Vietnam War.
