= The Reissues =

Compilation album by Gary Hughes
- Released: 2000
- Genre: Hard rock
- Length: 133:23
- Label: Universal Records; PHCR 14025/6
- Producer: Gary Hughes, Simon Humphrey

Gary Hughes chronology
Precious Ones (1998)	The Reissues (2000)	Once and Future King Part I (2003)

Gary Hughes compilation chronology
The Reissues (2000)	Decades (2021)

The Reissues is the first compilation album released by Gary Hughes. The double compact disc contains the second and third Gary Hughes albums plus the bonus tracks as noted below. The album was officially released only in Asian markets.

== Track listing ==
All songs written by Gary Hughes.

=== Disc one-Gary Hughes ===
1. "This Thing of Beauty" – 5:25
2. "Seducer" – 4:37
3. "I Won't Break Your Heart" – 4:47
4. "Blonde Angel '93" – 5:59
5. "Suspended Animation" – 5:03
6. "It Must Be Love" – 5:15
7. "Till the Rivers Run Dry" – 4:52
8. "Criminal" – 4:51
9. "We Walk With Angels" – 5:43
10. "Now or Never" – 4:10
11. "Renegade" – 5:07
12. "Look At the Rain" – 4:14
- Track listing is from the 1997 version of the album.

=== Disc two-Precious Ones ===
1. "In Your Eyes" – 5:43
2. "Don't Ever Say Goodbye" – 6:07
3. "The Colours of My Life" – 5:05
4. "Give My Love a Try" – 5:36
5. "Divided We Fall" – 3:44
6. "The Night the Love Died" – 6:03
7. "First Light" (Instrumental) – 0:59
8. "Wrecking Machine" – 5:29
9. "Perfect Ten" – 4:31
10. "This Time" – 4:56
11. "Heart of a Woman" – 5:24
12. "Precious Ones" – 4:15
13. "The Miracle Is You" – 6:33
14. "Be My Fantasy Tonight" – 6:07
15. "All Fall Down" – 2:48
- Tracks 13–15 are added bonus tracks to original release.

== Personnel ==
- Gary Hughes personnel
- Precious Ones personnel
