= Spellbound (Ten album) =

Studio album by Ten
- Released: April 27, 1999
- Genre: Hard rock
- Length: 54:01 (72:04)
- Labels: Frontiers Records; Mercury Records
- Producer: Gary Hughes

Ten chronology
Never Say Goodbye (1998)	Spellbound (1999)	The Best of Ten 1996–1999 (1999)

Spellbound is the fourth studio album released by English hard rock band Ten.

== Track listing ==
All songs written by Gary Hughes, except where noted.

1. "March of the Argonauts" (Instrumental) – 2:14
2. "Fear the Force" – 5:36
3. "Inside the Pyramid of Light" – 4:17 (Hughes, Vinny Burns)
4. "Spellbound" – 5:15
5. "We Rule the Night" – 5:29
6. "Remembrance for the Brave" (Instrumental) – 1:18
7. "Red" – 4:15
8. "The Alchemist" – 5:09
9. "Wonderland" – 5:01
10. "Eclipse" – 4:14
11. "The Phantom" – 6:15
12. "Till the End of Time" – 4:58

NEMS version (NEMS 104) adds

13. "Gimme a Piece of Your Heart" – 5:39 (Hughes, Burns)
14. "When Only Love Can Ease the Pain" – 5:58
15. "Can't Slow Down" (Live version) – 6:26

2016 Japanese SHM-CD remaster (AVALON MICP-11297) bonus track:

13. "Time" - 7:36

== Personnel ==
- Gary Hughes – vocals
- Vinny Burns – Lead guitars
- John Halliwell – Rhythm guitars
- Ged Rylands – keyboards
- Steve McKenna – bass guitar
- Greg Morgan – drums and percussion
- Jason Thanos – backing vocals
- Bob Catley – backing vocals (Track 5)
- Sue Willets – backing vocals (Track 5)
- Rafe McKenna – backing vocals (Track 5)
- Francis Cummings – violin
- Susan Williamson – violin
- Claire McFarlane – viola
- Rebecca Whettan – cello
- Mike McGoldric – uilleann pipes, low whistle and bamboo flute

Production

- Mixing – Rafe McKenna
- Assistant Mixing – Audu Obaje and Dan Sprigg
- Engineers – Audu Obaje
- Assistant Engineer – Neil Amison
