= Mike Stone (music producer) =

English record producer (1951–2002)

- Stone, 1975

Background information
- Born: December 1951
- Died: May 2002 (aged 50)
- Occupation: Record producer
- Years active: 1971–1990, 1995–1997

Michael Richard Seth Stone (December 1951 – May 2002) was an English recording engineer and record producer. He worked with Queen (multiple albums), Foreigner (multiple albums), Journey (multiple albums), Toby Beau, Asia (multiple albums), Whitesnake, April Wine (multiple albums), and others.

== Biography ==
Stone began his career as an assistant recording engineer at Abbey Road Studios in England. While still a teenager, Stone worked on some sessions for The Beatles' Beatles For Sale (1964). Later, he became a runner at Trident Studios, then worked his way up to tape operator and assistant engineer. Beginning with their 1973 debut album, Stone began a long relationship with Queen and producer Roy Thomas Baker, wherein he engineering the unique vocal layering for "Bohemian Rhapsody". Following Baker's departure as Queen's producer, the band hired Stone as their engineer for his expertise in over-dubbing vocals. By the early eighties, Stone had produced popular top-selling albums for both Asia and Journey.

Stone was scheduled to oversee the re-mastering of the Queen catalogue when he died in 2002. Queen's Brian May wrote of Stone in a eulogy: "Mike's production style of big chorus building and hitting hard, the ability to treat vocals uniquely, and find space in a recording have influenced a generation of young producers."

Stone's work productivity was limited in later years by an alcohol problem, and he died of complications from it.

== Selected discography ==
- 1971 Genesis – Nursery Cryme, Tape jockey
- 1973 Queen – Queen, Engineer
- 1974 Queen – Queen II, Engineer
- 1974 Queen – Sheer Heart Attack, Engineer
- 1975 Queen – A Night at the Opera, Engineer
- 1976 Queen – A Day at the Races, Engineer, Guest Vocalist
- 1977 Queen – News of the World, Engineer, Co-producer
- 1978 Toby Beau - Toby Beau, later re-released as "My Angel Baby", Engineer
- 1979 New England – New England, Producer, Engineer
- 1979 Shoes – Present Tense, Producer, Engineer
- 1980 New England - Explorer Suite Co-Producer
- 1981 Journey – Escape, Producer
- 1981 April Wine – The Nature of the Beast, Engineer, Co-producer
- 1981 April Wine – Live in London, Co-mixer
- 1982 Asia – Asia, Producer
- 1982 April Wine – Power Play, Co-producer
- 1983 Asia – Alpha, Producer
- 1983 April Wine – Animal Grace, Co-producer
- 1983 Journey – Frontiers, Producer
- 1984 Tommy Shaw – Girls with Guns, Producer
- 1985 April Wine – One for the Road, Co-producer
- 1985 Asia - Astra, Co-producer
- 1987 Whitesnake – Whitesnake, Producer
- 1987 Helix – Wild in the Streets, Co-producer
- 1988 Ratt – Reach for the Sky, Co-producer
- 1990 Y&T Ten, Producer
- 1995 Foreigner – Mr. Moonlight, Co-producer, Engineer
- 1996 Ten – Ten, Co-producer and mixer
- 1996 Ten – The Name of the Rose, Co-producer and mixer
- 1997 Ten – The Robe, Mixer

== Notes ==
References for record producers with the name 'Mike Stone' often get confused. Others with this name are Mike D. Stone (10/24/1949 – 12/3/2017) of the Record Plant recording studio in Los Angeles, California who engineered for the Bee Gees, Joe Walsh, Frank Zappa, Peter Criss, Paul Stanley, America, and B. B. King, and Mike "Clay" Stone of Clay Records who worked with largely punk and metal acts in the UK.

== See also ==
- Category:Albums produced by Mike Stone (record producer)
- Category:Song recordings produced by Mike Stone (record producer)
