= Gary Hughes =

British rock singer

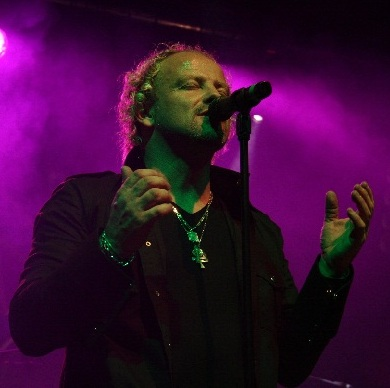
- Hughes in 2011

Background information
- Born: 5 July 1967 (age 59)
- Origin: Manchester, England
- Genres: Hard rock, AOR
- Occupations: Singer, songwriter, producer
- Years active: 1989–present
- Member of: Ten
- Formerly of: Bob Catley
- Website: tenofficial.com

Gary Hughes (born 5 July 1964) is an English singer. Apart from his work as a solo artist, he is the frontman and main songwriter of hard rock/melodic rock band Ten. He has also worked as a producer and songwriter on Bob Catley's first three solo albums and more recently on Serpentine's third studio album, Circle of Knives. He has also produced Hugo's first album and has appeared on Vinny Burns' The Journey solo album and on the Ayreonauts Only album by the band Ayreon.

== Biography ==
Hughes started playing guitar when he was nine years old and a schoolboy at Sale Boys' Grammar School.

His musical career started in 1989 when Hughes released his first album, Big Bad Wolf (renamed and re-released with extra tracks in 1992 as Strength of Heart) through the Polygram Oslo label in Germany and Norway.

In 1992, Hughes signed with the then newly formed Now & Then Records and his forthcoming self-titled album was the first one released on that label.

In 1995, Hughes and former Dare members Vinny Burns on guitar and Greg Morgan on drums begun working on what were to be his third and fourth solo albums. The sessions lead to the formation of the melodic hard rock band Ten.

Between The Robe and Spellbound albums, Hughes released his third solo album named Precious Ones. Precious Ones met with critical acclaim especially in Japan. In 2002, he undertook his most ambitious project yet; the two-album wide rock opera named Once And Future King that was based on King Arthur's myths and legends. The albums were released six months apart from each other and featured the vocals of Bob Catley, Lana Lane, Doogie White, Danny Vaughn, Sean Harris and others.

Hughes wrote and produced Bob Catley's first three solo albums, as well as Hugo's first solo release. Though he has been leading a band for over a decade, he continues to release solo albums as well as working as a songwriter, producer and musician for other artists. His latest release was the 2007 solo album named Veritas which saw a return to his AOR/melodic rock roots, following the Once And Future King project.

In September 2012, Hughes announced on his personal Facebook page that he will be producing and co-writing the new studio album of the band Serpentine. The follow-up album to the highly acclaimed Albion, Isla De Muerta, was released on 20 May via Rocktopia Records, with the band's first EP in 16 years entitled The Dragon And Saint George, following on 4 September. In March 2016, it was announced that his band Ten had signed a new contract with Frontiers Records, for a multi-album deal, starting with the release of Gothica, Ten's 13th studio album in July 2017 and the reissue of the band's back catalogue under the name "Opera Omnia".

In May 2018, he started working on Ten's 14th studio album Illuminati, which was released in November of the same year, through Frontiers Records, while in December 2020, his label Frontiers Records announced the forthcoming release of his seventh solo studio album entitled Waterside and a double CD compilation album featuring tracks from his back catalogue, entitled Decades. Both albums will be released on 12 March 2021. Among the other projects, Hughes is working on a new rock opera project and the debut album of a female singer.

== Discography ==
=== Solo ===
==== Studio albums ====
- Big Bad Wolf (1989)
- Strength of Heart (1990)
- Gary Hughes (1992)
- Precious Ones (1998)
- In Your Eyes EP (1998)
- Once and Future King Part I (2003)
- Once and Future King Part II (2003)
- Veritas (2007)
- Waterside (2021)

==== Compilation albums ====
- The Reissues (2000) (re-issue of Gary Hughes and Precious Ones)
- Decades (2021)

=== With Ten ===
==== Studio albums ====
- X (1996)
- The Name of the Rose (1996)
- The Robe (1997)
- Spellbound (1999)
- Babylon (2000)
- Far Beyond the World (2001)
- Return to Evermore (2004)
- The Twilight Chronicles (2006)
- Stormwarning (2011)
- Heresy and Creed (2012)
- Albion (2014)
- Isla De Muerta (2015)
- Gothica (2017)
- Illuminati (2018)
- Here Be Monsters (2022)
- Something Wicked This Way Comes (2023)

==== Live albums ====
- Never Say Goodbye (1998)

==== Compilation albums ====
- The Best of Ten 1996–1999 (1999)
- Ten/The Name of the Rose (1999)
- The Robe/Bonus Collection (1999)
- The Essential Collection 1995–2005 (2006)
- Battlefield – The Rocktopia Records Collection – limited release (2016)
- Opera Omnia: The Complete Works (2019)

==== EPs ====
- The Name of the Rose (1996)
- The Robe (1997)
- You're in My Heart (1997)
- Fear the Force (1999)
- The Dragon And Saint George (2015)

=== Other projects ===
==== Hugo ====
- Hugo (1997)

==== Bob Catley ====
- The Tower (1998)
- Legends (1999)
- Middle Earth (2001)

==== Vinny Burns ====
- The Journey (1999)

==== Johnny Lima ====
- Shine On (1999)

==== Ayreon ====
- Ayreonauts Only (2000)

==== Serpentine ====
- Circle of Knives (2015)
