= Dance of the Black Tattoo =

Compilation album by Magnum
- Released: 8 January 2021
- Genre: Rock
- Length: 73:04
- Label: Steamhammer Records/SPV
- Producer: Tony Clarkin

Magnum chronology
The Serpent Rings (2020)	Dance of the Black Tattoo (2021)	The Monster Roars (2022)

Dance of the Black Tattoo is a compilation album by British rock band Magnum, released on 8 January 2021. The album consists of 14 previously released tracks, the majority of them featuring former band members Mark Stanway and Harry James. Including seven live tracks, four radio edits and two bonus tracks from Sacred Blood "Divine" Lies. Dance of the Black Tattoo was meant to be the "rockier" counterpart to The Valley of Tears – The Ballads, a compilation album from 2017 that focused on Magnum's softer tracks. The first official lyric video was released on 27 November for the radio edit of On Christmas Day.

The album was put together during the 2020 COVID-19 pandemic, when Magnum had had to cancel a tour to promote their 21st studio album, The Serpent Rings. The record company had suggested that the band make a compilation album to make up for the cancelled tour, in order for the band not to "disappear for two years". While Dance of the Black Tattoo was being put together, Magnum had started recording their 22nd studio album, The Monster Roars, scheduled for release in January 2022.

The album cover was drawn by Rodney Matthews, who has drawn the cover art of most of Magnum's studio albums since 2007's Princess Alice and the Broken Arrow, as well as several albums from the 1980s and 90s.

== Track listing ==
All tracks are written by Tony Clarkin.

Original 2021 release
No.	Title	Length
1.	"Black Skies" (live)	6:06
2.	"Freedom Day" (live)	6:20
3.	"All My Bridges" (live)	4:55
4.	"On A Storyteller's Night" (live)	5:09
5.	"Dance Of The Black Tattoo" (live)	5:53
6.	"On Christmas Day" (radio edit)	4:21
7.	"Born To Be King"	5:31
8.	"Phantom Of Paradise Circus"	6:12
9.	"No God Or Saviour"	5:24
10.	"Your Dreams Won't Die" (live)	5:44
11.	"Twelve Men Wise And Just" (live)	6:22
12.	"Show Me Your Hands" (radio edit)	3:48
13.	"Not Forgiven" (radio edit)	3:38
14.	"Madman Or Messiah" (radio edit)	3:41

== Personnel ==
- Tony Clarkin – guitar
- Bob Catley – vocals
- Dennis Ward – bass guitar
- Alan Barrow - bass guitar
- Rick Benton – keyboards
- Mark Stanway - keyboards
- Lee Morris – drums
- Harry James - drums

== Charts ==
Chart (2021)	Peak position
German Albums (Offizielle Top 100)	42
Scottish Albums (OCC)	15
Swiss Albums (Schweizer Hitparade)	18
UK Rock & Metal Albums (OCC)	1
UK Independent Albums (OCC)	5
