= The Serpent Rings =

Studio album by Magnum
- Released: 17 January 2020
- Genre: Hard rock
- Length: 59:36
- Label: Steamhammer Records/SPV
- Producer: Tony Clarkin

Magnum chronology
Live at the Symphony Hall (2019)	The Serpent Rings (2020)	Dance of the Black Tattoo (2021)

Professional ratings
Review scores
Source	Rating
AllMusic	4/5 stars
laut.de	4/5 stars
Metal Hammer	4/5 stars

The Serpent Rings is the 21st studio album by the British rock band Magnum. The album was released on 17 January 2020. The album was the first Magnum album to feature Dennis Ward on bass, after long-time bassist Al Barrow left the band in June 2019.

The cover was painted by Rodney Matthews. As usual, it features several references to previous album covers, including "The Storyteller" from On a Storyteller's Night.

The Serpent Rings peaked at 5 in the German charts, the highest position the band has achieved there to date. It also charted at 7 in Switzerland, the same position reached by Wings of Heaven in 1988. The album ranked 36 in the United Kingdom, a step back compared to the previous album, Lost on the Road to Eternity, and close to the positions reached by the three albums preceding said release. The album also charted at 47 in Austria, being the third Magnum album to chart there.

The band planned a European tour after the release, but were forced to reschedule several times due to the COVID-19 pandemic. Ultimately, The Serpent Rings got no tour of its own; by the time the band embarked on their March 2022 tour, their next studio album, The Monster Roars, had already been released.

== Track listing ==
All tracks are written by Tony Clarkin.

The Serpent Rings track listing
No.	Title	Length
1.	"Where Are You Eden?"	5:37
2.	"You Can't Run Faster Than Bullets"	5:40
3.	"Madman or Messiah"	5:18
4.	"The Archway of Tears"	6:21
5.	"Not Forgiven"	5:48
6.	"The Serpent Rings"	6:47
7.	"House of Kings"	4:46
8.	"The Great Unknown"	5:27
9.	"Man"	5:31
10.	"The Last One on Earth"	5:35
11.	"Crimson on the White Sand"	4:53

== Personnel ==
- Tony Clarkin – guitar
- Bob Catley – vocals
- Dennis Ward – bass guitar
- Rick Benton – keyboards
- Lee Morris – drums

== Charts ==
Sales chart performance for The Serpent Rings
Chart (2020)	Peak position
Austrian Albums (Ö3 Austria)	47
Belgian Albums (Ultratop Wallonia)	148
German Albums (Offizielle Top 100)	5
Scottish Albums (OCC)	10
Spanish Albums (PROMUSICAE)	56
Swedish Albums (Sverigetopplistan)	29
Swiss Albums (Schweizer Hitparade)	7
UK Albums (OCC)	36
UK Independent Albums (OCC)	4
UK Rock & Metal Albums (OCC)	1

== See also ==
- List of 2020 albums
