= Breath of Life (Magnum album) =

Studio album by Magnum
- Released: 25 February 2002
- Recorded: 2001–2002
- Studio: Mad Hat Studios, Wolverhampton
- Genre: Hard rock
- Length: 58:49
- Label: SPV
- Producer: Tony Clarkin

Magnum chronology
| Days of Wonder (2000) | Breath of Life (2002) | Long Days, Black Nights (2002) |

Professional ratings
Review scores
| Source | Rating |
|---|---|
| AllMusic | 3/5 stars |
| MelodicRock.com | 8/10 stars |

Breath of Life is the 12th studio album by English rock band Magnum. It was released in 2002 by SPV.

Breath of Life is Magnum's comeback album after a break of more than six years. The album marks the return of Bob Catley (vocalist), Tony Clarkin (guitarist) and Mark Stanway (keyboards). Clarkin produced the album during summer 2001 at the Mad Hat Studios in Wolverhampton.

Clarkin says, "The break since the middle of the Nineties was definitely necessary for me. Since the end of the Seventies, in fact since we embarked on the preparations for our debut recording Kingdom of Madness, not a single month had gone by in which I didn't work for Magnum, composed for the group, or at least thought of them permanently. For almost twenty years, all my thoughts had revolved around the band. I needed a break to clear my head and to be able to devote myself to the band again with renewed energy." – Tony Clarkin, 2002.

During his sabbatical, Clarkin worked as a producer, wrote songs for other artists and brought out two albums with Hard Rain together with Bob Catley. Both "Still" and "Dream About You" were demoed by Clarkin and Sue McCloskey. Bob Catley has stated that Breath of Life presented a mix between the styles of Magnum and Hard Rain.

The album was originally intended to be a double CD release containing a free CD of old Magnum material. However, SPV reduced the package to a limited-edition version including three additional tracks on a single CD to lower costs. The double CD was released in Japan.

All of the drum parts on the album are drum samples or were played by Tony Clarkin.

== Track listing ==
All tracks are written by Tony Clarkin, except where noted.

Original 2002 release
| No. | Title | Writer(s) | Length |
|---|---|---|---|
| 1. | "Cry" | | 5:14 |
| 2. | "This Heart" | | 4:03 |
| 3. | "Everyday" | | 6:34 |
| 4. | "Still" | Tony Clarkin, Sue McCloskey | 4:02 |
| 5. | "Dream About You" | Tony Clarkin, Sue McCloskey | 4:15 |
| 6. | "Breath of Life" | | 4:48 |
| 7. | "After The Rain" | | 4:03 |
| 8. | "That Holy Touch" | | 5:11 |
| 9. | "Let Somebody In" | | 4:19 |
| 10. | "The Face of an Enemy" | | 3:47 |
| 11. | "Just Like January" | | 4:29 |
| 12. | "Night After Night" | | 7:55 |

Limited edition bonus tracks
| No. | Title | Length |
|---|---|---|
| 13. | "The Flood (Red Cloud's War)" (Live) | 6:30 |
| 14. | "Back Street Kid" (Live) | 5:29 |
| 15. | "We All Need to Be Loved" (Acoustic radio session) | 4:21 |

Disc 2 (Japanese edition)
| No. | Title | Length |
|---|---|---|
| 1. | "The Flood (Red Cloud's War)" (Live) | 6:30 |
| 2. | "Back Street Kid" (Live) | 5:29 |
| 3. | "It Must Have Been Love" (Live) | 5:53 |
| 4. | "We All Need to Be Loved" (Acoustic radio session) | 4:21 |
| 5. | "Only a Memory" (Live) | 6:12 |
| 6. | "Born to Be King" (Live) | 5:58 |

== Additional Japanese sleeve notes ==
"The only information I can give you on these tracks is that every tour we recorded each night straight onto DAT at the desk so we could check later on the bus how we played and which song went down the best or died whatever the case maybe. We soon abandoned this idea because it drove us nuts but the sound engineer continued to record every show but without stating when or where we were at the time. I think he went nuts as well.

"'We All Need To Be Loved' was an acoustic session for the radio and 'Born To Be King', 'It Must Have Been Love' and 'Only A Memory' on these live versions are different to how we did them on the final albums.

"To leave you with one thought at the end of a tour we could have sixty or seventy DATs to listen to, we never did, so now it's up to you." – Tony Clarkin, 2002

== Personnel ==
- Tony Clarkin – guitar, drums
- Bob Catley – vocals
- Al Barrow – bass guitar
- Mark Stanway – keyboards

Additional musicians

- Wally Lowe – bass guitar (on disc 2)
- Mickey Barker – drums (on disc 2)

== Charts ==
| Chart (2002) | Peak position |
|---|---|
| German Albums (Offizielle Top 100) | 67 |
| UK Rock & Metal Albums (OCC) | 14 |
