= Live at the Symphony Hall =

Album by Magnum

Live album by Magnum
- Released: 18 January 2019
- Recorded: 19 April 2018
- Length: 97:00
- Label: Steamhammer Records/SPV
- Producer: Tony Clarkin

Magnum chronology
Lost on the Road to Eternity (2018)	Live at the Symphony Hall (2019)	The Serpent Rings (2020)

Live at the Symphony Hall is a live album by the English rock band Magnum, released in 2019 by SPV.

The album was recorded on 19 April 2018 at Birmingham's Symphony Hall, and is the first live album by Magnum to feature Rick Benton on keyboards and Lee Morris on drums. It was also the first live album to feature Tobias Sammet as a guest vocalist, and the last with Al Barrow as bassist.

The album cover art is taken from that of the band's previous album Lost on the Road to Eternity, which was painted by Rodney Matthews.

== Track listing ==
All tracks are written by Tony Clarkin.

No.	Title	Length
1.	"When We Were Younger"	8:00
2.	"Sacred Blood "Divine" Lies"	6:28
3.	"Lost on the Road to Eternity (feat. Tobias Sammet)"	6:11
4.	"Crazy Old Mothers"	5:35
5.	"Without Love"	6:14
6.	"Your Dreams Won't Die"	5:42
7.	"Peaches and Cream"	5:09
8.	"How Far Jerusalem"	10:35
9.	"Les Morts Dansant"	5:25
10.	"Show Me Your Hands"	5:52
11.	"All England's Eyes"	4:48
12.	"Vigilante"	5:24
13.	"Don't Wake the Lion (Too Old to Die Young)"	11:43
14.	"The Spirit"	4:30
15.	"When the World Comes Down"	6:11

== Personnel ==
- Tony Clarkin – guitar
- Bob Catley – vocals
- Al Barrow – bass guitar
- Rick Benton – keyboards
- Lee Morris – drums
- Tobias Sammet – vocals

== Charts ==
Chart (2019)	Peak position
German Albums (Offizielle Top 100)	18
Scottish Albums (OCC)	38
Swiss Albums (Schweizer Hitparade)	33
UK Independent Albums (OCC)	9
UK Rock & Metal Albums (OCC)	2
