= Sacred Blood "Divine" Lies =

Studio album by Magnum
- Released: 26 February 2016
- Genre: Hard rock
- Length: 54:21
- Label: Steamhammer Records/SPV
- Producer: Tony Clarkin

Magnum chronology
Escape from the Shadow Garden – Live 2014 (2015)	Sacred Blood "Divine" Lies (2016)	The Valley of Tears – The Ballads (2017)

Sacred Blood "Divine" Lies is the 19th studio album by the British rock band Magnum. The album was released on 26 February 2016. It is the last studio album of original material to feature longtime keyboardist Mark Stanway, who left the band in December 2016. The cover was painted by Rodney Matthews.

The album entered the charts at number 31 in the United Kingdom, the highest chart position there since 1992's Sleepwalking. Compared to the previous album Escape from the Shadow Garden, the album went slightly back in the European charts, charting 20 in Germany, 23 in Sweden, and 26 in Switzerland. The album also became the first Magnum record to chart in Austria, peaking at 57.

Bob Catley stated that contrary to what the name of the title track may imply, the song is not a critique of religion; rather, it criticizes cult leaders who exploit their followers' shortcomings to present themselves as superior.

== Track listing ==
All tracks are written by Tony Clarkin.

Original 2016 CD release
No.	Title	Length
1.	"Sacred Blood "Divine" Lies"	6:41
2.	"Crazy Old Mothers"	5:48
3.	"Gypsy Queen"	4:29
4.	"Princess in Rags (The Cult)"	5:27
5.	"Your Dreams Won't Die"	5:25
6.	"Afraid of the Night"	4:32
7.	"A Forgotten Conversation"	4:56
8.	"Quiet Rhapsody"	5:40
9.	"Twelve Men Wise and Just"	6:18
10.	"Don't Cry Baby"	5:05

Limited edition bonus tracks
No.	Title	Length
11.	"Phantom of Paradise Circus"	5:54
12.	"Don't Grow Up"	4:47
13.	"No God or Saviour"	5:53

== Personnel ==
- Tony Clarkin – guitar
- Bob Catley – vocals
- Al Barrow – bass guitar
- Mark Stanway – keyboards
- Harry James – drums

== Charts ==
Chart (2016)	Peak position
Austrian Albums (Ö3 Austria)	57
Belgian Albums (Ultratop Wallonia)	145
German Albums (Offizielle Top 100)	20
Swedish Albums (Sverigetopplistan)	23
Swiss Albums (Schweizer Hitparade)	26
Scottish Albums (OCC)	24
UK Albums (OCC)	31
UK Independent Albums (OCC)	6
UK Rock & Metal Albums (OCC)	2
