= Escape from the Shadow Garden =

Studio album by Magnum
- Released: 19 March 2014
- Genre: Hard rock
- Length: 62:41
- Label: Steamhammer Records/SPV
- Producer: Tony Clarkin

Magnum chronology
| On the 13th Day (2012) | Escape from the Shadow Garden (2014) | Escape from the Shadow Garden – Live 2014 (2015) |

Professional ratings
Review scores
| Source | Rating |
|---|---|
| Scream Magazine | 5/6 stars |

Escape from the Shadow Garden is the 18th studio album by the British rock band Magnum (including Keeping the Nite Light Burning and ignoring Evolution). Escape From the Shadow Garden was released on 19 March 2014 in Scandinavia, 21 March in Germany, Austria and Switzerland, 24 March in the rest of Europe, and 1 April in the US and Canada. As with On the 13th Day the band were hosts to their fans at a record launch party held at the Robin 2 in Bilston on 25 March 2014, the day after the UK release.

The album entered the charts at number 14 in the German Albums Chart, 19 in the Swedish Albums Chart, 22 in the Switzerland Albums Chart and 38 in the official UK Albums Chart, a position last achieved by Magnum with The Eleventh Hour! in 1983; these were Magnum's highest chart positions in Germany and Sweden since Goodnight L.A. (1990), and in England and Switzerland since Sleepwalking (1992). In addition to these achievements the album reached number 2 in the UK Rock & Metal Charts and number 4 Indie Charts in the UK.

== Song themes ==
"Midnight Angel" tells the story of a young girl in South America who turns to prostitution, and is abused by a famous politician. Afraid that she will speak out, he stabs her and dumps her in a river.

"The Art of Compromise" is about making a relationship work.

"The Valley of Tears" is about not letting ambitions distract one from everything one has to be grateful for. As Bob Catley put it, "What is the meaning of life? Be happy with whatever is around you, your family, your friends, and whatever you do in life [...] don't look too far ahead, look at your feet and you've probably got everything you need right there".

== Track listing ==
All tracks are written by Tony Clarkin.

Original 2014 CD release
| No. | Title | Length |
|---|---|---|
| 1. | "Live 'Til You Die" | 6:29 |
| 2. | "Unwritten Sacrifice" | 5:28 |
| 3. | "Falling for the Big Plan" | 5:59 |
| 4. | "Crying in the Rain" | 5:45 |
| 5. | "Too Many Clowns" | 4:36 |
| 6. | "Midnight Angel" | 7:18 |
| 7. | "The Art of Compromise" | 5:01 |
| 8. | "Don't Fall Asleep" | 5:59 |
| 9. | "Wisdom's Had Its Day" | 4:44 |
| 10. | "Burning River" | 4:43 |
| 11. | "The Valley of Tears" | 6:39 |

Original 2014 vinyl double-LP edition
| No. | Title | Length |
|---|---|---|
| 12. | "Dance of the Black Tattoo" (Live – Bonus track) |

== Personnel ==
- Tony Clarkin – guitar
- Bob Catley – vocals
- Al Barrow – bass guitar
- Mark Stanway – keyboards
- Harry James – drums

== Charts ==
| Chart (2014) | Peak position |
|---|---|
| German Albums (Offizielle Top 100) | 14 |
| Swedish Albums (Sverigetopplistan) | 19 |
| Swiss Albums (Schweizer Hitparade) | 22 |
| Scottish Albums (Official Charts) | 44 |
| UK Albums (Official Charts) | 38 |
| UK Independent Albums (Official Charts) | 4 |
| UK Rock & Metal Albums (Official Charts) | 2 |
