= Hard Rain =

Hard Rain may refer to:

- Hard Rain (Bob Dylan album), 1976
- Hard Rain (band), a British rock band
  - Hard Rain (Hard Rain album), 1997
- Hard Rain (film), a 1998 action film
- Hard Rain, the name of the fourth campaign of the video game Left 4 Dead 2
- Hard Rain (novel), a 2003 novel by Barry Eisler, since republished as A Lonely Resurrection
- Hard Rain, a late 1980s British band on London Records

== See also ==
- "A Hard Rain's a-Gonna Fall", a 1963 song by Bob Dylan
- Hard Rain Don't Last, 2000 debut album by country music singer Darryl Worley
- Hard Rain Falling, a 1966 crime novel by Don Carpenter
- Heavy Rain, a PlayStation 3 game
- High Land, Hard Rain, 1983 debut album by the band Aztec Camera
