= Here Comes the Rain (album) =

Studio album by Magnum
- Released: 12 January 2024
- Recorded: 2023
- Studio: M2 Studios
- Genre: Hard rock
- Length: 50:09
- Label: Steamhammer Records/SPV
- Producer: Tony Clarkin

Magnum chronology
The Monster Roars (2022)	Here Comes the Rain (2024)	Live At KK's Steel Mill (2025)

Singles from Here Comes the Rain
- 1. "Blue Tango" Released: 22 November 2023; 2. "The Seventh Darkness" Released: 3 January 2024

Here Comes the Rain is the twenty-third studio album by English rock band Magnum. It was released on 12 January 2024 through Steamhammer Records/SPV. It is the final album with founding guitarist, vocalist, and songwriter Tony Clarkin following his death on 7 January 2024, just five days before the album's release. The album charted at 2 in Germany, 3 in Austria and 4 in Switzerland, the highest of any Magnum album in all three countries.

== Background and promotion ==
Here Comes the Rain was called a success "in creating an outstanding, colourful, varied and inspired" project. Guitarist Tony Clarkin stated that "everyone played their part without [him] dictating anything" by sticking to their intuition and inspiration. The album artwork was once again designed by British artist Rodney Matthews, who has been responsible for numerous Magnum covers. Here Comes the Rain is supported by two singles: "Blue Tango" on 22 November 2023 and "The Seventh Darkness" on 3 January 2024.

== Critical reception ==
Professional ratings
Review scores
Source	Rating
Rock Hard	8.5/10

In a positive review for Rock Hard, Alexandra Michels chose Here Comes the Rain as the album of the month. Michels opined that the band is unable to deliver a bad album, therefore fans of melodic hard rock should be unequivocal in their support. The author named the tracks "Run into the Shadows", "Blue Tango", "The Seventh Darkness", and "Some Kind of Treachery" as highlights.

== Track listing ==
All tracks are written by Tony Clarkin.

Here Comes the Rain track listing
No.	Title	Length
1.	"Run into the Shadows"	5:22
2.	"Here Comes the Rain"	4:36
3.	"Some Kind of Treachery"	4:31
4.	"After the Silence"	4:35
5.	"Blue Tango"	5:26
6.	"The Day He Lied"	4:34
7.	"The Seventh Darkness"	4:43
8.	"Broken City"	4:39
9.	"I Wanna Live"	5:28
10.	"Borderline"	6:15
Total length:		50:09

== Personnel ==
Magnum

- Bob Catley – vocals
- Tony Clarkin – guitars, production
- Rick Benton – keyboards, string arrangements
- Lee Morris – drums
- Dennis Ward – bass, backing vocals

Additional contributors

- Sheena Sear – mastering, mixing, engineering, string arrangements
- Liam Doherty – additional vocals on "Run into the Shadows", "The Seventh Darkness", and "I Wanna Live"
- Brendon Riley – additional vocals on "Run into the Shadows", "The Seventh Darkness", and "I Wanna Live"
- Kyle Lamley – additional vocals on "Run into the Shadows", "The Seventh Darkness", and "I Wanna Live"
- Chris "Beebe" Aldridge – brass on "Some Kind of Treachery" and "I Wanna Live"
- Nick Dewhurst – brass on "Some Kind of Treachery" and "I Wanna Live"
- Al Barrow – artwork, booklet
- Rodney Matthews – front cover artwork
- Rob Barrow – band photos

== Charts ==
Chart performance for Here Comes the Rain
Chart (2024)	Peak position
Austrian Albums (Ö3 Austria)	3
German Albums (Offizielle Top 100)	2
Swedish Albums (Sverigetopplistan)	23
Swiss Albums (Schweizer Hitparade)	4
UK Albums (OCC)	68
UK Independent Albums (OCC)	4
UK Rock & Metal Albums (OCC)	1
