= Rock Art (album) =

Studio album by Magnum
- Released: 6 June 1994
- Recorded: Magnum Studios, Birmingham, 1994
- Genre: Hard rock
- Length: 55:00
- Label: EMI
- Producer: Tony Clarkin

Magnum chronology
| Keeping The Nite Light Burning (1993) | Rock Art (1994) | The Last Dance (1996) |

Singles from Rock Art
- 1. "The Tall Ships" Released: 1994; 2. "Back in Your Arms Again" Released: 1994

Professional ratings
Review scores
| Source | Rating |
|---|---|
| AllMusic | 3/5 stars |

Rock Art is the 11th studio album by the English rock band Magnum and was released in 1994 by EMI. It was the last album released by the band's first incarnation.

The album got its name because Tony Clarkin watched a documentary about cave paintings from the stone age.

Two singles were released from the album, "The Tall Ships" and "Back In Your Arms Again". However, they were only distributed in Germany. "On Christmas Day" is a reflection on the World War I Christmas truce in December 1914, involving French, Scottish and German soldiers.

The album charted 57 in the United Kingdom, the band's lowest chart position there since Magnum II. The band disbanded the next year, with Tony Clarkin and Bob Catley forming Hard Rain.

== Track listing ==
All tracks are written by Tony Clarkin.

Original 1994 release
| No. | Title | Length |
|---|---|---|
| 1. | "We All Need to Be Loved" | 5:05 |
| 2. | "Hard Hearted Woman" | 3:49 |
| 3. | "Back in Your Arms Again" | 5:59 |
| 4. | "Rock Heavy" | 3:58 |
| 5. | "The Tall Ships" | 5:06 |
| 6. | "Tell Tale Eyes" | 4:52 |
| 7. | "Love's a Stranger" | 5:11 |
| 8. | "Hush-A-Bye Baby" | 4:48 |
| 9. | "Just This Side of Heaven" | 4:20 |
| 10. | "I Will Decide Myself" | 4:15 |
| 11. | "On Christmas Day" | 7:10 |

== Singles ==
The Tall Ships CD (1994)

1. "The Tall Ships" [edit] – 3:55
2. "The Tall Ships" [LP version] – 5:06
3. "Hard Hearted Woman" [LP version] – 3:49
4. "You Don't Have To Be Baby To Cry" (Tony Clarkin) [B-side] – 5:24

Back In Your Arms Again CD (1994)

1. "Back In Your Arms Again" [LP version] – 5:59
2. "Hush-A-Bye Baby" [LP version] – 4:48
3. "Don't Start Me Talking" (Sonny Boy Williamson) [B-side] – 2:41
4. "Big Hunk O' Love" (Aaron Schroeder and Sid Wyche) [B-side] – 2:59

== Personnel ==
- Tony Clarkin – guitar
- Bob Catley – vocals
- Wally Lowe – bass guitar
- Mark Stanway – keyboards
- Mickey Barker – drums

Additional musicians

- Jacki Graham – backing vocals
- Mo Birch – backing vocals
- P.J. Wright – pedal steel guitars

Production

- Arranged by Magnum
- Engineered and mixed by Stephen Harris
- Sound engineer – Mike Cowling
- Recorded at Abbey Road, London, and Zella Studios, Birmingham
- Artwork by Eleanor Smith
- Photography by Simon Harding Photography
- Electronic design & art direction — BAVIEmage
- Rock Art was recorded on 3M 996 tape

== Charts ==
| Chart (1994) | Peak position |
|---|---|
| German Albums (Offizielle Top 100) | 83 |
| Swedish Albums (Sverigetopplistan) | 24 |
| Swiss Albums (Schweizer Hitparade) | 31 |
| UK Albums (OCC) | 57 |
