= Escape from the Shadow Garden – Live 2014 =

Album by Magnum

Wings of Heaven Live

Live album by Magnum
- Released: 6 May 2015 (Scandinavia); 8 May 2015 (Germany); 11 May (Rest of Europe); 12 May (United States)
- Recorded: 2014
- Length: 74:18
- Label: Steamhammer Records/SPV

Magnum chronology
Escape from the Shadow Garden (2014)	Wings of Heaven Live (2015)	Sacred Blood "Divine" Lies (2016)

Escape from the Shadow Garden – Live 2014 is a live album by the English rock band Magnum, released in 2014 by SPV.

The album was recorded in the spring of 2014 during the band's tour to support the album Escape from the Shadow Garden. The songs on the album came from seven of Magnum's albums. The album became the first live album by Magnum to chart in Germany, peaking at 82.

== Track listing ==
All tracks are written by Tony Clarkin.

No.	Title	Length
1.	"Live 'til You Die"	6:58
2.	"Black Skies"	5:52
3.	"Freedom Day"	6:07
4.	"Dance Of The Black Tattoo"	5:52
5.	"Blood Red Laughter"	5:12
6.	"Unwritten Sacrifice"	5:31
7.	"How Far Jerusalem"	10:39
8.	"Les Morts Dansant"	5:32
9.	"Falling For The Big Plan"	6:00
10.	"All England's Eyes"	4:48
11.	"Vigilante"	5:24
12.	"Kingdom of Madness"	6:23

== Personnel ==
- Tony Clarkin — guitar
- Bob Catley — vocals
- Al Barrow — bass guitar
- Mark Stanway — keyboards
- Harry James — drums

== Charts ==
Chart (2015)	Peak position
German Albums (Offizielle Top 100)	82
Scottish Albums (OCC)	78
UK Albums (OCC)	91
UK Rock & Metal Albums (OCC)	5
UK Independent Albums (OCC)	14
