= The Gathering (Magnum album) =

Compilation album by Magnum
- Released: 2010
- Recorded: 1978–2009
- Genre: Rock; Melodic rock Progressive rock
- Length: Disc 1: 1:13:36; Disc 2: 1:17:23; Disc 3: 1:16:38; Disc 4: 1:15:55; Disc 5: 1:13:39
- Label: Sanctuary Records

Magnum chronology
Into the Valley of the Moonking (2009)	The Gathering (2010)

The Gathering is a five-disc, career-spanning compilation album by British melodic rock band Magnum, released in 2010 by Sanctuary Records. It features previously unreleased live recordings, rare demos, b-sides and a live recording from Hammersmith Odeon, from 1988's Wings of Heaven tour.

"It wasn't enormous", said guitarist Tony Clarkin of his involvement. "I wanted a few tracks taken off, and I came up with the title… It turned out to be a really nice package."

== Track listing ==
All tracks are written by Tony Clarkin, except where noted.

Disc 1
No.	Title	Original Release	Length
1.	"Stormbringer" (Demo)	Archive	3:31
2.	"Find the Time" (Outtake)	Archive	3:04
3.	"In the Beginning"	Kingdom of Madness	7:52
4.	"Baby Rock Me"	Kingdom of Madness	4:05
5.	"Universe"	Kingdom of Madness	3:45
6.	"Kingdom of Madness" (Alternate Version)	Archive	3:56
7.	"Great Adventure"	Magnum II	4:54
8.	"Changes" (7" Remix)	Changes Remix single	4:11
9.	"The Battle"	Magnum II	2:10
10.	"All of My Life"	Magnum II	4:43
11.	"If I Could Live Forever" (Live)	Marauder	4:07
12.	"Foolish Heart" (Live)	Marauder	3:08
13.	"Lords of Chaos" (Live)	Marauder	3:48
14.	"Lights Burned Out" (Demo)	Archive	4:06
15.	"Soldier of the Line"	Chase the Dragon	4:16
16.	"On the Edge of the World"	Chase the Dragon	4:22
17.	"The Spirit"	Chase the Dragon	4:17
18.	"The Teacher"	Chase the Dragon	3:21

Disc 2
No.	Title	Original Release	Length
1.	"Back to Earth" (A-Side)	Back To Earth 7"	3:39
2.	"Hold Back Your Love" (A-Side)	Back To Earth 7"	3:22
3.	"Long Days Black Nights" (B-Side)	The Lights Burned Out 7"	3:11
4.	"The Word" (Orchestral Version)	Just Like and Arrow 12"	4:58
5.	"True Fine Love" (Outtake)	Archive	3:22
6.	"The Prize"	The Eleventh Hour	3:39
7.	"Breakdown"	The Eleventh Hour	3:59
8.	"Vicious Companions"	The Eleventh Hour	3:36
9.	"One Night of Passion"	The Eleventh Hour	3:48
10.	"Road to Paradise"	The Eleventh Hour	3:30
11.	"All England's Eyes" (Demo)	On A Storyteller's Night 20th Anniversary Expanded Edition	4:50
12.	"How Far Jerusalem"	On A Storyteller's Night	6:25
13.	"Just Like an Arrow"	On A Storyteller's Night	3:22
14.	"On a Storyteller's Night"	On A Storyteller's Night	4:59
15.	"Les Morts Dansants"	On A Storyteller's Night	5:47
16.	"Lonely Night"	Vigilante	3:48
17.	"Need a Lot of Love"	Vigilante	4:48
18.	"Midnight (You Won't Be Sleeping)" (12" Remix)	Midnight single	6:20

Disc 3
No.	Title	Original Release	Length
1.	"When the World Comes Down"	Vigilante	5:20
2.	"Vigilante"	Vigilante	6:40
3.	"Days of No Trust" (12" Version)	Days of No Trust 12"	5:23
4.	"Wild Swan"	Wings of Heaven	6:15
5.	"It Must Have Been Love"	Wings of Heaven	5:16
6.	"Don't Wake the Lion (Too Old To Die Young)"	Wings of Heaven	10:34
7.	"Start Talking Love"	Wings of Heaven	3:36
8.	"Crying Time" (B-Side)	It Must Have Been Love 7"	4:47
9.	"C'est La Vie" (B-Side)	Start Talking Love 7"	4:13
10.	"Maybe Tonight" (B-Side)	Days of No Trust 7"	4:39
11.	"Rockin' Chair" (Tony Clarkin, Russ Ballard)	Goodnight L.A.	4:10
12.	"Heartbroke And Busted"	Goodnight L.A.	3:37
13.	"What Kind of Love Is This?" (Tony Clarkin, Jim Vallance)	Goodnight L.A.	4:35
14.	"Hanging Tree" (B-Side)	Heartbroke And Busted 7"	3:39
15.	"Cry for You" (Tony Clarkin, Sue Shiffron)	Heartbroke And Busted 7"	3:54

Disc 4
No.	Title	Original Release	Length
1.	"Where Do You Run To" (B-Side)	Rockin' Chair 7"	3:44
2.	"Stormy Weather"	Sleepwalking	4:42
3.	"Just A Little Bit" (B-Side)	Only in America single	3:59
4.	"Maybe Tonight" (Acoustic)	Keeping The Nite Light Burning	3:30
5.	"Without Your Love" (Acoustic)	Keeping The Nite Light Burning	4:45
6.	"We All Need To Be Loved"	Rock Art	5:05
7.	"The Tall Ships"	Rock Art	5:06
8.	"The Last Dance" (Live)	The Last Dance	5:02
9.	"Sacred Hour" (Live)	The Last Dance	5:46
10.	"Breath of Life"	Breath of Life	4:48
11.	"Brand New Morning"	Brand New Morning	6:17
12.	"Dragons Are Real"	Princess Alice and the Broken Arrow	5:21
13.	"Thank You for the Day"	Princess Alice and the Broken Arrow	5:10
14.	"The Moonking"	Into the Valley of the Moonking	6:16
15.	"A Face in the Crowd"	Into the Valley of the Moonking	6:24

Disc 5: Live at Hammersmith 26 March 1988
No.	Title	Original Release	Length
1.	"Vigilante"	Live: On The Wings of Heaven VHS	6:40
2.	"Wild Swan"	Live: On The Wings of Heaven VHS	6:15
3.	"Start Talking Love"	Live: On The Wings of Heaven VHS	3:36
4.	"On a Storyteller's Night"	Live: On The Wings of Heaven VHS	4:59
5.	"Need a Lot of Love"	Live: On The Wings of Heaven VHS	4:48
6.	"How Far Jerusalem"	Live: On The Wings of Heaven VHS	6:25
7.	"Lonely Night"	Previously Unreleased	3:48
8.	"Days of No Trust"	Live: On The Wings of Heaven VHS	5:23
9.	"Don't Wake the Lion (Too Old To Die Young)"	Live: On The Wings of Heaven VHS	10:34
10.	"Midnight (You Won't Be Sleeping)"	Previously Unreleased	4:01
11.	"Just Like an Arrow"	Live: On The Wings of Heaven VHS	3:22
12.	"Kingdom of Madness"	Live: On The Wings of Heaven VHS	3:56
13.	"The Spirit"	Previously Unreleased	4:17
14.	"Sacred Hour"	Live: On The Wings of Heaven VHS	5:35

== Personnel ==
- Tony Clarkin – Guitar
- Bob Catley – Vocals
- Wally Lowe – Bass
- Richard Bailey – Keyboards, Flute
- Kex Gorin – Drums
- Mark Stanway – Keyboards
- Robin George – Guitar
- Mickey Barker – Drums
- Jim Simpson – Drums
- Harry James – Drums
- Al Barrow – Bass
- Jimmy Copley – Drums
