= The River Sessions (Magnum album) =

Live album by Magnum
- Released: July 2004
- Recorded: Mayfair, Glasgow; United Kingdom; 1985
- Genre: Hard rock
- Length: 78:00
- Label: River Records
- Producer: Tony Clarkin

Magnum chronology
Long Days, Black Nights (2002)	The River Sessions (2004)	Brand New Morning (2004)

The River Sessions is a live album by the English rock band Magnum, recorded on 28 May 1985 at The Mayfair, Glasgow, Scotland, by Radio Clyde and released in 2004.

== Track listing ==
All tracks are written by Tony Clarkin

Original 2004 release
No.	Title	Length
1.	"Before First Light"	3:39
2.	"The Spirit"	4:45
3.	"All England's Eyes"	4:39
4.	"The Light Burned Out"	4:46
5.	"Endless Love"	4:17
6.	"How Far Jerusalem"	6:37
7.	"On a Storyteller's Night"	4:48
8.	"The Prize"	3:47
9.	"Les Mort Dansant"	5:43
10.	"Just Like an Arrow"	3:50
11.	"Two Hearts"	7:54
12.	"Soldier of the Line"	4:08
13.	"Changes"	3:18
14.	"Kingdom of Madness"	4:36
15.	"Sacred Hour"	6:12
16.	"The Last Dance"	4:51

== Personnel ==
- Tony Clarkin – guitar
- Bob Catley – vocals
- Wally Lowe – bass guitar
- Mark Stanway – keyboards
- Mickey Barker – drums
