= The Valley of Tears – The Ballads =

Compilation album by Magnum
- Released: 6 January 2017
- Recorded: 2016
- Genre: Rock
- Length: 53:49
- Label: Steamhammer Records/SPV
- Producer: Tony Clarkin

Magnum chronology
Sacred Blood "Divine" Lies (2016)	The Valley of Tears – The Ballads (2017)	Lost on the Road to Eternity (2018)

The Valley of Tears – The Ballads is a compilation album by British rock band Magnum, released on 6 January 2017. The album features 10 remastered, remixed or re-recorded ballads from the band's catalogue. The release was supported with a few shows in the United Kingdom and Ireland before the release date, and a tour in Switzerland and Germany from March 30.

== Track listing ==
All tracks are written by Tony Clarkin.

Original 2017 release
No.	Title	Length
1.	"Dream About You" (remastered)	4:17
2.	"Back in Your Arms Again" (re-recorded)	6:02
3.	"The Valley of Tears" (remixed, remastered)	6:38
4.	"Broken Wheel" (re-recorded)	4:03
5.	"A Face in the Crowd" (remixed, remastered)	6:28
6.	"Your Dreams Won't Die" (remastered)	5:27
7.	"Lonely Night" (acoustic version, re-recorded)	4:20
8.	"The Last Frontier" (remixed, remastered)	5:37
9.	"Putting Things in Place" (remixed, remastered)	4:42
10.	"When the World Comes Down" (new live version)	6:15

== Personnel ==
- Tony Clarkin – guitar
- Bob Catley – vocals
- Al Barrow – bass guitar
- Mark Stanway – keyboards
- Harry James – drums

== Charts ==
Chart (2017)	Peak position
German Albums (Offizielle Top 100)	98
Scottish Albums (OCC)	99
UK Independent Albums (OCC)	12
