= Chapter and Verse =

Chapter and Verse or Chapter & Verse may refer to:

== Music ==
- Chapter and Verse (Funeral for a Friend album), a 2015 post-hardcore album
- Chapter and Verse (Bruce Springsteen album), a companion album to Springsteen's 2016 autobiography Born to Run
- Chapter & Verse – The Very Best of Magnum, a 1993 rock compilation album
- Chapter & Verse (Gabby Barrett album), 2024
- "Chapter and Verse", a song by Utopia from the 1982 new wave album Utopia
- Chapter and Verse, a 1988 demo by gothic rock band Rosetta Stone
- Chapter and Verse, a 2008 album by jazz musician Barbara Thompson

== Other ==
- Chapters and verses of the Bible or another holy book
- Chapter & Verse (film), a 2017 film directed by Jamal Joseph
