= Evolution (Magnum album) =

Compilation album by Magnum
- Released: 14 November 2011
- Recorded: 2001 – 2011
- Genre: Rock
- Length: 69:38
- Label: SPV/Steamhammer
- Producer: Tony Clarkin

Magnum chronology
The Visitation (2011)	Evolution (2011)	On the 13th Day (2012)

Professional ratings
Review scores
Source	Rating
AllMusic	3/5 stars
Classic Rock	7/10 stars

Evolution is a retrospective compilation album by the English rock band Magnum, released by SPV/Steamhammer on 11 November 2011 in Germany and 14 November in the UK and the rest of Europe. The album marks the tenth anniversary of the band since their reformation in 2001, as well as the band's tenth anniversary with SPV GmbH.

The album features material culled from the band's last five releases by SPV in re-recorded, remixed and remastered form, including two new songs.

== Track listing ==
All tracks are written by Tony Clarkin.

No.	Title	Length
1.	"That Holy Touch" (remix)	4:47
2.	"Just Like January" (remix)	4:38
3.	"Brand New Morning" (remix)	5:52
4.	"Immigrant Son" (remix)	5:31
5.	"When We Were Younger" (remix)	6:48
6.	"Out of the Shadows" (remix)	6:38
7.	"All My Bridges" (remix)	4:40
8.	"Blood on Your Barbed Wire Thorns" (remix)	6:50
9.	"The Visitation"	5:48
10.	"Wild Angels"	5:40
11.	"The Fall" (new recording)	5:38
12.	"Do You Know Who You Are?" (new recording)	6:49

== Personnel ==
- Bob Catley — vocals
- Tony Clarkin — guitar
- Mark Stanway — keyboards
- Al Barrow — bass
- Harry James — drums

== Charts ==
Chart (2011)	Peak position
UK Independent Albums (Official Charts)	34
