= That Ain't Love =

That Ain't Love may refer to:

- "That Ain't Love", hit song by REO Speedwagon from album Life as We Know It
- "That Ain't Love", song by Raz Simone
- "That Ain't Love", song by King Bees (band) 1966
- "That Ain't Love", song by Robert Cray from Twenty (Robert Cray album)
- "That Ain't Love", song by Hard Rain from Hard Rain (Hard Rain album)
