= When the Good Times Come =

Studio album by Hard Rain
- Released: 17 May 1999
- Recorded: Mad Hat Studios, Wolverhampton
- Genre: Hard rock
- Length: 51:02
- Label: Eagle Records
- Producer: Tony Clarkin

Hard Rain chronology
Hard Rain (1997)	When the Good Times Come (1999)

Professional ratings
Review scores
Source	Rating
melodicrock.com	7.4/10 link

When the Good Times Come is the second and final studio album by British melodic rock band Hard Rain. It was released in 1999 on Eagle Records.

Vocalist Bob Catley stated that unlike Hard Rain's debut album, When the Good Times Come was stylistically different from anything they would have recorded as Magnum.

== Track listing ==
All Tracks written by Tony Clarkin.

1. "Eat It Up"
2. "Who You Gonna Trust"
3. "Rock Me in Ya Cradle"
4. "No One Can Show You the Way"
5. "When the Good Times Come"
6. "Talks Like a Lady"
7. "An Ordinary Day"
8. "Showtime"
9. "Lightnin' Strikes"
10. "Never Say Never"
11. "Step Back"

== Personnel ==
- Tony Clarkin – guitar
- Bob Catley – vocals
- Sue McCloskey – vocals
- Paul Hodson – keyboards
- Al Barrow – bass
- Rob Barrow – drums

Production

- Recorded and mixed at Mad Hat Studios, Walsall, United Kingdom
- Produced Tony Clarkin
- Engineered and mixed by Mike Cowling
- Mastered and edited at Hatch Farm Studios, Addlestone, Surrey by Nick Smith
- Additional mastering at Mad Hat Studios, Walsall by Claire Swan and Mark Stuart

Additional musicians

- Brian Bannister – harmonica on "Eat It Up"

Additional instruments on "Showtime"

- Justin Tundervary – trumpet
- Gary Barnacle – saxophone
- Andy "Freddy" Rogers – trombone

Choir on "No One Can Show You the Way"

- Bob Catley – vocals
- Sue McCloskey – vocals
- Paul Hodson – vocals
- Al Barrow – vocals
- Rob Barrow – vocals
- Sue Parkes – vocals
- Anita Barrow – vocals
- John Hampton – vocals
- Nikki Hall – vocals
