= Into the Valley of the Moonking =

Studio album by Magnum
- Released: 15 June 2009
- Recorded: M2 Studios, Coven
- Genre: Hard rock
- Length: 58:10
- Label: SPV
- Producer: Sheena Sear, Tony Clarkin

Magnum chronology
Wings of Heaven Live (2008)	Into the Valley of the Moonking (2009)	The Visitation (2011)

Professional ratings
Review scores
Source	Rating
Dangerdog Music Reviews	3.5/5 stars
Komodo Rock	(9.6/10)

Into the Valley of the Moonking is the 15th studio album by the English rock band Magnum, released on 15 June 2009 by SPV.

The album charter number 82 in the United Kingdom, going slightly back compared to the previous album. The album also charted in Switzerland for the first time since 1994.

The artwork was illustrated by Rodney Matthews following his sleeve design for Magnum's previous album Princess Alice and the Broken Arrow and Wings of Heaven Live. Into the Valley of the Moonking was released in three different versions: a regular jewel case CD, a Digipak consisting of a CD and bonus DVD, and a vinyl format for collectors with two LPs and a fold-out cover.

== Track listing ==
All tracks are written by Tony Clarkin.

Original 2009 release
No.	Title	Length
1.	"Intro"	1:30
2.	"Cry to Yourself"	4:40
3.	"All My Bridges"	4:41
4.	"Take Me to the Edge"	4:17
5.	"The Moonking"	6:16
6.	"No One Knows His Name"	4:32
7.	"In My Mind's Eye"	5:42
8.	"Time to Cross That River"	5:17
9.	"If I Ever Lose My Mind"	4:19
10.	"A Face in the Crowd"	6:24
11.	"Feels Like Treason"	3:32
12.	"Blood on Your Barbed Wire Thorns"	6:57

Bonus DVD
No.	Title	Length
1.	"Interview with the band"
2.	"Live Archive"
3.	"Les Mors Dansant"
4.	"Lyrics & Artwork"

== Personnel ==
- Tony Clarkin – guitar
- Bob Catley – vocals
- Al Barrow – bass guitar
- Mark Stanway – keyboards
- Harry James – drums

== Charts ==
Chart (2009)	Peak position
German Albums (Offizielle Top 100)	59
Swedish Albums (Sverigetopplistan)	41
Swiss Albums (Schweizer Hitparade)	59
Scottish Albums (OCC)	86
UK Albums (OCC)	82
UK Independent Albums (OCC)	8
UK Rock & Metal Albums (OCC)	2
