= The Visitation (Magnum album) =

Studio album by Magnum
- Released: 14 January 2011
- Recorded: M2 Studios, Coven, Staffordshire
- Genre: Hard rock
- Length: 57:01
- Label: SPV/Steamhammer
- Producer: Tony Clarkin

Magnum chronology
Into the Valley of the Moonking (2009)	The Visitation (2011)	Evolution (2011)

Professional ratings
Review scores
Source	Rating
AllMusic	3/5 stars
Classic Rock	5/10 stars

The Visitation is the 16th studio album by the English rock band Magnum, released in 2011 by SPV. The album registered the following chart positions: Germany No. 19, Sweden No. 28, UK No. 55, and Switzerland No. 56.

The cover was painted by Rodney Matthews. It refers to the track Doors to Nowhere, in which Tony Clarkin looks back at his childhood. According to Catley, the album was heavier than the previous one, with more emphasis on guitars. Clarkin commented,

This release sounds more rock-oriented and at the same time more personal than anything we've recorded so far, and it definitely features the widest range of stylistic directions and atmospheres. What makes it so special is the fact that the music's arrangements match the atmosphere and the lyrics' statements.

== Track listing ==
All tracks are written by Tony Clarkin.

Original 2011 release
No.	Title	Length
1.	"Black Skies"	5:53
2.	"Doors to Nowhere"	5:43
3.	"The Visitation"	5:48
4.	"Wild Angels"	5:41
5.	"Spin Like a Wheel"	7:21
6.	"The Last Frontier"	5:29
7.	"Freedom Day"	6:22
8.	"Mother Nature's Final Dance"	5:04
9.	"Midnight Kings"	4:49
10.	"Tonight's the Night"	4:53

Bonus DVD
No.	Title	Length
1.	"Brand New Morning" (live at the High Voltage Festival 2010)
2.	"Les Morts Dansant" (live at the High Voltage Festival 2010)
3.	"All My Bridges" (live at the High Voltage Festival 2010)
4.	"When We Were Younger" (live at the High Voltage Festival 2010)
5.	"Eyes Like Fire - Footage" (this is one of the tracks that didn't make the album)
6.	"Behind the artwork video with Al Barrow"
7.	"Rodney Matthews artwork"
8.	"Photo galleries"
9.	"The Visitation lyrics"
10.	"Moonblog - Montage"

== Personnel ==
- Tony Clarkin – guitar
- Bob Catley – vocals
- Al Barrow – bass guitar
- Mark Stanway – keyboards
- Harry James – drums

== Charts ==
Chart (2011)	Peak position
German Albums (Offizielle Top 100)	19
Swedish Albums (Sverigetopplistan)	28
Swiss Albums (Schweizer Hitparade)	56
Scottish Albums (Official Charts)	59
UK Albums (Official Charts)	55
UK Independent Albums (Official Charts)	5
UK Rock & Metal Albums (Official Charts)	3
