= On the 13th Day =

Studio album by Magnum
- Released: 21 September 2012
- Genre: Hard rock
- Length: 57:35
- Label: SPV/Steamhammer
- Producer: Tony Clarkin

Magnum chronology
Evolution (2011)	On the 13th Day (2012)	Escape from the Shadow Garden (2014)

Singles from Magnum
- 1. "Let It Rain"

On the 13th Day is the 17th studio album by the British rock band Magnum (including Keeping the Nite Light Burning and ignoring Evolution), which was released in September 2012, under the label of Steamhammer Records/SPV. The cover artwork was painted by Rodney Matthews.

The album entered the charts at number 3 in the UK Rock & Metal Charts, number 5 in the UK Indie Charts, number 28 in the German Album Charts, #36 Swedish Album Charts, #43 UK Album Charts during its first week, making it their most successful album since their reformation in 2002 at the time of its release. The song "Let It Rain" was released as the first single from the album.

Bob Catley stated that he considers On the 13th Day to be Magnum's rockiest album to date, with the track "Dance of the Black Tattoo" possibly classifying as a heavy metal song.

== Track listing ==
All tracks are written by Tony Clarkin.

Original 2012 release
No.	Title	Length
1.	"All the Dreamers"	7:09
2.	"Blood Red Laughter"	4:40
3.	"Didn't Like You Anyway"	4:33
4.	"On the 13th Day"	5:36
5.	"So Let It Rain"	4:50
6.	"Dance of the Black Tattoo"	5:17
7.	"Shadow Town"	5:57
8.	"Putting Things in Place"	4:41
9.	"Broken Promises"	4:53
10.	"See How They Fall"	4:57
11.	"From Within"	4:42

== Bonus disc 2 ==
No.	Title	Length
1.	"Those Were the Days (demo from 1988/9)"	4:12
2.	"Eyes Like Fire (full version)"	5:23
3.	"Blood Red Laughter (acoustic version)"	4:12
4.	"We All Need to be Loved (live from Prague CZ)"	4:12
5.	"Shadow Town (acoustic version)"	4:59
6.	"Moonking (live from Mannheim D)"	6:29

== Personnel ==
Magnum

- Tony Clarkin – guitar
- Bob Catley – vocals
- Al Barrow – bass guitar
- Mark Stanway – keyboards
- Harry James – drums

Additional musicians

- Sue Parkes, Dan Clark, Susanna Westwood, Tony Nicholl, Mark Carlton, Stacey Green, Kay Savannah, Debby Alexander, Mark Tonks, Katy Jane G. — choir on "From Within"
- Dan Clark — brass on "See How They Fall"

== Charts ==
Chart (2012)	Peak position
German Albums (Offizielle Top 100)	28
Swedish Albums (Sverigetopplistan)	29
Swiss Albums (Schweizer Hitparade)	57
Scottish Albums (OCC)	40
UK Albums (OCC)	43
UK Independent Albums (OCC)	5
UK Rock & Metal Albums (OCC)	3
