= Immortal (Bob Catley album) =

Studio album by Bob Catley
- Released: 22 September 2008
- Recorded: Piranha Studios, Karlsdorf, Germany, 2008
- Genre: Hard rock
- Length: 61:49
- Label: Frontiers Records
- Producer: Dennis Ward

Bob Catley chronology
Spirit of Man (2006)	Immortal (2008)

Immortal is the sixth solo Studio Album by Bob Catley, released by Frontiers Records in 2008.

== Track listing ==
All songs by Magnus Karlsson

1. "Dreamers Unite" - 6:19
2. "We Are Immortal" - 5:44
3. "End of the World" - 5:03
4. "Open Your Eyes" - 4:25
5. "The Searcher" - 5:13
6. "One More Night" - 4:43
7. "Light Up My Way" - 5:42
8. "You Are My Star" - 4:56
9. "War in Heaven" - 4:56
10. "Win the Throne" - 4:21
11. "Haunted" - 4:45
12. "Heat of Passion" - 5:34

== Personnel ==
- Bob Catley - vocals
- Dennis Ward - all guitars (except solos on tracks 3, 4, 5, 6, and 9), bass guitar and additional keyboards
- Uwe Reitenauer - additional guitars on tracks 1, 5, 8, 9, guitar solos on tracks 4, 5, 6, 9
- Magnus Karlsson - keyboards, guitar solo on track 3
- Dirk Bruinenberg - drums

== Production ==
- Produced, recorded, mixed and mastered by Dennis Ward
- Executive producer Serafino Perugino
