= Stronghold (Magnum album) =

Live album by Magnum
- Released: 1997
- Length: Disc 1: 64:14; Disc 2: 59:14
- Label: SPV
- Producer: Mark Stuart; Magnum

Magnum chronology
The Last Dance (1996)	Stronghold (1997)	Road to Paradise: Anthology 1978–83 (1998)

Stronghold is a live album by the English rock band Magnum, released in 1997 by SPV. It is the UK re-release of The Last Dance, which originally was only distributed in mainland Europe. This edition included bonus tracks.

Sanctuary Records released a remastered and expanded edition in 2007, along with Magnum's first six albums. The deluxe packaging has new sleeve notes and an exclusive interview with Tony Clarkin.

== Track listing ==
All tracks are written by Tony Clarkin, except where noted.

Disc 1
No.	Title	Length
1.	"Introduction"	1:40
2.	"Changes"	3:40
3.	"Back to Earth"	3:57
4.	"Just Like an Arrow"	4:00
5.	"Love's a Stranger"	5:46
6.	"Les Morts Dansants"	5:49
7.	"Two Hearts"	6:33
8.	"Rock Heavy"	4:52
9.	"How Far Jerusalem"	10:59
10.	"The Tall Ships"	8:16

Bonus tracks
No.	Title	Length
11.	"The Spirit"	5:22
12.	"Days of No Trust"	5:00

Disc 2
No.	Title	Writer(s)	Length
1.	"Wild Swan"		6:18
2.	"Start Talking Love"		4:30
3.	"Rockin' Chair"	Tony Clarkin, Russ Ballard	4:38
4.	"Vigilante"		5:35
5.	"Kingdom of Madness"		7:21
6.	"Drum Solo (End To End)"		5:24
7.	"Tell Tale Eyes"		5:14
8.	"The Last Dance"		5:02
9.	"Sacred Hour"		5:46

Bonus tracks
No.	Title	Length
10.	"Only In America" (Live at Birmingham Town Hall 1992)	4:19
11.	"You're The One" (Live at Birmingham Town Hall 1992)	4:49

== Cover sleeve ==
The cover art was designed by Rodney Matthews.

== Personnel ==
- Tony Clarkin — guitar
- Bob Catley — vocals
- Wally Lowe — bass guitar
- Mark Stanway — keyboards
- Mickey Barker — drums
