= The Spirit (album) =

Live album by Magnum
- Released: 2 September 1991
- Length: 75:45
- Label: Polydor
- Producers: John Halke; Magnum

Magnum chronology
Goodnight L.A. (1990)	The Spirit (1991)	Sleepwalking (1992)

Professional ratings
Review scores
Source	Rating
Metal Hammer	5/5 stars

The Spirit is a live album by the English rock band Magnum, released in 1991 by Polydor.

Recorded during the Goodnight L.A. tour, the selection of recordings was made according to the band's live set. The band selected the recording that they were most happy with. Although it was originally intended to be a double CD covering Magnum's full set at the time, it was changed to a single disc to cut costs. The Spirit European Tour started in U.K. with dates in September 1991 and continued through Scandinavia, Germany and Switzerland in October 1991.

== Track listing ==
All tracks are written by Tony Clarkin, except where noted.

Original 1991 release
No.	Title	Writer(s)	Length
1.	"Introduction"		1:40
2.	"Vigilante"		5:37
3.	"Days Of No Trust"		4:26
4.	"Mama"		4:31
5.	"Need A Lot Of Love"		5:07
6.	"Pray For The Day"		4:30
7.	"Les Mort Dansant"		5:01
8.	"Reckless Man"		3:04
9.	"How Far Jerusalem"		8:16
10.	"The Spirit"		5:01
11.	"On A Storyteller's Night"		5:14
12.	"Rockin' Chair"	Tony Clarkin, Russ Ballard	4:29
13.	"Kingdom Of Madness"		4:54
14.	"Sacred Hour"		5:13
15.	"When The World Comes Down"		6:07

== Personnel ==
- Tony Clarkin — guitar, backing vocals
- Bob Catley — vocals
- Wally Lowe — bass guitar, backing vocals
- Mark Stanway — keyboards
- Mickey Barker — drums

== Charts ==
Chart (1991)	Peak position
Swedish Albums (Sverigetopplistan)	32
UK Albums (Official Charts)	50
