= Live at the Gods (Bob Catley album) =

Official Bootleg: Live at the Gods

Live album by Bob Catley
- Released: 1999
- Recorded: The Gods '98; Maximes, Wigan, United Kingdom; 15 November 1999
- Genre: Hard rock
- Length: 68:02
- Label: Now & Then / Frontiers
- Producer: Gary Hughes

Bob Catley chronology
| The Tower (1998) | Official Bootleg: Live at the Gods (1999) | Legends (1999) |

Professional ratings
Review scores
| Source | Rating |
|---|---|
| MelodicRock.com | 8/10 stars |
| Melodic.net | 3/5 stars |

Live at the Gods is a live album by Bob Catley. Recorded at The Gods 98, Wigan, UK, 15 November 1998, this disc was included on the Japanese release of Bob's first solo album The Tower. It was released by Now & Then Records in 1999.

== Track listing ==
All songs written by Gary Hughes except where noted.

1. "Dreams" — 6:46
2. "Scream" — 7:11
3. "Far Away" — 7:15
4. "Deep Winter" — 5:13
5. "Lonely Night" (Tony Clarkin) — 3:58
6. "Fire and Ice" — 4:55
7. "On a Storyteller's Night" (Tony Clarkin) — 4:48
8. "The Tower" — 6:26
9. "Fear of the Dark" — 7:37
10. "Just Like an Arrow" (Tony Clarkin) — 3:53

== Personnel ==
- Bob Catley — Vocals
- Vinny Burns — Guitar
- Paul Hodson — Keyboards
- Murray Daigle — Vocals, Guitar
- Mike Dmitrovic — Rhythm Guitar
- Sean Gregory — Bass
- Kyle Lazenka — Drums

== Production ==
- Engineered by Royston Hollyer
- Mixing by Audu Obaje
- Mastered by Jon Blamire
