= Road to Paradise: Anthology 1978–83 =

Road to Paradise

Compilation album by Magnum
- Released: 1998
- Recorded: 1978–1983
- Length: Disc 1: 76:46; Disc 2: 75:06
- Label: Castle Communications
- Producer: Jake Commander; Leo Lyons; Jeff Glixman; Tony Clarkin

Magnum chronology
Stronghold (1997)	Road to Paradise (1998)	Days of Wonder (2000)

Road to Paradise: Anthology 1978–83 is a compilation album by the English rock band Magnum. It was released in 1998 by Castle Communications. At the time of its release, there had been a number of poorly produced compilations of Magnum's older Jet Records material. This compilation was an attempt to remedy this, including all of the A-sides and B-sides released by Jet Records as well as a selection of material chosen by fans via the Internet.

The album is a collection of tracks selected from Kingdom of Madness, Magnum II, Marauder, Chase the Dragon and The Eleventh Hour as well as B-sides and EP tracks from 1978 to 1983.

== Track listing ==
All tracks are written by Tony Clarkin

Disc 1
No.	Title	Length
1.	"Kingdom of Madness" (LP version)	4:25
2.	"In the Beginning" (Edit)	4:17
3.	"Invasion" (LP version)	3:22
4.	"Universe" (LP version)	3:45
5.	"Lonesome Star" (B-side)	3:13
6.	"Foolish Heart" (LP version)	3:13
7.	"Baby Rock Me" (LP version)	3:44
8.	"All of My Life" (Live)	6:17
9.	"Great Adventure" (Live)	4:24
10.	"Invasion" (Live)	3:55
11.	"Kingdom of Madness" (Live)	4:10
12.	"Changes" (Remix)	4:11
13.	"Everybody Needs" (B-side)	2:52
14.	"The Lights Burned Out" (LP version)	4:32
15.	"Long Days Black Nights" (B-side)	3:11
16.	"Back to Earth" (A-side)	3:39
17.	"Hold Back Your Love" (A-side)	3:22
18.	"Soldier of the Line" (Live)	3:51
19.	"Sacred Hour" (Live)	5:45

Disc 2
No.	Title	Length
1.	"All That Is Real" (LP version)	3:48
2.	"All Come Together" (LP version)	4:53
3.	"Great Adventure" (LP version)	4:54
4.	"The Battle" (LP version)	2:10
5.	"If I Could Live Forever" (LP version)	4:02
6.	"Changes" (LP version)	3:15
7.	"Firebird" (LP version)	4:47
8.	"Foolish Heart" (Live)	3:08
9.	"In the Beginning" (Live)	7:57
10.	"Lords of Chaos" (Live)	3:48
11.	"On the Edge of the World" (LP version)	4:22
12.	"The Spirit" (LP version)	4:17
13.	"The Teacher" (LP version)	3:21
14.	"So Far Away" (LP version)	4:35
15.	"One Night of Passion" (LP version)	3:48
16.	"The Word" (LP version)	4:54
17.	"The Prize" (LP version)	3:39
18.	"Road to Paradise" (LP version)	3:30

== Personnel ==
- Tony Clarkin — guitar
- Bob Catley — vocals
- Wally Lowe — bass guitar
- Richard Bailey — keyboards, flute
- Kex Gorin — drums
- Mark Stanway — keyboards
