= Days of Wonder (album) =

Live album by Magnum
- Released: April 2000
- Recorded: The Railway Hotel, Birmingham; United Kingdom; 1976
- Length: 66:46
- Label: River Records
- Producer: Tony Clarkin

Magnum chronology
Road to Paradise: Anthology 1978–83 (1998)	Days of Wonder (2000)	Breath of Life (2002)

Days of Wonder — Live 1976 is a live album by the English rock band Magnum. It was released in 2000 by Zoom Club.

This album was recorded at The Railway Inn in Birmingham in 1976. It represents one of the first shows by Magnum, with original material, much of which was not released until Kingdom Of Madness in 1978 and Magnum II in 1979. Although most of their first album, Kingdom Of Madness, was finished, it was not released until 1978. Magnum performed a regular set at The Railway Inn, so there is no accurate date for when this recording was made.

Originally, Tony Clarkin hesitated to authorise this release of this recording, as Magnum's back catalogue had already been reissued, along with many unofficial compilations without the band's authorisation. CD inlay notes say that one of Clarkin's friends found the early recording in his loft. The recording was made by Andrew Hayes on a Studer Revox tape recorder.

== Track listing ==
All tracks are written by Tony Clarkin, except where noted

Original 2000 release
No.	Title	Writer(s)	Length
1.	"Invasion"		3:24
2.	"Everybody Needs"		3:03
3.	"Master of Disguise"		3:06
4.	"Kingdom of Madness"		3:54
5.	"Universe"		3:28
6.	"Baby Rock Me"		3:54
7.	"Movin' On"		3:59
8.	"Find the Time"		3:03
9.	"Stormbringer"		3:27
10.	"Without Your Love"		4:10
11.	"Lords of Chaos/All Come Together"		8:18
12.	"Runaround Sue"	Dion DiMucci, Ernie Maresca	3:07
13.	"In the Beginning"		2:57
14.	"All of My Life"		4:39
15.	"The Battle"		2:11

== Personnel ==
- Tony Clarkin — guitar
- Bob Catley — vocals
- Wally Lowe — bass
- Richard Bailey — keyboards, flute
- Kex Gorin — drums
