= Legends (Bob Catley album) =

Studio album by Bob Catley
- Released: 22 November 1999
- Recorded: Startrack Studios, Manchester; GH Production Studios, Rossall; The Viper Room, Oldham, United Kingdom, 1999
- Genre: Hard rock
- Length: 56:11
- Label: Frontiers Records
- Producer: Gary Hughes

Bob Catley chronology
| Live at the Gods (1999) | Legends (1999) | Middle Earth (2001) |

Professional ratings
Review scores
| Source | Rating |
|---|---|
| Metal Archives | 8/10 stars |
| HeavyHarmonies | 9/10 stars |
| MelodicRock.com | 9/10 stars |

Legends is the second solo studio album by Bob Catley, released by Frontiers Records in 1999.

The album's songs are based on legendary characters and literature, (Homer, Dracula, The Phantom of the Opera, etc..).

== Track listing ==
All songs written by Gary Hughes.

1. "The Pain" — 5:40
2. "Shelter from the Night" — 4:58
3. "Carpe Diem" — 6:09
4. "Tender Is the Night" — 5:20
5. "Medusa" — 4:54
6. "Hydra" — 5:20
7. "A Beautiful Night for Love" — 5:41
8. "Too Late" — 6:16
9. "The Light" — 8:39
10. "Where the Heart Is" — 3:14

== Personnel ==
- Bob Catley — vocals
- Gary Hughes — vocals, keyboards
- Vinny Burns — guitars
- Steve McKenna — bass
- John Cooksey — drums

== Production ==
- Produced by Gary Hughes
- Mixing by Audu Obaje and Gary Hughes
- Engineered by Audu Obaje
- Additional Engineering by Neil Amison, Alex Tomlin, Vinny Burns and Gary Hughes
