= When Empires Burn =

Studio album by Bob Catley
- Released: 26 May 2003
- Recorded: Tent Studios, Stourbridge, United Kingdom; 2002 — 2003
- Genre: Heavy Metal, Hard rock
- Length: 57:30
- Label: Frontiers Records
- Producer: Paul Hodson

Bob Catley chronology
Middle Earth (2001)	When Empires Burn (2003)	Spirit of Man (2006)

Professional ratings
Review scores
Source	Rating
Metal Archives	(9.4/10)
Melodic.net	4/5 stars

When Empires Burn is the fourth solo studio album by Bob Catley, released by Frontiers Records in 2003.

== Track listing ==
All songs written by Paul Hodson.

1. "The Torment" — 1:53
2. "Children of the Circle" — 5:40
3. "Gonna Live Forever" — 3:39
4. "The Prophecy" — 6:36
5. "I'll Be Your Fool" — 4:34
6. "Every Beat of My Heart" — 5:36
7. "When Empires Burn" — 5:33
8. "Meaning of Love" — 4:49
9. "This Is the Day" — 6:21
10. "Someday Utopia" — 5:41
11. "My America" — 7:08

=== Bonus Tracks on Digipack edition ===
12. "Heaven Can Wait" - 4:08
13. "When the Earth Lies Still" [Demo] - 4:07

== Personnel ==
- Bob Catley — Vocals
- Paul Hodson — Vocals, Keyboards
- Al Barrow — Bass
- Vince O'Regan — Guitar
- Jamie Little — Drums

== Production ==
- Written, Engineered and Produced by Paul Hodson
- Mixing by Paul Hodson, Assisted by Bob Catley
