= Brand New Morning (Magnum album) =

Studio album by Magnum
- Released: August 2004
- Recorded: 2003–2004
- Studio: Mad Hat Studios, Wolverhampton
- Genre: Hard rock
- Length: 55:21
- Label: SPV
- Producer: Tony Clarkin

Magnum chronology
The River Sessions (2004)	Brand New Morning (2004)	Princess Alice and the Broken Arrow (2007)

Professional ratings
Review scores
Source	Rating
Kerrang!	4/5 stars
MelodicRock.com	(8.7/10)

Brand New Morning is the 13th studio album by the English rock band Magnum, released in 2004 by SPV.

"We All Run" is an apocalyptic song. "It's actually about the nuclear holocaust", Tony Clarkin explained. "The idea of the song is we all ignore the important things in life. And the actual verse is that it is really poetic license trying to create a picture "We all run" as "We don't care anymore". Like the cities are burning, like people are starving to death. That's what it means."

The lyrics to "Brand New Morning" can be considered as a reflection by Clarkin, following the heart attack he suffered in 2002. Bob Catley commented, "We are a heavy lyric band. With the song "Brand New Morning" it is like the first day of the rest of your life. Forget everything else. Just wake up with the sun shining and start living. That is what 'Brand New Morning' is all about."

The album marks the final departure from the style of Hard Rain. According to Bob Catley, Brand New Morning can be considered as the "real" return of Magnum following the 1995–2001 split, as it took Clarkin one album to get back into writing for Magnum.

== Track listing ==
All tracks are written by Tony Clarkin.

Original 2004 release
No.	Title	Length
1.	"Brand New Morning"	6:17
2.	"It's Time to Come Together"	4:37
3.	"We All Run"	4:53
4.	"The Blue and the Grey"	5:54
5.	"I'd Breathe for You"	6:27
6.	"The Last Goodbye"	6:28
7.	"Immigrant Son"	5:35
8.	"Hard Road"	5:21
9.	"The Scarecrow"	9:50

Japanese bonus track
No.	Title	Length
10.	"Dreamland"	5:37

== Personnel ==
- Tony Clarkin – guitar
- Bob Catley – vocals
- Al Barrow – bass guitar
- Mark Stanway – keyboards
- Harry James – drums

== Charts ==
Chart (2004)	Peak position
German Albums (Offizielle Top 100)	60
UK Rock & Metal Albums (OCC)	13
