= The Monster Roars =

Studio album by Magnum
- Released: 14 January 2022
- Recorded: 2021
- Genre: Hard rock
- Length: 58:27
- Label: Steamhammer Records/SPV
- Producer: Tony Clarkin

Magnum chronology
Dance of the Black Tattoo (2021)	The Monster Roars (2022)	Here Comes the Rain (2024)

Professional ratings
Review scores
Source	Rating
Metal Hammer	4.5/5 stars

The Monster Roars is the 22nd studio album by English rock band Magnum, released on 14 January 2022.

The first single, "I Won't Let You Down", was released on 12 November 2021, followed by a second, "No Steppin' Stones", on 17 December 2021. A long-postponed European tour followed the release, which was their first since 2019, and their last before Tony Clarkin's death in 2024.

== Track listing ==
All tracks are written by Tony Clarkin.

The Monster Roars track listing
No.	Title	Length
1.	"The Monster Roars"	3:57
2.	"Remember"	5:05
3.	"All You Believe In"	5:01
4.	"I Won't Let You Down"	3:57
5.	"The Present Not the Past"	5:27
6.	"No Steppin' Stones"	4:09
7.	"That Freedom Word"	4:52
8.	"Your Blood Is Violence"	6:44
9.	"Walk the Silent Hours"	4:51
10.	"The Day After the Night Before"	4:23
11.	"Come Holy Men"	5:01
12.	"Can't Buy Yourself a Heaven"	5:00

== Bonus CD ==
Included in the box set, released on Jan 14, 2022
No.	Title	Length
1.	"Days of No Trust 2021"	4:46
2.	"Sweets For My Sweet"	5:18
3.	"Track Number Three"	4:29

== Personnel ==
- Tony Clarkin – guitar
- Bob Catley – vocals
- Dennis Ward – bass guitar
- Rick Benton – keyboards
- Lee Morris – drums

== Charts ==
Chart performance for The Monster Roars
Chart (2022)	Peak position
Austrian Albums (Ö3 Austria)	34
German Albums (Offizielle Top 100)	5
Scottish Albums (OCC)	9
Swedish Albums (Sverigetopplistan)	29
Swiss Albums (Schweizer Hitparade)	7
UK Albums (OCC)	51
UK Independent Albums (OCC)	4
UK Rock & Metal Albums (OCC)	2
