= The Tower (Bob Catley album) =

Studio album by Bob Catley
- Released: 6 November 1998
- Recorded: Startrack Studios, Manchester, United Kingdom; 1997
- Genre: Hard rock
- Length: 57:57
- Label: Frontiers
- Producer: Gary Hughes

Bob Catley chronology
The Tower (1998)	Live at the Gods (1999)

Professional ratings
Review scores
Source	Rating
AOR Hard Rock Hotspot	9.4/10
Classic Rock Magazine	8/10 stars
HeavyHarmonies	8.5/10 stars
Mood Swings	9/10 stars
Scream Magazine	5/6

The Tower is the debut solo studio album by Bob Catley, released by Frontiers Records in 1998.

Bob Catley collaborated with Ten frontman, and longstanding Magnum fan, Gary Hughes who wrote all the songs on The Tower. He wrote the songs having in mind classic Magnum tunes and trying to combine the epic scope of On a Storyteller's Night with Wings of Heaven commercial appeal.

"I dug out all my classic old Magnum records and they inspired me to write in this style for Bob. Tony Clarkin is such a great writer. I think he's one of the most underrated writers around. Songs like "Les Mort Dansant" and "How Far Jerusalem" are simply stunning pieces of songwriting." — Gary Hughes

== Track listing ==
All songs written by Gary Hughes.

=== Disc 1 ===
1. "Dreams" — 6:46
2. "Scream" — 7:32
3. "Far Away" — 6:01
4. "Deep Winter" — 5:25
5. "Fire and Ice" — 5:33
6. "Madrigal" — 6:43
7. "Steel" — 5:00
8. "The Tower" — 6:33
9. "Fear of the Dark" — 6:31
10. "Epilogue" [Instrumental] — 1:53

=== Disc 2 (Japanese Release) ===
1. "Dreams" [Live] — 6:46
2. "Scream" [Live] — 7:32
3. "Far Away" [Live] — 6:01
4. "Deep Winter" [Live] — 5:25
5. "Lonely Night" [Live] (Tony Clarkin) — 0:00
6. "Fire and Ice" [Live] — 5:33
7. "On a Storyteller's Night" [Live] (Tony Clarkin) — 0:00
8. "The Tower" [Live] — 6:33
9. "Fear of the Dark" [Live] — 6:31
10. "Just Like an Arrow" [Live] (Tony Clarkin) — 0:00

== Personnel ==
- Bob Catley — vocals
- Gary Hughes — vocals, bass, keyboards
- Vinny Burns — guitars
- Greg Morgan — drums

== Production ==
- Produced by Gary Hughes
- Engineered and Mixing by Ray Brophy
- Recorded at Startrack Studios, Manchester
- Mixed at Gracieland, Rochdale
- Mastered by John Blamire at The Digital Audio Company
- Additional Engineering by Neil Amison at Gracieland, Rochdale
