= Lost on the Road to Eternity =

Studio album by Magnum
- Released: 19 January 2018
- Genre: Hard rock
- Length: 66:53
- Label: Steamhammer Records/SPV
- Producer: Tony Clarkin

Magnum chronology
The Valley of Tears – The Ballads (2017)	Lost on the Road to Eternity (2018)	Live at the Symphony Hall (2019)

Lost on the Road to Eternity is the 20th studio album by the British rock band Magnum. The album was released on 19 January 2018. It is the group's first album to feature Lee Morris on drums and Rick Benton on keyboards. It is also the longest studio album the band has released to date (not counting bonus tracks).

The album features Tobias Sammet on the title track, an artistic thank you by the Avantasia frontman for Bob Catley's numerous guest appearances on his albums. It was the last studio album by Magnum to feature bassist Al Barrow, as he retired from the band a year and a half after the album's release.

The cover was painted by Rodney Matthews, and features almost every character from The Wizard of Oz and Lewis Carroll's Alice's Adventures in Wonderland.

Commercially, Lost on the Road to Eternity became one of the most successful Magnum albums to date, and it was well-received by critics across Europe. It became the first Magnum album to reach the Top 10 in the German charts and the second to do so in the Swiss charts, peaking at 8 in both. It also charted 15 in the United Kingdom, the band's highest position there since 1990. The album entered charts in France and the United States, a first in the band's history.

== Song themes ==
"Peaches and Cream" is about life not being as easy as people say; one has to work hard to earn success.

"Show Me Your Hands" is about Magnum's loyal fan base. Tony Clarkin was inspired to write the song after performing in front of a very enthusiastic audience on a tour in Germany.

"Storm Baby" is a love song.

"Welcome to the Cosmic Cabaret" was inspired by the city of Istanbul, which Clarkin describes as a "magical city" due to all the history that unfolded there, stretching back to the time of the Roman Empire.

"Lost on the Road to Eternity" is about people being lost and needing guidance in life, "the road to eternity" being an analogy for life. The theme on the album cover is taken from this track.

"Without Love" is about children in Third World countries who grow up without their parents, hence "without love". The song was partly inspired by pictures taken by Clarkin's son-in-law while travelling in Vietnam; the cover of the single is from this collection, featuring a child who had just asked him for chocolate.

"Tell Me What You've Got to Say" is about people who talk badly about others in public, instead of speaking with them directly. Clarkin described it as a song about "people who cause you problems".

"Ya Wanna Be Someone" is about being conceited and narcissistic.

"Forbidden Masquerade" is about drinking problems, which Clarkin himself used to have, and about how much better life gets once one overcomes them.

"Glory to Ashes" is an anti-war song.

"King of the World" is about founding figures of the great religions and how people worship them. The song is not a critique of religion, but rather an expression of fascination with those individuals. Although the song makes several references that clearly point to Jesus (scarlet robe, the kiss of Judas), Clarkin stated that the message could apply to Christianity, Islam and other religions alike.

== Track listing ==
All tracks are written by Tony Clarkin.

Original 2018 CD release
No.	Title	Length
1.	"Peaches and Cream"	4:54
2.	"Show Me Your Hands"	5:45
3.	"Storm Baby"	6:13
4.	"Welcome to the Cosmic Cabaret"	8:08
5.	"Lost on the Road to Eternity" (featuring Tobias Sammet)	5:54
6.	"Without Love"	5:55
7.	"Tell Me What You've Got to Say"	6:27
8.	"Ya Wanna Be Someone"	5:56
9.	"Forbidden Masquerade"	5:02
10.	"Glory to Ashes"	5:35
11.	"King of the World"	7:04

Bonus live disc
No.	Title	Length
12.	"Sacred Blood, Divine Lies" (live)	6:48
13.	"Crazy Old Mothers" (live)	5:35
14.	"Your Dreams Won't Die" (live)	5:56
15.	"Twelve Men Wise and Just" (live)	6:21

== Personnel ==
- Tony Clarkin – guitar
- Bob Catley – vocals
- Al Barrow – bass guitar
- Rick Benton – keyboards
- Lee Morris – drums
- Tobias Sammet – guest vocals

== Charts ==
Chart (2018)	Peak position
Austrian Albums (Ö3 Austria)	22
Belgian Albums (Ultratop Wallonia)	183
German Albums (Offizielle Top 100)	8
Scottish Albums (OCC)	9
Swedish Albums (Sverigetopplistan)	23
Swiss Albums (Schweizer Hitparade)	8
UK Albums (OCC)	15
UK Independent Albums (OCC)	1
UK Rock & Metal Albums (OCC)	7
