= Middle Earth (album) =

Studio album by Bob Catley
- Released: 26 March 2001
- Recorded: Startrack Studios, Manchester; GH Production Studios, Rossall; The Viper Room, Oldham, United Kingdom, 2000
- Genre: Hard rock
- Length: 56:00
- Label: Frontiers Records
- Producer: Gary Hughes

Bob Catley chronology
Legends (1999)	Middle Earth (2001)	When Empires Burn (2003)

Professional ratings
Review scores
Source	Rating
MelodicRock.com	(9.4/10)
HeavyHarmonies	8/10 stars

Middle Earth is the third solo studio album by Bob Catley, released by Frontiers Records in 2000.

The album draws upon J.R.R. Tolkien's The Lord of the Rings for inspiration. The original title for the album given to the music press was Lord of the Rings.

== Track listing ==
All songs written by Gary Hughes.

1. "The Wraith of the Rings" — 7:05
2. (i) "The Fields That I Recall" — 0:00
  (ii) "Emissary" — 0:00
  (iii) "The Fields That I Recall (Reprise)" — 8:02
3. "City Walls" — 6:11
4. "Against the Wind" — 5:15
5. (i) "Where You Lead I'll Follow" — 0:00
  (ii) "Stormcrow and Pilgrim" — 0:00
  (iii) "Where You Lead I'll Follow (Reprise)" — 8:47
6. "Return of the Mountain King" — 6:40
7. "The End of Summer (Galadriel's Theme)" — 5:51
8. "This Gallant Band of Manic Strangers" — 3:46
9. "The Fellowship" — 4:23

== Personnel ==
- Bob Catley — vocals
- Gary Hughes — vocals, keyboards
- Vinny Burns — guitars
- Steve McKenna — bass
- John Cooksey — drums

=== Additional Musicians ===
- Tracey Hitchings — vocals (on "Against the Wind")

== Production ==
- Produced by Gary Hughes
- Mixing by Audu Obaje
- Engineered by Audu Obaje, Kirk Podmore, Vinny Burns and Gary Hughes
