= Spirit of Man =

Studio album by Bob Catley
- Released: 2006
- Recorded: KRT Studios; Wolverhampton; United Kingdom; 2005
- Genre: Hard rock
- Length: 61:58
- Label: Frontiers Records
- Producer: Vince O'Regan; Bob Catley

Bob Catley chronology
When Empires Burn (2003)	Spirit of Man (2006)	Immortal (2008)

Professional ratings
Review scores
Source	Rating
Melodic.net	4/5 stars
HeavyHarmonies	8.5/10 stars

Spirit of Man is the fifth solo studio album by Bob Catley, released by Frontiers Records in 2006.

== Track listing ==
1. "Heart of Stone" (Dave Thompson, Paul Uttley, Vince O'Regan) — 5:23
2. "Moment of Truth" (Dave Thompson, Paul Uttley) — 5:13
3. "In The Name of the Cause" (Dave Thompson, Paul Uttley) — 4:45
4. "Blinded by a Lie" (Vince O'Regan) — 4:57
5. "Last Snows of Winter" (Dave Thompson, Paul Uttley) — 4:47
6. "Spirit of Man" (Dave Thompson, Paul Uttley) — 6:23
7. "The Fire Within Me" (Dave Thompson, Paul Uttley) — 5:04
8. "Judgement Day" (Dave Thompson, Paul Uttley) — 4:24
9. "Lost to the Night" (Vince O'Regan) — 4:19
10. "Beautiful Mind" (Dave Thompson, Paul Uttley, Irvin Parratt) — 4:32
11. "Walk on Water" (Vince O'Regan) — 7:47
12. "End of the Story" (Dave Thompson, Paul Uttley, Irvin Parratt) — 4:24

Bonus Tracks on Japanese Release:

13. "Temptation" (Vince O'Regan) — 5:03

== Personnel ==
- Bob Catley — Vocals
- Vince O'Regan — Guitar
- Al Barrow — Bass
- Jamie Little — Drums
- Irvin Parratt — Keyboards
- Dave Thompson — Rhythm Guitar

== Production ==
- Produced by Vince O'Regan and Bob Catley
- Mixing by Vince O'Regan
