= Wings of Heaven Live =

2008 live album by Magnum

Live album by Magnum
- Released: 22 February 2008 (Germany); 25 February 2008 (Europe); 8 April 2008 (USA)
- Recorded: Ironworks, Inverness; 10 November 2007 The Garage, Glasgow; 11 November 2007; 53 Degrees, Preston; 12 November 2007; The Junction, Cambridge; 14 November 2007; Picturedrome, Holmfirth; 15 November 2007; The Academy, Birmingham; 17 November 2007 Astoria 2, London; 18 November 2007
- Length: Disc 1: 57:44; Disc 2: 58:45
- Label: SPV
- Producer: Mark Stuart; Tony Clarkin

Magnum chronology
Princess Alice and the Broken Arrow (2007)	Wings of Heaven Live (2008)	Into the Valley of the Moonking (2009)

Wings of Heaven Live is a live album by the English rock band Magnum, released in 2008 by SPV.

The album was recorded on the 20th anniversary tour of Magnum's Wings of Heaven album. The original album was released in 1988 and reached the Top 5 in the UK album charts achieving Silver status in the UK for over 200,000 sales. The album was recorded on the Wings of Heaven Live UK tour, 10 November 2007 – 18 November 2007. The song "Different Worlds" was performed live for the first time during this tour, and was never played by the band on the original Wings of Heaven tour in 1988.

The artwork was illustrated by Rodney Matthews following his sleeve design for Magnum's previous album Princess Alice and the Broken Arrow.

The album is dedicated to Kex Gorin, Magnum's original drummer, who died on 21 December 2007.

== Track listing ==
All tracks are written by Tony Clarkin.

Disc 1
No.	Title	Length
1.	"When We Were Younger"	7:25
2.	"Back Street Kid"	5:33
3.	"Out of the Shadows"	7:18
4.	"Like Brothers We Stand"	5:53
5.	"How Far Jerusalem"	9:41
6.	"Dragons Are Real"	5:39
7.	"All England's Eyes"	4:58
8.	"Vigilante"	5:35
9.	"Kingdom of Madness"	5:42

Disc 2
No.	Title	Length
1.	"Intro"	0:50
2.	"Days of No Trust"	5:07
3.	"Wild Swan"	6:23
4.	"Start Talking Love"	4:47
5.	"One Step Away"	5:16
6.	"It Must Have Been Love"	5:49
7.	"Different Worlds"	5:11
8.	"Pray for the Day"	5:02
9.	"Don't Wake the Lion (Too Old To Die Young)"	11:17
10.	"Sacred Hour"	9:04

iTunes exclusive tracks
No.	Title	Length
11.	"C'est La Vie"	4:32
12.	"Les Morts Dansant"	5:23

== Personnel ==
- Tony Clarkin – guitar
- Bob Catley – vocals
- Al Barrow – bass guitar
- Mark Stanway – keyboards
- Harry James – drums

== Wings of Heaven Live tour ==
First leg (UK)

- 10 November 2007 – Ironworks, Inverness
- 11 November 2007 – The Garage, Glasgow
- 12 November 2007 – 53 Degrees, Preston
- 14 November 2007 – The Junction, Cambridge
- 15 November 2007 – Picturedrome, Holmfirth
- 17 November 2007 – The Academy, Birmingham
- 18 November 2007 – Astoria 2, London
- 10 December 2007 – Robin 2 (Kex Gorin benefit concert), Wolverhampton

Second leg (UK)

- 7 May 2008 – Academy, Bristol
- 8 May 2008 – Wulfrun Hall, Wolverhampton
- 9 May 2008 – Academy, Newcastle
- 10 May 2008 – Academy, Oxford
- 11 May 2008 – Academy, Manchester
- 12 May 2008 – Academy, Sheffield

Third leg (Europe)

- 15 May 2008 – Z7, Pratteln, Switzerland
- 16 May 2008 – Scala, Ludwigsburg, Germany
- 17 May 2008 – Matrix, Bochum, Germany
- 18 May 2008 – Fabrik, Hamburg, Germany
- 19 May 2008 – Colos Saal, Aschaffenburg, Germany
- 21 May 2008 – Elsterhalle, Munich, Germany
- 22 May 2008 – Hirsch, Nurnberg, Germany
- 23 May 2008 – Capitol, Hannover, Germany
- 24 May 2008 – Postbahnhof, Berlin, Germany
- 25 May 2008 – Retro Music Hall, Prague, Czech Republic

Fourth leg (festivals)

- 4 July 2008 – Unterempfenbach open Air, Unterempfenbach, Germany
- 5 July 2008 – Tentfestival, Tuttlingen, Germany
- 26 July 2008 – Rock And Blues Festival, Derby, UK

== Wings of Heaven live set ==
Set 1

1. "When We Were Younger"
2. "Back Street Kid"
3. "Out of the Shadows"
4. "Like Brothers We Stand"
5. "How Far Jerusalem"
6. "Dragons Are Real"
7. "Les Morts Dansant"
8. "All England's Eyes"
9. "Vigilante"
10. "Kingdom of Madness"

Set 2

1. "Days of No Trust"
2. "Wild Swan"
3. "Start Talking Love"
4. "One Step Away"
5. "It Must Have Been Love"
6. "Different Worlds"
7. "Pray for the Day"
8. "Don't Wake the Lion (Too Old To Die Young)"

Encore

1. "Sacred Hour"

== Charts ==
Chart (2008)	Peak position
UK Rock & Metal Albums (OCC)	27
