= The Last Dance (Magnum album) =

Live album by Magnum
- Released: 20 May 1996
- Length: Disc 1: 53:49; Disc 2: 50:30
- Label: SPV
- Producer: Mark Stuart; Magnum

Magnum chronology
| Rock Art (1994) | The Last Dance (1996) | Stronghold (1996) |

The Last Dance is a live album by the English rock band Magnum, released in 1996 by SPV. This is the European release; the UK release was called Stronghold.

== Track listing ==
All tracks are written by Tony Clarkin, except where noted.

Disc 1
| No. | Title | Length |
|---|---|---|
| 1. | "Introduction" | 1:40 |
| 2. | "Changes" | 3:40 |
| 3. | "Back to Earth" | 3:57 |
| 4. | "Just Like an Arrow" | 4:00 |
| 5. | "Love's a Stranger" | 5:46 |
| 6. | "Les Mort Dansant" | 5:49 |
| 7. | "Two Hearts" | 6:33 |
| 8. | "Rock Heavy" | 4:52 |
| 9. | "How Far Jerusalem" | 10:59 |
| 10. | "The Tall Ships" | 8:16 |

Disc 2
| No. | Title | Writer(s) | Length |
|---|---|---|---|
| 1. | "Wild Swan" | | 6:18 |
| 2. | "Start Talking Love" | | 4:30 |
| 3. | "Rockin' Chair" | Tony Clarkin, Russ Ballard | 4:38 |
| 4. | "Vigilante" | | 5:35 |
| 5. | "Kingdom of Madness" | | 7:21 |
| 6. | "Drum Solo (End To End)" | | 5:24 |
| 7. | "Tell Tale Eyes" | | 5:14 |
| 8. | "The Last Dance" | | 5:02 |
| 9. | "Sacred Hour" | | 5:46 |

== Personnel ==
- Tony Clarkin — guitar
- Bob Catley — vocals
- Wally Lowe — bass guitar
- Mark Stanway — keyboards
- Mickey Barker — drums
