= Archive (Magnum album) =

Compilation album by Magnum
- Released: April 1993
- Recorded: 1974 – 1982
- Length: 44:39
- Label: Jet Records
- Producer: Tony Clarkin

Magnum chronology
Sleepwalking (1992)	Archive (1993)	Chapter & Verse – The Very Best of Magnum (1993)

Archive is compilation album by English rock band Magnum. It is a collection of previously unreleased demo and outtake material recorded from 1976 to 1983, and was released in 1993 by Jet Records.

Most of the material released here was used as bonus tracks for Magnum's expanded and remastered series on Sanctuary Records.

== Artwork ==
The cover art was designed by Rodney Matthews.

"Trojan Sales bought second rights on my illustration "Peace... at Last" for use on the Archive album. Tracks include "Sea Bird", "Stormbringer" and "Captain America". – Rodney Matthews

== Track listing ==
All tracks are written by Tony Clarkin

Original 1993 Release
No.	Title	Length
1.	"Sea Bird" (1974 demo)	3:49
2.	"Stormbringer" (1974 demo)	3:31
3.	"Slipping Away" (1974 demo)	3:15
4.	"Captain America" (1974 demo)	3:43
5.	"Master Of Disguise" (Kingdom of Madness session outtake)	2:54
6.	"Without Your Love" (Kingdom of Madness session outtake)	3:54
7.	"Find The Time" (Kingdom of Madness session outtake)	3:04
8.	"Everybody Needs" (Kingdom of Madness session outtake)	3:47
9.	"Kingdom Of Madness" (Alternative recording)	3:56
10.	"Lights Burned Out" (Original version)	4:06
11.	"The Word" (B-side, feat. The London Philharmonic Orchestra)	4:58
12.	"True Fine Love" (The Eleventh Hour session outtake)	3:22

== Personnel ==
- Tony Clarkin – guitar
- Bob Catley – vocals
- Wally Lowe – bass guitar
- Richard Bailey – keyboards, flute
- Kex Gorin – drums
- Dave Morgan – bass guitar, vocals (on tracks 1 – 4)
- Mark Stanway – keyboards (on tracks 10 – 12)
