= Princess Alice and the Broken Arrow =

Studio album by Magnum
- Released: 26 March 2007
- Recorded: 2005–2006
- Studio: Mad Hat Studios, Wolverhampton
- Genre: Hard rock
- Length: 62:47
- Label: SPV
- Producer: Tony Clarkin

Magnum chronology
Brand New Morning (2004)	Princess Alice and the Broken Arrow (2007)	Wings of Heaven Live (2008)

Singles from Princess Alice and the Broken Arrow
- 1. "Like Brothers We Stand" Released: 2007

Professional ratings
Review scores
Source	Rating
AllMusic	3/5 stars
MelodicRock.com	8.5/10 stars

Princess Alice and the Broken Arrow is the 14th studio album by the English rock band Magnum. The album was released by SPV in Germany on 23 March 2007, in the rest of Europe on 26 March 2007 and in the USA on 3 April 2007. The album title refers to the Princess Alice orphanage near Birmingham, with which Tony Clarkin has close personal ties. The album is the first new studio album with Rodney Matthews' artwork since 1992, and the only one to feature Jimmy Copley on drums.

The album entered the UK Album Charts at No. 70, the first time Magnum had charted in the UK since 1994. It also reached No. 4 on the BBC Rock Album Charts and No. 60 in Germany, the band's biggest market outside of the UK along with Scandinavia.

== Track listing ==
All tracks are written by Tony Clarkin.

Original 2007 release
No.	Title	Length
1.	"When We Were Younger"	7:00
2.	"Eyes Wide Open"	5:54
3.	"Like Brothers We Stand"	5:35
4.	"Out of the Shadows"	6:58
5.	"Dragons Are Real"	5:21
6.	"Inside Your Head"	6:01
7.	"Be Strong"	5:40
8.	"Thank You for the Day"	5:10
9.	"Your Lies"	4:34
10.	"Desperate Times"	5:22
11.	"You'll Never Sleep"	4:57

Japanese bonus track
No.	Title	Length
12.	"Like Brothers We Stand" (Radio edit)	3:33

Bonus DVD
No.	Title	Length
1.	"The Making of Princess Alice and the Broken Arrow"
2.	"Interviews with Band Members"
3.	""Dragons Are Real" Recording Studio Video"
4.	"Slideshow"

== Singles ==
Like Brothers We Stand digital (2008)

1. "Like Brothers We Stand" [Radio edit] – 3:31
2. "Your Lies" [LP version] – 4:32

== Cover sleeve ==
The cover art was designed by Rodney Matthews.

"Tony had got this idea of Princess Alice in his head; the name came from the Princess Alice orphanage in Birmingham... although the Alice on the cover, our Princess Alice if you like, is a fictitious character. And it just seemed right to ask Rodney if he would be interested in doing a painting for the front cover instead of using computer graphics which we have used a lot in the recent past. Tony wanted the sly fox in the artwork and Princess Alice breaking the arrow over her head and this was something that had to be done by an artist... so the only man for the job was Rodney Matthews. We went down to his house in Wales and Tony sat down with him and went through his ideas for the cover and Rodney came back to us with this wonderful pencil drawing which knocked us over; it was brilliant in black and white so we knew it would look amazing in colour. Of course with Rodney he was a known quantity for us from Storyteller's Night and those other great covers and so he was the obvious choice. It reminds me a lot of Storyteller's Night and it shouts Magnum at you; I don't think anybody else would have a cover like that really." – Bob Catley, 2007

"The little story there is that Princess Alice is doing a deal with the fox; breaking an arrow over her head is her making peace with the fox which is part of the lyrics in "Like Brothers We Stand". And this song is to do with the Native American Indians making peace with the White Man so that they ended up being shoved into reservations instead of having all of that country to themselves. "The Flood" from Sleepwalking was basically the same subject matter. And then the kids in the background stuck in the cages are all looking sorry for themselves and the Princess is trying to get the kids back as part of her deal. And she also kicked off a song called "You'll Never Sleep" which closes the album that was also part of the very loose Princess Alice concept." – Bob Catley, 2007

"Princess Alice is a fictional character. Her name came from an orphanage in Birmingham, called the Princess Alice Orphanage. It was in Harborne, in Birmingham, many years ago; it's not there anymore. Tony was researching this before we started putting anything down for the album. He wanted to get his facts right, for personal reasons. And the name, Princess Alice kept going around his head, and it helped him put ideas for a song called "You'll Never Sleep", which is the last track on the album. So that kicked off the whole writing process, really. And the fox... Tony always wanted to get the evil sly fox into the artwork somewhere, and now he's got his chance. There's a little story on the front basically, how she is breaking an arrow over her head, which is a peace symbol, obviously. She's trying to do a deal with the fox, to get the little children back, that he has kidnapped and put them in cages in the back; you can see them and they're very forlorn and sad." – Bob Catley, 2007

"Rodney came to the studio and let himself be inspired by us and the album title. He started with some small sketches, eventually producing this beautiful painting." – Bob Catley, 2007

== Personnel ==
- Tony Clarkin – guitar
- Bob Catley – vocals
- Al Barrow – bass guitar
- Mark Stanway – keyboards
- Jimmy Copley – drums

Additional musicians

- Jim Lea – violin on "You'll Never Sleep"

Production

- Produced and written by Tony Clarkin
- Mixed by Tony Clarkin & Mark V. Stuart
- Recorded at M2, Mad Hat Studio by Mark V. Stuart
- Assisted by Sheena Sear
- Mastered by Ian Cooper at Metropolis, London
- Cover artwork by Rodney Matthews
- Other artwork by Al Barrow, Generic Designs
- Publishing – Colin Newman at Maxwood Music Ltd

== Princess Alice and the Broken Arrow tour ==
- 4 May – Lagerhalle, Osnabrueck
- 5 May – Columbia Club, Berlin
- 7 May – Spectrum, Augsburg
- 8 May – Z7, Pratteln
- 10 May – Colos-saal, Aschaffenburg
- 11 May – Capitol, Hanover
- 12 May – Zeche, Bochum
- 13 May – Kantine, Köln
- 14 May – Biebob, Vosselaar
- 15 May – Le Trabendo, Paris
- 17 May – Garage, Glasgow
- 18 May – Carling Academy, Newcastle
- 19 May – Rock City, Nottingham
- 20 May – The Academy, Bristol
- 22 May – The Waterfront, Norwich
- 23 May – The Academy 2, Manchester
- 24 May – Wulfrun Hall, Wolverhampton
- 25 May – Rio's, Leeds
- 26 May – Mean Fiddler, London

== Charts ==
Chart (2007)	Peak position
German Albums (Offizielle Top 100)	60
Scottish Albums (OCC)	58
UK Albums (OCC)	70
UK Rock & Metal Albums (OCC)	4
