= Chapter & Verse – The Very Best of Magnum =

Chapter & Verse

Compilation album by Magnum
- Released: 10 May 1993
- Recorded: 1986–1991
- Length: 75:46
- Label: Polydor
- Producer: Roger Taylor; David Richards; Albert Boekholt; Magnum; Keith Olsen; John Halke

Magnum chronology
Archive (1993)	Chapter & Verse (1993)	Keeping the Nite Light Burning (1993)

Chapter & Verse is a compilation album by the English rock band Magnum, released in 1993 by Polydor.

The album consisted mostly of ordinary studio versions of previously released songs. The cover art includes symbols from previous Magnum albums released by Polydor, including the unicorn from Vigilante and the sword from one of Magnum's band logos.

== Track listing ==
All tracks are written by Tony Clarkin, except where noted

Original 1993 Release
No.	Title	Writer(s)	Length
1.	"Rockin' Chair" (LP version)	Tony Clarkin, Russ Ballard	4:10
2.	"Vigilante" (LP version)		6:40
3.	"C'est la Vie" (B-side)		4:11
4.	"Heartbroke and Busted" (LP version)		3:37
5.	"On a Storyteller's Night" (live)		6:19
6.	"Start Talking Love" (LP version)		3:36
7.	"Mama" (LP version)		4:34
8.	"Lonely Night" (LP version)		3:48
9.	"Crying Time" (B-side)		3:48
10.	"Midnight (You Won't Be Sleeping)" (Remix)		6:20
11.	"It Must Have Been Love" (LP version)		5:16
12.	"Days of No Trust" (LP version)		5:23
13.	"Don't Wake The Lion (Too Old To Die Young)" (LP version)		10:34
14.	"Just Like an Arrow" (Live at Hammersmith Odeon in London, England, 13 March 1987)		3:57
15.	"When the World Comes Down" (LP version)		5:20

== Personnel ==
- Tony Clarkin – guitar
- Bob Catley – vocals
- Wally Lowe – bass guitar
- Mark Stanway – keyboards
- Mickey Barker – drums
