= Zenda Jacks =

British singer

- Also known as: Sue McCloskey
- Born: Suzie McCloskey; 12 July 1955 (age 71); Wednesbury, England
- Occupation: Singer
- Years active: 1974–present
- Label: Magnet Records

Suzie "Sue" McCloskey (born 12 July 1955), better known as Zenda Jacks, is an English singer. She is best known for being a member of the groups Silver Convention and Hard Rain. She has also worked with artists such as Tina Turner and Ella Fitzgerald.

== Career ==
Zenda Jacks trained in ballet from a very young age. As she grew older, she took singing and piano lessons, while also learning how to play the guitar. When she was 17 years old, she was discovered by 2 members of a Birmingham-based band, known as "Muscles". She was later invited to join the band as a singer. In 1974, she released her debut single, Rub My Tummy. She was billed The Goddess of Rock, and seen as the UK's answer to Suzi Quatro. She was invited to perform in TV shows, such as TopPop and Musikladen. After leaving the rock scene, she later played and sang in the Wakefield Theater Club.

In the fall of 1977, she replaced Penny McLean and became a member of the Silver Convention disco group. Along with Jerry Rix, she recorded a duet "Spend The Night With Me", which became a modest hit in the United States. While on tour with the group in Mexico, she met a businessman who later became her first husband. Shortly after, she left the Silver Convention and went on a hiatus.

In 1999, Jacks made a comeback by being one of the singers for Hard Rain. She recorded 2 albums and went on tour with the group. Today, she lives a private life in Birmingham, England, and makes occasional appearances.
