= Hard Rain (Hard Rain album) =

Studio album by Hard Rain
- Released: March 10, 1997
- Recorded: February 1996 – December 1996
- Studio: Mad Hat Studios, Wolverhampton
- Genre: Hard rock
- Length: 59:03
- Label: Semaphore
- Producer: Tony Clarkin

Hard Rain chronology
Hard Rain (1997)	When the Good Times Come (1999)

Singles from Hard Rain
- 1. "Stop Me from Lovin' You" Released: 1997

Hard Rain is the debut studio album by British melodic rock band Hard Rain. It was released in 1997 on German record label Semaphore GmbH.

Following the demise of Magnum in 1995, guitarist and songwriter Tony Clarkin and vocalist Bob Catley set off in search of a slight change in musical direction. New songs were recorded, a deal was struck and the end result was this album. Largely overlooked first time around, Sanctuary Records released a remastered and expanded edition in 2006. As most of the songs on the album were written before the split of Magnum and were actually meant for a Magnum album, Bob Catley has stated that the album was a cross between Hard Rain and Magnum.

Tony Clarkin commented: "We decided to try some things out with the backing vocals and I knew of a Midlands band called Asia Blue who'd just finished a record deal so we got Jackie and Wendy in to try some backing vocals out."

All of the drum parts on the album are drum samples or played by Tony Clarkin.

== Track listing ==
All tracks written by Tony Clarkin and Bob Catley.

1. "Rage On" – 3:58
2. "Shame for the Bad Boy" – 4:52
3. "You'd Start a Fight" – 4:24
4. "Stop Me from Lovin' You" – 5:10
5. "Lookin' for a Way" – 5:19
6. "Cry Cry Cry" – 4:04
7. "I Must Have Been Blind" – 4:43
8. "Perpetual Commotion" – 4:28
9. "Different Kind of Love" – 8:18
10. "Another Nice Mess" – 4:58

Bonus track

11. "That Ain't Love" – 5:01

2006 expanded edition included these tracks

12. "Stop Me from Lovin' You" [edit] – 3:35

== Singles ==
"Stop Me from Lovin' You" (1997)

1. "Stop Me from Lovin' You (Edit)" – 3:35
2. "Rage On" – 3:58
3. "Stop Me from Lovin' You" – 5:10

== Personnel ==
- Tony Clarkin – guitar, drums
- Bob Catley – vocals

Additional musicians

- Sue McCloskey – vocals
- Jackie Dean – vocals
- Wendy Peddie – vocals

Production

- Recorded at Mad Hat Studios, Wolverhampton, United Kingdom
- Produced Tony Clarkin
- Engineered and Mixed by Mike Cowling
