= Hard Rain (band) =

British rock band

- Origin: Birmingham, England
- Genres: Hard rock, melodic rock, AOR
- Years active: 1996–2000
- Labels: Sophomore GmbH (1997); Eagle (1998–2000)
- Spinoff of: Magnum
- Past members: Tony Clarkin; Bob Catley; Al Barrow; Rob Barrow; Adam Cormack; Paul Hodson; Sue McCloskey
- Website: magnumonline.co.uk

Hard Rain were a British melodic hard rock band from Birmingham. Formed in 1996, following the demise of Magnum. The core of the band are vocalist Bob Catley and guitarist/songwriter Tony Clarkin.

After Magnum split, a spin-off group featuring Catley and Clarkin was formed called Hard Rain, with a contemporary and alternative style. They released the albums Hard Rain in 1997 and When the Good Times Come in 1999. At this time, Catley was becoming increasingly focused on his solo career, and he quit Hard Rain in 1999, marking the end of a working relationship with Clarkin that dated back to 1972. After a quiet period Clarkin announced the end of Hard Rain.

== History ==
=== Hard Rain (1996–1998) ===
After Magnum split up, Tony invited Bob Catley to help him finish off a few demos. The demo secured a record deal with German label Sophomore GmbH, so they made the decision to form a new band, rather than re-form Magnum. The entire self-titled album, Hard Rain (released in May 1997) was recorded at Mad Hat studios in Walsall, between February and December 1996 by Tony Clarkin and Bob Catley with programmed drums, apart from the backing vocals.

A band was assembled including Sue McCloskey on backing vocals, who had participated in the recording of the album. Sue McCloskey had sung with Silver Convention under the name Zenda Jacks. Other recruits to the band included keyboardist Paul Hodson and bassist Al Barrow, as well as Barrow's brother Rob on drums, who was selected after rehearsal sessions with original Magnum drummer Kex Gorin had failed to work out.

The band released a single in the much-favoured country of Germany "Stop Me From Loving You". After a successful UK tour, the band began work on a second album and signed with a new record company, Eagle Records. The previous record company, Semaphore GmbH, had gone bust. Their début album was subsequently reissued in Receiver Records as Perpetual Commotion.

=== When the Good Times Come (1999–2000) ===
The band returned to Mad Hat studios to begin work on a follow-up album. When the Good Times Come (released in April 1999) featured the touring band, rather than Tony using a drum machine and programming. The album was very diverse and explored styles such as Funk, Jazz and Blues (feat. Gary Barnacle on sax). A promotional tour in the UK started in April.

In September 1999, after very long and careful considerations, longtime front man of Magnum and Hard Rain and longtime musical partner for Tony Clarkin, Bob Catley decided to leave the band due to musical differences, and pursue his solo career.

Bob sums up his decision to leave: "I told Tony my feelings and he said 'That's fine with me, and I don't want you to sing these songs and I don't want you in the band any more, if you aren't giving it your 100% effort'. So I said 'Okay, I think I had better leave then'. That was it really. But we were both very grown up about it. It happened really quickly over 3 days amid lots of frantic phone calls. It was a really hard decision but I feel so relieved now that I can concentrate on Gary Hughes songs because I feel they ARE me. I still do lots of Magnum songs on stage because the crowd loves them." — Bob Catley, September 1999

Tony Clarkin continued to write and record new ideas with the presumption that Sue McCloskey would take over Bob's position.

"Sue and I are co-writing these new songs; it's the first time in my career that I've has a regular song writing partner, and were coming up with some very commercial stuff. But where we go from here is anybody's guess." — Tony Clarkin, September 1999

On 29 January 2000, Tony Clarkin performed a charity show with Sue McCloskey at the Stumble Inn in Cannock. All proceeds and profits went to Mencap. This was the first professional appearance since Bob Catley departed from Hard Rain. News surfaced in December 2000 that Tony Clarkin & Bob Catley would reform Magnum for an album and tour, set for September 2001.

Clarkin comments: "The break since the middle of the Nineties was definitely necessary for me. Since the end of the Seventies, in fact since we embarked on the preparations for our debut recording Kingdom of Madness, not a single month had gone by in which I didn't work for Magnum, composed for the group, or at least thought of them permanently. For almost twenty years, all my thoughts had revolved around the band. I needed a break to clear my head and to be able to devote myself to the band again with renewed energy." — Tony Clarkin, 2002

During his sabbatical, Clarkin worked as a producer and wrote songs for other artists.

== Members ==
- Tony Clarkin – guitar (1996–2000), drums (1996–1997)
- Bob Catley – lead vocals (1996–1999)
- Al Barrow – bass (1997–2000)
- Rob Barrow – drums (1997–2000)
- Paul Hodson – keyboards (1997–2000)
- Sue McCloskey – backing vocals (1997–1999), lead vocals (1999–2000)

== Discography ==
- Hard Rain (1997) Reissued as Perpetual Commotion (1999)
- When the Good Times Come (1999)
