= Al Barrow =

British bassist

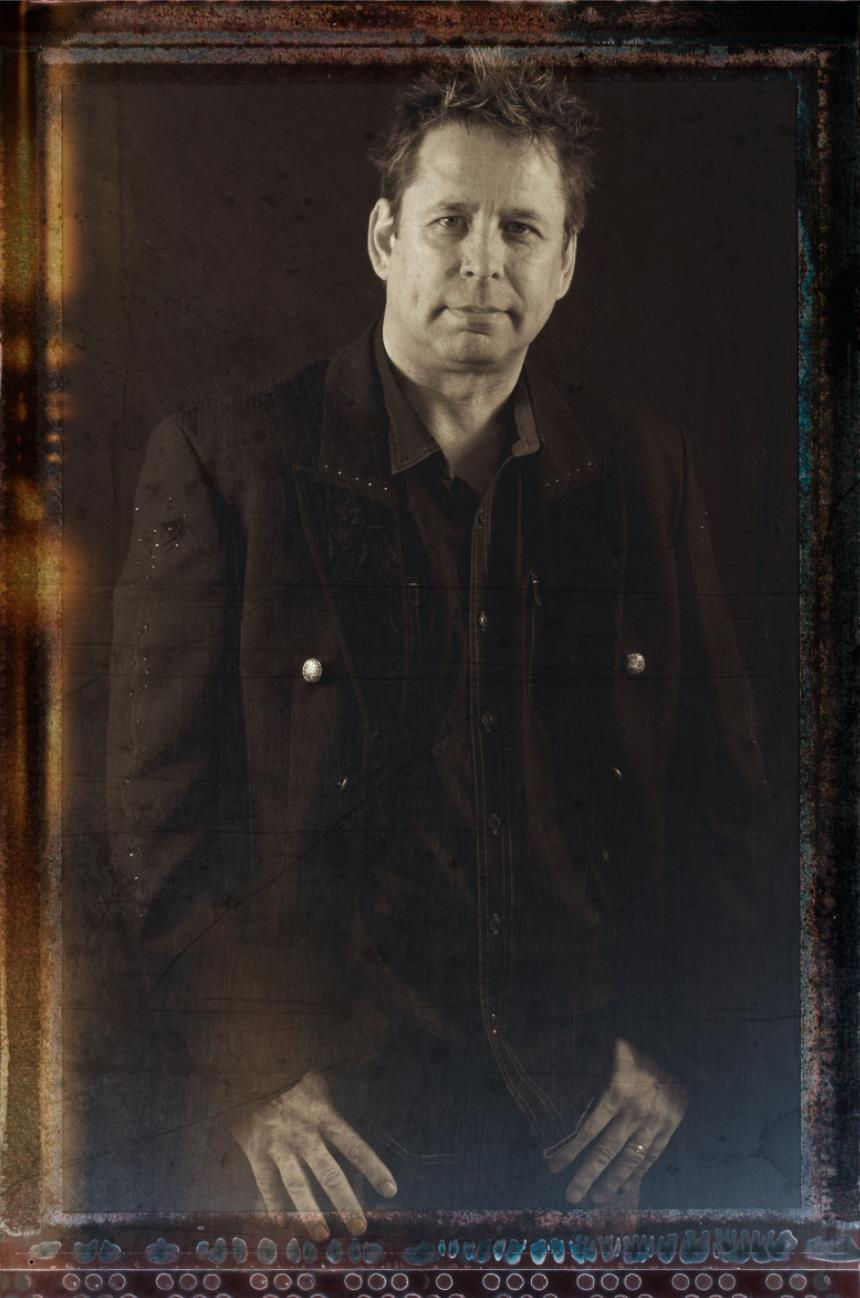
- Barrow in 2017

Background information
- Born: 1968 (age 57–58); Wolverhampton, England
- Genres: Hard rock, melodic rock
- Occupation: Bassist
- Years active: 1997–present
- Formerly of: Magnum, Hard Rain

Al Barrow (born 1968) is an English bassist best known as the former member of the hard rock band Magnum.

== Biography ==
Barrow joined Magnum in 2001 after he was a member of Hard Rain, a group formed by Magnum members, Bob Catley and Tony Clarkin, while activities around Magnum was set on pause. Officially the band ended, but made a comeback in 2001 with their album Breath of Life.

Barrow not only plays bass guitar, but also has an interest in design and photography. With his company Generic Designs, he has designed album covers for Magnum and several other artists worldwide. Magnum albums, Breath of Life, Brand New Morning, The Visitation, Evolution Escape from the Shadow Garden, and Live at the Symphony Hall all had covers designed by Barrow.

Before joining Magnum, Barrow performed as a session musician, both playing bass and as a backing vocalist. He had his own band, Sahara Darc, and planned to re-record some of the songs he wrote in the 1990s. Barrow is an endorsee for Fender, Line 6, Warwick basses and amplifiers.

Alan and his wife emigrated to USA in 2016. They now live in Chattanooga, Tennessee.

On 25 June 2019, Alan announced his departure from Magnum.

== Discography ==
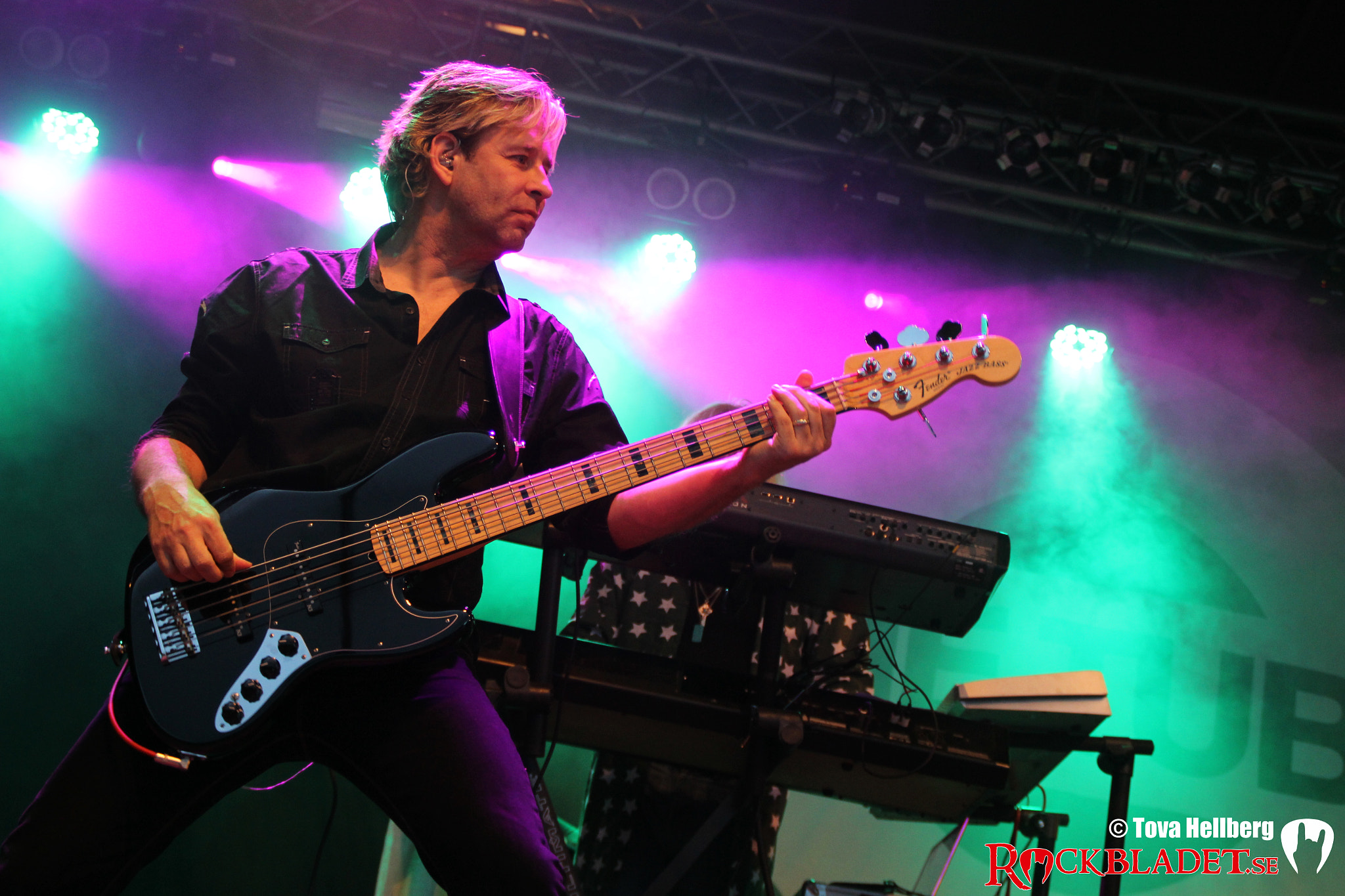
Barrow with Magnum in 2015

- Studio albums as part of Hard Rain

- When the Good Times Come (1999)

- Studio albums as part of Magnum

- Breath of Life (2002)
- Brand New Morning (2004)
- Princess Alice and the Broken Arrow (2007)
- Into the Valley of the Moonking (2009)
- The Visitation (2011)
- On the 13th Day (2012)
- Escape from the Shadow Garden (2014)
- Sacred Blood "Divine" Lies (2016)
- Lost on the Road to Eternity (2017)

- Other

- Spirit of Man, Bob Catley (2006)
- When Empires Burn, Bob Catley (2003)
