= Bob Catley =

British rock singer

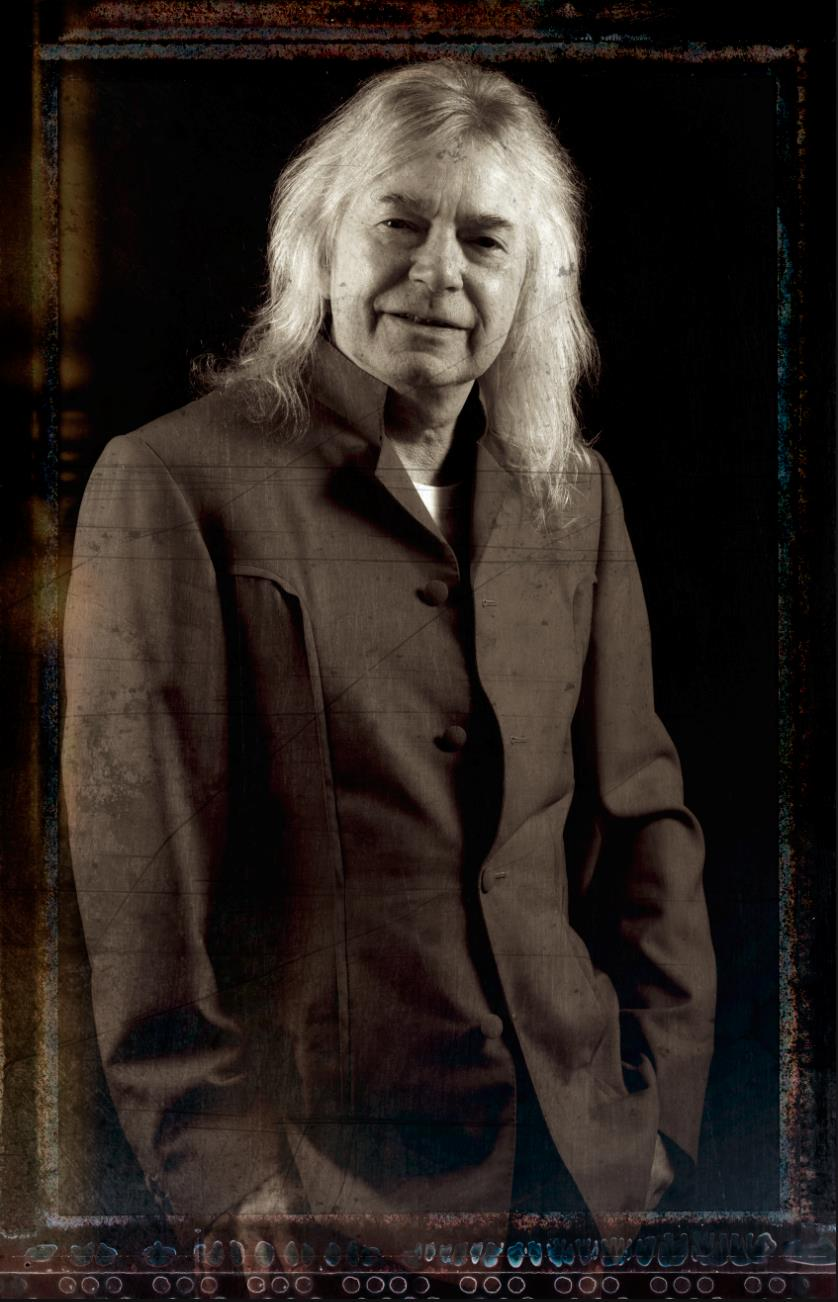

Background information
- Born: 11 September 1947 (age 78); Aldershot, Hampshire, England
- Genres: Hard rock, AOR
- Occupation: Singer
- Years active: 1972–present
- Member of: Magnum
- Formerly of: Hard Rain

Robert Adrian Catley (born 11 September 1947) is an English singer. He is the lead singer of the hard rock band Magnum and is also active as a solo artist.

== Biography ==
=== Early years (1947–1972) ===
Born in Aldershot on 11 September 1947, Catley's family moved to the Tile Cross area of Birmingham when he was young.

He went on to attend the nearby Central Grammar School for Boys (Birmingham) and left to start an apprenticeship at the GPO before deciding on a musical career shortly after meeting similarly minded individuals at college.

Whilst at college he joined several bands, such as The Smokestacks (Jeff Clark-guitar, Ron Savage-guitar, Derek Danks- bass & Brian Worrell- drums Life and Clearwater). His first professional band was when he joined local outfit The Capitol Systems. The initial line-up was Bob Catley (vocals) Paul Sargent (guitar) Paul Whitehouse (bass), Dave Bailey (keyboards) and Bob Moore (drums). Shortly afterward they changed their name to Paradox, inspired by a science-fiction novel. A one-off deal was arranged with Mercury after Paradox had come to the attention of Francis Rossi and Rick Parfitt. The tracks were "Ever Since I Can Remember", backed with "Goodbye Mary". In addition they recorded "Mary Colinto" and "Somebody Save Me". All of these songs were written by Dave Morgan.

Paradox played festivals in the Netherlands and Italy before splitting up upon their return to the UK in 1970.

=== Magnum (1972–1995) ===
Formed in 1972, Magnum have undergone several changes in personnel over the years, however the core of vocalist Bob Catley and guitarist/songwriter Tony Clarkin remained throughout.

Magnum began as the house band at Birmingham's famous Rum Runner night club (later the home of Duran Duran). They began to develop their own style by playing Clarkin's songs at a residency at The Railway Inn, in Birmingham's Curzon Street, in 1976. Joining Clarkin and Catley were drummer Kex Gorin and bassist Dave Morgan (later a member of ELO). Their most notable success during these early years was the Jeff Glixman produced Chase The Dragon (1982) which reached No. 17 in the UK, and included several songs that would be mainstays of the band's live set, notably "Soldier of the Line", "Sacred Hour" and "The Spirit".

Their breakthrough album came in 1985 with On a Storyteller's Night which featured the single "Just Like an Arrow". This success continued in the following years with the Roger Taylor produced Vigilante in 1986, the top 5 album Wings of Heaven in 1988, and the Keith Olsen produced Goodnight L.A. reaching No. 9 in the UK album charts in 1990.

In the summer of 1995 Tony Clarkin announced the band were to split following a farewell tour of the UK and Europe.

=== Hard Rain (1995–2001) ===
After Magnum split, a spin-off group featuring Catley and Clarkin was formed called Hard Rain, and they released the albums Hard Rain and When The Good Times Come. It was around this time that Catley launched a solo career using various songwriters, including Gary Hughes of the band Ten. However, Hard Rain found gigs and booking hard to come by, and there were discussions about renaming the band as Magnum. Also, at this time, Catley was becoming increasingly focused on his solo career, and he quit Hard Rain, marking the end of a working relationship with Clarkin that dated back to 1972. After a quiet period Clarkin announced the end of Hard Rain.

=== Magnum reunion (2001–2024) ===
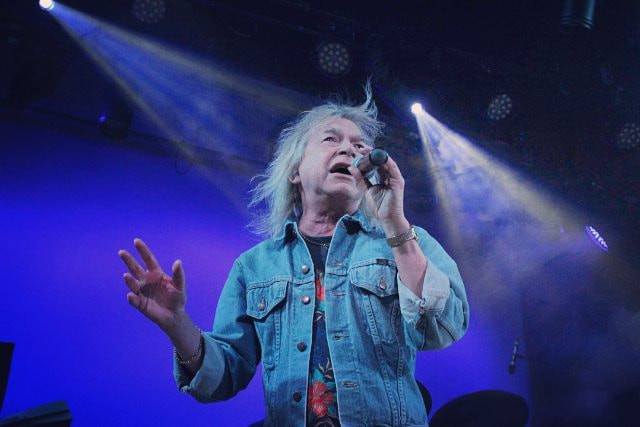
Catley performing with Magnum in 2016

Tony Clarkin and Catley re-launched Magnum with the album Breath of Life in 2002 on SPV. They were again joined by Stanway, with former Hard Rain bassist Al Barrow and former-Thunder drummer Harry James. This was subsequently followed by Brand New Morning in 2004.

Magnum completed work on a new studio album, Princess Alice and the Broken Arrow released on 26 March 2007, that also marked the return of cover artwork by Rodney Matthews. The album entered the UK Album Charts at #70, the first time Magnum have charted in the UK since 1994. It also reached No. 4 on the BBC Rock Album Charts and No. 60 in Germany, the band's biggest market outside of the UK along with Scandinavia.

The band disbanded in early 2024 following the death of Tony Clarkin in the January of that year.

=== Solo career (1998–present) ===
Despite a busy touring and recording schedule with Hard Rain, Bob Catley found time to embark on a solo career. He was first approached by Gary Hughes (frontman of Rock band Ten) in 1998 to write a solo album. He teamed up with Hughes who wrote all the songs on The Tower (as well as producing and playing bass and keyboards). The Tower was written with Magnum in mind. The Tower was released in 1998.

Catley made his debut solo appearance at The Gods '98, performing a show stopping set featuring tracks from The Tower as well as classic Magnum songs. Such was the response to the show that Now & Then decided to release an "official bootleg" of the set. Live at the Gods which was released in January 1999 and features the full set list performed on the day. Bob's backing band for the concert was made up of Canadian label mates Emerald Rain with Vinny Burns (Ten) on lead guitar and Paul Hodson (Hard Rain) on keyboards. Catley Emerald Rain also undertook a UK tour.

During the summer of 1999 recording commenced on Catley's second solo album Legends. Gary Hughes once again wrote and produced the album (as well as playing keyboards) with Ten's Vinny Burns and Steve McKenna and Dante Fox's John Cooksey providing the musical backing. The songs are based on various legends.

Legends was launched at The Gods 99 where Catley headlined the Saturday night with Emerald Rain and Paul Hodson once again providing backing. Catley toured the UK extensively during 2000 with Paul Hodson and Native Cain providing his backing band. In the run up to Christmas 2000 he toured the UK again, and for one Spanish date, with special guest Kip Winger.

2001 saw the release of Catley's third album Middle Earth, which was based on J. R. R. Tolkien's epic The Lord of the Rings. The songs, once again penned by Gary Hughes, are based on various parts/incidents/characters from the book. Musicians on Middle Earth include Hughes' band mates Ten plus a guest appearance by Landmarq vocalist Tracy Hitchings. Catley toured extensively in 2001 with Kip Winger opening acoustically early in the year, and then spent a month co-headlining UK and European dates.

2003 saw a change in writing partners for Catley: When Empires Burn was written and produced by Catley's long time keyboard player Paul Hodson and features a much heavier sound, bordering on heavy metal. The backing band included Vince O’Regan (Guitars), Al Barrow (Bass) and Jamie Little (Drums). When Empires Burn was again backed by a full European tour.

Catley's 2006 solo album Spirit of Man was written by Dave Thompson and Paul Uttley of Lost Weekend and Vince O’Regan of Pulse, and was recorded at KRT Studio's in Wolverhampton. Catley and O'Regan co-produced the album. The album was supported by a full UK and European tour, including an intimate date at London's famous Underworld club. This band featured Oliver Wakeman (ex-Yes) on keyboards.

Catley was also one of the many singers involved with the Power Metal project Avantasia, created by Edguy's frontman Tobias Sammet. Catley was featured in almost all Avantasia albums, from The Metal Operas through the Wicked Trilogy and The Mystery of Time to the most recent album, A Paranormal Evening with the Moonflower Society. He also took part in all Avantasia world tours in 2008, 2010, 2013 and 2016. He is seen on the DVD from the first tour.

== Personal life ==
Catley has been married and divorced three times and has two daughters.

== Discography ==
=== Hard Rain ===
- Hard Rain (1997)
- When the Good Times Come (1999)

=== Solo ===
- The Tower (1998)
- Live at the Gods (1999)
- Legends (1999)
- Middle Earth (2001)
- When Empires Burn (2003)
- Spirit of Man (2006)
- Immortal (2008)

=== Side projects ===
- Jabberwocky (1999) – Clive Nolan and Oliver Wakeman
- Hound of the Baskervilles (2002) – Clive Nolan and Oliver Wakeman
- The Metal Opera Part II (2002) – Avantasia project by Tobias Sammet of Edguy
- Once and Future King Part I (2003) – Gary Hughes of Ten
- Once and Future King Part II (2003) – Gary Hughes of Ten
- The Scarecrow (2008) – Avantasia
- 01011001 (2008) – Ayreon project by Arjen Anthony Lucassen
- The Wicked Symphony (2010) – Avantasia
- Angel of Babylon (2010) – Avantasia
- The Flying Opera (live album) (2011) – Avantasia
- The Mystery of Time (2013) – Avantasia
- Ghostlights (2016) – Avantasia
- Moonglow (2019) – Avantasia
- A Paranormal Evening with the Moonflower Society (2022) – Avantasia
- Here Be Dragons (2025) - Avantasia
